= List of trees of Georgia (U.S. state) =

This page lists tree and large shrub species native to Georgia, as well as cultivated, invasive, naturalized, and introduced species.

== Native trees ==
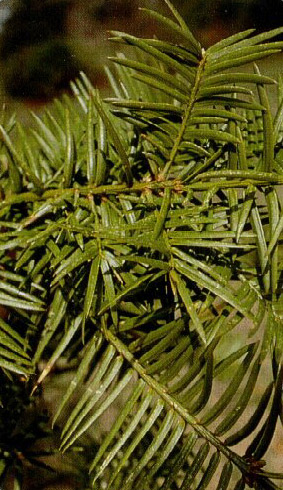
Torreya taxifolia, Critically Endangered

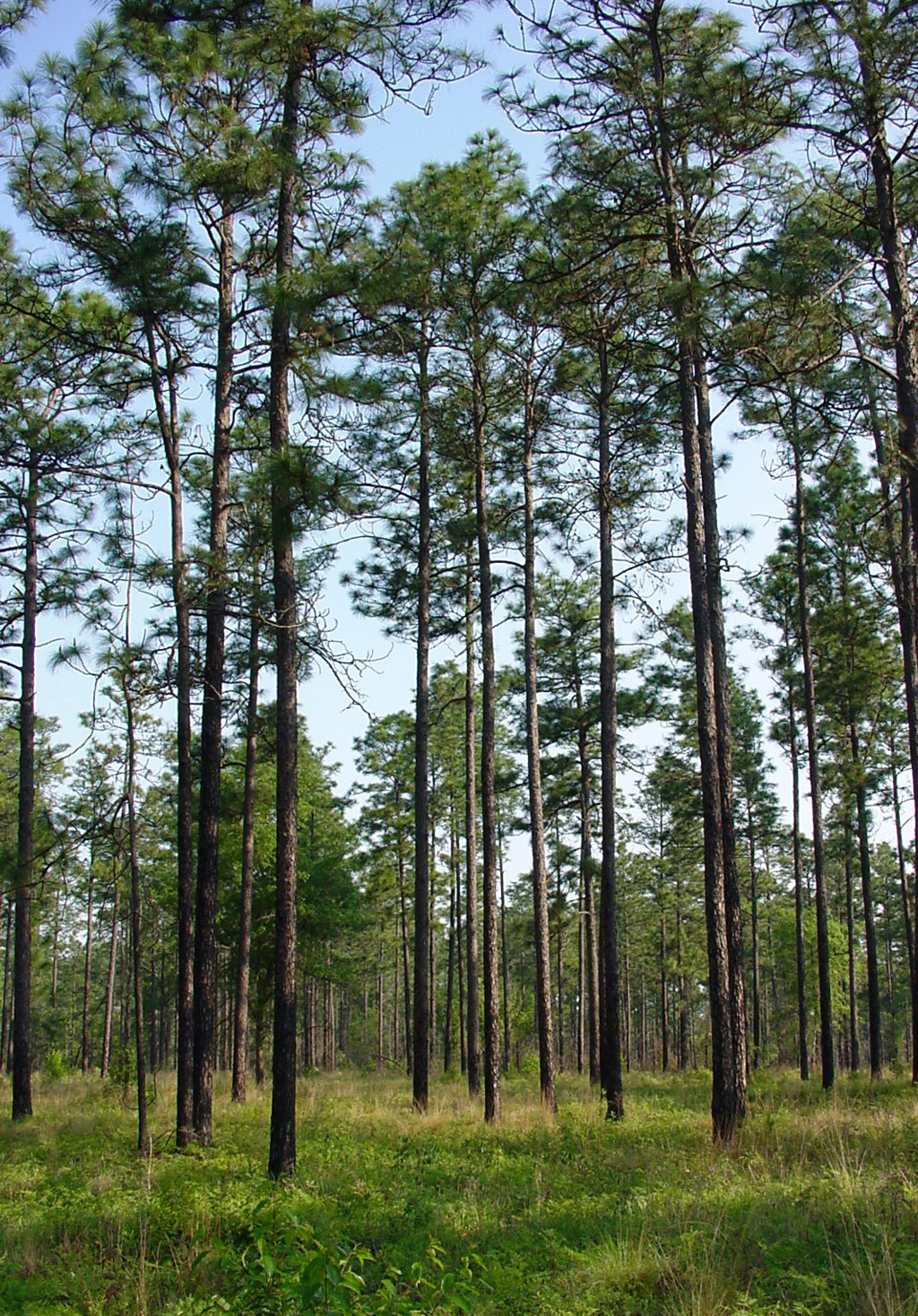
Pinus palustris, Endangered

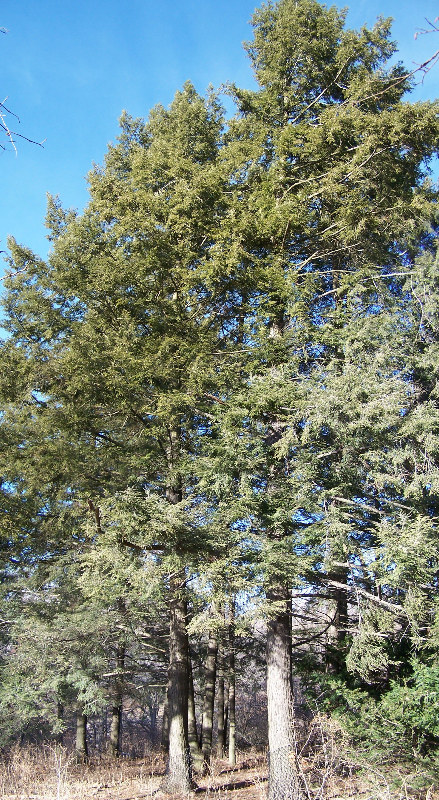
Tsuga canadensis, Near Threatened

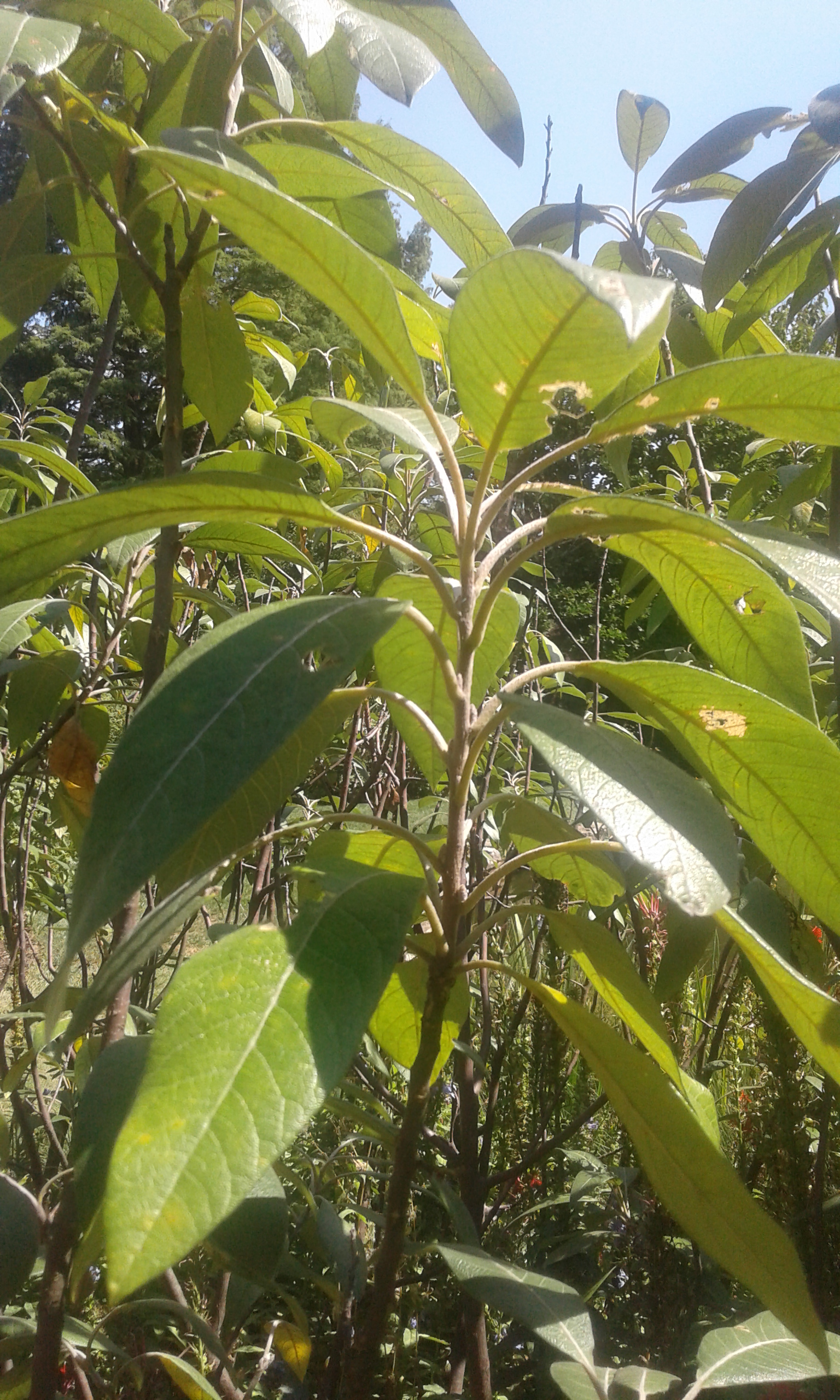
Leitneria floridana, Near Threatened

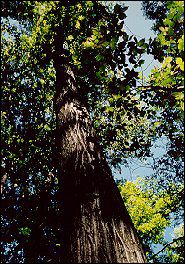
Juglans cinerea, Endangered

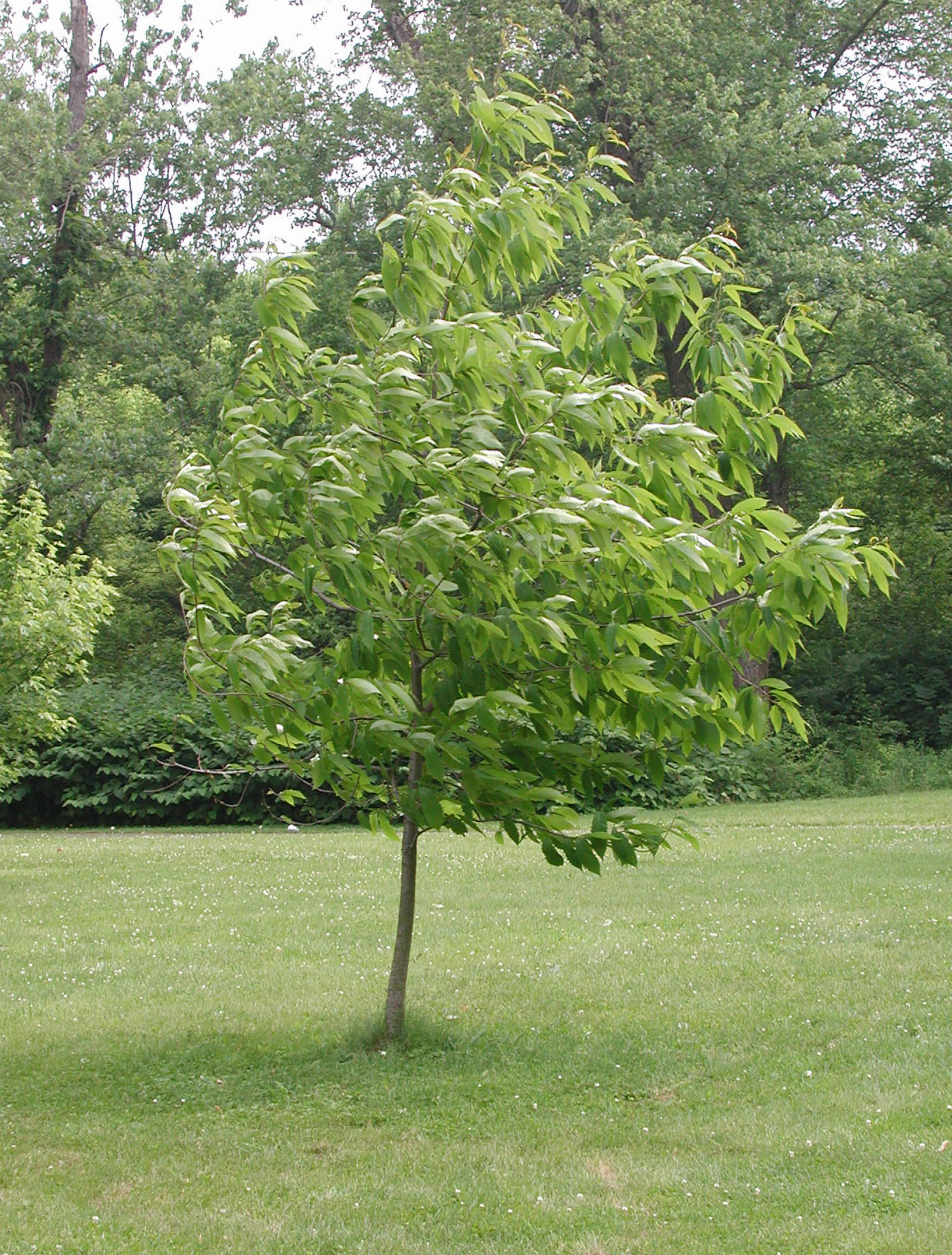
Castanea dentata, Critically Endangered

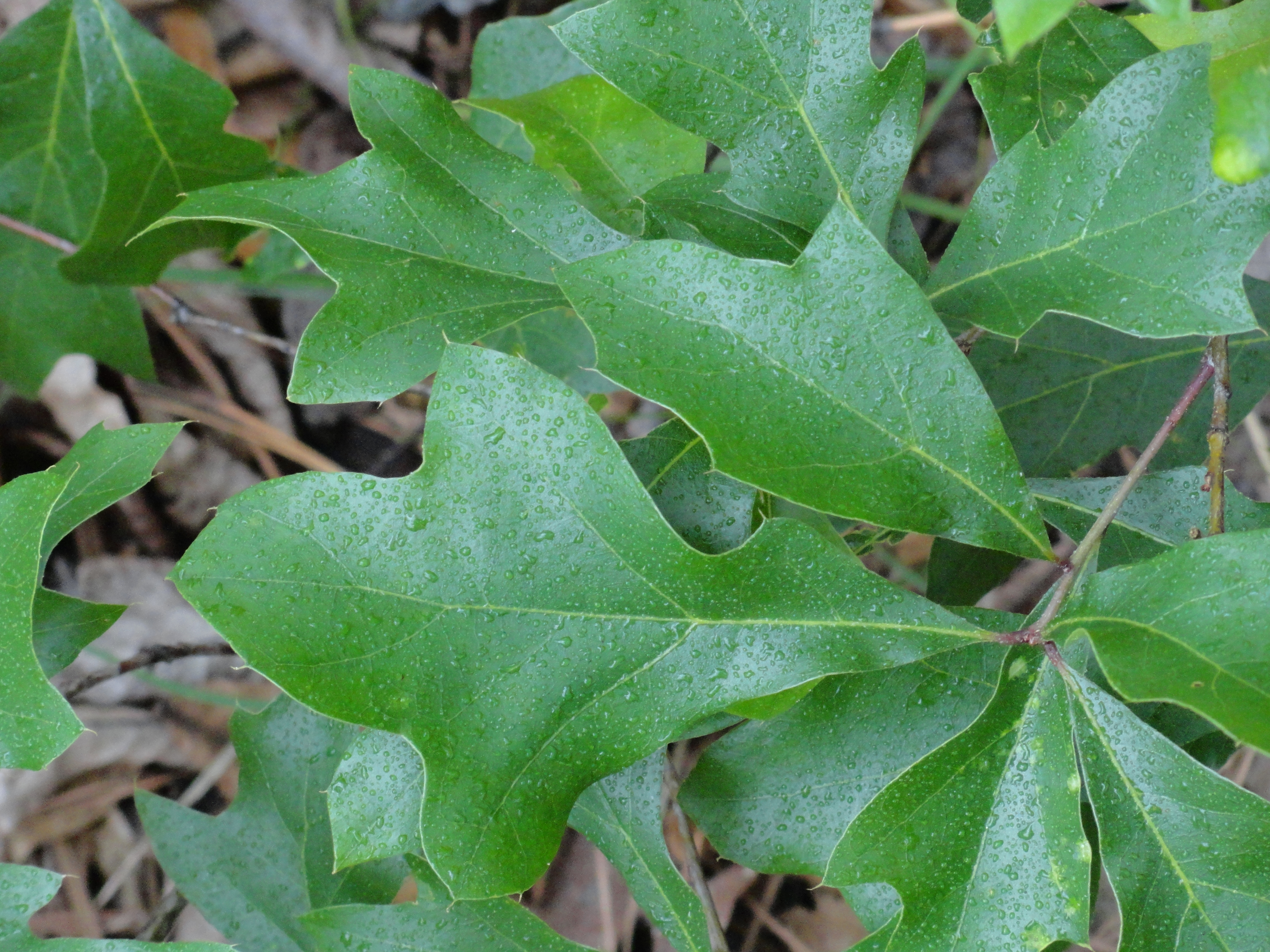
Quercus georgiana, Endangered

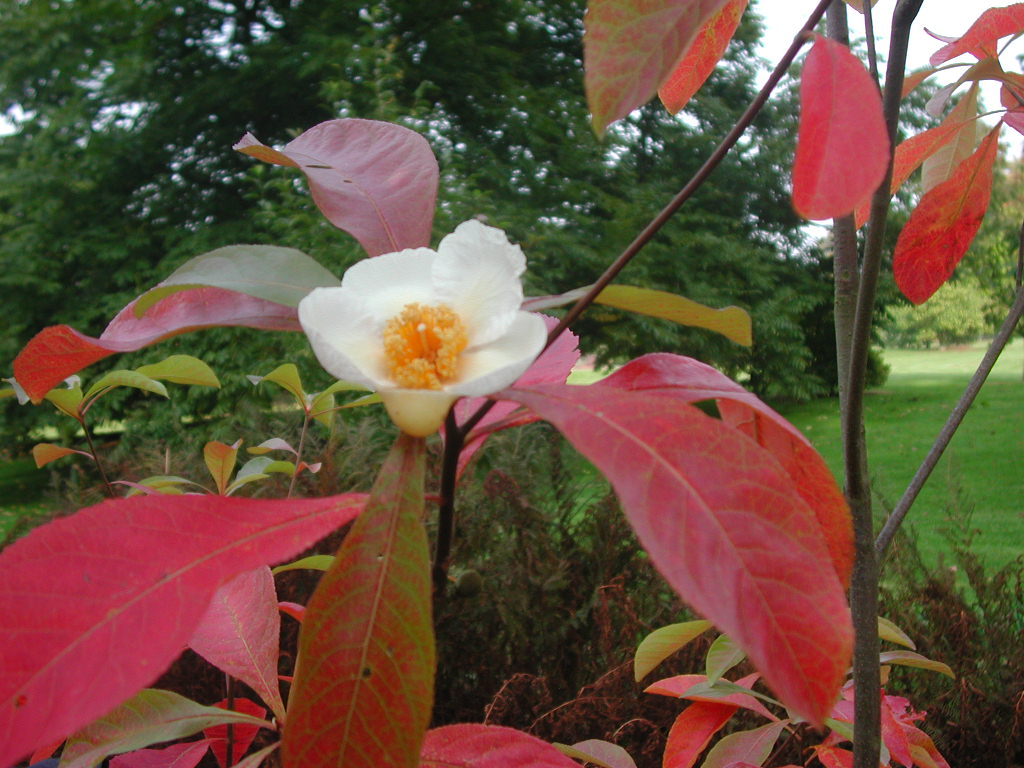
Franklinia alatamaha, Extinct in the wild

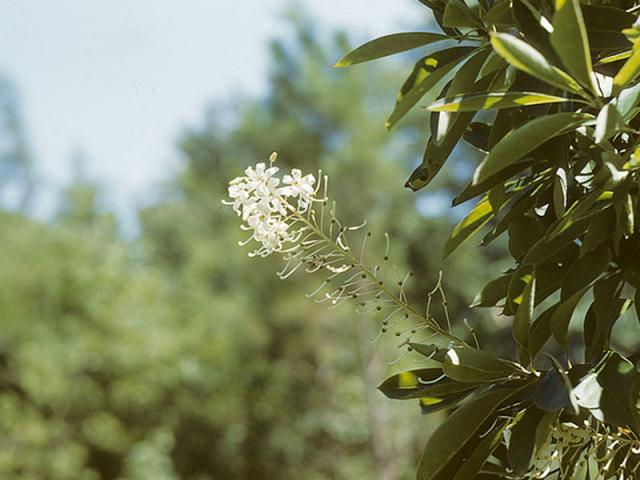
Elliottia racemosa, G2 - Imperiled

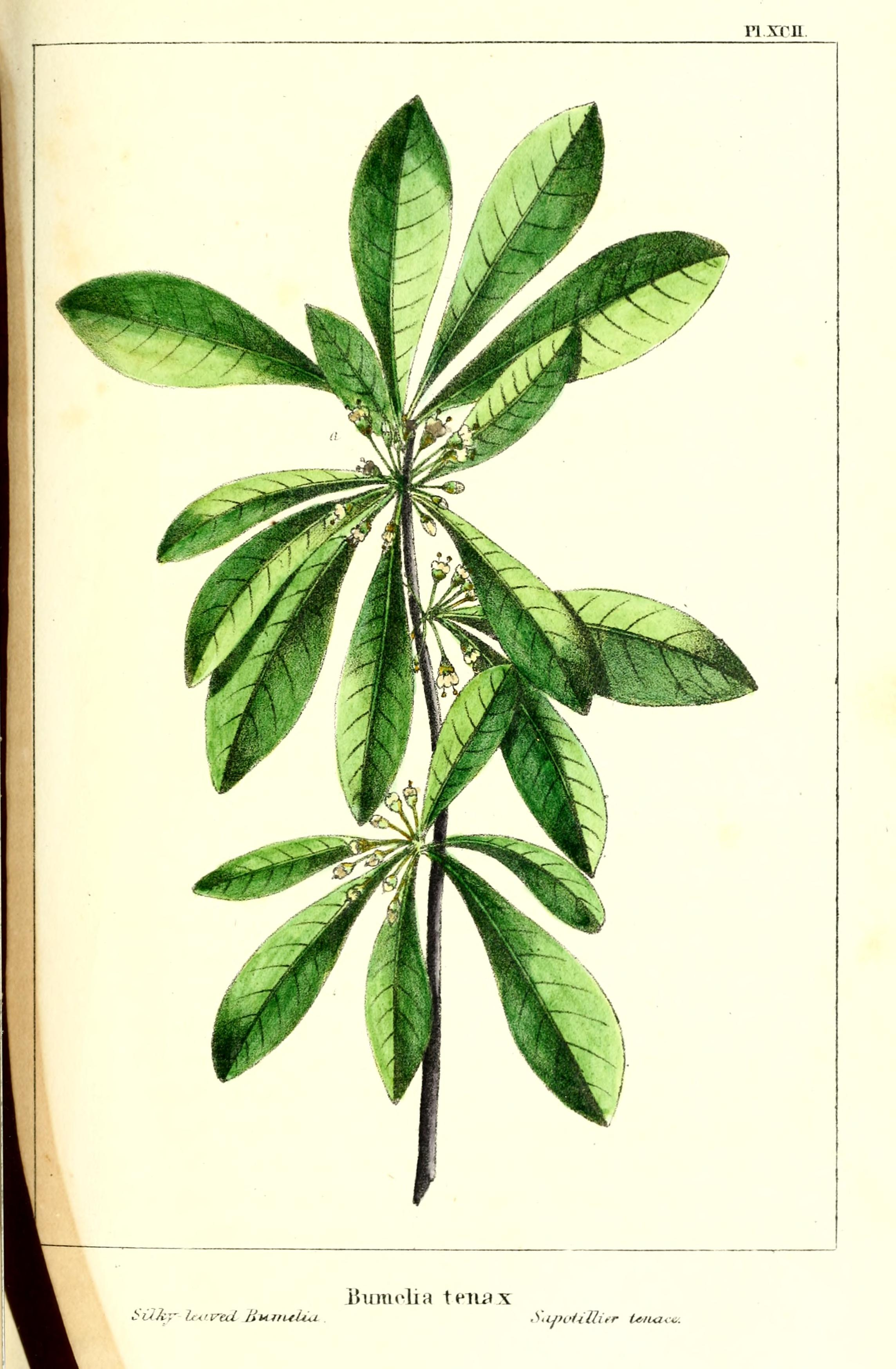
Sideroxylon tenax, G3 - Vulnerable

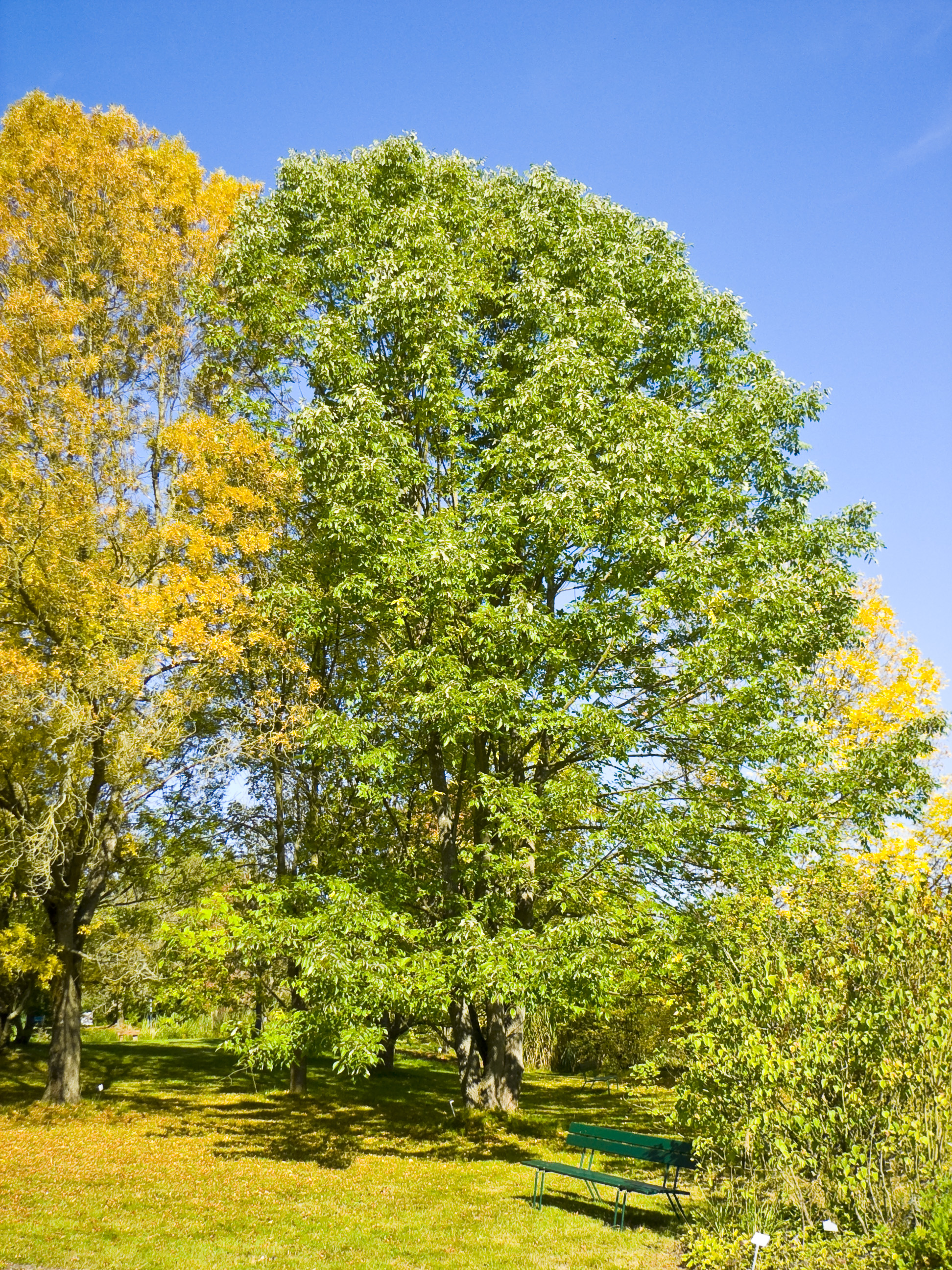
Fraxinus americana, Critically Endangered

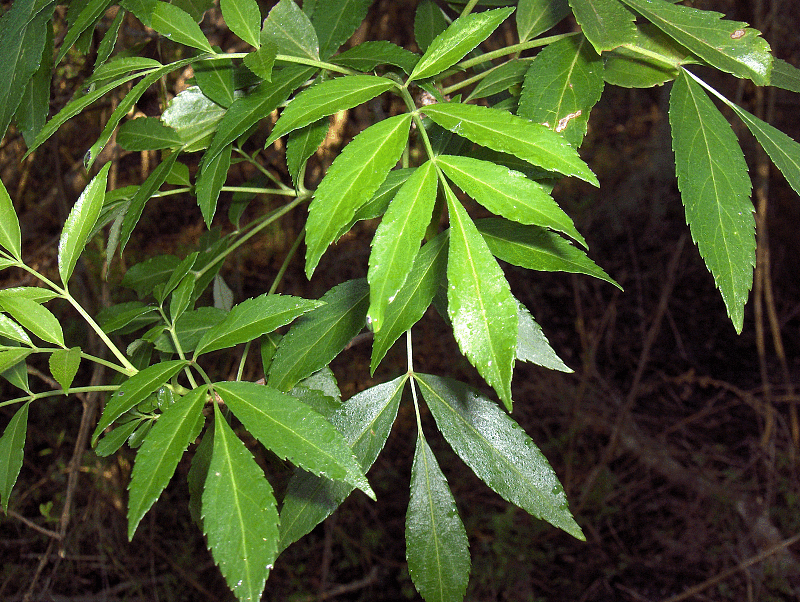
Fraxinus caroliniana, Endangered

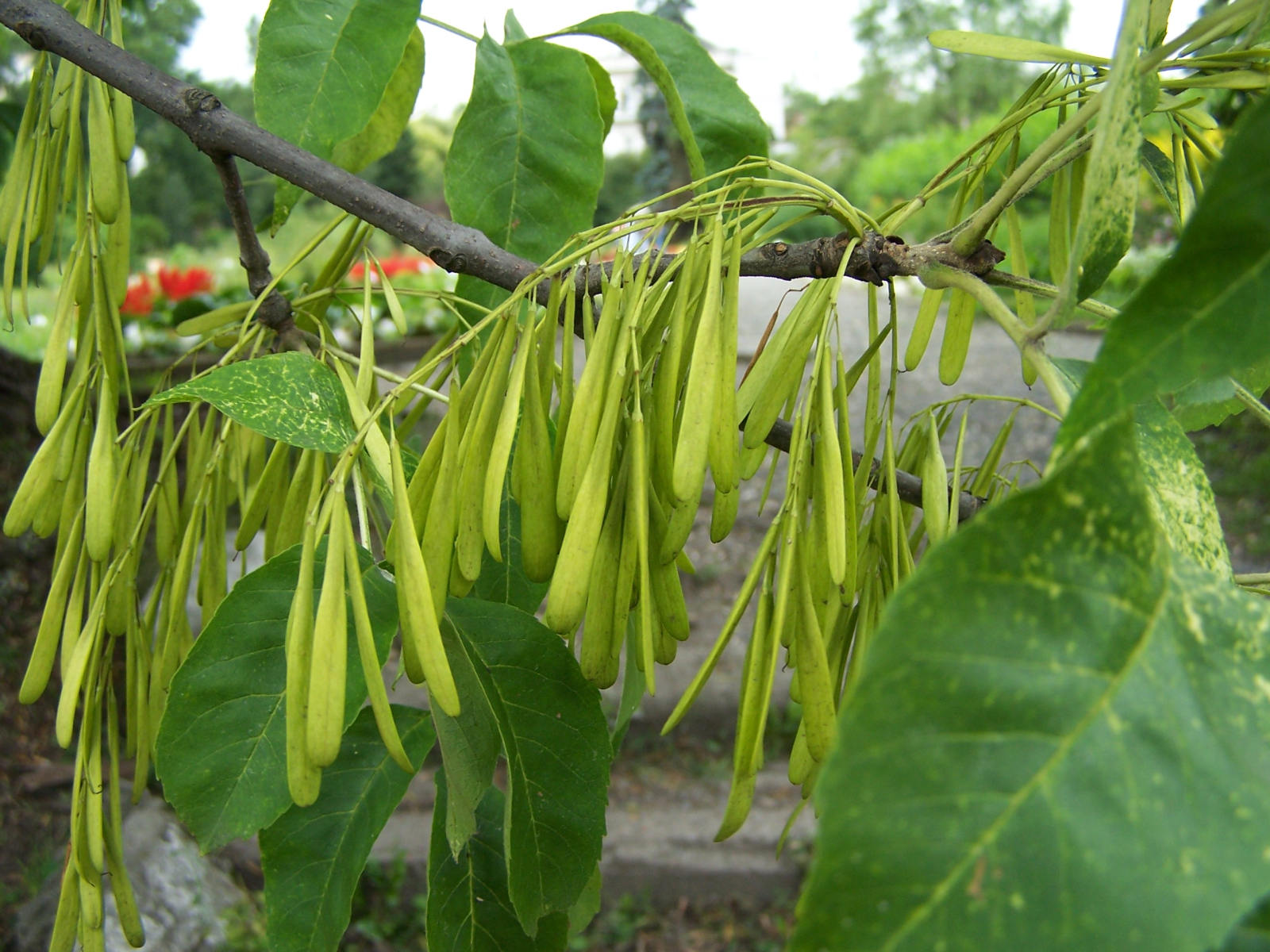
Fraxinus pennsylvanica, Critically Endangered

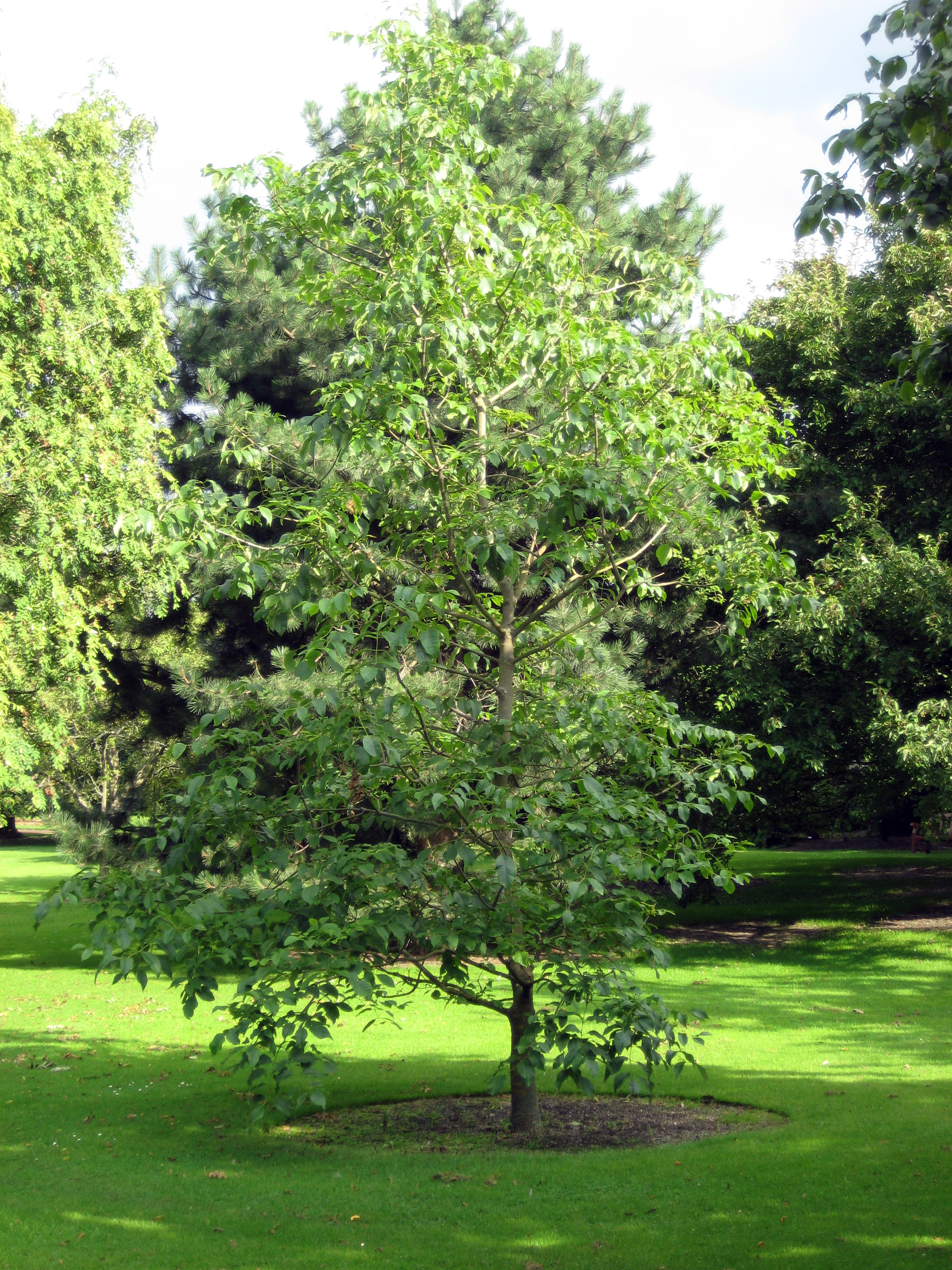
Fraxinus profunda, Critically Endangered

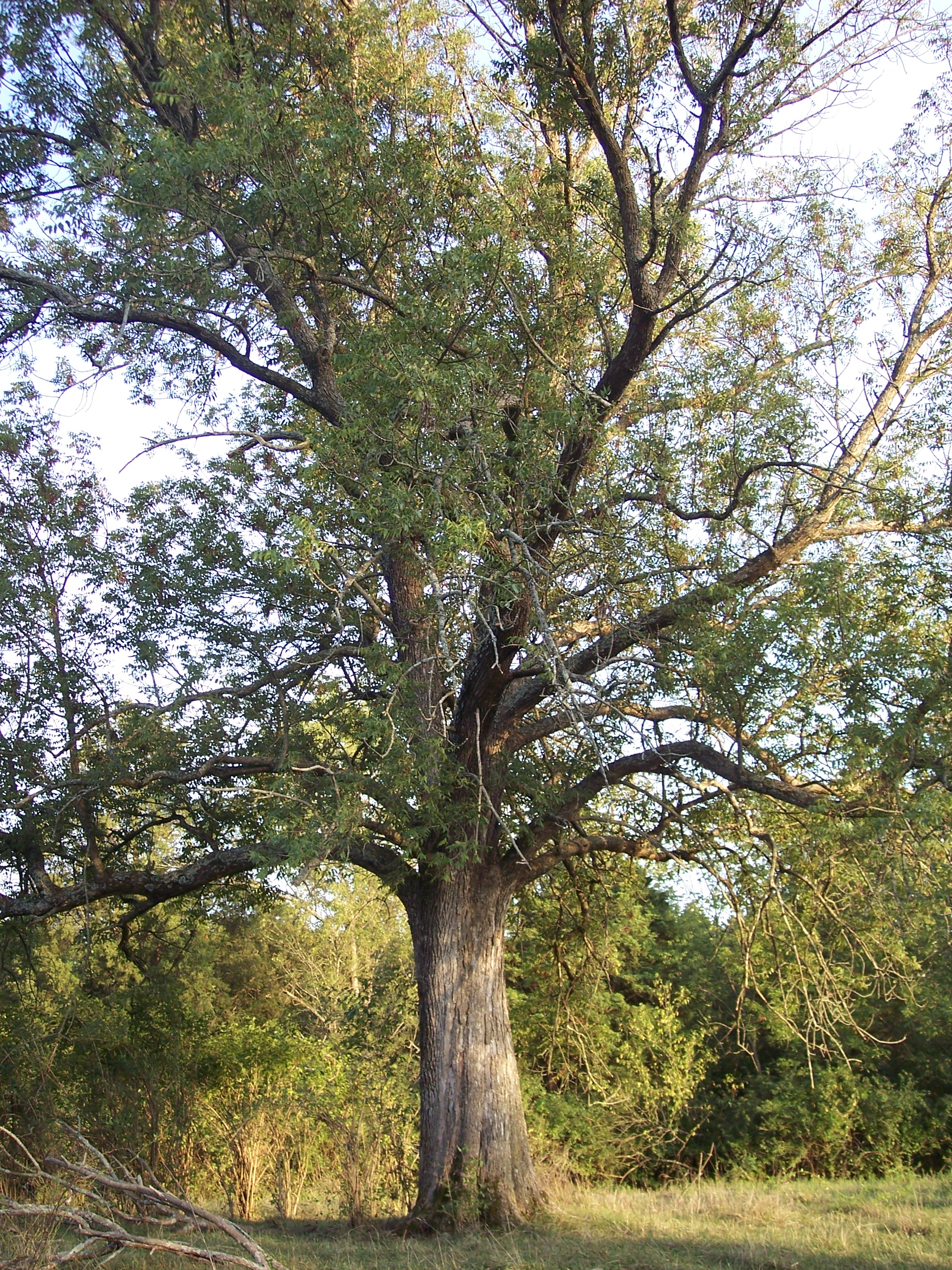
Fraxinus quadrangulata, Critically Endangered

Family	Scientific name	Common names	Range within Georgia	Conservation status
Taxaceae	Torreya taxifolia Arn.	Florida Torreya, Stinking Cedar	Decatur County, Georgia	Critically Endangered
Pinaceae	Pinus echinata Mill.	Shortleaf Pine	Piedmont and Coastal Plain	Least Concern
Pinaceae	Pinus elliottii Engelm.	Slash Pine	Coastal Plain	Least Concern
Pinaceae	Pinus glabra Walter	Spruce Pine	Coastal Plain	Least Concern
Pinaceae	Pinus palustris Mill.	Longleaf Pine	Coastal Plain, Ridge and Valley Province	Endangered
Pinaceae	Pinus pungens Lamb.	Table Mountain Pine	Upper Piedmont, Blue Ridge Mountains	Least Concern
Pinaceae	Pinus rigida Mill.	Pitch Pine	Blue Ridge Mountains	Least Concern
Pinaceae	Pinus serotina Michx.	Pond Pine	Coastal Plain	Least Concern
Pinaceae	Pinus strobus L.	Eastern White Pine	Upper Piedmont	Least Concern
Pinaceae	Pinus taeda L.	Loblolly Pine	State-wide	Least Concern
Pinaceae	Pinus virginiana Mill.	Virginia Pine	Upper Piedmont, Ridge and Valley Province, Blue Ridge Mountains	Least Concern
Pinaceae	Tsuga canadensis (L.) Carr.	Eastern Hemlock	Ridge and Valley Province, Blue Ridge Mountains	Near Threatened
Pinaceae	Tsuga caroliniana Engelm.	Carolina Hemlock	Rabun County, Georgia, Habersham County, Georgia	Near Threatened
Taxodiaceae	Taxodium ascendens Brongn.	Pond Cypress	Coastal Plain	G5 - Secure
Taxodiaceae	Taxodium distichum (L.) Rich.	Bald Cypress	Coastal Plain	Least Concern
Cupressaceae	Chamaecyparis thyoides (L.) B.S.A.	Atlantic White Cedar	Southwest Coastal Plain	Least Concern
Cupressaceae	Juniperus virginiana L.	Eastern Red Cedar	State-wide	Least Concern
Arecaceae	Sabal palmetto (Walt.) Lodd. ex Schult. & Schult.f.	Cabbage Palmetto	Outer Coastal Plain	G5 - Secure
Salicaceae	Populus deltoides W.Bartram ex Marshall	Eastern Cottonwood	Scattered state-wide	Least Concern
Salicaceae	Populus heterophylla L.	Swamp Cottonwood	Infrequently along Savannah River and coastal area	Least Concern
Salicaceae	Salix caroliniana Michx.	Coastal Plain Willow	Coastal Plain	Least Concern
Salicaceae	Salix floridana Chapm.	Florida Willow	Early County and Pulaski County	Vulnerable
Salicaceae	Salix nigra Marshall	Black Willow	State-wide	Least Concern
Salicaceae	Salix sericea Marshall	Silky Willow	A few counties in the Blue Ridge Mountains	Least Concern
Myricaceae	Myrica cerifera L.	Waxmyrtle, Southern Bayberry	Coastal Plain, lower Piedmont	Least Concern
Myricaceae	Myrica caroliniensis P. Mill.	Evergreen Bayberry	Coastal Plain	
Myricaceae	Myrica inodora W.Bartram	Odorless Bayberry	Infrequently in pine lowlands in southwest Georgia	G4 - Apparently Secure
Leitneriaceae	Leitneria floridana Chapm.	Corkwood	Lower Coastal Plain	Near Threatened
Juglandaceae	Carya aquatica (Michx. f.) Nutt.	Water Hickory	Lower Coastal Plain	Least Concern
Juglandaceae	Carya cordiformis (Wangenh.) K.Koch	Bitternut Hickory	Scattered state-wide	Least Concern
Juglandaceae	Carya glabra (Miller) Sweet	Pignut Hickory	State-wide	Least Concern
Juglandaceae	Carya laciniosa (Michaux f.) Loudon	Shellbark Hickory	Infrequently in northwest Georgia	Least Concern
Juglandaceae	Carya ovalis (Wangenh.) Sarg.	False Pignut Hickory, Red Hickory	State-wide	G5 - Secure
Juglandaceae	Carya ovata (Miller) K. Koch var. ovata	Shagbark Hickory	Piedmont to south-west Coastal Plain	G5 - Secure
Juglandaceae	Carya pallida (Ashe) Engelm. & Graebner	Sand Hickory	Scattered state-wide, more often in highlands or Piedmont	Least Concern
Juglandaceae	Carya tomentosa (Poiret) Nutt.	Mockernut Hickory, White Hickory	Common state-wide	Least Concern
Juglandaceae	Juglans cinerea L.	Butternut, White Walnut	Mountains.	Endangered
Juglandaceae	Juglans nigra L.	Black Walnut	Scattered state-wide	Least Concern
Betulaceae	Alnus serrulata (Aiton) Wiild.	Hazel Alder, Tag Alder	State-wide	Least Concern
Betulaceae	Betula alleghaniensis Britton	Yellow Birch	Mountain slopes above 3–4500 feet elevation	Least Concern
Betulaceae	Betula lenta L.	Black Birch, Sweet Birch	Mountainous areas of Ridge and Valley Province and Blue Ridge Mountains	Least Concern
Betulaceae	Betula nigra L.	River Birch	State-wide	Least Concern
Betulaceae	Carpinus caroliniana Walter	American Hornbeam, Ironwood, Musclewood	State-wide	Least Concern
Betulaceae	Ostrya virginiana (Miller) K. Koch	Eastern Hophornbeam	Piedmont and mountains	Least Concern
Fagaceae	Castanea dentata	American Chestnut	Before Chestnut blight, mountains and Piedmont	Critically Endangered
Fagaceae	Castanea pumila	Allegheny Chinquapin	Sporadically state-wide	G5 - Secure
Fagaceae	Fagus grandifolia	American Beech	Common in mountains and Piedmont, less common in Coastal Plain	Least Concern
Fagaceae	Quercus alba	White Oak, Stave Oak	Common state-wide	Least Concern
Fagaceae	Quercus arkansana	Arkansas Oak	Small, local stands in southwest Georgia	Vulnerable
Fagaceae	Quercus austrina Small	Bluff Oak, Bastard White Oak	Scattered in lower Coastal Plain	Vulnerable
Fagaceae	Quercus chapmanii Sarg.	Chapman Oak	Uncommon, appears in lower Coastal Plain	Least Concern
Fagaceae	Quercus coccinea Muenchh.	Scarlet Oak	Mountains and Piedmont	Least Concern
Fagaceae	Quercus falcata Michaux	Southern Red Oak, Spanish Oak	Common state-wide	Least Concern
Fagaceae	Quercus geminata Small	Sand Live Oak	Lower Coastal Plain	Least Concern
Fagaceae	Quercus georgiana M. A. Curtis	Georgia Oak	Granite outcrops in the Piedmont	Endangered
Fagaceae	Quercus hemisphaerica Bartram ex Willd.	Laurel Oak, Darlington Oak	Common throughout the Coastal Plain	Least Concern
Fagaceae	Quercus incana Bartram	Bluejack Oak	Common throughout the Coastal Plain	Least Concern
Fagaceae	Quercus laevis Walter	Turkey Oak	Common throughout the Coastal Plain	Least Concern
Fagaceae	Quercus laurifolia Michaux	Diamond Leaf Oak, Swamp Laurel Oak	Common in the Coastal Plain and occasionally in the Piedmont	Least Concern
Fagaceae	Quercus lyrata Walter	Overcup oak	Common in the Coastal Plain and occasionally in the Piedmont and Ridge and Valley Province	Least Concern
Fagaceae	Quercus margaretta Ashe	Sand Post Oak, Scrub Post Oak	Coastal Plain and Georgia Sandhills	Least Concern
Fagaceae	Quercus marilandica Muenchh.	Blackjack Oak	State-wide	Least Concern
Fagaceae	Quercus michauxii Nutt.	Swamp Chestnut Oak, Basket Oak	Scattered throughout state, particularly Coastal Plain and Piedmont	Least Concern
Fagaceae	Quercus muehlenbergii Engelm.	Chinquapin Oak	Uncommon, appearing in localities in northwest and southwest Georgia.	Least Concern
Fagaceae	Quercus myrtifolia Willd.	Myrtle Oak	Occasional along outer Coastal Plain	Least Concern
Fagaceae	Quercus nigra L.	Water oak	State-wide, more common in Coastal Plain and Piedmont	Least Concern
Fagaceae	Quercus oglethorpensis W.Duncan	Oglethrope Oak	Restricted to a few counties in the Piedmont near South Carolina	Endangered
Fagaceae	Quercus pagoda Raf.	Cherrybark Oak	Coastal Plain and Piedmont	Least Concern
Fagaceae	Quercus phellos L.	Willow Oak	State-wide	Least Concern
Fagaceae	Quercus montana Willd.	Chestnut Oak, Rock Chestnut Oak	Mountains and upper Piedmont	Least Concern
Fagaceae	Quercus rubra L.	Northern Red Oak	Common in Piedmont and mountains	Least Concern
Fagaceae	Quercus shumardii Buckley	Shumard Oak	Most common in Coastal Plain, but also found in Piedmont and Ridge and Valley Province	Least Concern
Fagaceae	Quercus stellata Wangenh.	Post Oak	State-wide	Least Concern
Fagaceae	Quercus velutina Lam.	Black Oak	State-wide	Least Concern
Fagaceae	Quercus virginiana Miller	Live Oak	Coastal Plain	Least concern
Ulmaceae	Celtis laevigata Willd.	Sugarberry	State-wide	Least Concern
Ulmaceae	Celtis occidentalis L.	Hackberry	Northwest Georgia and Piedmont	Least Concern
Ulmaceae	Celtis tenuifolia Nutt.	Georgia Hackberry	Rocky sites throughout the state	G5 - Secure
Ulmaceae	Planera aquatica (Walter) J. Gmelin.	Water-elm, Planer-tree	Coastal Plain	Least Concern
Ulmaceae	Ulmus alata Michaux	Winged Elm	Common state-wide at lower elevations	Least Concern
Ulmaceae	Ulmus americana L.	American elm	Common state-wide	Endangered
Ulmaceae	Ulmus rubra Muhlenb.	Slippery Elm	Primarily Piedmont and Coastal Plain	Least Concern
Ulmaceae	Ulmus serotina Sarg.	September Elm	Floyd County, Georgia	Least Concern
Moraceae	Morus rubra L.	Red mulberry	Sporadically throughout Georgia	Least Concern
Magnoliaceae	Liriodendron tulipifera L.	Yellow-poplar, Tulip-poplar	State-wide	Least Concern
Magnoliaceae	Magnolia acuminata L.	Cucumbertree	Blue Ridge Mountains and occasionally Piedmont	Least Concern
Magnoliaceae	Magnolia fraseri Walter	Fraser Magnolia	Blue Ridge Mountains	Least Concern
Magnoliaceae	Magnolia grandiflora L.	Southern Magnolia, Bull Bay	Native to Coastal Plain, but planted throughout the state	Least Concern
Magnoliaceae	Magnolia macrophylla Michaux	Bigleaf Magnolia	Uncommon, found in upper Piedmont and southwestern counties of the Coastal Plain	Least Concern
Magnoliaceae	Magnolia pyramidata Bartram	Pyramid Magnolia	Coastal Plain	Least Concern
Magnoliaceae	Magnolia tripetala L.	Umbrella Magnolia	Occasionally appears in Piedmont and lower mountains	Least Concern
Magnoliaceae	Magnolia virginiana L.	Sweetbay	Coastal Plain and Piedmont	Least Concern
Illiciaceae	Illicium floridanum Ellis	Anise-tree	Decatur County	Least Concern
Annonaceae	Asimina triloba Ellis	Pawpaw	Mountains and Piedmont	Least Concern
Lauraceae	Persea borbonia (L.) A. Sprengel	Red Bay	Coastal Plain	Least Concern
Lauraceae	Sassafras albidum (Nutt.) Nees	Sassafras	Scattered state-wide	Least Concern
Hamamelidaceae	Hamamelis virginiana L.	Witch-hazel	State-wide	Least Concern
Hamamelidaceae	Liquidambar styraciflua L.	Sweetgum	State-wide	Least Concern
Platanaceae	Platanus occidentalis L.	Sycamore, Planetree	State-wide	Least Concern
Rosaceae	Amelanchier arborea (Michaus f.) Fern.	Downy Serviceberry, Shadbush	Mountains and Piedmont	Least Concern
Rosaceae	Malus angustifolia (Aiton) Michaux	Southern Crab Apple	State-wide but less common in Coastal Plain	Least Concern
Rosaceae	Malus coronaria L.	Sweet Crab Apple	Blue Ridge Mountains	Least Concern
Rosaceae	Prunus americana Marshall	American Plum	Sporadically in Blue Ridge Mountains, Ridge and Valley, Piedmont, and sometimes in southwestern Coastal Plain	Least Concern
Rosaceae	Prunus angustifolia Marshall	Chickasaw Plum	Scattered state-wide	Least Concern
Rosaceae	Prunus caroliniana (Miller) Aiton	Carolina Laurel Cherry	Coastal Plain	Least Concern
Rosaceae	Prunus pensylvanica L. f.	Pin Cherry, Fire Cherry	Higher elevations in the Blue Ridge Mountains	Least Concern
Rosaceae	Prunus serotina Ehrh.	Black Cherry	State-wide	Least Concern
Rosaceae	Prunus umbellata Elliott	Flatwoods Plum, Hog Plum	Piedmont and Coastal Plain	Least Concern
Rosaceae	Sorbus americana Marshall	American mountain-ash, Rowan	Higher elevations in the Blue Ridge Mountains	Least Concern
Leguminosae	Cercis canadensis L.	Redbud, Judas Tree	State-wide	Least Concern
Leguminosae	Cladrastis kentukea (Dum.-Cours.) Rudd	Yellowwood	Rarely, in Ridge and Valley and Blue Ridge Mountains	G4 - Apparently Secure
Leguminosae	Gleditsia aquatica Marshall	Waterlocust	Confined to swamps of the Coastal Plain	Least Concern
Leguminosae	Gleditsia triacanthos L.	Honeylocust	Scattered state-wide	Least Concern
Leguminosae	Robinia pseudoacacia L.	Black Locust	Originally limited to mountains, but has been cultivated elsewhere in the state	Least Concern
Rutaceae	Ptelea trifoliata L.	Common Hoptree, Wafer Ash	Scattered throughout the state	Least Concern
Rutaceae	Zanthoxylum americanum Miller	Prickly-ash, Toothache-tree	Limited to a few counties in the Piedmont and upper Coastal Plain	Least Concern
Rutaceae	Zanthoxylum clava-herculis L.	Hercules'-club, Toothache-tree	Restricted to coastal counties and Southwest Georgia.	Least Concern
Anacardiaceae	Cotinus obovatus Raf.	Smoketree	Known from a single location on Pigeon Mountain	Least Concern
Anacardiaceae	Rhus copallinum L.	Winged Sumac, Dwarf Sumac, Shining Sumac	State-wide	G5 - Secure
Anacardiaceae	Rhus glabra L.	Smooth Sumac	Mountains and Piedmont	Least Concern
Anacardiaceae	Rhus typhina L.	Staghorn Sumac	Known from a single location on Yonah Mountain	Least Concern
Anacardiaceae	Toxicodendron vernix (L.) Kuntze	Poison Sumac, Thunderwood	Scattered throughout the state	Least Concern
Cyrillaceae	Cliftonia monophylla (Lam.) Britton ex Sarg.	Titi, Buckwheat-tree	Lower Coastal Plain	G4 - Apparently Secure
Cyrillaceae	Cyrilla racemiflora L.	Swamp Cyrilla, Red Titi	Wet areas of the Coastal Plain	Least Concern
Aquifoliaceae	Ilex ambigua (Michaux) Torrey	Carolina Holly	Coastal Plain	Least Concern
Aquifoliaceae	Ilex amelanchier M. A. Curtis	Sarvis Holly	Found in a few Coastal Plain counties	Least Concern
Aquifoliaceae	Ilex cassine L.	Dahoon	Coastal Plain	Least Concern
Aquifoliaceae	Ilex coriacea (Pursh) Chapman	Large Gallberry	Scattered throughout the Coastal Plain	Least Concern
Aquifoliaceae	Ilex decidua Walter	Possumhaw	State-wide	Least Concern
Aquifoliaceae	Ilex longipes Chapman ex Trel.	Georgia Holly	Uncommonly appears in Ridge and Valley	Least Concern
Aquifoliaceae	Ilex montana Torrey & Gray	Mountain Winterberry	Mountains	Least Concern
Aquifoliaceae	Ilex myrtifolia Walter	Myrtle-leaved Holly	Frequently in Coastal Plain	Least Concern
Aquifoliaceae	Ilex opaca Aiton	American Holly	Common state-wide	Least Concern
Aquifoliaceae	Ilex verticillata (L.) Gray	Common Winterberry	Blue Ridge Mountains and Piedmont	Least Concern
Aquifoliaceae	Ilex vomitoria Aiton	Yaupon	Outer Coastal Plain	Least Concern
Celastraceae	Euonymus atropurpureus Jacq.	Eastern Wahoo, Burningbush	Infrequent, appearing in scattered counties	Least Concern
Staphyleaceae	Staphylea trifolia L.	Bladdernut	Scattered in Ridge and Valley, Piedmont, and Cumberland Plateau	Least Concern
Aceraceae	Acer floridanum (Chapman) Pax.	Florida Maple, Southern Sugar Maple	Occasionally in Ridge and Valley and Piedmont	Least Concern
Aceraceae	Acer leucoderme Small	Chalk Maple	Piedmont	Least Concern
Aceraceae	Acer negundo L.	Boxelder	Piedmont	Least Concern
Aceraceae	Acer nigrum Michaux f.	Black Maple	Dade County, Georgia and Walker County, Georgia	Least Concern
Aceraceae	Acer pensylvanicum L.	Striped Maple	Higher elevations of the Blue Ridge Mountains	Least Concern
Aceraceae	Acer rubrum L.	Red Maple	Common state-wide	Least Concern
Aceraceae	Acer saccharinum L.	Silver Maple	Infrequently state-wide	Least Concern
Aceraceae	Acer saccharum Marsh.	Sugar Maple	Blue Ridge Mountains, Ridge and Valley, and upper Piedmont	Least Concern
Aceraceae	Acer spicatum L.	Mountain Maple	Towns County, Georgia and Union County, Georgia at higher elevations	Least Concern
Hippocastanaceae	Aesculus flava Solander ex Hope	Yellow Buckeye	Higher elevations in the mountains	Least Concern
Hippocastanaceae	Aesculus glabra Willd.	Ohio Buckeye, Fetid Buckeye	Walker County, Georgia	Least Concern
Hippocastanaceae	Aesculus parviflora Walter	Bottlebrush Buckeye	Southwestern Georgia along the Chattahoochee River	Least Concern
Hippocastanaceae	Aesculus pavia L.	Red Buckeye	Common in the Coastal Plain	Least Concern
Hippocastanaceae	Aesculus sylvatica Bartram	Painted Buckeye, Georgia Buckeye	Piedmont	Least Concern
Sapindaceae	Sapindus marginatus Willd.	Florida Soapberry	Rarely on the islands of Liberty County, Georgia	
Rhamnaceae	Frangula caroliniana (Walter) A.Gray	Carolina Buckthorn	Scattered throughout the state, mostly in Ridge and Valley and Piedmont	Least Concern
Tiliaceae	Tilia americana Miller	Basswood, Linden	State-wide, but mostly the mountains and Piedmont	Least Concern
Theaceae	Franklinia alatamaha Bartram ex Marshall	Franklinia, Franklin-tree	Extinct in the wild for about 200 years. Cultivated in the Coastal Plain	Extinct in the wild
Theaceae	Gordonia lasianthus (L.) Ellis	Loblolly-bay, Gordonia	Coastal Plain	Least Concern
Theaceae	Stewartia malacodendron L.	Virginia Stewartia, Silky Camellia	Uncommon, scattered in the Coastal Plain and Piedmont	Least Concern
Theaceae	Stewartia ovata (Cav.) Weatherby	Mountain Stewartia, Mountain-Camellia	Scattered state-wide	Least Concern
Araliaceae	Aralia spinosa L.	Devil's-walkingstick	Common state-wide	Least Concern
Nyssaceae	Nyssa aquatica L.	Water Tupelo	Wetlands of the Coastal Plain	Least Concern
Nyssaceae	Nyssa ogeche Bartram ex Marshall	Ogeechee Tupelo, Ogeechee-lime	Rivers of the lower Coastal Plain	Least Concern
Nyssaceae	Nyssa sylvatica Marshall var. sylvatica	Black Tupelo, Blackgum	Common state-wide	Least Concern
Nyssaceae	Nyssa biflora Walter	Swamp Tupelo, Swamp Black Gum	Swamps of the Coastal Plain	Least Concern
Cornaceae	Cornus alternifolia L. f.	Alternate-leaf Dogwood	Mountains and Piedmont	Least Concern
Cornaceae	Cornus drummondii C. A. Meyer	Roughleaf Dogwood	Dade County, Georgia	Least Concern
Cornaceae	Cornus florida L.	Flowering Dogwood	Common state-wide	Least Concern
Cornaceae	Cornus foemina Miller	Swamp Dogwood	Piedmont and Coastal Plain	Least Concern
Clethraceae	Clethra acuminata Michaux	Cinnamon Clethra, Sweet Pepperbush	White County, Georgia, Union County, Georgia, Towns County, Georgia, and Rabun County, Georgia	G4 - Apparently Secure
Ericaceae	Elliottia racemosa Muhlenb. ex Elliott	Elliottia, Georgia Plume	Tattnall County, Georgia	G2 - Imperiled
Ericaceae	Kalmia latifolia L.	Mountain Laurel	Common in mountains	Least Concern
Ericaceae	Lyonia ferruginea (Walter) Nutt.	Tree Lyonia, Staggerbush	Coast and flatwoods of lower Coastal Plain	G5 - Secure
Ericaceae	Oxydendrum arboreum (L.) DC.	Sourwood	State-wide	Least Concern
Ericaceae	Rhododendron catawbiense Michaux	Purple Rhododendron	Blue Ridge Mountains	Least Concern
Ericaceae	Rhododendron maximum L.	Rosebay Rhododendron	Mountains	Least Concern
Ericaceae	Vaccinium arboreum Marshall	Huckleberry, Sparkleberry	Common state-wide	Least Concern
Sapotaceae	Sideroxylon lanuginosum	Gum Bumelia	Coastal Plain	G4 - Apparently Secure
Sapotaceae	Sideroxylon lycioides (L.) Pers.	Buckthorn Bumelia	Ridge and Valley and Piedmont	Least Concern
Sapotaceae	Sideroxylon tenax (L.) Willd.	Tough Bumelia	Coastal counties	G3 - Vulnerable
Ebenaceae	Diospyros virginiana L.	Persimmon	State-wide	G5 - Secure
Styracaceae	Halesia carolina L.	Carolina Silverbell	Mountains	Least Concern
Styracaceae	Halesia diptera Ellis	Two-wing Silverbell	Coastal Plain	Least Concern
Styracaceae	Halesia carolina L.	Little Silverbell	Sporadically in Coastal Plain	Least Concern
Styracaceae	Styrax americanus Lam.	American Snowbell	Piedmont and Coastal Plain	Least Concern
Styracaceae	Styrax grandifolius Aiton	Bigleaf Snowbell	State-wide	Least Concern
Symplocos	Symplocos tinctoria (L.) L'Her	Horse-sugar, Sweetleaf	State-wide	G5 - Secure
Oleaceae	Chionanthus virginicus L.	Fringe Tree, Old-man's-beard	Occasional throughout the state	G5 - Secure
Oleaceae	Forestiera acuminata (Michaux) Poiret	Swamp-privet	Scattered localities in the Coastal Plain	Least Concern
Oleaceae	Fraxinus americana L.	White Ash	Mountains and Piedmont	Critically Endangered
Oleaceae	Fraxinus caroliniana Miller	Carolina Ash	Coastal Plain	Endangered
Oleaceae	Fraxinus pennsylvanica Marshall	Green Ash	State-wide	Critically Endangered
Oleaceae	Fraxinus profunda (Bush) Bush	Pumpkin Ash	Infrequently along the coast	Critically Endangered
Oleaceae	Fraxinus quadrangulata Michaux	Blue Ash	Northwest Georgia	Critically Endangered
Oleaceae	Cartrema americana (L.) Gray	Devilwood	Coastal Plain	G5 - Secure
Bignoniaceae	Catalpa bignonioides Walter	Southern Catalpa, Indian-bean	Native to southwest Georgia, now found state-wide	G4 - Apparently Secure
Rubiaceae	Cephalanthus occidentalis L.	Buttonbush	State-wide	Least Concern
Rubiaceae	Pinckneya bracteata (Bartram) Raf.	Pinckneya, Fever-tree	Wet areas of the Coastal Plain	Least Concern
Caprifoliaceae	Sambucus canadensis L.	Elderberry, American Elder	Common state-wide	T5 - Secure Subspecies
Caprifoliaceae	Viburnum nudum L.	Possumhaw Virbunum	Scattered state-wide	Least Concern
Caprifoliaceae	Viburnum obovatum Walter	Virbunum, Small-leaf Virbunum	Coastal Plain	G5 - Secure
Caprifoliaceae	Viburnum prunifolium L.	Blackhaw	Scattered in the Piedmont	Least Concern
Caprifoliaceae	Viburnum rufidulum Raf.	Rusty Blackhaw	Scattered state-wide	Least Concern

== Introduced, naturalized, and invasive trees ==
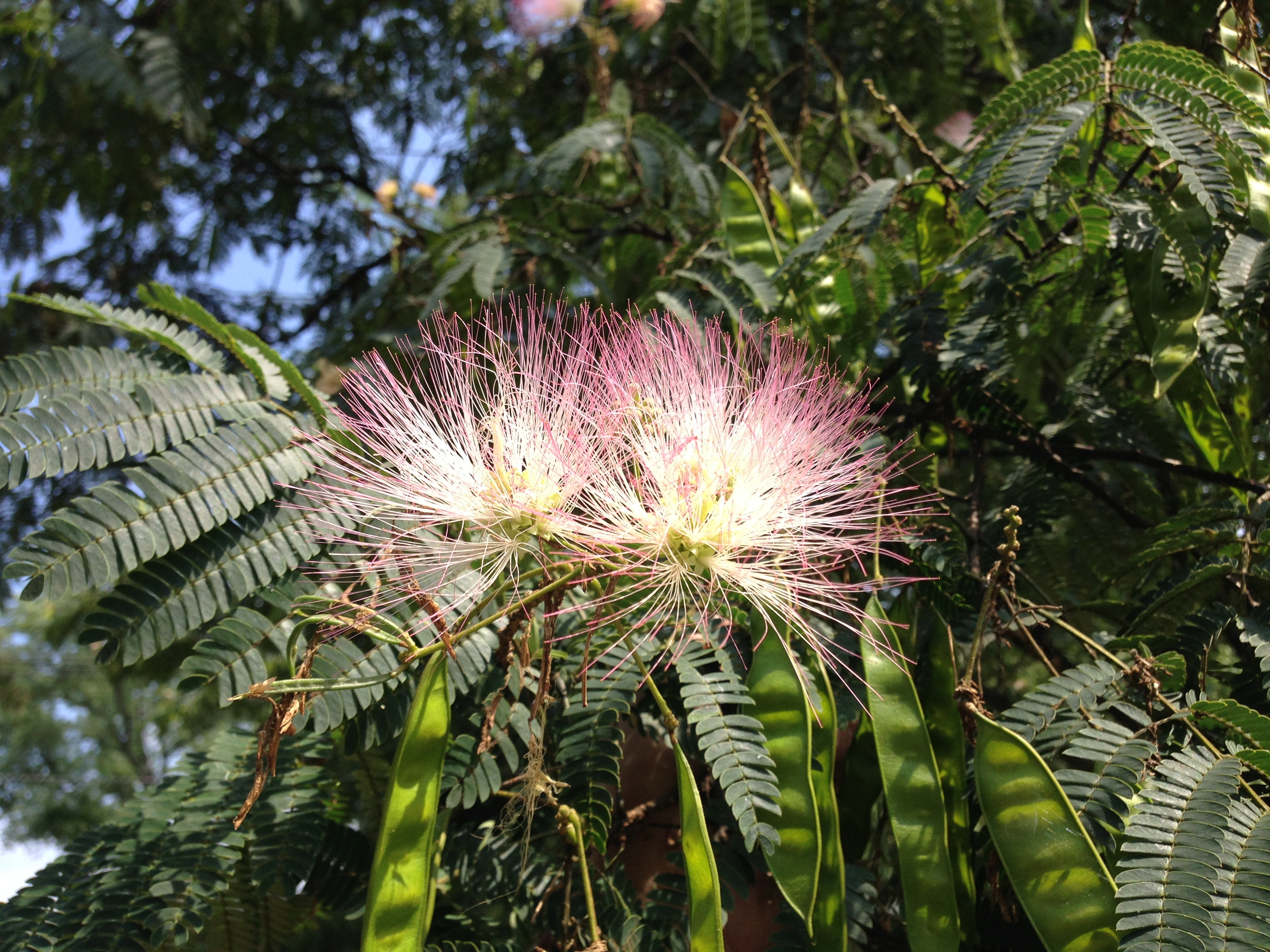
Albizia julibrissin, an invasive species in Georgia

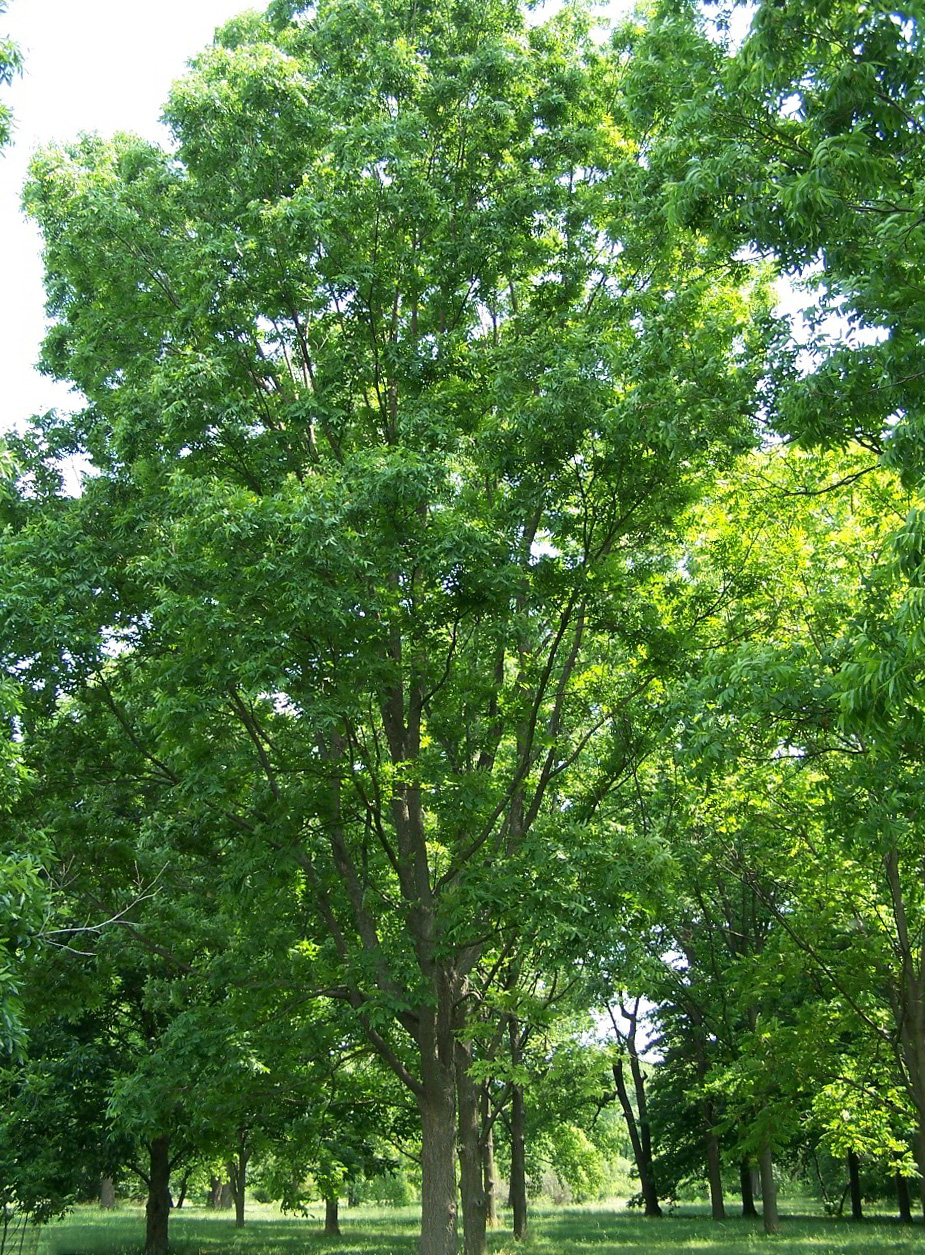
Carya illinoinensis, a cultivated species in Georgia

Family	Scientific name	Common names
Simaroubaceae	Ailanthus altissima (Miller) Swingle	Tree-of-Heaven
Fabaceae	Albizia julibrissin Durazzini	Mimosa, Silk tree
Euphorbiaceae	Aleurites fordii Hemsl.	Tung-oil Tree
Moraceae	Broussonetia papyrifera (L.) Vent.	Paper Mulberry
Juglandaceae	Carya illinoinensis (Wangengh.) K. Koch	Pecan
Bignoniaceae	Catalpa speciosa (Warder ex Barney) Engelm.	Northern Catalpa
Lauraceae	Cinnamomum camphora (L.) J. Presl.	Camphor-tree
Rutaceae	Citrus aurantium L.	Sour Orange
Sterculiaceae	Firmiana simplex (L.) W. F. Wright	Chinese Parasoltree
Malvaceae	Hibiscus syriacus L.	Rose of Sharon
Aquifoliaceae	Ilex cornuta Lindl. & Paxton	Chinese holly
Aquifoliaceae	Ilex crenata Thunb.	Chinese holly
Lythraceae	Lagerstroemia indica L.	Crapemyrtle
Oleaceae	Ligustrum sinense Lour.	Chinese Privet
Moraceae	Maclura pomifera (Raf.) Schneider	Osage-orange
Meliaceae	Melia azedarach L.	Chinaberry
Moraceae	Morus alba L.	White Mulberry
Scrophulariaceae	Paulownia tomentosa (Thunb.) Siebold & Zucc. ext Steud.	Princess-Tree
Pinaceae	Pinus clausa Vasey ex Sarg.	Sand Pine
Rutaceae	Poncirus trifoliata (L.) Raf.	Trifoliate Orange
Salicaceae	Populus alba L.	White Poplar
Salicaceae	Populus nigra L.	Black Poplar
Rosaceae	Pyrus calleryana	Bradford pear, Callery pear
Fagaceae	Quercus acutissima Carruthers	Sawtooth Oak
Euphorbiaceae	Sapium sebiferum (L.) Roxb.	Chinese Tallowtree
Tamaricaceae	Tamarix gallica L.	Tamarisk
Ulmaceae	Ulmus parvifolia Jacq.	Chinese elm
Euphorbiaceae	Vernicia fordii (Hemsl.) Airy-Shaw	Tungoil Tree

== See also ==
- Atlanta tree canopy
- Natural history of Georgia (U.S. state)
- Category:Individual trees in Georgia (U.S. state)
