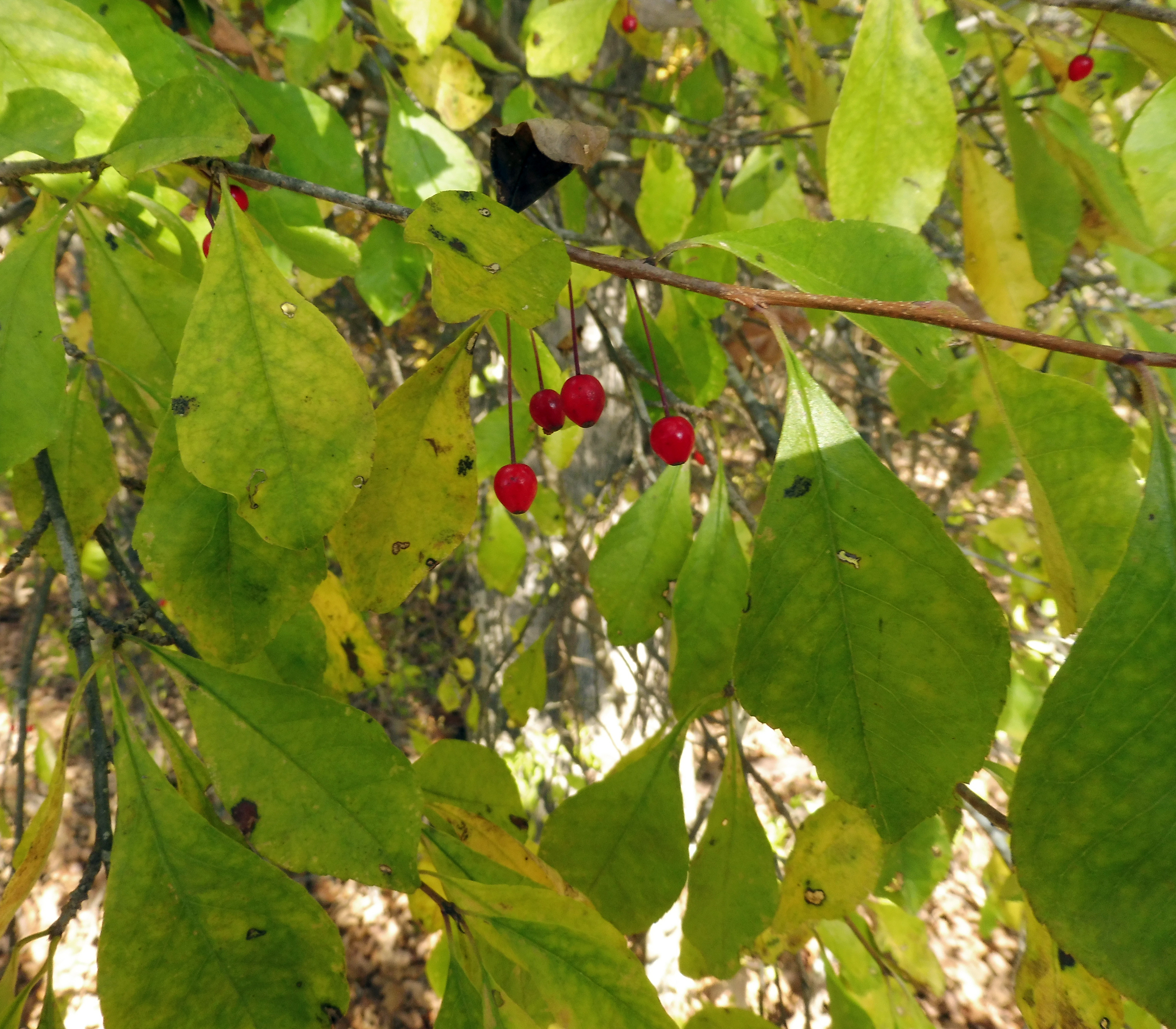

Conservation status
- Least Concern (IUCN 3.1)

Scientific classification
- Kingdom: Plantae
- Clade: Tracheophytes
- Clade: Angiosperms
- Clade: Eudicots
- Clade: Asterids
- Order: Aquifoliales
- Family: Aquifoliaceae
- Genus: Ilex
- Species: I. longipes

Binomial name
- Ilex longipes Chapm. ex Trel.

= Ilex longipes =

Species of holly

Ilex longipes, commonly called the Georgia holly or Chapman's holly, is a species of plant in the holly family. It is native to the southeastern United States, where it has a patchy distribution. It is typically found in upland forests.

Ilex longipes is a large shrub or small tree. It produces small white flowers in the spring and red berries in the fall.

It has a similar appearance to Ilex cuthbertii and Ilex decidua, which it is sometimes considered a variety of.
