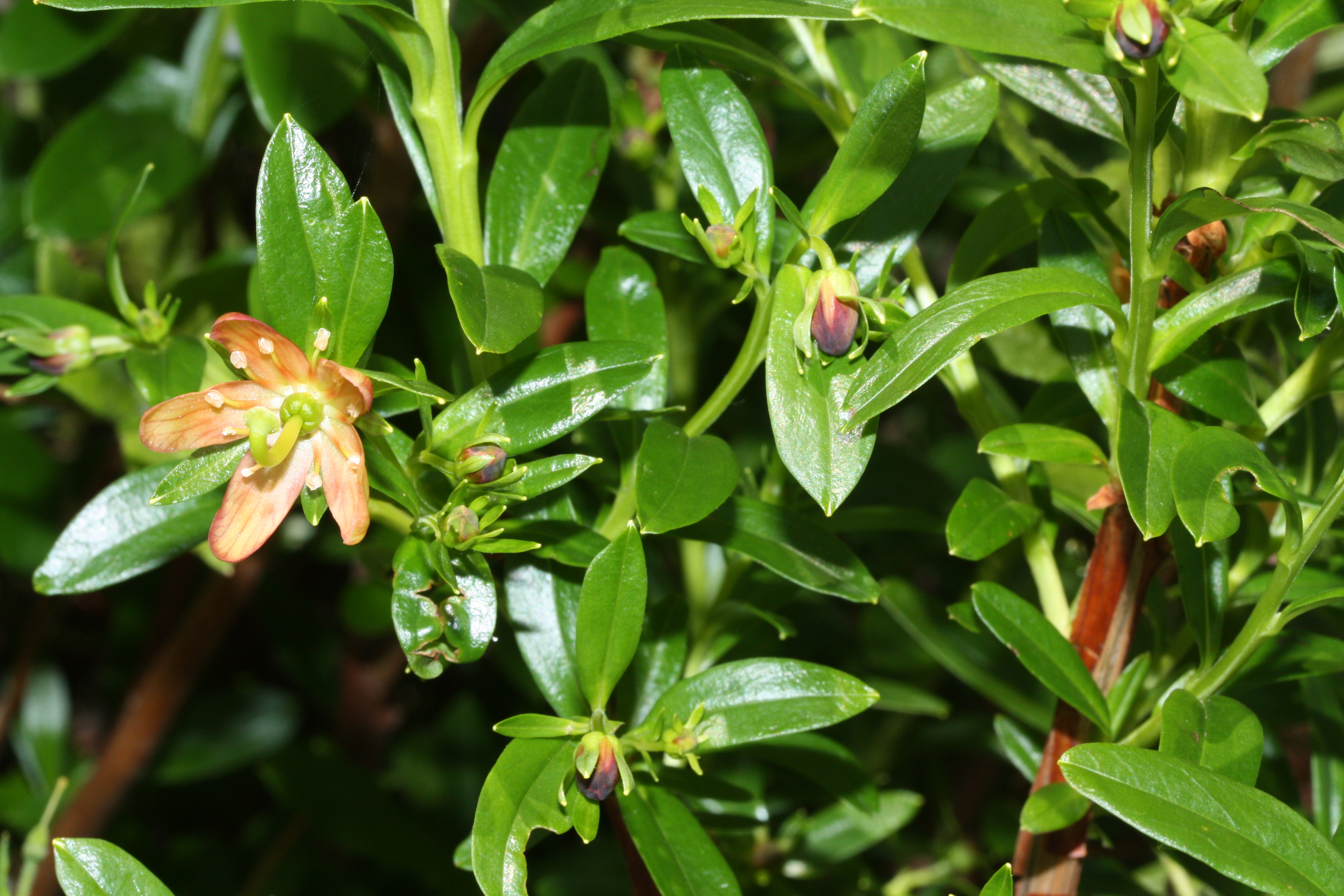
- Elliottia pyroliflora

Scientific classification
- Kingdom: Plantae
- Clade: Tracheophytes
- Clade: Angiosperms
- Clade: Eudicots
- Clade: Asterids
- Order: Ericales
- Family: Ericaceae
- Subfamily: Ericoideae
- Tribe: Phyllodoceae
- Genus: Elliottia; Muhl. ex Elliot

Synonyms
- List: Botryostege Stapf; Cladothamnus Bong.; Tolmiea Hook.; Tripetaleia Siebold & Zucc.

= Elliottia =

Genus of plants

Elliottia is a genus of plants in the Ericaceae, with four species, two in North America and two in Japan. It is named after botanist Stephen Elliott.

== Species ==
The genus consists of the following species:

- Elliottia bracteata, native to Japan
- Elliottia paniculata, native to Japan
- Elliottia pyroliflora, native to western North America
- Elliottia racemosa, a rare species of southeastern North America
