= Possumhaw =

Possumhaw is a common name for several plants and may refer to:

- Ilex decidua
- Ilex verticillata
- Viburnum nudum
