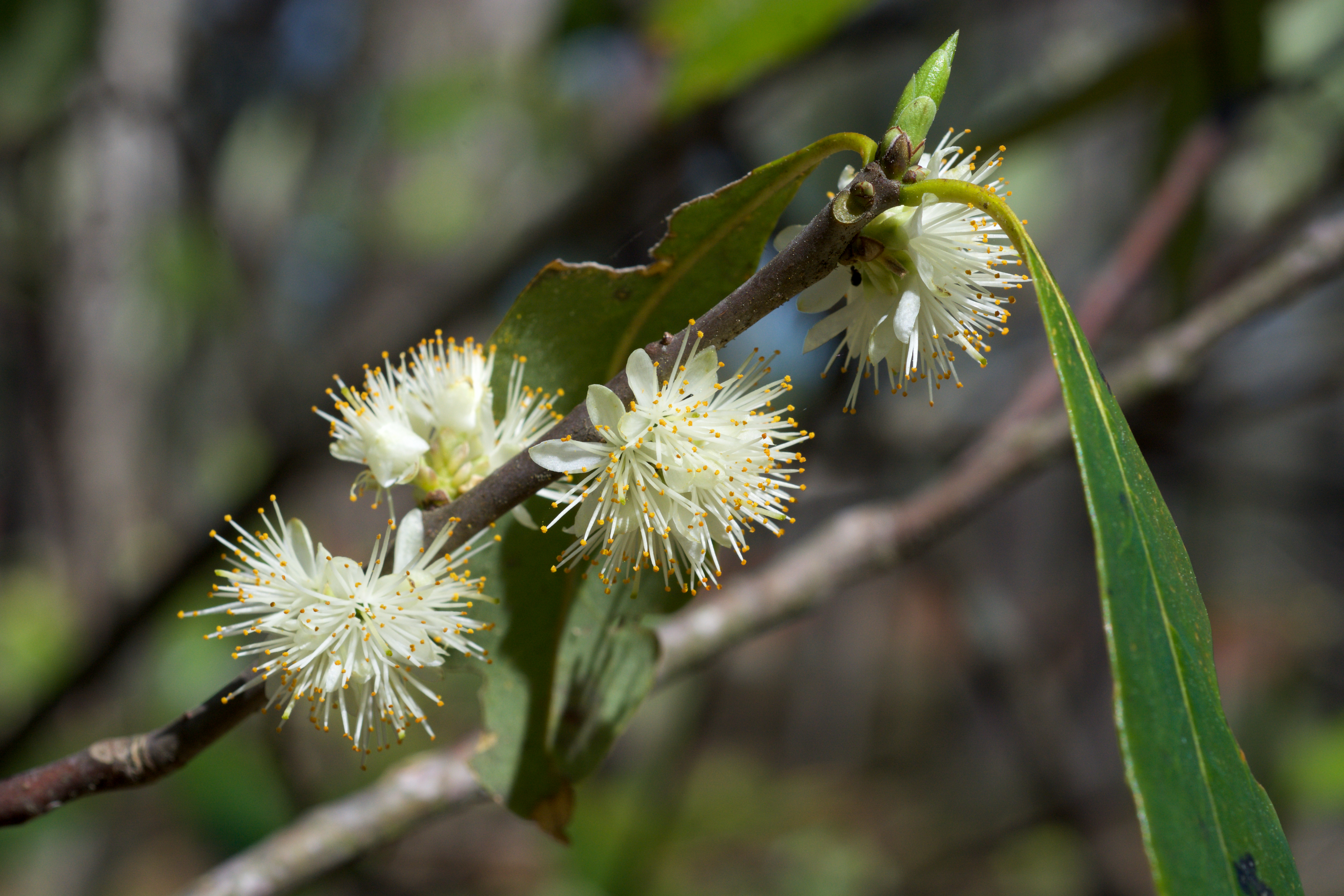

Conservation status
- Secure (NatureServe)

- Least Concern (IUCN 3.1)

Scientific classification
- Kingdom: Plantae
- Clade: Tracheophytes
- Clade: Angiosperms
- Clade: Eudicots
- Clade: Asterids
- Order: Ericales
- Family: Symplocaceae
- Genus: Symplocos
- Species: S. tinctoria

Binomial name
- Symplocos tinctoria (L.) L'Her.

= Symplocos tinctoria =

Species of plant

Symplocos tinctoria (the common sweetleaf, horse-sugar, or yellowwood) is a deciduous or evergreen shrub or tree. It is recognized by pith of twigs chambered; by foliage not notably aromatic when bruised, leaves finely hairy beneath. Shrubs or trees to 17 m tall by 36 cm diameter at breast height. The largest first-year twigs are under 3 mm across, terminal buds with acute tip, scales ciliate. Leaves are 7–15 cm long, margin entire or occasionally some teeth on the apical half, with a sweet taste that may be faint in old leaves. It is conspicuous when in flower; flowers opening before new leaves develop, fragrant, in clusters from axils of previous year's leaves or from just above the leaf scars if the leaves have fallen; the petals are creamy yellow to yellow, with one pistil. Fruits nearly cylindrical to ellipsoid drupes 8–12 mm long, with thin pulp and a hard stone containing one seed; the tip usually retaining parts of the sepals. Foliage is relished by browsing wildlife. A yellow dye may be obtained from bark and leaves. It flowers March to May.

== Distribution and habitat ==
Symplocos tinctoria is native to the southern and eastern United States, to an area from Oklahoma east to Florida and north to Maryland. Occasional, plants are often scattered; uncommonly grouped; thin to dense woods of slopes, bluffs, broad-leaf woods of sandy soils, stream borders and stable dunes. It is the only native representative of the genus in North America.

== Ecology ==
The foliage is relished by browsing wildlife. The branches are parasitised by galls of Exobasidium symploci that visually resemble fruits of the plant.

== Uses ==
A yellow dye was once made from the bark and leaves. The bark was used as a tonic by early American settlers.

== Gallery ==
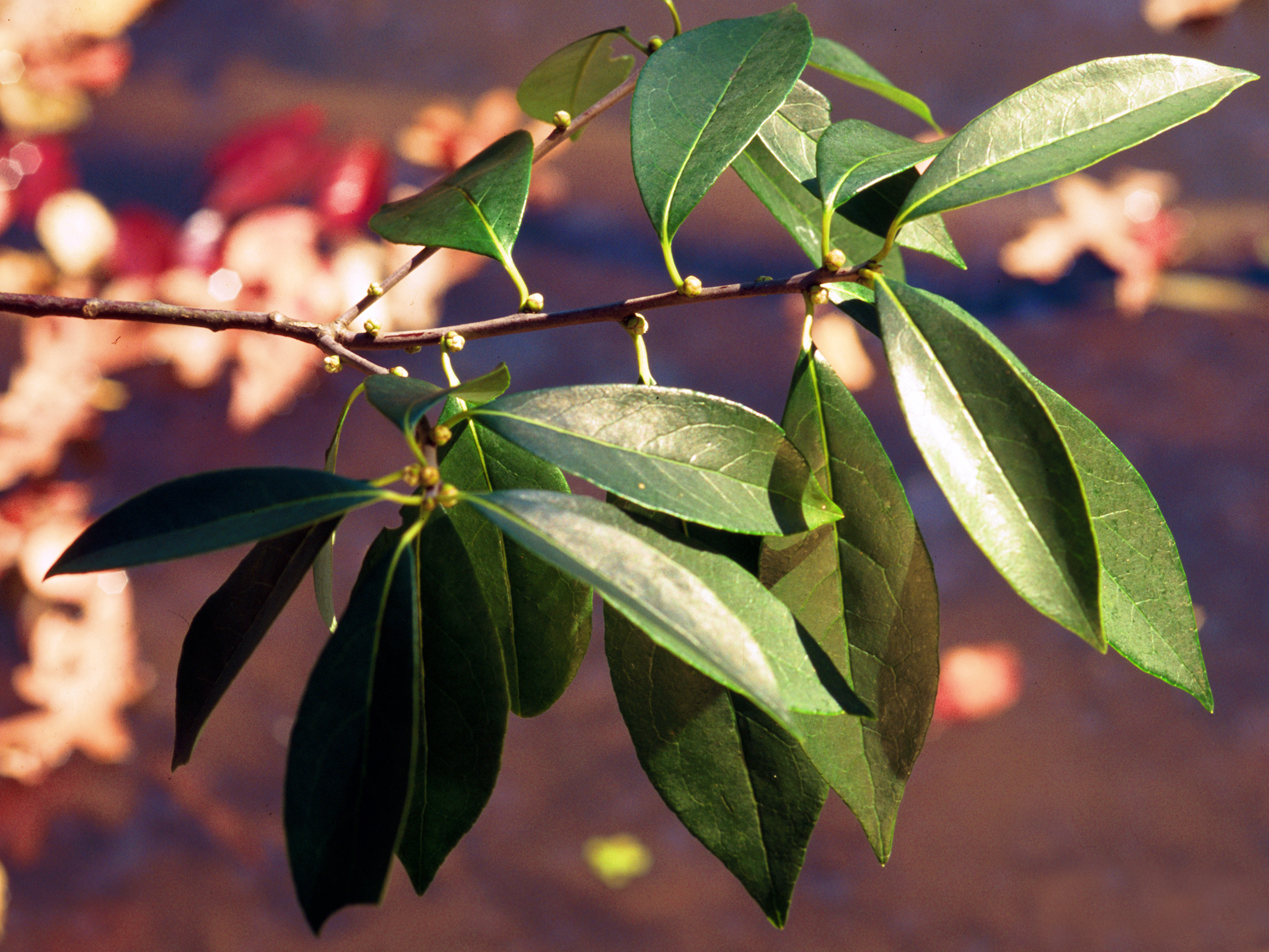

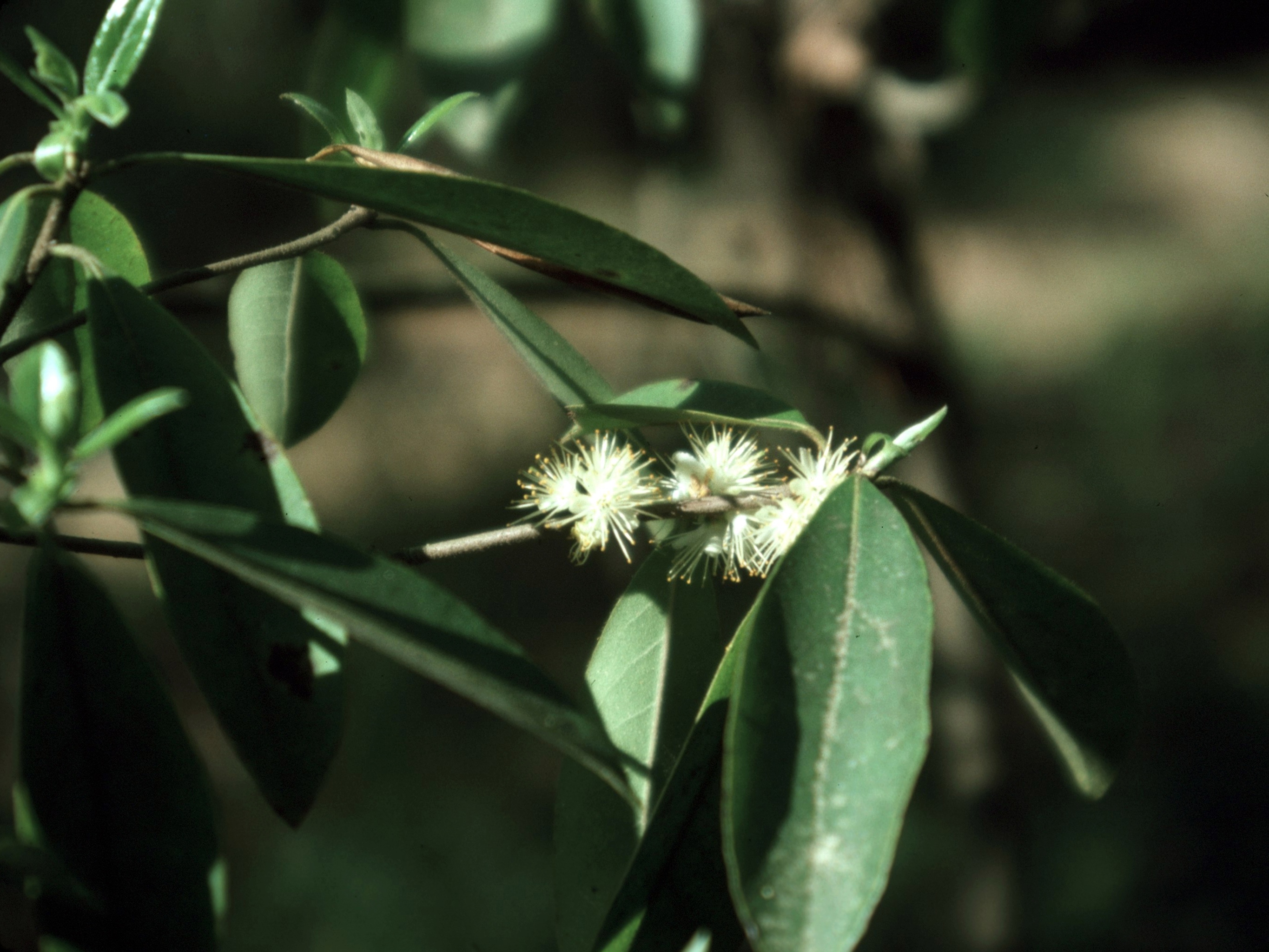

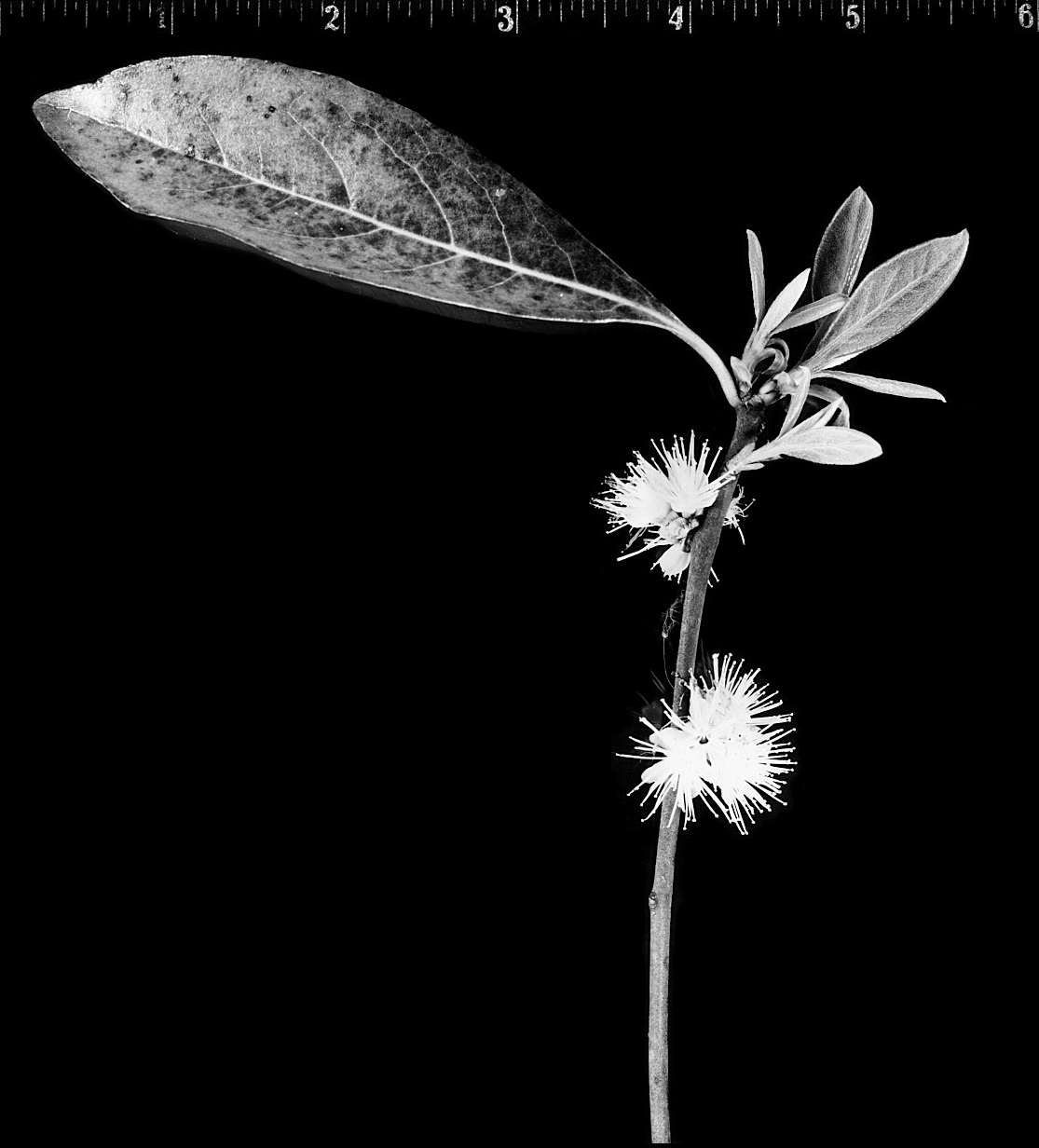

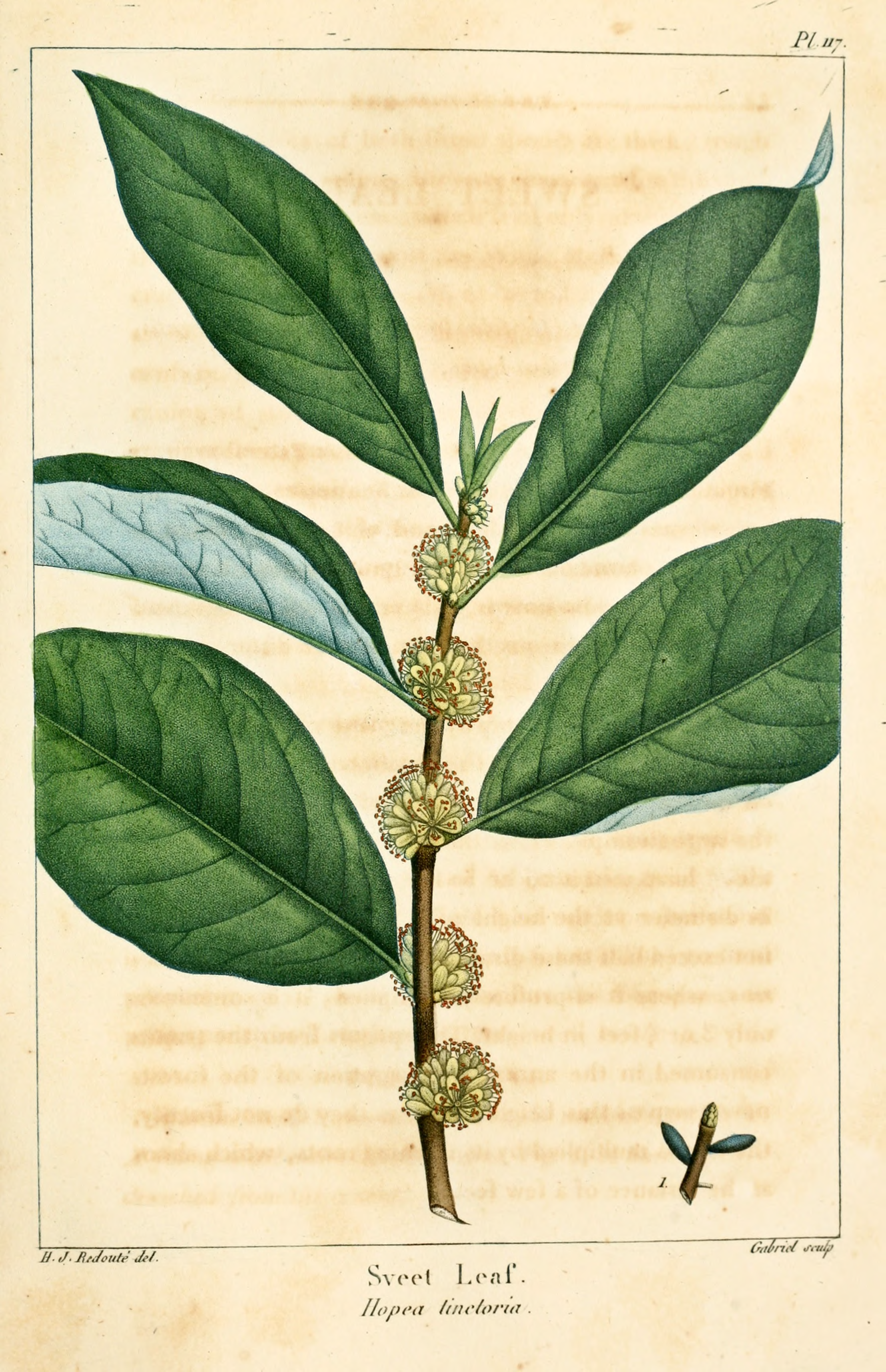

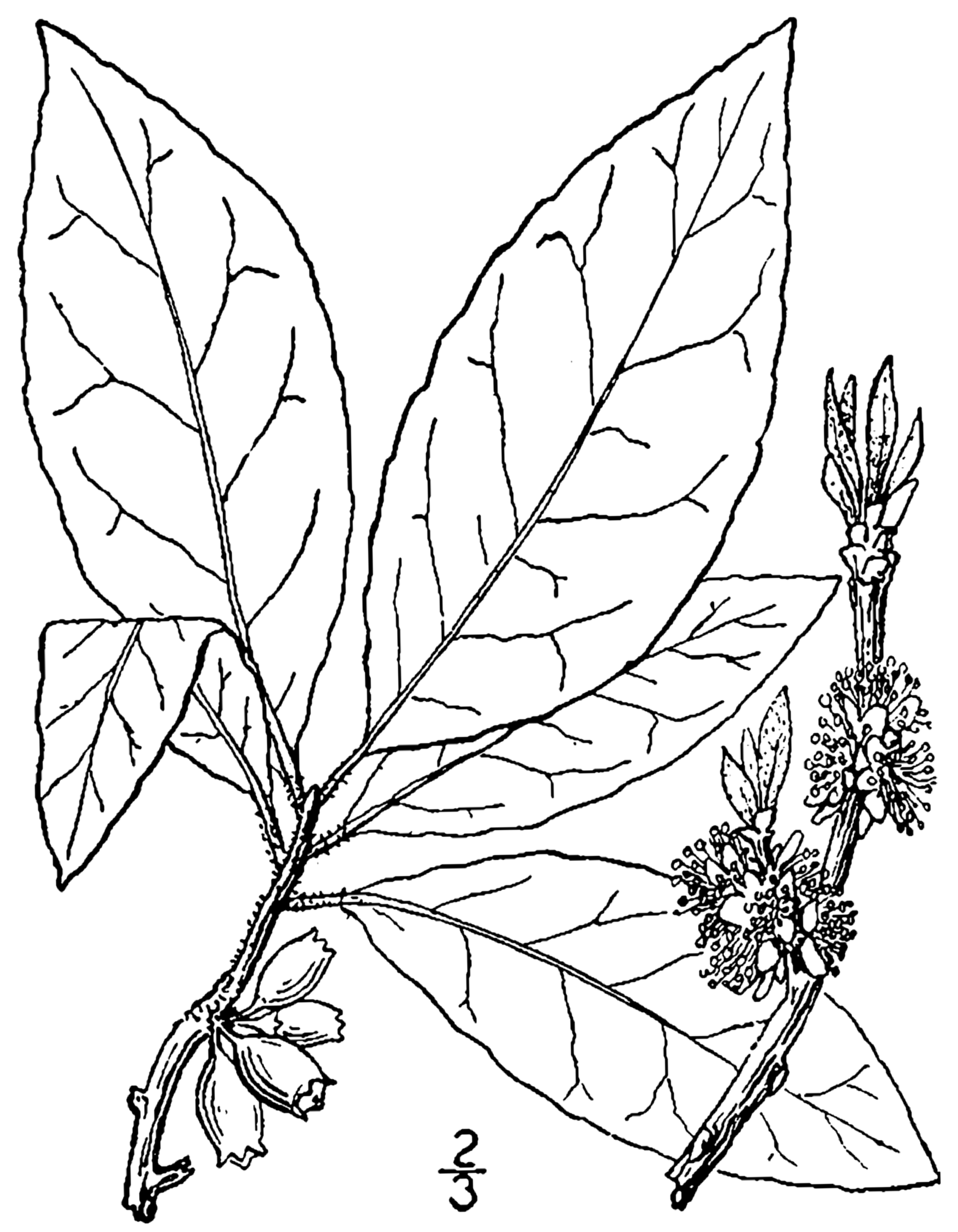

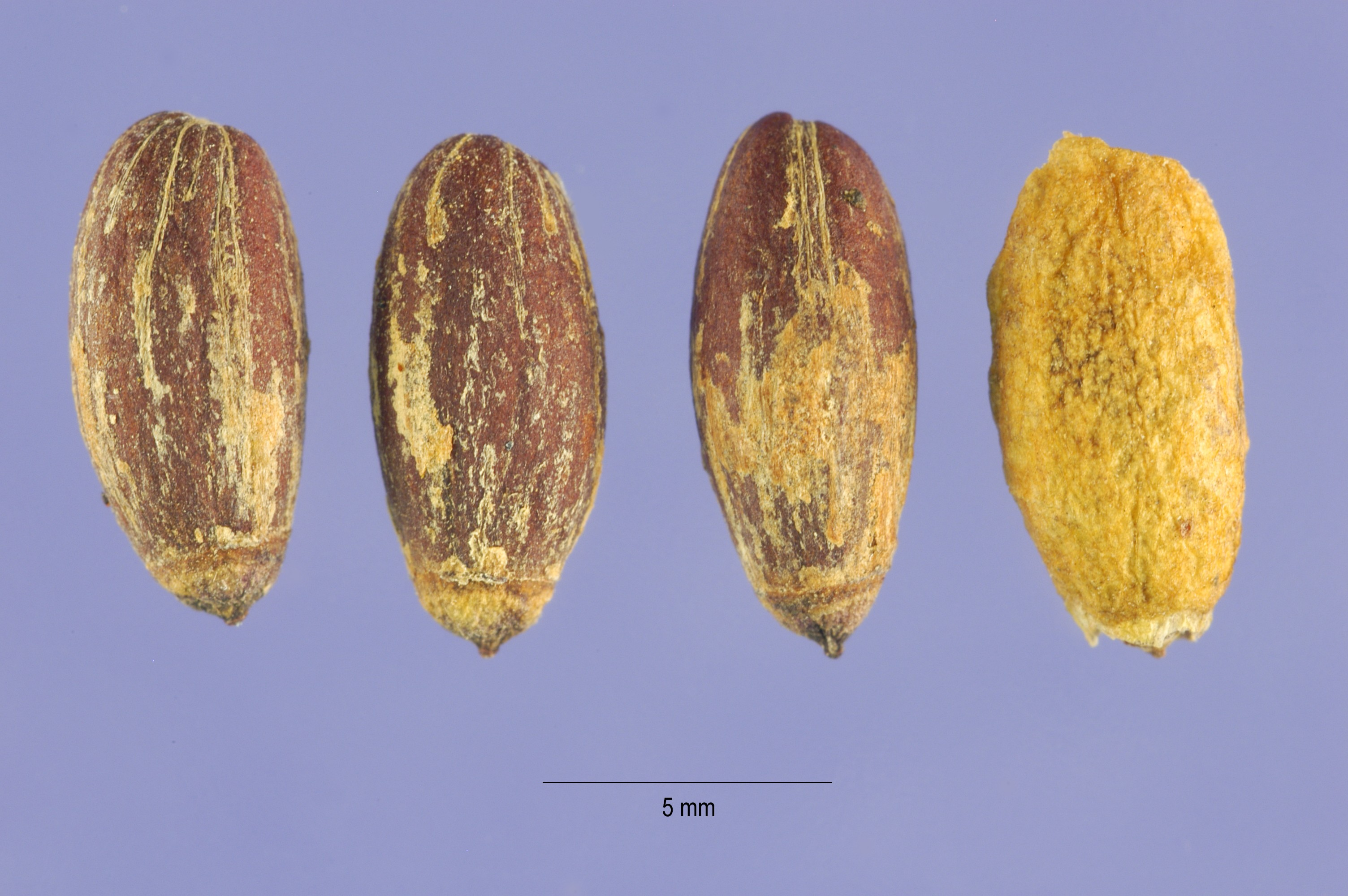
