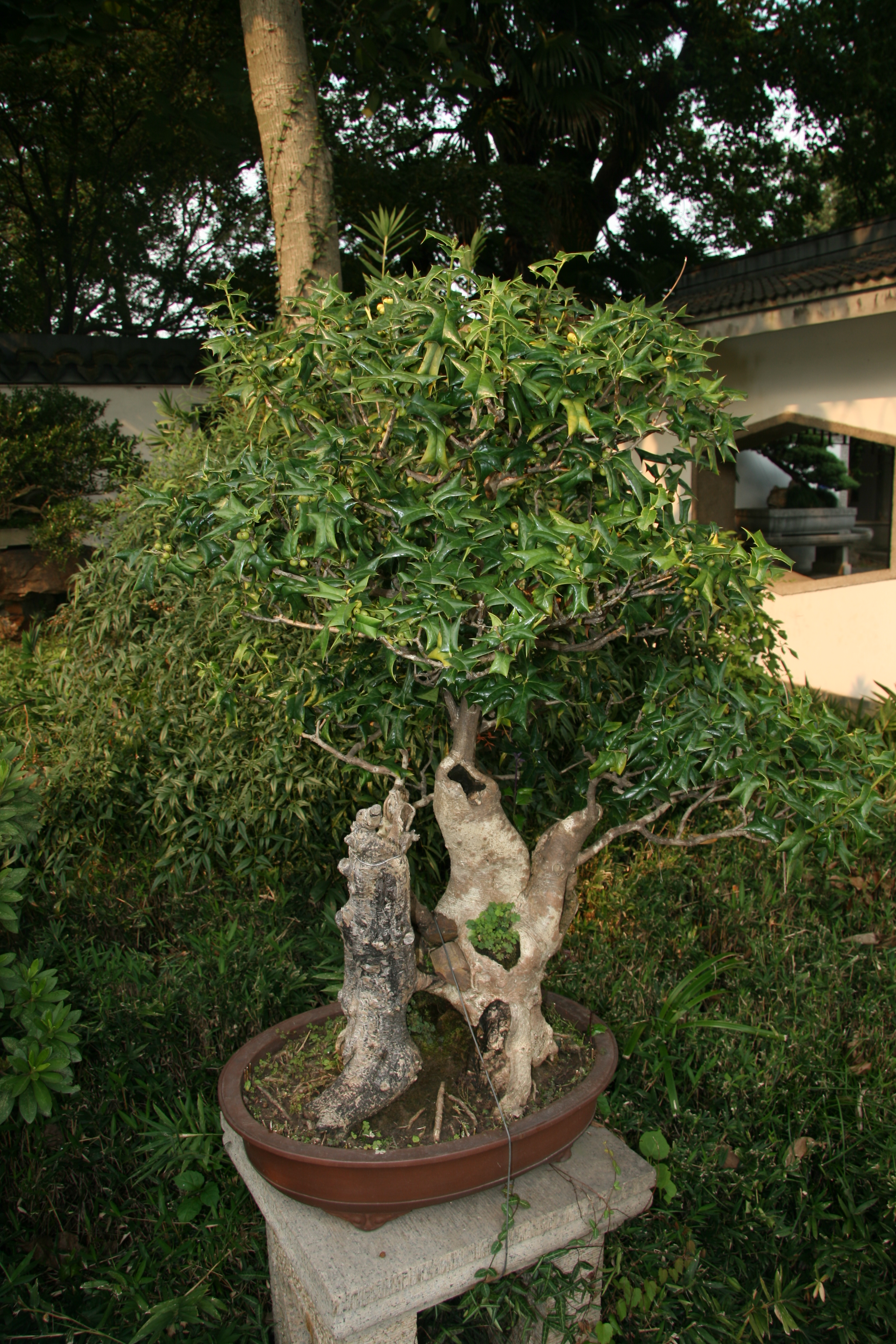
- As penjing, Shanghai Botanical Garden.
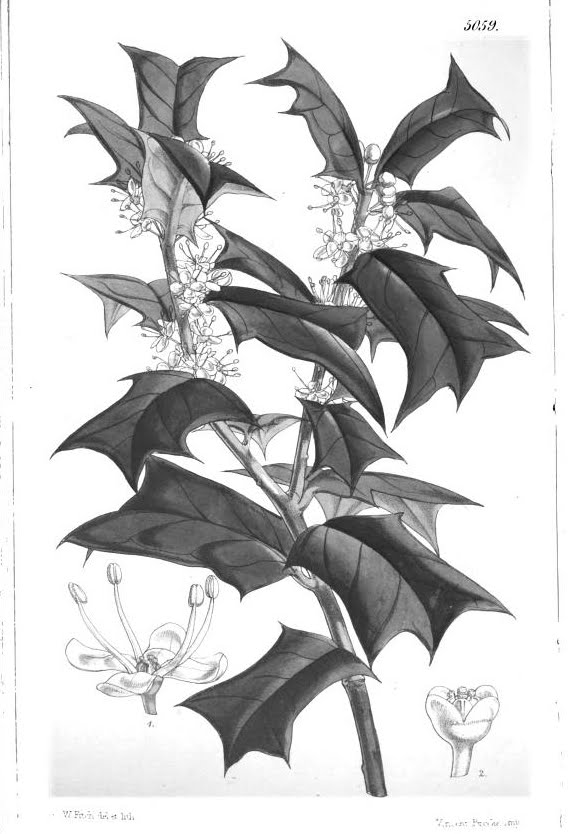
- Flowers and leaves of Chinese holly.

Scientific classification
- Kingdom: Plantae
- Clade: Tracheophytes
- Clade: Angiosperms
- Clade: Eudicots
- Clade: Asterids
- Order: Aquifoliales
- Family: Aquifoliaceae
- Genus: Ilex
- Species: I. cornuta

Binomial name
- Ilex cornuta Lindl.

Synonyms
- Ilex fortunei Lindl.; Ilex furcata Lindl. ex Goepp.; Ilex reevesiana Fortune; Skimmia fortunei Mast.; Skimmia hainanensis C.C. Huang; Skimmia orthoclada Hayata; Skimmia reevesiana (Fortune) Fortune

= Ilex cornuta =

Species of holly

Ilex cornuta
- Chinese: 枸骨
Transcriptions
Standard Mandarin
- Hanyu Pinyin: gǒugǔ
Yue: Cantonese
- Yale Romanization: gáu-gwāt

Ilex cornuta, commonly known as Chinese holly or horned holly, is a slow-growing, densely foliaged evergreen shrub in the Aquifoliaceae plant family. It is native to eastern China and Korea and attains a height of about 3 metres (9.8 ft). The leaves are usually 5-spined (sometimes 4), between 3.5 cm and 10 cm long, oblong and entire. The fruits are red berries, which are larger than those of the European Holly (Ilex aquifolium).

Ilex cornuta is valued horticulturally for its attractive and distinctive rectangular foliage and for its large red berries. Several cultivars and hybrids have been introduced by the horticultural trade, including 'Burfordii' (compact and free-fruiting), 'Dazzler' (large fruits), 'Dwarf Burfordii' (particularly compact), and 'Nellie R. Stevens' (a hybrid with I. aquifolium, very free-fruiting).

Ilex cornuta and its cultivars will tolerate a wide variety of soils and will grow in sun or shade.

== Description ==
Ilex cornuta is a broadleaf evergreen shrub that can grow up to 2.5 metres (8 ft) tall. It has been recorded as growing up to 7.6 metres (25 ft) tall. Leaves are rectangular that have 4 to 5 spines on the leaf margin. The glossy and leathery leaves are simple and alternate on the stem. Flowers begin to bloom during the early spring and are a dull white color and have a fragrance. The flowers produce red berries that ripen in early fall.

The bark is a light gray color and smooth. As it grows, the bark turns into a finely flaky appearance. The stem of Ilex cornuta is either green or a red to burgundy color depending on the season. The green stems turn slightly more red during the winter months.

Ilex cornuta is dioecious, meaning the flowers found on the shrub are either female or male. Male and female flowers are not found together on the same plant, so the plant is not self-fertile, it takes a male and a female plant to reproduce.

== Distribution and habitat ==
Ilex cornuta is native to the central and southeastern parts of China, Hainan, and Korea. Ilex cornuta was introduced to the United States and is currently considered invasive. It has been observed naturalized in the eastern United States, found most prominently in North Carolina, Alabama, and Kentucky.

Ilex cornuta is tolerant of most soils except those that are poorly drained. It can be grown in partial and full sun and is tolerant of the heat and humidity. The shrub can be found between 150 and 600 meters elevation and along mountain ridges that have full sun.

== Landscape uses ==
Ilex cornuta is used for winter interest and drought tolerant gardens, as barriers, for privacy, and hedges. The Chinese holly can attract bees, other pollinators, songbirds, and specialized bees. The biggest problem with Chinese holly in the landscape are its spines.

== Conservation status ==
According to the IUCN red list, the Ilex cornuta is of least concern. Its population trend is considered stable during the last assessment in 2018.
