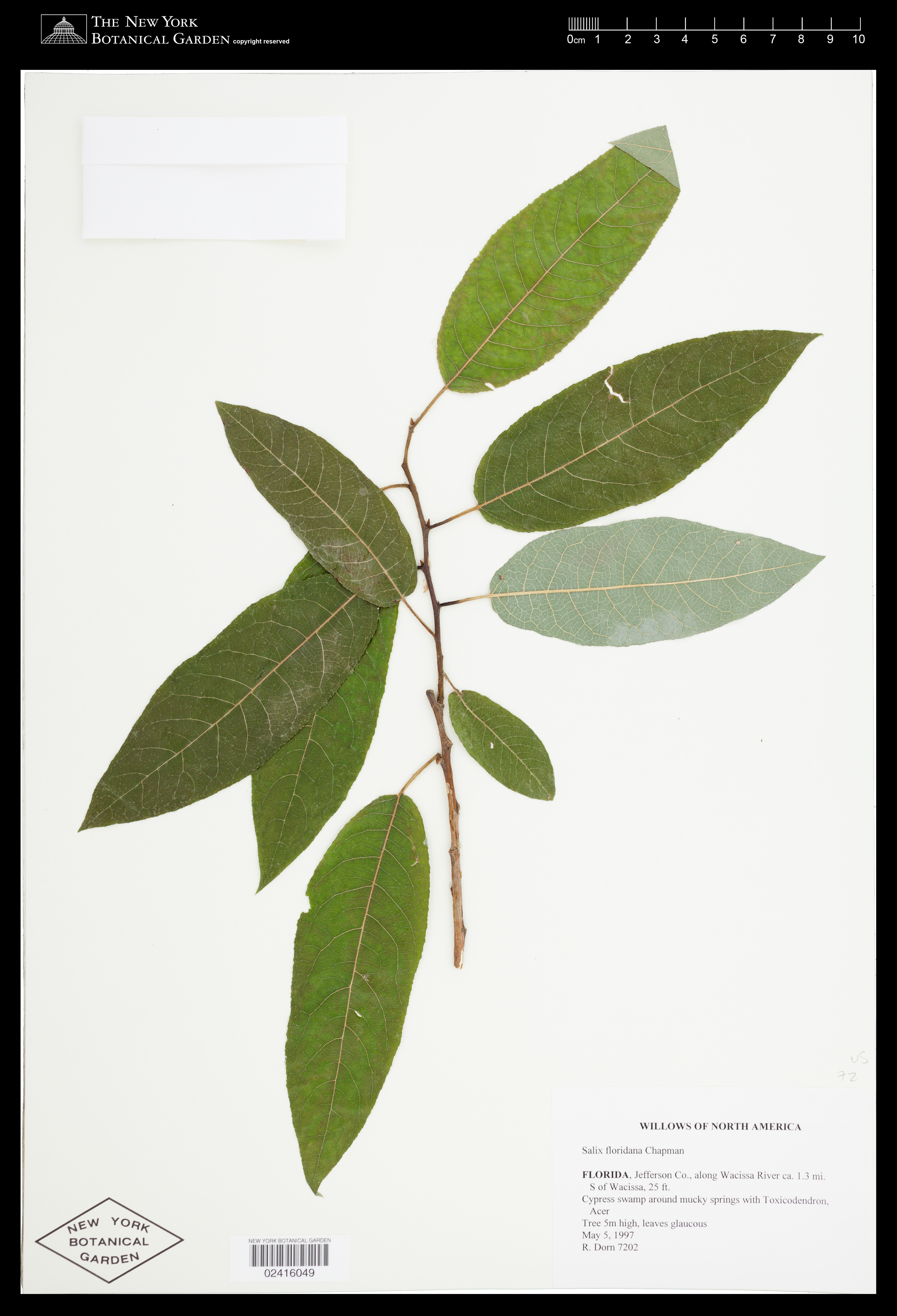

Conservation status
- Endangered (IUCN 3.1)

Scientific classification
- Kingdom: Plantae
- Clade: Tracheophytes
- Clade: Angiosperms
- Clade: Eudicots
- Clade: Rosids
- Order: Malpighiales
- Family: Salicaceae
- Genus: Salix
- Species: S. floridana

Binomial name
- Salix floridana Chapm.
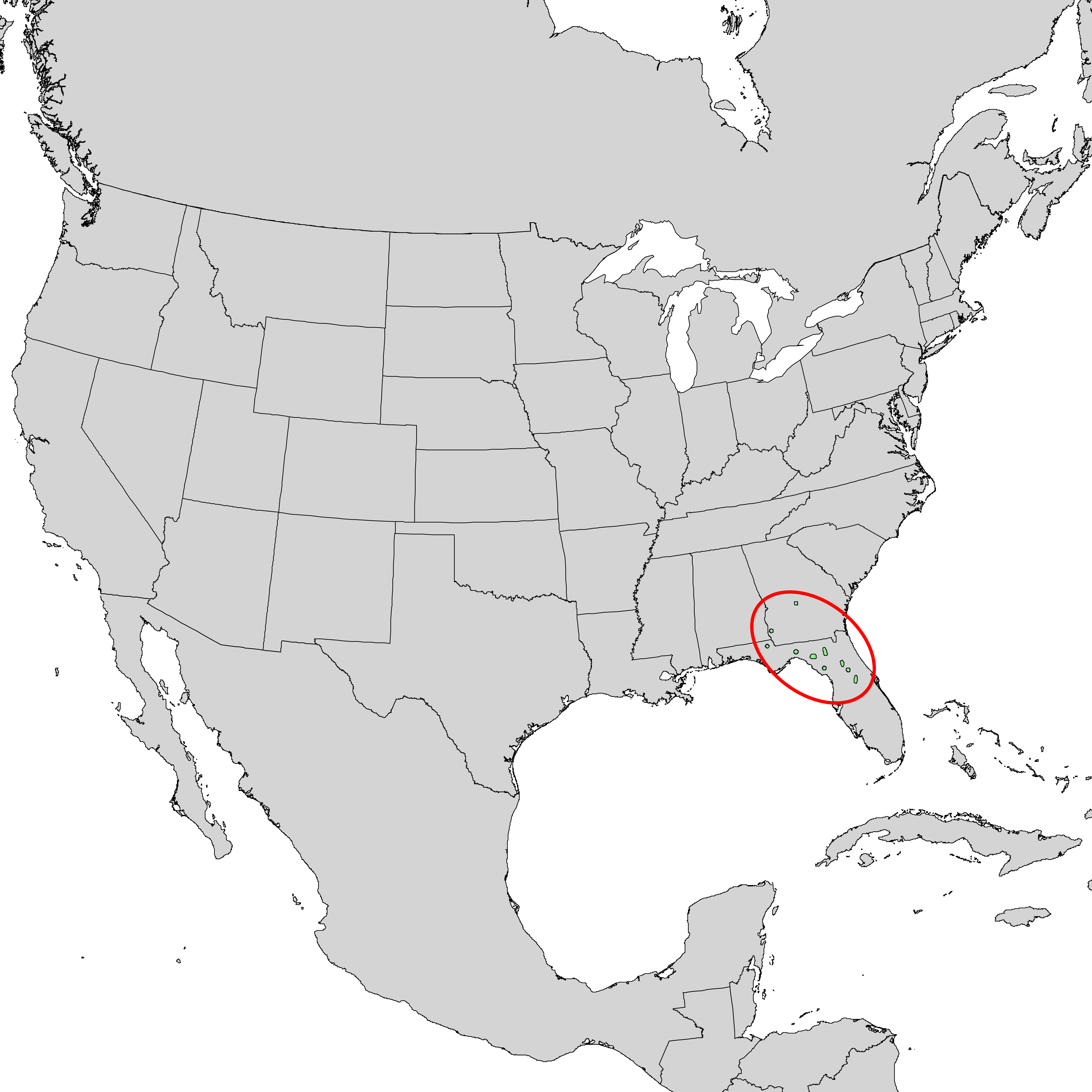
- Natural range of Salix floridana

= Salix floridana =

Species of willow

Salix floridana, the Florida willow, is a species of willow in the family Salicaceae. It is native to the southeastern United States in northern Florida and southwestern Georgia.

== Description ==
Salix floridana is a deciduous shrub or small tree growing to 6 m tall. The leaves are alternate, 5–15 cm long and 2–5 cm broad, with a very finely serrated margin; they are green above, and paler below with short whitish hairs.

The flowers are produced in catkins in early spring before the new leaves appear; it is dioecious, with male and female catkins on separate plants. The male catkins are 4–5.5 cm long; the female catkins are 5–7.5 cm long.

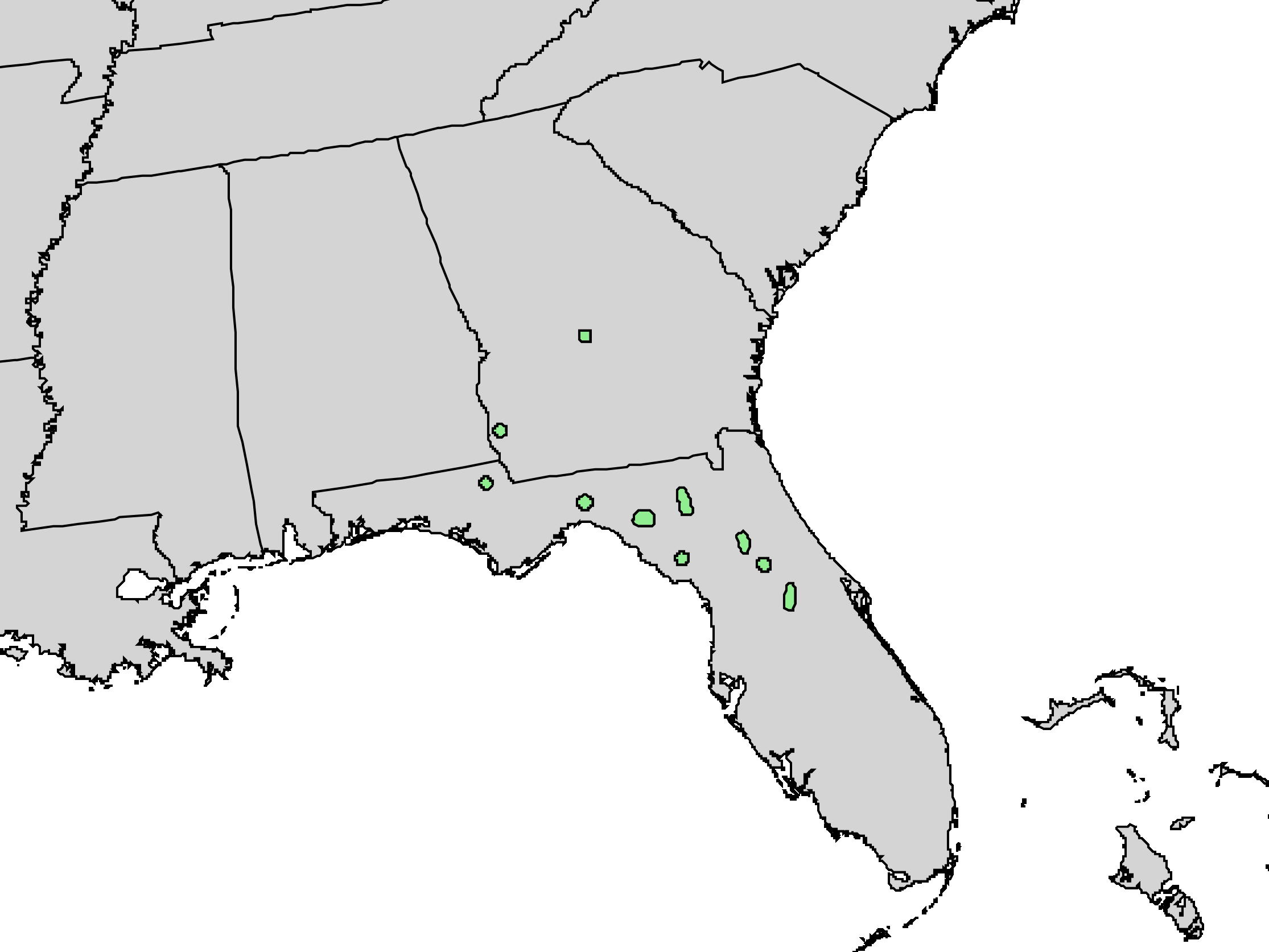
Natural range
