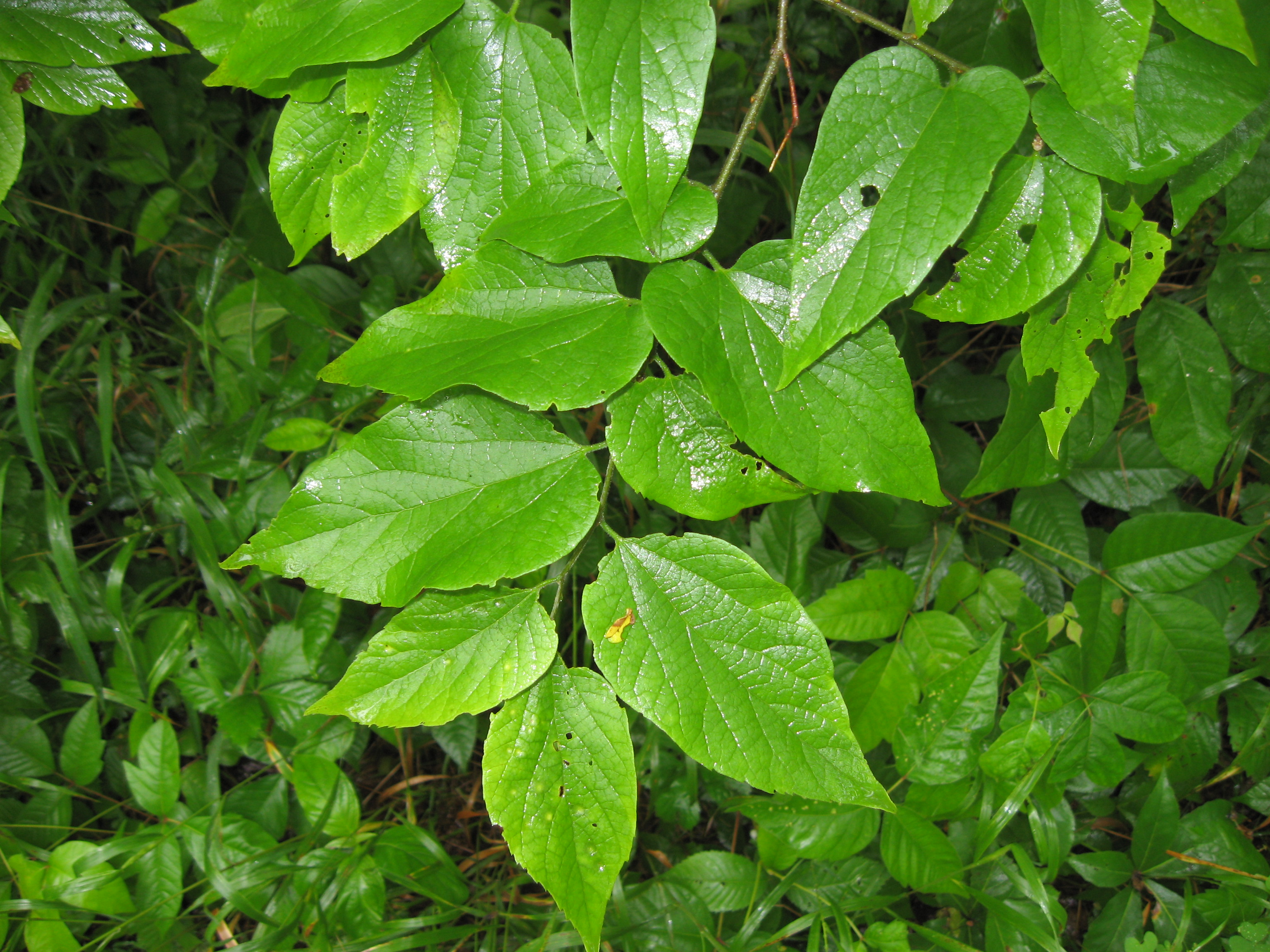
- C. tenuifolia leaves after a rain

Conservation status
- Secure (NatureServe)

Scientific classification
- Kingdom: Plantae
- Clade: Tracheophytes
- Clade: Angiosperms
- Clade: Eudicots
- Clade: Rosids
- Order: Rosales
- Family: Cannabaceae
- Genus: Celtis
- Species: C. tenuifolia

Binomial name
- Celtis tenuifolia Nutt.
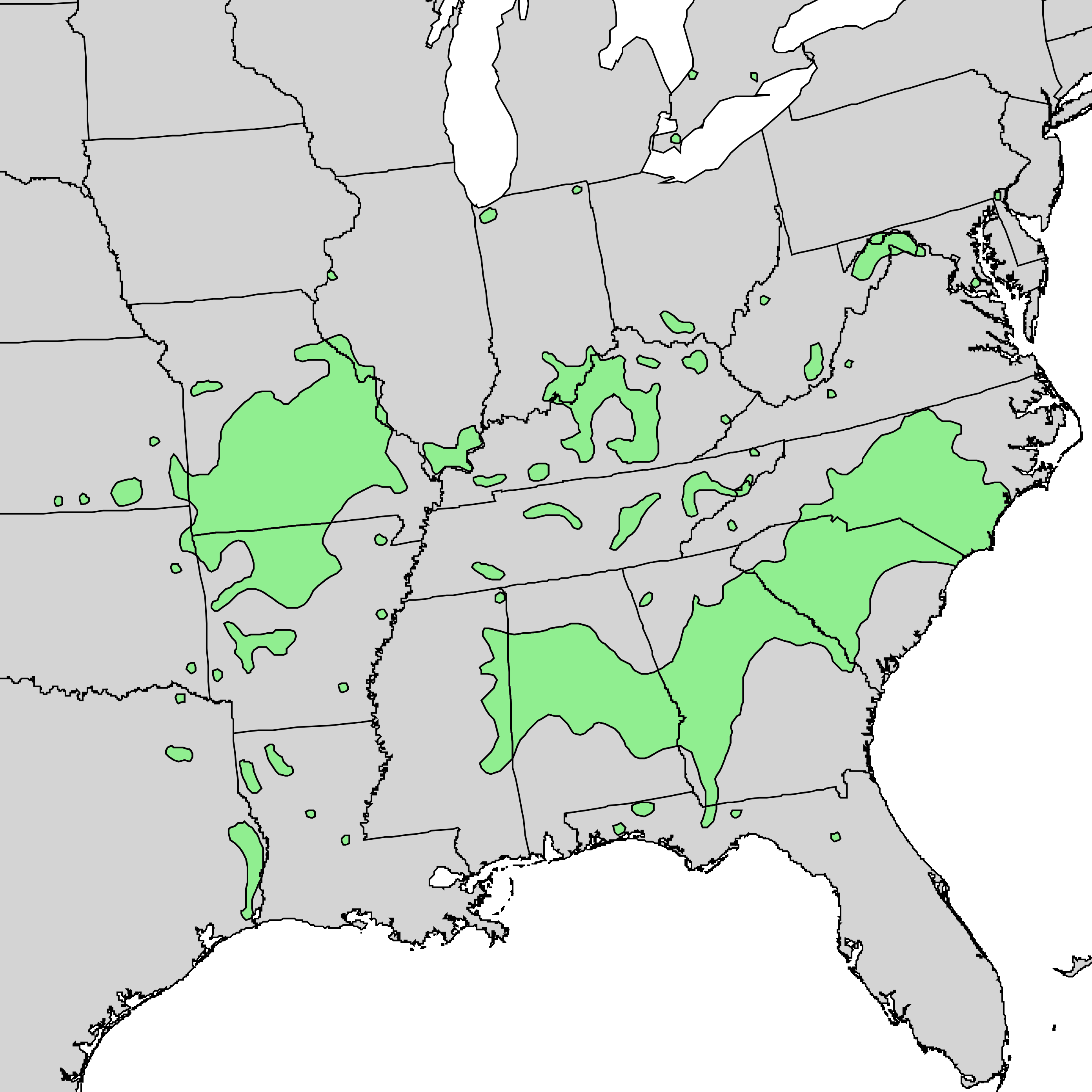
- Generalized natural range of Celtis tenuifolia

= Celtis tenuifolia =

Dwarf hackberry

Species of tree

Celtis tenuifolia, the dwarf hackberry or Georgia hackberry, is a shrub or small tree 2-to-12-meter-high (6.6 to 39.4 ft). It is native to eastern North America but is very uncommon north of the Ohio River. In Canada, dwarf hackberry is designated as threatened and protected under Canada's Species at Risk Act.

== Characteristics ==
The leaves are alternate, simple, blades 5–7 centimeters (2.0–2.8 in) long, and 2–3.5 centimeters (0.8–1.4 in) in width, shallowly toothed, and finely hairy. The winter buds are brown and hairy, similar to those of other hackberries, but smaller, only 1 to 2 mm. long. Terminal buds absent.

Plants are monecious with unisexual flowers, occurring either solitarily or in small clusters. This species is wind-pollinated and appears to be self-compatible.

The fruit is a berry-like drupe, 5 to 8 millimeters in diameter, consisting of a single stone encased within a thin, sweet mesocarp. From green, it becomes a light orange, then a dark red, then purplish-brown. This edible mesocarp is composed of a smooth outer crust and a pulpy yellow inside.

== Ecology and uses ==
Dwarf hackberry is shade intolerant, drought tolerant and slow-growing. It grows in dry upland habitats, including open woodlands, alvars, and sandy near-shore habitats. It is usually not found among other hackberries, although when other hackberry species occur in proximity to dwarf hackberry, intermediate forms may occur. Like other Celtis species, this species is a moderate calciphile, and is often found growing in thin soil over limestone.

Songbirds and other wildlife eat the fruit, likely playing a role in local dispersal.
