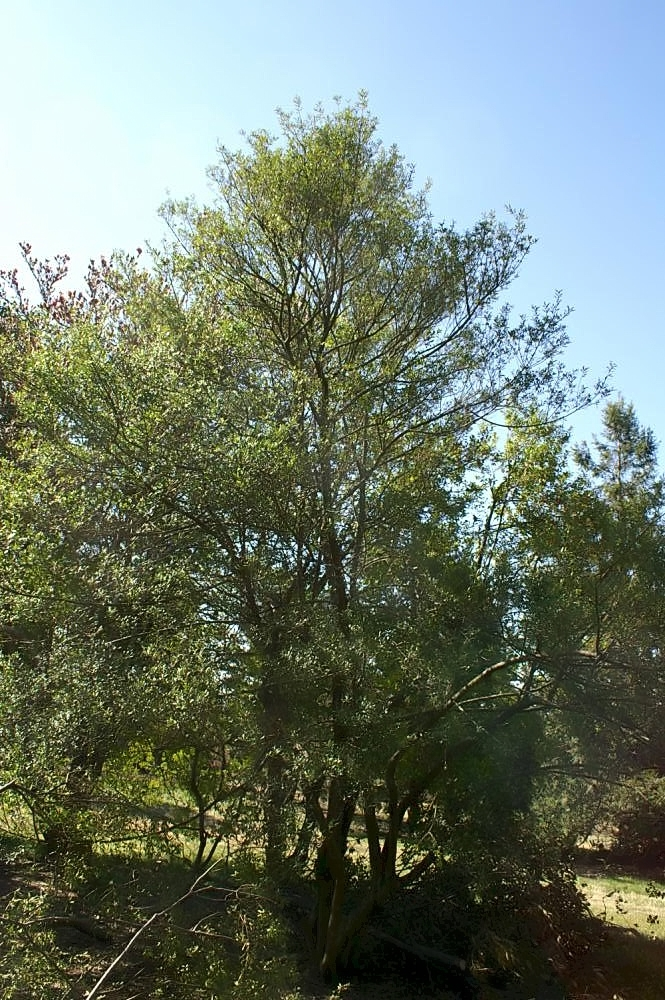

Conservation status
- Least Concern (IUCN 3.1)

Scientific classification
- Kingdom: Plantae
- Clade: Tracheophytes
- Clade: Angiosperms
- Clade: Eudicots
- Clade: Asterids
- Order: Aquifoliales
- Family: Aquifoliaceae
- Genus: Ilex
- Species: I. myrtifolia

Binomial name
- Ilex myrtifolia Walter

= Ilex myrtifolia =

Species of holly

Ilex myrtifolia, the myrtle dahoon or myrtle-leaved holly, is a species of holly native to the Southeastern United States.
