= Southern bayberry =

Southern bayberry is a common name for several plants and may refer to:

- Myrica caroliniensis, native to southeastern North America
- Myrica cerifera, native to North and Central America and the Caribbean
