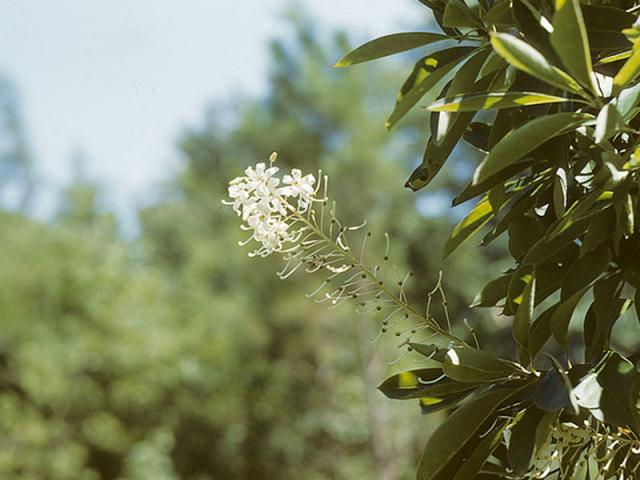

Conservation status
- Vulnerable (IUCN 3.1)

- Imperiled (NatureServe)

Scientific classification
- Kingdom: Plantae
- Clade: Embryophytes
- Clade: Tracheophytes
- Clade: Spermatophytes
- Clade: Angiosperms
- Clade: Eudicots
- Clade: Asterids
- Order: Ericales
- Family: Ericaceae
- Genus: Elliottia
- Species: E. racemosa

Binomial name
- Elliottia racemosa Muhl. ex Elliot
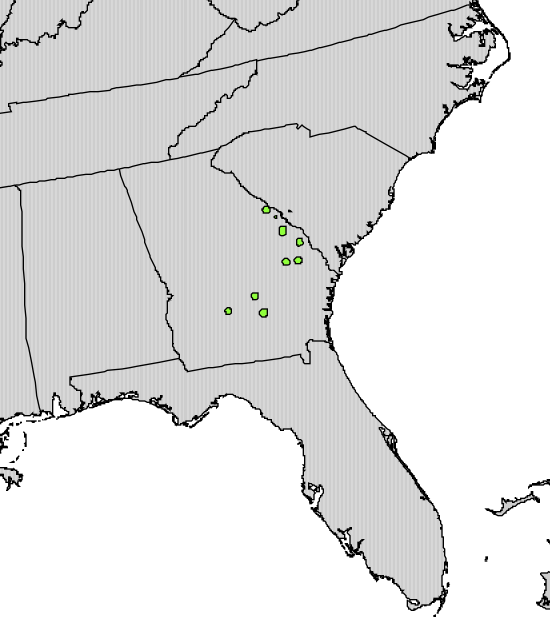

Synonyms
- Elliottia muhlea Steud.

= Elliottia racemosa =

Species of flowering plant

Elliottia racemosa, the Georgia plume or summer plume, is a plant in the family Ericaceae, and is endemic to the U.S. state of Georgia.

The plant is found in habitats of moist stream banks to dry ridges, and are usually in sandy soil. It is found at scattered locations in eastern and southern Georgia.

== Description ==
Elliottia racemosa is a rarely occurring species of shrub or sometimes small tree. The leaves are three to four inches long and one to two inches wide. It blooms with white flowers, with four petals. It produces a dry fruit.

The shrub was discovered and illustrated by William Bartram in 1775 and rediscovered in 1808 by the South Carolina botanist Stephen Elliott, who formally published a description in 1817. The species is listed as threatened.
