= Bladdernut =

Bladdernut is a common name for several plants and may refer to:

- Staphylea, genus of trees native to temperate regions of the Northern Hemisphere
- Diospyros whyteana, species of tree with edible fruit native to Africa
