= Alabama Champion Tree Program =

The Alabama Champion Tree Program is a listing of the largest known specimens of particular tree species, native or introduced, in the U.S. state of Alabama. It was established in 1970 by the Alabama Forestry Commission. The program was modeled on the National Register of Big Trees, started by the American Forests organization in 1940. The goal of Alabama's program is to record, heighten awareness of, and preserve the largest tree specimens in the state. It uses the same formula for recording tree specimens that was developed by American Forests. Former champions are removed from the list as new, larger, champions are identified and recorded. Although introduced species that have naturalized are generally eligible for the program, those species that the Alabama Invasive Plant Council considers to be invasive were removed from the listing in 2011 and are no longer eligible. With the addition of 20 new specimens in 2011, the program had a total of 159 Champion Trees listed.

== Listings ==
	Key
*	Introduced/non-native species
^{†}	National Champion Tree on National Register of Big Trees
^{‡}	Co-national Champion Tree on National Register of Big Trees

Common name	Species name	Year added	Trunk circumference	Height	Crown spread	County	Location / Visit
alder, hazel	Alnus serrulata	2001	19 in (48 cm)	25 ft (7.6 m)	29 ft (8.8 m)	Baldwin	
ash, green	Fraxinus pennsylvanica	2000	168 in (430 cm)	80 ft (24 m)	83 ft (25 m)	Wilcox	
ash, white	Fraxinus americana	2008	107 in (270 cm)	103 ft (31 m)	64 ft (20 m)	Wilcox	
basswood	Tilia spp.	2008	96 in (240 cm)	110 ft (34 m)	44 ft (13 m)	Monroe	
bayberry, scentless	Morella inodora	2000^{†}	15 in (38 cm)	27 ft (8.2 m)	16 ft (4.9 m)	Baldwin	
beech, American	Fagus grandifolia	2003	142 in (360 cm)	118 ft (36 m)	139 ft (42 m)	Autauga	
birch, sweet	Betula lenta	2008	53 in (130 cm)	53 ft (16 m)	36 ft (11 m)	DeKalb	
blackgum	Nyssa sylvatica	1988	128 in (330 cm)	108 ft (33 m)	49 ft (15 m)	Elmore	
buckeye, yellow	Aesculus flava	1994	86 in (220 cm)	125 ft (38 m)	54 ft (16 m)	Madison	
bumelia, buckthorn	Sideroxylon lycioides	2011	20 in (51 cm)	30 ft (9.1 m)	29 ft (8.8 m)	Lauderdale	
bumelia, gum	Sideroxylon lanuginosum	1994	51 in (130 cm)	45 ft (14 m)	34 ft (10 m)	Blount	
burningbush	Euonymus atropurpureus	2002	53 in (130 cm)	26 ft (7.9 m)	32 ft (9.8 m)	Baldwin	
butternut	Juglans cinerea	2011	103 in (260 cm)	60 ft (18 m)	67 ft (20 m)	Jackson	
catalpa, southern	Catalpa bignonioides	1994	202 in (510 cm)	58 ft (18 m)	67 ft (20 m)	Perry	
catalpa, southern	Catalpa bignonioides	2008	200 in (510 cm)	64 ft (20 m)	68 ft (21 m)	Clay	
cedar, Atlantic white	Chamaecyparis thyoides	2009	91 in (230 cm)	54 ft (16 m)	35 ft (11 m)	Baldwin	
cherry, Alabama black	Prunus alabamensis	2011	40 in (100 cm)	60 ft (18 m)	40 ft (12 m)	Tuscaloosa	
cherry, black	Prunus serotina	2009	140 in (360 cm)	71 ft (22 m)	79 ft (24 m)	Madison	
cherry, Carolina laurel	Prunus caroliniana	2008	14 in (36 cm)	37 ft (11 m)	44 ft (13 m)	Colbert	
chestnut, American	Castanea dentata	2009	35 in (89 cm)	58 ft (18 m)	32 ft (9.8 m)	Hale	
chestnut, Chinese	Castanea mollissima*	1998	138 in (350 cm)	65 ft (20 m)	77 ft (23 m)	Coosa	
chinquapin, Allegheny	Castanea pumila	2011	12 in (30 cm)	22 ft (6.7 m)	16 ft (4.9 m)	Winston	
cottonwood, eastern	Populus deltoides	2011	146 in (370 cm)	121 ft (37 m)	73 ft (22 m)	Chambers	
cottonwood, swamp	Populus heterophylla	2010	74 in (190 cm)	61 ft (19 m)	41 ft (12 m)	Baldwin	
crabapple, southern	Malus angustifolia	2002	59 in (150 cm)	39 ft (12 m)	27 ft (8.2 m)	Montgomery	
crape myrtle, common	Lagerstroemia indica*	2011	78 in (200 cm)	43 ft (13 m)	33 ft (10 m)	Wilcox	
crape myrtle, common	Lagerstroemia indica*	2008	78 in (200 cm)	40 ft (12 m)	38 ft (12 m)	Shelby	
cypress, bald	Taxodium distichum	1989	326 in (830 cm)	112 ft (34 m)	56 ft (17 m)	Baldwin	Via watercraft only. Tours Available
cypress, pond	Taxodium ascendens	2010	90 in (230 cm)	97 ft (30 m)	42 ft (13 m)	Baldwin	
cyrilla, swamp	Cyrilla racemiflora	1996	42 in (110 cm)	45 ft (14 m)	38 ft (12 m)	Mobile	
devilwood	Osmanthus americanus	2001	24 in (61 cm)	36 ft (11 m)	25 ft (7.6 m)	Baldwin	
dogwood, flowering	Cornus florida	2009	70 in (180 cm)	38 ft (12 m)	53 ft (16 m)	Cleburne	
elm, American	Ulmus americana	2008	185 in (470 cm)	97 ft (30 m)	82 ft (25 m)	Walker	
elm, September	Ulmus serotina	2011	59 in (150 cm)	94 ft (29 m)	49 ft (15 m)	Lauderdale	
elm, Siberian	Ulmus pumila*	1982	61 in (150 cm)	48 ft (15 m)	49 ft (15 m)	Madison	
elm, slippery	Ulmus rubra	2011	163 in (410 cm)	54 ft (16 m)	80 ft (24 m)	Cullman	
elm, water	Planera aquatica	1982	58 in (150 cm)	51 ft (16 m)	55 ft (17 m)	Covington	
elm, winged	Ulmus alata	1997	130 in (330 cm)	75 ft (23 m)	70 ft (21 m)	Wilcox	
fringetree, white	Chionanthus virginicus	2010	29 in (74 cm)	18 ft (5.5 m)	31 ft (9.4 m)	Tuscaloosa	
hackberry, common	Celtis occidentalis	2009	176 in (450 cm)	67 ft (20 m)	93 ft (28 m)	Marshall	
hackberry, Georgia	Celtis tenuifolia	2007^{‡}	37 in (94 cm)	54 ft (16 m)	31 ft (9.4 m)	Perry	
hawthorn, dotted	Crataegus punctata	1994	13 in (33 cm)	26 ft (7.9 m)	18 ft (5.5 m)	Madison	
hawthorn, littlehip	Crataegus spathulata	2009	14 in (36 cm)	21 ft (6.4 m)	18 ft (5.5 m)	DeKalb	
hemlock, eastern	Tsuga canadensis	1992	157 in (400 cm)	130 ft (40 m)	44 ft (13 m)	Winston	
Hercules-club	Zanthoxylum clava-herculis	2007	43 in (110 cm)	43 ft (13 m)	33 ft (10 m)	Dallas	
Hercules-club	Zanthoxylum clava-herculis	2005	30 in (76 cm)	59 ft (18 m)	29 ft (8.8 m)	Baldwin	
hickory, bitternut	Carya cordiformis	2011	68 in (170 cm)	82 ft (25 m)	46 ft (14 m)	Lauderdale	
hickory, mockernut	Carya tomentosa	2008	100 in (250 cm)	97 ft (30 m)	86 ft (26 m)	Jackson	
hickory, nutmeg	Carya myristiciformis	2009	69 in (180 cm)	89 ft (27 m)	38 ft (12 m)	Dallas	
hickory, pignut	Carya glabra	1992	155 in (390 cm)	110 ft (34 m)	76 ft (23 m)	Clarke	
hickory, red	Carya ovalis	2004	36 in (91 cm)	85 ft (26 m)	38 ft (12 m)	Perry	
hickory, sand	Carya pallida	2010	85 in (220 cm)	76 ft (23 m)	23 ft (7.0 m)	Cherokee	
hickory, shagbark	Carya ovata	2008	92 in (230 cm)	119 ft (36 m)	67 ft (20 m)	Etowah	
hickory, shellbark	Carya laciniosa	2007	102 in (260 cm)	112 ft (34 m)	90 ft (27 m)	Madison	
hickory, water	Carya aquatica	2001	152 in (390 cm)	136 ft (41 m)	78 ft (24 m)	Baldwin	
holly, American	Ilex opaca	1987	126 in (320 cm)	50 ft (15 m)	47 ft (14 m)	Chambers	
holly, dahoon	Ilex cassine	2007	38 in (97 cm)	47 ft (14 m)	37 ft (11 m)	Baldwin	
hophornbeam, eastern	Ostrya virginiana	2008	37 in (94 cm)	55 ft (17 m)	39 ft (12 m)	DeKalb	
hoptree	Ptelea trifoliata	2011	15 in (38 cm)	16 ft (4.9 m)	17 ft (5.2 m)	Jackson	
hornbeam, American	Carpinus caroliniana	2011	31 in (79 cm)	56 ft (17 m)	38 ft (12 m)	Bibb	
hornbeam, American	Carpinus caroliniana	2008	41 in (100 cm)	46 ft (14 m)	37 ft (11 m)	Baldwin	
locust, black	Robinia pseudoacacia	1995	95 in (240 cm)	102 ft (31 m)	27 ft (8.2 m)	Madison	
locust, honey	Gleditsia triacanthos	2009	90 in (230 cm)	107 ft (33 m)	67 ft (20 m)	Talladega	
magnolia, bigleaf	Magnolia macrophylla	2008	60 in (150 cm)	85 ft (26 m)	44 ft (13 m)	Monroe	
magnolia, cucumber	Magnolia acuminata	1993	136 in (350 cm)	112 ft (34 m)	59 ft (18 m)	Madison	
magnolia, pyramid	Magnolia pyramidata	2011	41 in (100 cm)	92 ft (28 m)	24 ft (7.3 m)	Wilcox	
magnolia, southern	Magnolia grandiflora	1987	190 in (480 cm)	75 ft (23 m)	71 ft (22 m)	Calhoun	
magnolia, sweetbay	Magnolia virginiana	2010	140 in (360 cm)	91 ft (28 m)	63 ft (19 m)	Baldwin	
magnolia, umbrella	Magnolia tripetala	2011	27 in (69 cm)	45 ft (14 m)	20 ft (6.1 m)	Calhoun	
maple, ashleaf	Acer negundo	2011	150 in (380 cm)	60 ft (18 m)	17 ft (5.2 m)	Jackson	
maple, chalk	Acer leucoderme	2008	43 in (110 cm)	51 ft (16 m)	36 ft (11 m)	Wilcox	
maple, Florida	Acer floridanum	2010	80 in (200 cm)	82 ft (25 m)	32 ft (9.8 m)	Lowndes	
maple, red	Acer rubrum	2009	131 in (330 cm)	87 ft (27 m)	67 ft (20 m)	Morgan	
maple, sugar	Acer saccharum	2008	130 in (330 cm)	80 ft (24 m)	64 ft (20 m)	Madison	
mayhaw	Crataegus aestivalis	2007	20 in (51 cm)	20 ft (6.1 m)	22 ft (6.7 m)	Baldwin	
mulberry, red	Morus rubra	2009	254 in (650 cm)	60 ft (18 m)	50 ft (15 m)	Choctaw	
mulberry, white	Morus alba*	2007	195 in (500 cm)	38 ft (12 m)	53 ft (16 m)	DeKalb	
oak, Arkansas	Quercus arkansana	1991	43 in (110 cm)	55 ft (17 m)	39 ft (12 m)	Autauga	
oak, black	Quercus velutina	1992	242 in (610 cm)	80 ft (24 m)	94 ft (29 m)	Macon	
oak, blackjack	Quercus marilandica	1997	121 in (310 cm)	72 ft (22 m)	49 ft (15 m)	Barbour	
oak, bluejack	Quercus incana	1994	65 in (170 cm)	53 ft (16 m)	27 ft (8.2 m)	Chilton	
oak, bluff	Quercus austrina	200	96 in (240 cm)	92 ft (28 m)	47 ft (14 m)	Baldwin	
oak, bur	Quercus macrocarpa	1990	116 in (290 cm)	59 ft (18 m)	75 ft (23 m)	Montgomery	
oak, cherrybark	Quercus pagoda	1999	248 in (630 cm)	115 ft (35 m)	144 ft (44 m)	Bibb	
oak, chinkapin	Quercus muehlenbergii	2011	136 in (350 cm)	133 ft (41 m)	82 ft (25 m)	Lauderdale	
oak, darlington	Quercus hemisphaerica	2009	243 in (620 cm)	95 ft (29 m)	102 ft (31 m)	Hale	
oak, Durand	Quercus sinuata var. sinuata	2020^{†}	180 in (460 cm)	90 ft (27 m)	95 ft (29 m)	Greene	
oak, laurel	Quercus laurifolia	2010	285 in (720 cm)	95 ft (29 m)	127 ft (39 m)	Marengo	
oak, live	Quercus virginiana	2013	363 in (920 cm)	82 ft (25 m)	136 ft (41 m)	Mobile	Intersection of Highway 43 & Dead Lake Road
oak, myrtle	Quercus myrtifolia	2007^{‡}	26 in (66 cm)	35 ft (11 m)	30 ft (9.1 m)	Baldwin	
oak, northern red	Quercus rubra	2009	127 in (320 cm)	125 ft (38 m)	93 ft (28 m)	Marion	
oak, nuttall	Quercus texana	2000	178 in (450 cm)	114 ft (35 m)	102 ft (31 m)	Madison	
oak, overcup	Quercus lyrata	1984	247 in (630 cm)	139 ft (42 m)	109 ft (33 m)	Marengo	
oak, post	Quercus stellata	2010	195 in (500 cm)	88 ft (27 m)	79 ft (24 m)	Montgomery	
oak, post	Quercus stellata	2010	194 in (490 cm)	86 ft (26 m)	84 ft (26 m)	Coosa	
oak, sand live	Quercus geminata	1998	185 in (470 cm)	56 ft (17 m)	104 ft (32 m)	Mobile	
oak, sand post	Quercus margaretta	1982	106 in (270 cm)	68 ft (21 m)	83 ft (25 m)	Covington	
oak, sawtooth	Quercus acutissima*	1997	90 in (230 cm)	101 ft (31 m)	97 ft (30 m)	Barbour	
oak, scarlet	Quercus coccinea	2011	168 in (430 cm)	115 ft (35 m)	94 ft (29 m)	Jackson	
oak, shingle	Quercus imbricaria	2004	152 in (390 cm)	68 ft (21 m)	102 ft (31 m)	Lawrence	
oak, shumard	Quercus shumardii	2008	234 in (590 cm)	90 ft (27 m)	117 ft (36 m)	Bullock	
oak, southern red	Quercus falcata	1987	329 in (840 cm)	73 ft (22 m)	106 ft (32 m)	Pike	
oak, swamp chestnut	Quercus michauxii	2007	280 in (710 cm)	120 ft (37 m)	113 ft (34 m)	Cleburne	
oak, swamp white oak	Quercus bicolor	2007	119 in (300 cm)	90 ft (27 m)	30 ft (9.1 m)	Madison	
oak, white	Quercus alba	2003	210 in (530 cm)	100 ft (30 m)	110 ft (34 m)	Montgomery	
oak, willow	Quercus phellos	2004	251 in (640 cm)	68 ft (21 m)	86 ft (26 m)	Marshall	
osage-orange	Maclura pomifera	1990	284 in (720 cm)	88 ft (27 m)	67 ft (20 m)	Greene	
pawpaw, common	Asimina triloba	1997	31 in (79 cm)	55 ft (17 m)	10 ft (3.0 m)	Randolph	
pear, European	Pyrus communis*	2003	77 in (200 cm)	57 ft (17 m)	40 ft (12 m)	Chilton	
pecan	Carya illinoinensis	1999	228 in (580 cm)	118 ft (36 m)	134 ft (41 m)	Conecuh	
persimmon, American	Diospyros virginiana	2003	80 in (200 cm)	122 ft (37 m)	47 ft (14 m)	Lauderdale	
pine, loblolly	Pinus taeda	1998	169 in (430 cm)	134 ft (41 m)	91 ft (28 m)	Bullock	
pine, pond	Pinus serotina	2000	98 in (250 cm)	128 ft (39 m)	45 ft (14 m)	Barbour	
pine, sand	Pinus clausa	2008	60 in (150 cm)	45 ft (14 m)	33 ft (10 m)	Baldwin	
pine, shortleaf	Pinus echinata	2008	129 in (330 cm)	91 ft (28 m)	56 ft (17 m)	Madison	
pine, slash	Pinus elliottii	2010	95 in (240 cm)	72 ft (22 m)	49 ft (15 m)	Baldwin	
pine, spruce	Pinus glabra	1996	147 in (370 cm)	125 ft (38 m)	86 ft (26 m)	Russell	
pine, Virginia	Pinus virginiana	2009	71 in (180 cm)	93 ft (28 m)	31 ft (9.4 m)	DeKalb	
plum, American	Prunus americana	2007	26 in (66 cm)	19 ft (5.8 m)	22 ft (6.7 m)	Elmore	
plum, Chickasaw	Prunus angustifolia	2007	19 in (48 cm)	17 ft (5.2 m)	19 ft (5.8 m)	Baldwin	
plum, flatwoods	Prunus umbellata	2010	20 in (51 cm)	22 ft (6.7 m)	25 ft (7.6 m)	Baldwin	
privet, eastern swamp	Forestiera acuminata	1995	19 in (48 cm)	36 ft (11 m)	24 ft (7.3 m)	Madison	
redbud, eastern	Cercis canadensis	2000	86 in (220 cm)	36 ft (11 m)	34 ft (10 m)	Limestone	
red-cedar, eastern	Juniperus virginiana	1979	169 in (430 cm)	51 ft (16 m)	30 ft (9.1 m)	Wilcox	
red-cedar, southern	Juniperus silicicola	2001	167 in (420 cm)	50 ft (15 m)	45 ft (14 m)	Baldwin	
sassafras	Sassafras albidum	1992	140 in (360 cm)	67 ft (20 m)	36 ft (11 m)	Dallas	
serviceberry, downy	Amelanchier arborea	2009	24 in (61 cm)	40 ft (12 m)	18 ft (5.5 m)	DeKalb	
silverbell, Carolina	Halesia carolina	2011	42 in (110 cm)	63 ft (19 m)	39 ft (12 m)	Randolph	
silverbell, two-winged	Halesia diptera	1998^{†}	40 in (100 cm)	78 ft (24 m)	33 ft (10 m)	Wilcox	
smoketree, American	Cotinus obovatus	2010	58 in (150 cm)	64 ft (20 m)	37 ft (11 m)	Madison	
sourwood	Oxydendrum arboreum	2009	65 in (170 cm)	87 ft (27 m)	39 ft (12 m)	Marion	
sparkleberry	Vaccinium arboreum	2007^{‡}	47 in (120 cm)	28 ft (8.5 m)	41 ft (12 m)	Choctaw	
sugarberry	Celtis laevigata	1994^{†}	221 in (560 cm)	82 ft (25 m)	36 ft (11 m)	Barbour	
sumac, smooth	Rhus glabra	2011	12 in (30 cm)	21 ft (6.4 m)	11 ft (3.4 m)	Jackson	
sweetgum, American	Liquidambar styraciflua	1990	161 in (410 cm)	75 ft (23 m)	66 ft (20 m)	Coosa	
sweetgum, American	Liquidambar styraciflua	2011	135 in (340 cm)	95 ft (29 m)	86 ft (26 m)	Montgomery	
sweetleaf	Symplocos tinctoria	2009	25 in (64 cm)	63 ft (19 m)	20 ft (6.1 m)	Marion	
sycamore, American	Platanus occidentalis	2010	182 in (460 cm)	115 ft (35 m)	102 ft (31 m)	Montgomery	
tulip tree	Liriodendron tulipifera	1974	252 in (640 cm)	153 ft (47 m)	73 ft (22 m)	Lawrence	
tupelo, water	Nyssa aquatica	2007	237 in (600 cm)	112 ft (34 m)	88 ft (27 m)	Madison	
walnut, eastern black	Juglans nigra	1973	199 in (510 cm)	76 ft (23 m)	97 ft (30 m)	Colbert	
willow, black	Salix nigra	2009	144 in (370 cm)	74 ft (23 m)	66 ft (20 m)	Perry	
yellowwood, American	Cladrastis kentukea	2010	28 in (71 cm)	48 ft (15 m)	28 ft (8.5 m)	Jackson	
