= Donald E. Davis Arboretum =

Public garden in Alabama, U.S.

The Donald E. Davis Arboretum
- A Living Museum of Southeastern Native Plants
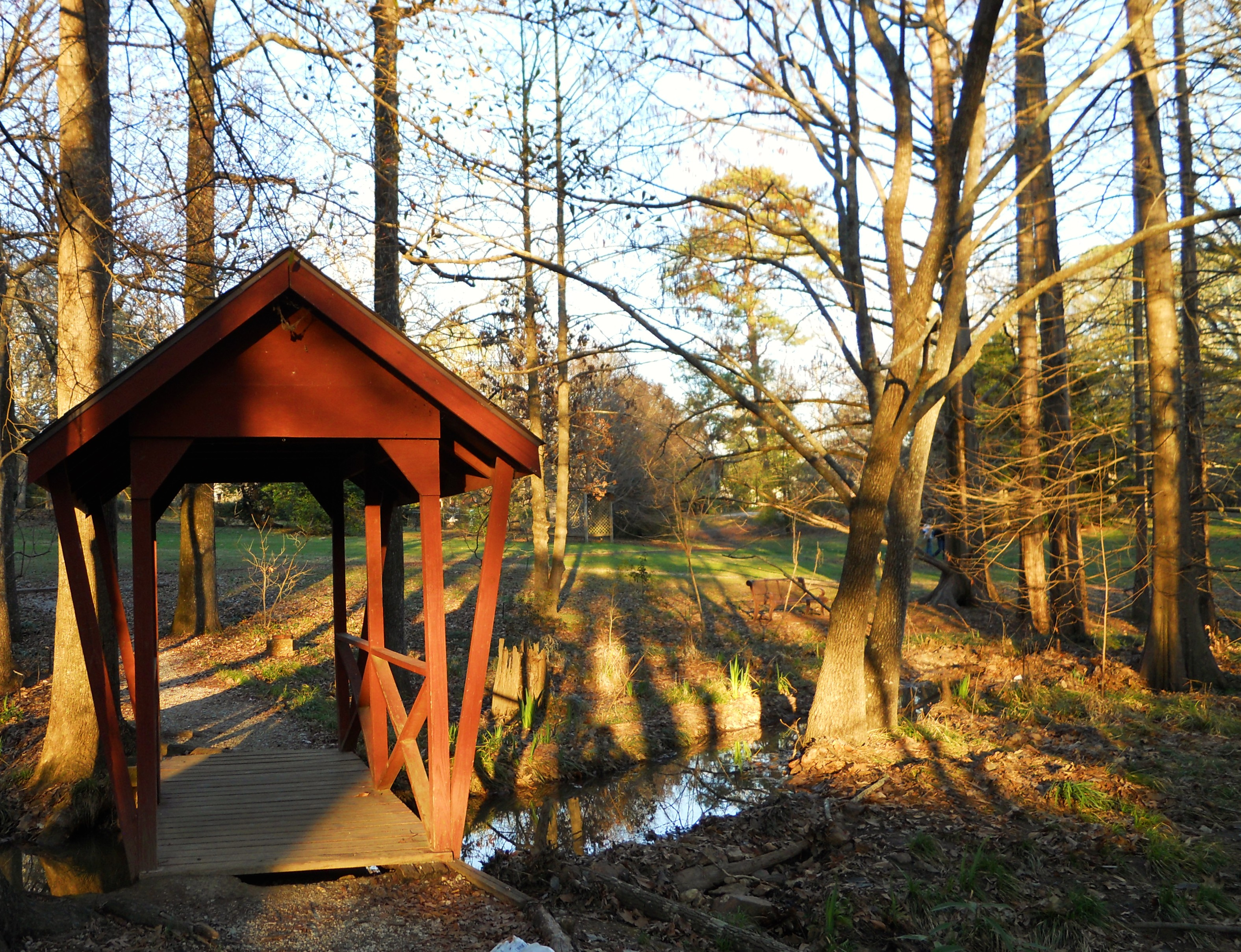
- A bridge at Davis Arboretum (2011)

- Location within Alabama Location within the United States
- Type: Arboretum
- Motto: Promoting Education, Research, and Outreach
- Location: 181 Garden Drive Auburn, Alabama 36830
- Coordinates: 32°35′44″N 85°28′58″W
- Area: 13.5 acres (5.5 ha)
- Established: 1963
- Founder: Dr. Donald E. Davis
- Owner: Auburn University
- Administrator: Morgan Beadles, School of Biological Sciences
- Operator: Patrick Thompson and Terri Briggs
- Open: 365 days a year
- Awards: Eagle Award, Five Star and Urban Waters Restoration grant
- Paths: 1.2 miles (2km)
- Water: pond and stream
- Plants: Native
- Collections: Rhodadendron And Azalea Collection, Southeastern Oaks Collection, George's Trillium Garden, Carnivorous Pitcher Bog
- Facilities: Main Pavilion, Outdoor class rooms, Nursery
- Website: www.auburn.edu/cosam/arboretum/index.htm

The Donald E. Davis Arboretum, in Auburn, Alabama, United States, is a public native plants museum, and botanical arboretum with educational facilities, event spaces, and a conservation program. Its grounds, covering 13.5 acres (4.5 hectares) of Auburn University's campus, include cataloged living collections of associated tree and plant communities representative of Alabama's ecosystems, among which is mixed oak forest, carnivorous bog, and longleaf pine savanna. The living collections include more than 1,000 plant types, including 500 different plant species, with over 3,000 cataloged specimens. The Arboretum contains over a mile (2 km) of interwoven walking trails that meander through various southeastern biotopes.

The arboretum's Rhododendron and Azalea Collection is one of the more extensive native azalea collections in the nation and the nationally accredited Oaks Collection contains over 40 regional Quercus species. The arboretum partners in a number of conservation projects through the Alabama Plant Conservation Alliance (APCA) hosted by Auburn University and largely coordinated by the arboretum.

== History and mission ==
In 1959, by the proposal of Prof. Donald E. Davis, the Auburn University School of Agriculture passed a resolution asking that a plot of land located immediately south of the university president's home be used as an arboretum for Alabama's native trees. The plot, which was just north of the Old Rotation, contained forest, wetland, and pasture. Davis began surveying and working the Arboretum after its approval in 1963. In 1977 the Arboretum was dedicated in his name. The mission of the Arboretum was established "to display and preserve living plant collections and native southeastern plant communities; to inspire an understanding of the natural world and our connection to it; and to promote education, research, conservation, and outreach."

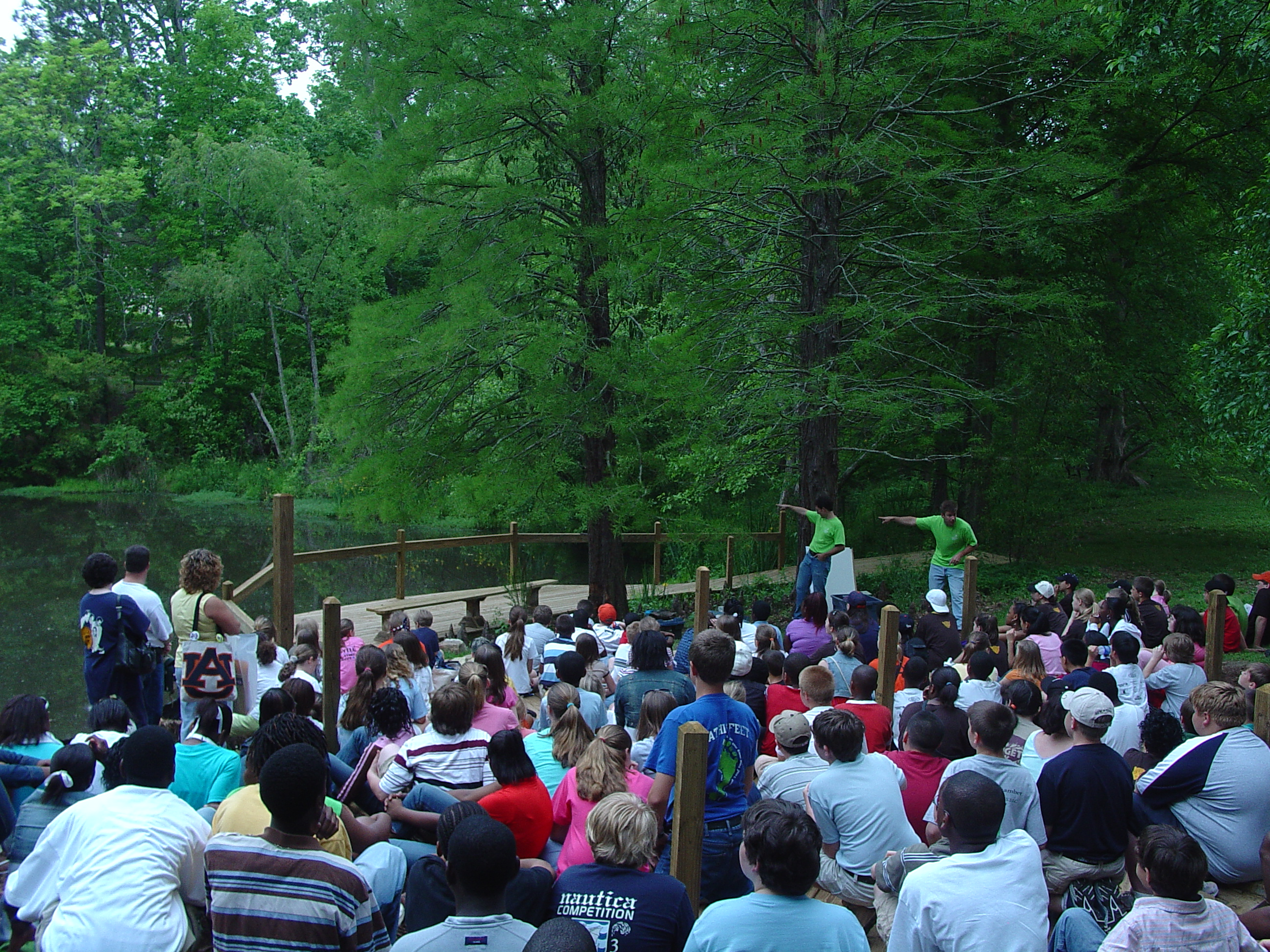
Outdoor classroom by the Cypress dome

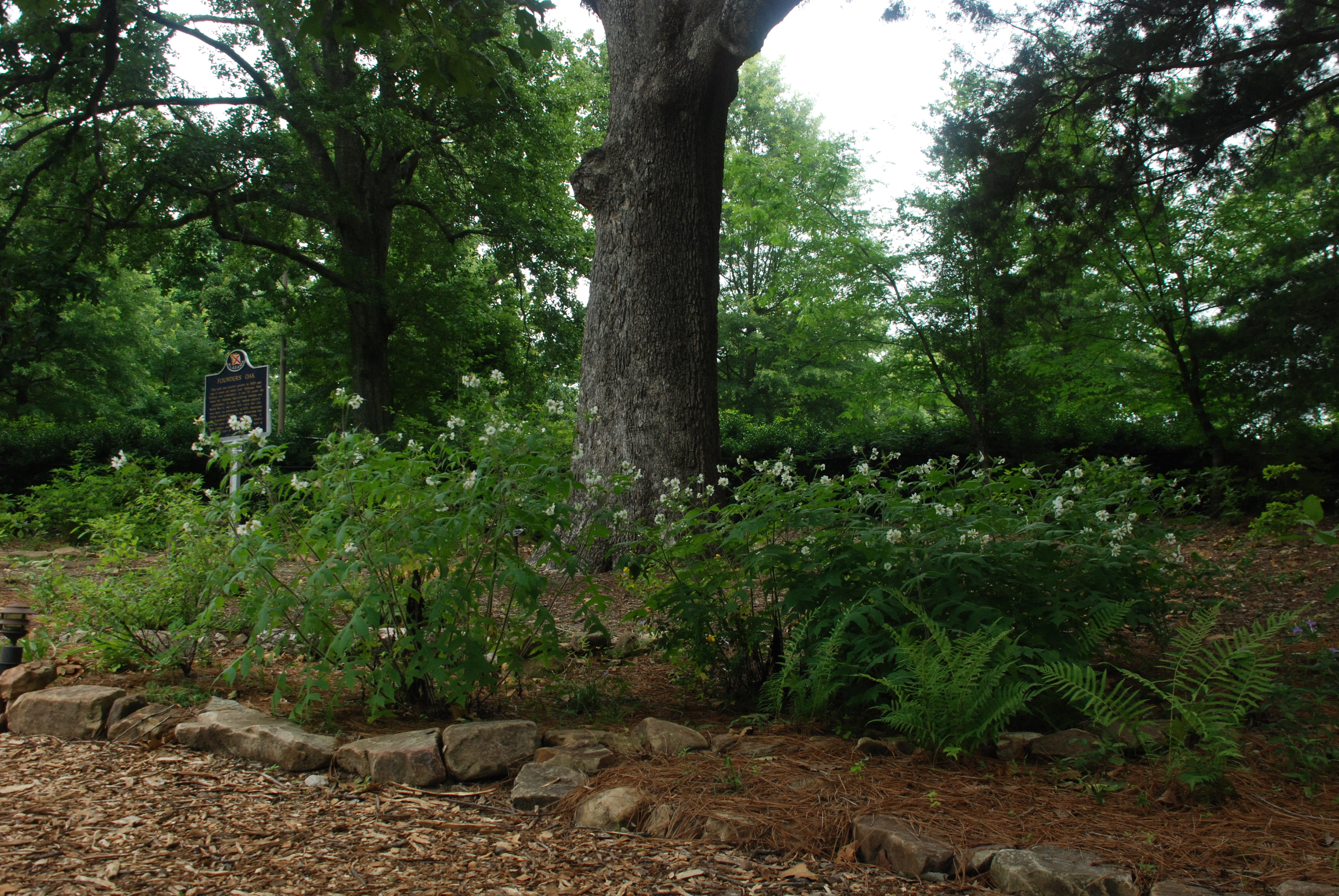
Auburn Founders Oak

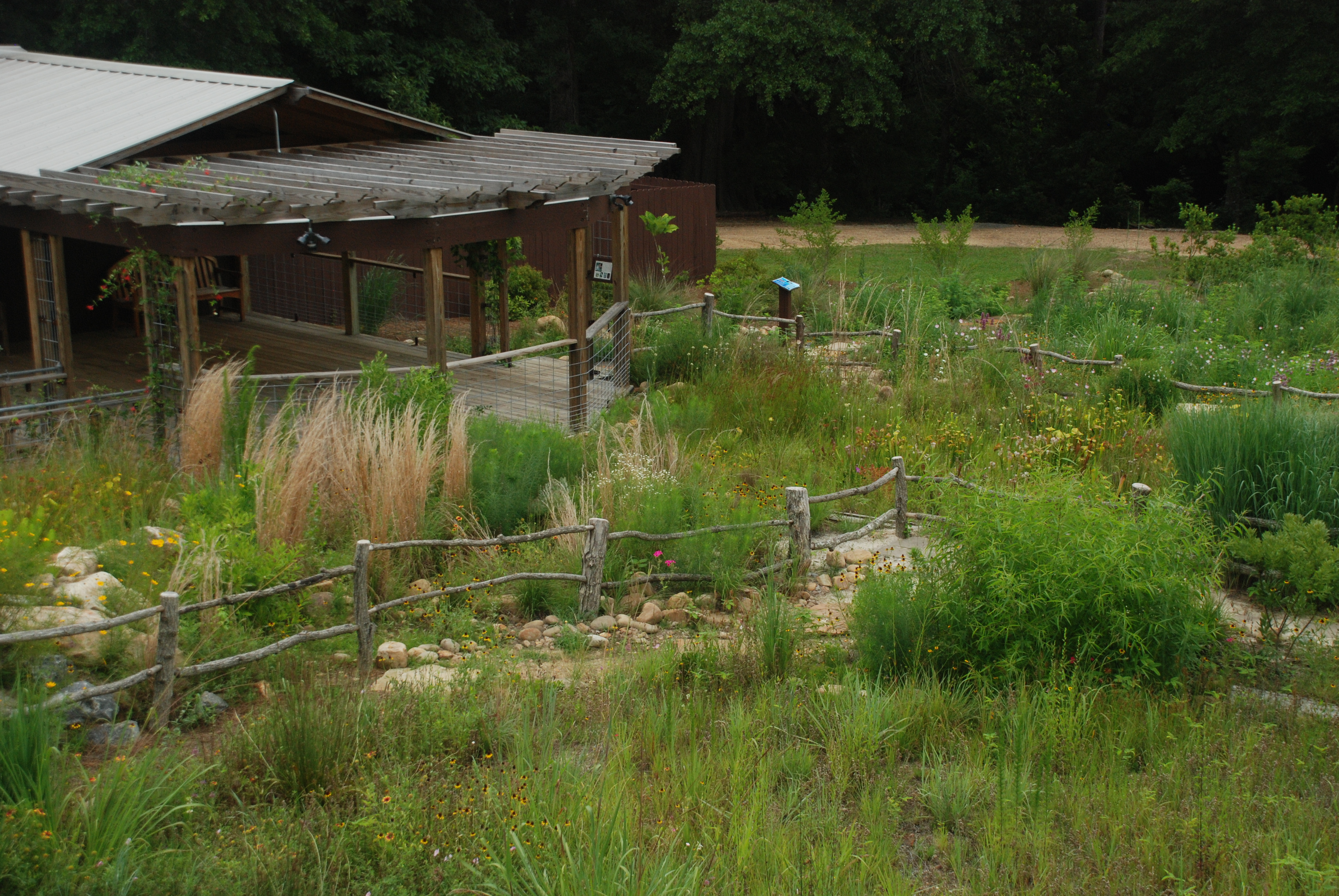
Outdoor classroom by the Upland Carnivorous Bog

At the turn of the century, the Auburn Forestry department worked with the arboretum to document 900 tree specimens on campus and the arboretum's plant accessions database was built to facilitate an acorn collecting program to track the provenance of its specimens. In 2002, Natureserve published a report showing that Alabama was among the most biologically diverse states in the nation. This is in part because of the state's intersection of many physiogeographic regions creating ranges of species overlap. Unfortunately, the state was also found to have the most extinctions in the continental US. In light of this, staff and faculty from Auburn's School of Biological Sciences were invited to a meeting of the Georgia Plant Conservation Alliance, and it was agreed that they would establish and host The Alabama Plant Conservation Alliance. The Arboretum staff and special collections curator, Patrick Thompson, began participating with state and federal conservation departments, private land owners, as well as other universities, and gardens in the statewide conservation program.

== Conservation and collections ==
Along with working on in situ conservation projects throughout the state, the APCA starts ex situ populations with the aid of the arboretum's propagation program. The native plants nursery tracks accession provenance as well as participates in genomic ecotype studies with about 20 institutions. The Arboretum is also home to the only university plant collection accredited by the APGA’s Plant Collections Network in the SEC. It has one of two nationally accredited plant genera collections in the state of Alabama, the other being Huntsville Botanical Gardens Trillium collection.

=== Rhododendron ===
The Rhododendron collection is world-renowned, containing 60 varieties of Rhododendron and Azalea including its own Auburn Azalea Series of hybrids. During their period of bloom, the Arboretum is host to the Auburn Azalea Festival.

=== Quercus ===
The arboretum's conservation program has participated in The Tree Gene Conservation projects with APGA and the USDA Forest Service for four oak species including the rare Quercus boyntonii. Its oak collection contains all 39 of Alabama's oak species plus two more from Tennessee and Arkansas. The collection includes Auburn University's Founders Oak (Quercus stellata), which became the most prized tree on AU campus, after the 2010 Iron Bowl arboricidal rampage on the ceremonious live oaks across from Toomer's Corner. The Founders Oak, considered the "heart of the Davis Arboretum", was planted in 1850, six years before the founding of what is now called Auburn University.

=== Carnivorous plants ===
The arboretum's Carnivorous Bog contains species from all carnivorous genera of the Deep South, Sarracenia (19 sp.), Drosera (3 sp.), Dionaea, Utricularia, and Pinguicula.

=== APCA projects ===
After 2014, the Arboretum partnered with APCA members conserving populations of endangered species from the Cahaba Ketona glade such as Xyris spathifoli. Other statewide APCA projects include the restoration of Harper's ginger (Hexastylis speciosa), Eastern turkeybeard, Pondberry, Giant whorled sunflower (Helianthus verticillatus), Green Pitcher Plant (Sarracenia oreophila), Alabama Canebrake Pitcher Plant (Sarracenia alabamensis), and various species in the 480 acre Haines Island Park on the Alabama River.

=== Other notable species ===
Some notable species in the arboretum's collection include:

A

- Abies firma
- Acer floridanum
- Acer leucoderme
- Acer negundo
- Acer palmatum
- Acer rubrum
- Acer saccharinum
- Acer saccharum
- Aesculus flava
- Aesculus parviflora
- Aesculus pavia
- Aesculus sylvatica
- Agarista populifolia
- Ailanthus altissima
- Albizia julibrissin
- Alnus serrulata
- Amelanchier arborea
- Amelanchier laevis
- Ampelopsis arborea
- Aralia spinosa
- Aronia arbutifolia
- Asimina parviflora
- Asimina triloba

B

- Baccharis halimifolia
- Befaria racemosa
- Berchemia scandens
- Betula nigra
- Bignonia capreolata
- Broussonetia papyrifera

C

- Callicarpa americana
- Calycanthus floridus
- Campsis radicans
- Carpinus caroliniana
- Carya aquatica
- Carya cordiformis
- Carya glabra
- Carya illinoensis
- Carya laciniosa
- Carya myristicaeformis
- Carya ovalis
- Carya ovata
- Carya pallida
- Carya tomentosa
- Catalpa bignonioides
- Cedrus deodara
- Celtis laevigata
- Celtis occidentalis
- Celtis tenuifolia
- Cephalanthus occidentalis
- Cercis canadensis
- Cercis chinensis
- Chamaecyparis thyoides
- Chionanthus retusus
- Chionanthus virginicus
- Clematis
- Clethra alnifolia
- Cliftonia monophylla
- Cocculus carolinus
- Conradina canescens
- Cornus alternifolia
- Cornus amomum
- Cornus florida
- Corylus americana
- Cotinus coggygria
- Cotinus obovatus
- Crataegus cestivalis
- Crataegus uniflora
- Croton alabamensis
- Cupressocyparis leylandii
- Cupressus arizonica
- Cyrilla racemiflora

D

- Diospyros virginiana

E

- Erythrina herbacea
- Euonymus americanus

F

- Fagus grandifolia
- Firmiana simplex
- Fraxinus americana
- Fraxinus pennsylvanica

G

- Gelsemium sempervirens
- Ginkgo biloba
- Gleditsia triacanthos
- Gordonia lasianthus
- Gymnocladus dioicus

H

- Halesia carolina
- Halesia diptera
- Hydrangea arborescens
- Hydrangea quercifolia
- Hypericum frondosa

I

- Ilex cassine
- Ilex decidua
- Ilex opaca
- Ilex vomitoria
- Ilex × attenuata
- Illicium floridanum
- Iris virginica
- Itea virginica

J

- Juglans cinerea
- Juglans nigra
- Juniperus virginiana

K

- Kalmia latifolia

L

- Laurus nobilis
- Leucothoe racemosa
- Leucothoe axillaris
- Lindera benzoin
- Liquidambar styraciflua
- Liriodendron tulipifera
- Lithocarpus henryi
- Lonicera sempervirens

M

- Maclura pomifera
- Magnolia acuminata
- Magnolia grandiflora
- Magnolia macrophylla
- Magnolia pyramidata
- Magnolia tripetala
- Malus angustifolia
- Melia azedarach
- Metasequoia glyptostroboides
- Morus rubra
- Myrica cerifera
- Myrica heterophylla

N

- Nerium oleander
- Neviusia alabamensis
- Nyssa aquatica
- Nyssa ogeche
- Nyssa sylvatica

O

- Osmanthus americanus
- Ostrya virginiana
- Oxydendrum arboreum

P

- Panicum grass
- Parthenocissus quinquefolia
- Passiflora incarnata
- Paulownia tomentosa
- Persea borbonia
- Physocarpus opulifolias
- Picea abies
- Pinckneya bracteata
- Pinus clausa
- Pinus echinata
- Pinus elliotii
- Pinus glabra
- Pinus nigra
- Pinus palustris
- Pinus rigida
- Pinus serotina
- Pinus strobus
- Pinus taeda
- Pinus virginiana
- Platanus occidentialis
- Poncirus trifoliata
- Populus deltoides
- Prunus caroliniana
- Prunus mexicana
- Prunus serotina
- Prunus serrulata
- Ptelea trifoliata

Q

- Quercus aqutissima
- Quercus alba
- Quercus austrina
- Quercus bicolor
- Quercus Boyntonii
- Quercus coccinea
- Quercus falcata var. falcata
- Quercus falcata var. pagodaefolia
- Quercus hemisphaerica
- Quercus imbricaria
- Quercus incana
- Quercus lyrata
- Quercus macrocarpa
- Quercus marilandica
- Quercus michauxii
- Quercus muehlenbergii
- Quercus nigra
- Quercus nuttallii
- Quercus palustris
- Quercus phellos
- Quercus prinus
- Quercus rubra
- Quercus shumardii
- Quercus stellata var. margaretta
- Quercus stellata var. stellata
- Quercus velutina
- Quercus virginiana

R

- Rhamnus caroliniana
- Rhapidophyllum hystrix
- Rhododendron alabamensis
- Rhododendron austrinum
- Rhododendron carolinianum
- Rhododendron maximum
- Rhododendron minus
- Rhododendron nudiflorum
- Rhus glabra
- Rhus typhinia
- Robinia pseudoacacia
- Rosmarinus officinalis

S

- Sagittaria lancifolia media
- Sagittaria latifolia
- Salix eriocephala
- Salix nigra
- Sambucus canadensis
- Sapium sebiferum
- Sassafras albidium
- Sarracenia oreophila
- Sideroxylon lanuginosum
- Sideroxylon lycioides
- Smilax
- Staphylea trifolia
- Stewartia malacodendron
- Styrax grandifolia
- Styrax americanus
- Symplocos tinctoria

T

- Taxodium ascendens
- Taxodium distichum
- Tilia americana
- Tilia heterophylla
- Toxicodendron pubescens
- Toxicodendron radicans
- Toxicodendron vernix
- Trachelospermum jasminoides
- Tsuga caroliniana
- Tsuga canadensis

U

- Ulmus americana
- Ulmus rubra

V

- Vaccinium arboreum
- Viburnum acerifolium
- Viburnum dentatum
- Viburnum nudum
- Viburnum prunifolium
- Viburnum rufidulum
- Vitis rotundifolia

W

- Wisteria floribunda
- Wisteria sinensis

Y

- Yucca filamentosa
- Yucca gloriosa

Z

- Zanthoxylum clava-herculis
- Zephyranthes atamasca

== See also ==
- List of botanical gardens and arboretums in Alabama
- Flora and fauna of Alabama
- Alabama Champion Tree Program
