= Red oak (disambiguation) =

Red oaks are tree species in the genus Quercus section Lobatae.

Red oak, Red Oak or Redoak may also refer to:

== Trees ==
- Quercus buckleyi, Texas red oak
- Quercus falcata, southern red oak
- Quercus graciliformis, Mexican white oak, Canby oak, or Chisos oak
- Quercus rubra, the northern red oak, with a large range in southeastern and south-central Canada and the eastern and central United States
- Carnarvonia araliifolia, a rainforest tree from Australia

== Places ==
- Red Oak, Georgia, an area of Fulton County, Georgia
- Red Oak, Illinois, an unincorporated community
- Red Oak, Iowa, a town in southwestern Iowa
- Red Oak, Bell County, Kentucky, an unincorporated community
- Red Oak, Michigan, an unincorporated community
- Red Oak, Missouri, an unincorporated community
- Red Oak, North Carolina, a town
- Redoak, Ohio, an unincorporated community
- Red Oak, Oklahoma, a town
- Red Oak, Texas, a city
- Red Oak, Virginia, an unincorporated community
- Red Oaks Mill, New York, a hamlet and census-designated place
- Red Oak (power station), in Sayreville, New Jersey

== Other uses ==
- Red Oaks, a 2015 American comedy-drama streaming television series
- Red Oak (beer), a North Carolina-based microbrewery
- Agkistrodon contortrix, a venomous snake species found in North America
- Red Oak High School (disambiguation)

== See also ==
- Oak red, a coloring matter formed from the oak bark tannins
- Red Oak Creek (disambiguation)
