= Stigmella oxyacanthella =

Scientific classification
- Kingdom: Animalia
- Phylum: Arthropoda
- Class: Insecta
- Order: Lepidoptera
- Family: Nepticulidae
- Genus: Stigmella
- Species: S. oxyacanthella

Binomial name
- Stigmella oxyacanthella (Stainton, 1854)

Synonyms
- List: Nepticula oxyacanthella Stainton, 1854; Nepticula cotoneastri Sorhagen, 1922; Stigmella aeneella (auct.); Stigmella oxtacanthella (misspelling)

Species of moth

Stigmella oxyacanthella is a moth of the family Nepticulidae, found in Europe and North America. The larvae are leaf miners feeding inside the leaves of trees and shrubs, such as hawthorn, apple and pear.

== Description ==
The wingspan is 5–6 mm.A small, dark bronze-coloured moth. The antennae are filamentous, dark and about half as long as the forewing. The innermost, greatly expanded joint is white, the head is covered with yellow hairs, at the back with a white collar. The body is dark. The forewings are dark bronze-coloured, with no light transverse band. The hind wing is narrow, grey, with long fringes. The species is very similar to several other Stigmella species, one must examine genitalia preparations with a microscope to determine these species with certainty. Meyrick-The head is rust yellow, collar white. Antennal eyecaps white. Forewings are shiny bronze brown basal to the tip which has a steel blue shimmer. Hindwings grey.

== Biology ==
Adults are on wing in June in one generation.

=== Ova ===
Eggs are laid on the underside of the leaves of snowy mespilus (Amelanchier ovalis), common cotoneaster (Cotoneaster integerrimus), Cotoneaster multiflorus, azarole (Crataegus azarolus), fireberry hawthorn (Crataegus chrysocarpa), scarlet hawthorn (Crataegus coccinea), cockspur hawthorn (Crataegus crus-galli), black hawthorn (Crataegus douglasii), Crataegus laciniata, Midland hawthorn (Crataegus laevigata), hybrid cockspurthorn (Crataegus x lavalleei), hawthorn (Crataegus monogyna), small-flowered black hawthorn (Crataegus pentagyna), dotted hawthorn (Crataegus punctata), river hawthorn (Crataegus rivularis), littlehip hawthorn (Crataegus spathulata), Crataemespilus arnieresi, Crataemespilus grandiflora, quince (Cydonia oblonga), southern crabapple (Malus angustifolia), Malus x astracanica, Siberian crab apple (Malus baccata), sweet crabapple (Malus coronaria), apple (Malus domestica), Japanese flowering crabapple (Malus floribunda), Oregon crabapple (Malus fusca), Malus parviflora, Malus ringo, European crab apple (Malus sylvestris), medlar (Mespilus germanica), cultivated apricot (Prunus armeniaca), wild cherry (Prunus avium), blackthorn (Prunus spinosa), almond-leaved pear (Pyrus amygdaliformis), Tang li (Pyrus betulaefolia), common pear (Pyrus communis), oleaster-leafed pear (Pyrus elaeagrifolia) and rowan (Sorbus aucuparia).

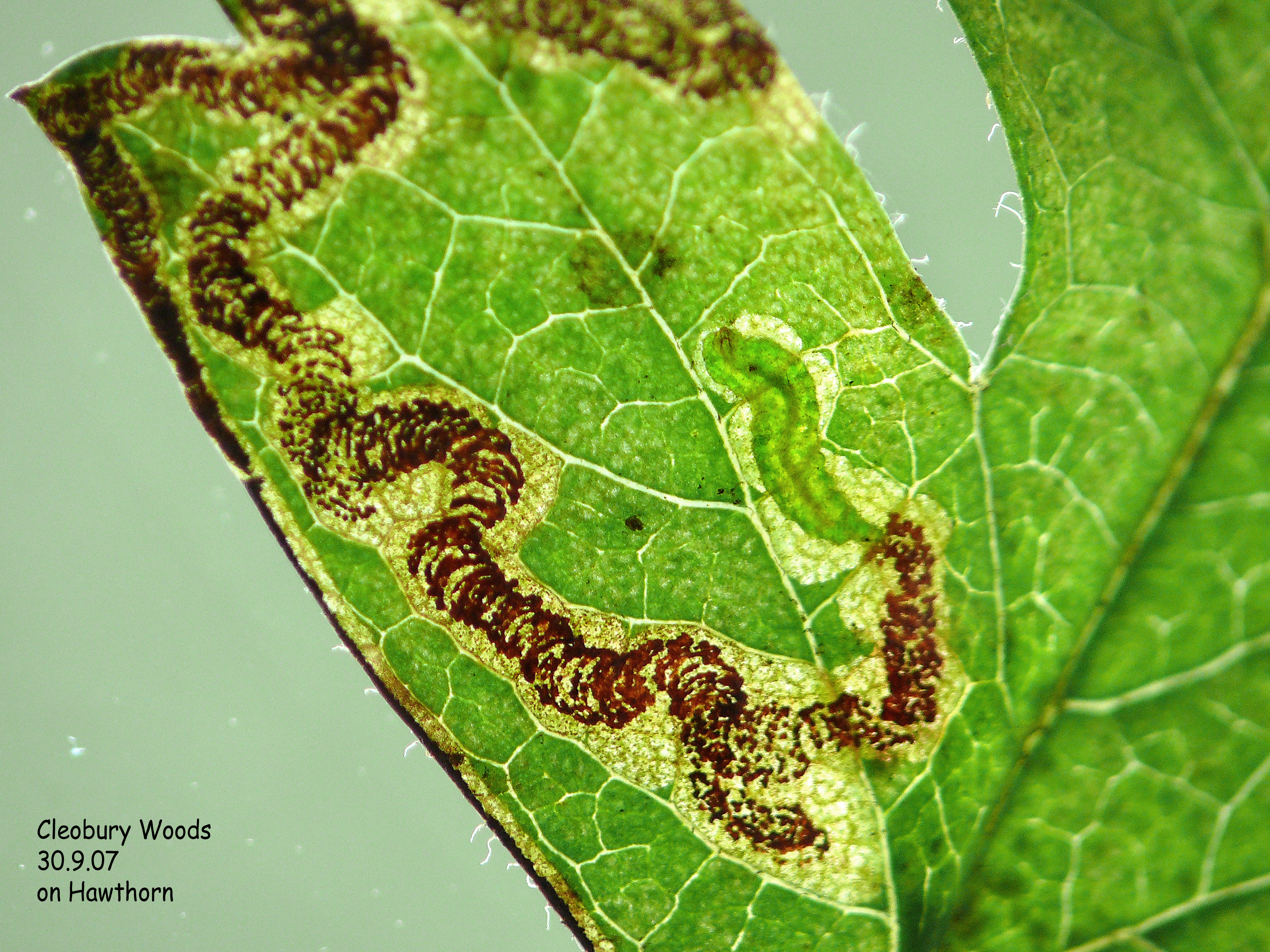
Stigmella oxyacanthella larva and mine on hawthorn

=== Larvae ===
Larvae are bright green with a pale brown to dark grey head and can be found in September and October. The mine starts as a long, slender gallery, often following a rib or the edge of a leaf; the frass is linear. It then becomes abruptly wider and is filled with neatly coiled reddish frass. The latter part of the mine than becomes long and sinuous and can extend along the rest of the leaf; the frass is in a narrow, irregular central line. In thick, sun-exposed leaves the mine may be significantly shorter.

=== Pupa ===
Pupa, can be found from October to June, in a dark cocoon usually spun on the soil or in detritus.

== Distribution ==
In Europe it is found from Fennoscandia to the Pyrenees, Italy and Bulgaria, and from Ireland to central Russia. It is considered to be an exotic in North America where it has been recorded in British Columbia, Ontario and Nova Scotia. In the USA, it has been found in Vermont.

== Etymology ==
Stigmella oxyacanthella was originally named Nepticula oxyacanthella by Henry Tibbats Stainton, in 1854, from a specimen found in England. Nepticula, refers to a grand-daughter, the smallest member of a family (i.e. the small size of the moth), while oxyacanthella refers to the specific name of one of the food plants, Midland hawthorn, which was originally called Crataegus oxyacanthoides. The genus Stigmella – ″stigma″, refers to the conspicuous (or occasionally metallic) small dot or a brand fascia on the forewing of many of the Stigmella species, or possibly the small size of the moths.
