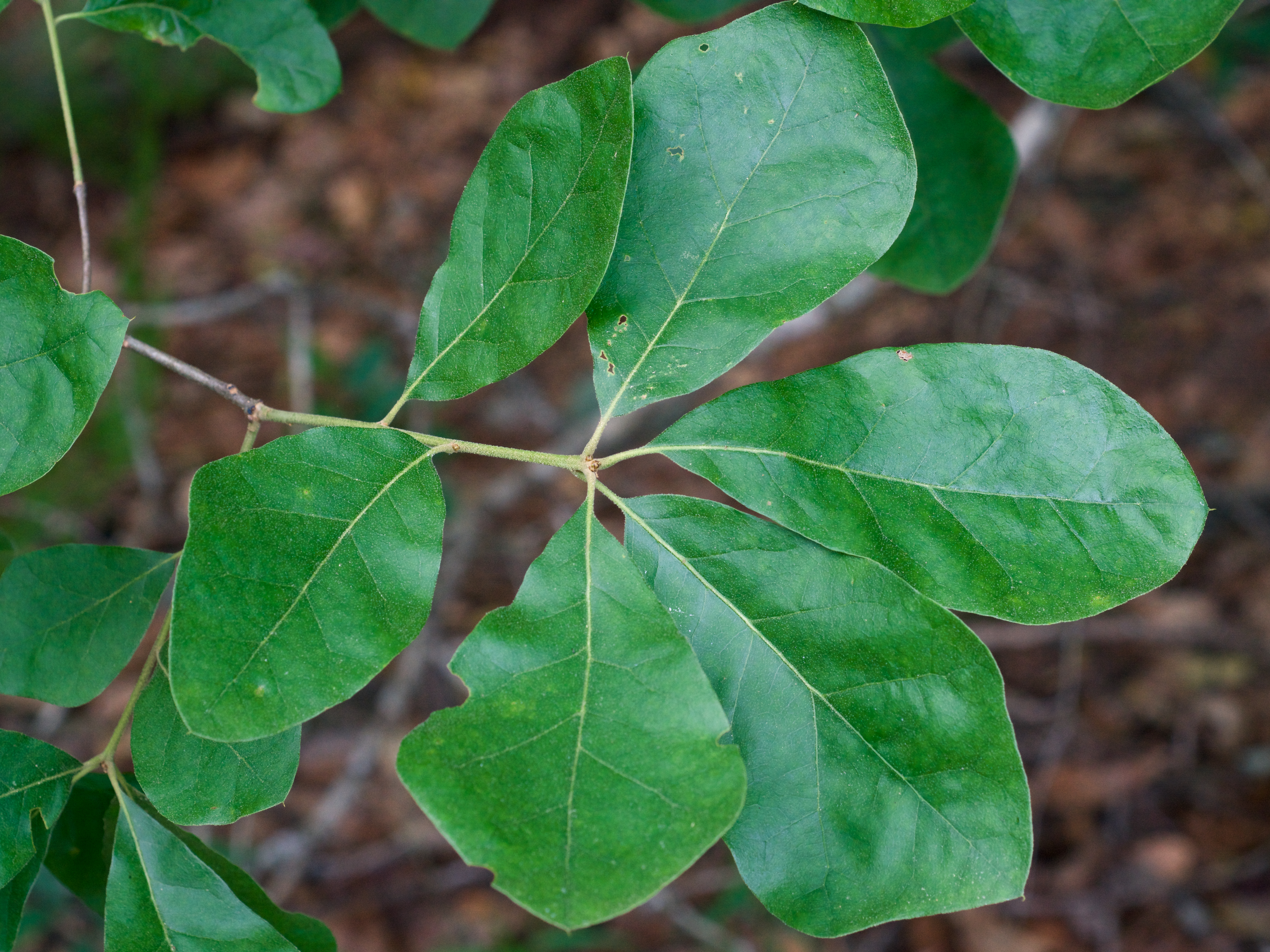

Conservation status
- Vulnerable (IUCN 3.1)

Scientific classification
- Kingdom: Plantae
- Clade: Embryophytes
- Clade: Tracheophytes
- Clade: Spermatophytes
- Clade: Angiosperms
- Clade: Eudicots
- Clade: Rosids
- Order: Fagales
- Family: Fagaceae
- Genus: Quercus
- Subgenus: Quercus subg. Quercus
- Section: Quercus sect. Lobatae
- Species: Q. arkansana

Binomial name
- Quercus arkansana Sarg.
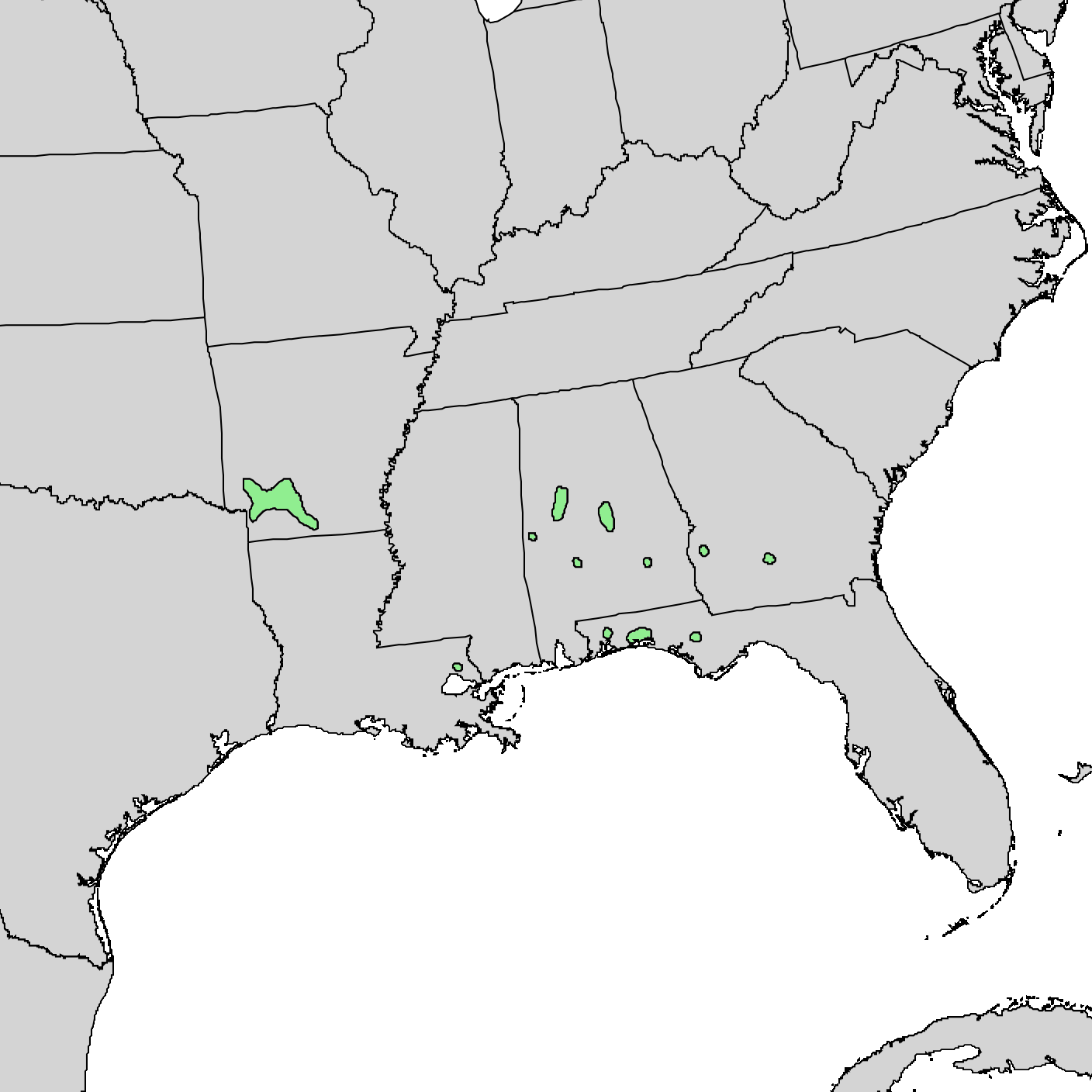
- Natural range of Quercus arkansana

Synonyms
- Quercus arkansana var. caput-rivuli (Ashe) Ashe; Quercus caput-rivuli Ashe

= Quercus arkansana =

Arkansas oak

Species of oak tree

Quercus arkansana, the Arkansas oak, is a species of oak tree. It is native to the southeastern United States (eastern Texas, southern Arkansas, Louisiana, Mississippi, Alabama, Georgia, and the Florida Panhandle). It is threatened by use of its habitat for pine plantations, clearing of land, and diebacks that may be caused by drought.

== Description ==
Quercus arkansana is a deciduous tree growing up to 15 meters (49 feet) tall. The bark is black. The leaves are sometimes unlobed and sometimes with 2 or 3 shallow lobes.

== Habitat ==
Quercus arkansana is shade-loving tree that grows in the understories of mesic pine forests and southern hardwood stands, and it is frequently reported from sandhills, the upper portions of ravines, steepheads, and above the heads of small streams. It is rarely a dominant component of the vegetation, except for a few places in Arkansas and Florida where it is found in large stands. It grows alongside Pinus taeda, P. echinata and other pines, as well as other oaks such as Quercus nigra, Q. pagoda, Q. margarettae, and Q. hemisphaerica. It grows among various other hardwoods including Nyssa sylvatica, Liquidambar styraciflua, Vaccinium arboreum, Sassafras albidum, Magnolia grandiflora, and Diospyros virginiana. It has been observed to form hybrids between Q. arkansana and Q. nigra in Georgia, and introgression from Q. falcata has been observed in Texas.
