= Red Oak Creek =

Red Oak Creek may refer to:

- Red Oak Creek (Georgia)
- Red Oak Creek (Missouri)
- Red Oak Creek (Trinity River), a stream in Texas
- Red Oak Creek (West Virginia)
