= Red Oak Creek (West Virginia) =

Stream in West Virginia, U.S.

Coordinates: 39°15′12″N 79°23′54″W

Red Oak Creek is a stream in the U.S. state of West Virginia.

Red Oak Creek was named for the red oak trees which once lined its banks.

== See also ==
- List of rivers of West Virginia
