= Red Oak High School =

Red Oak High School may refer to:

- Red Oak High School (Iowa), Red Oak, Iowa
- Red Oak High School (Oklahoma), Red Oak, Oklahoma
- Red Oak High School (Texas), Red Oak, Texas
