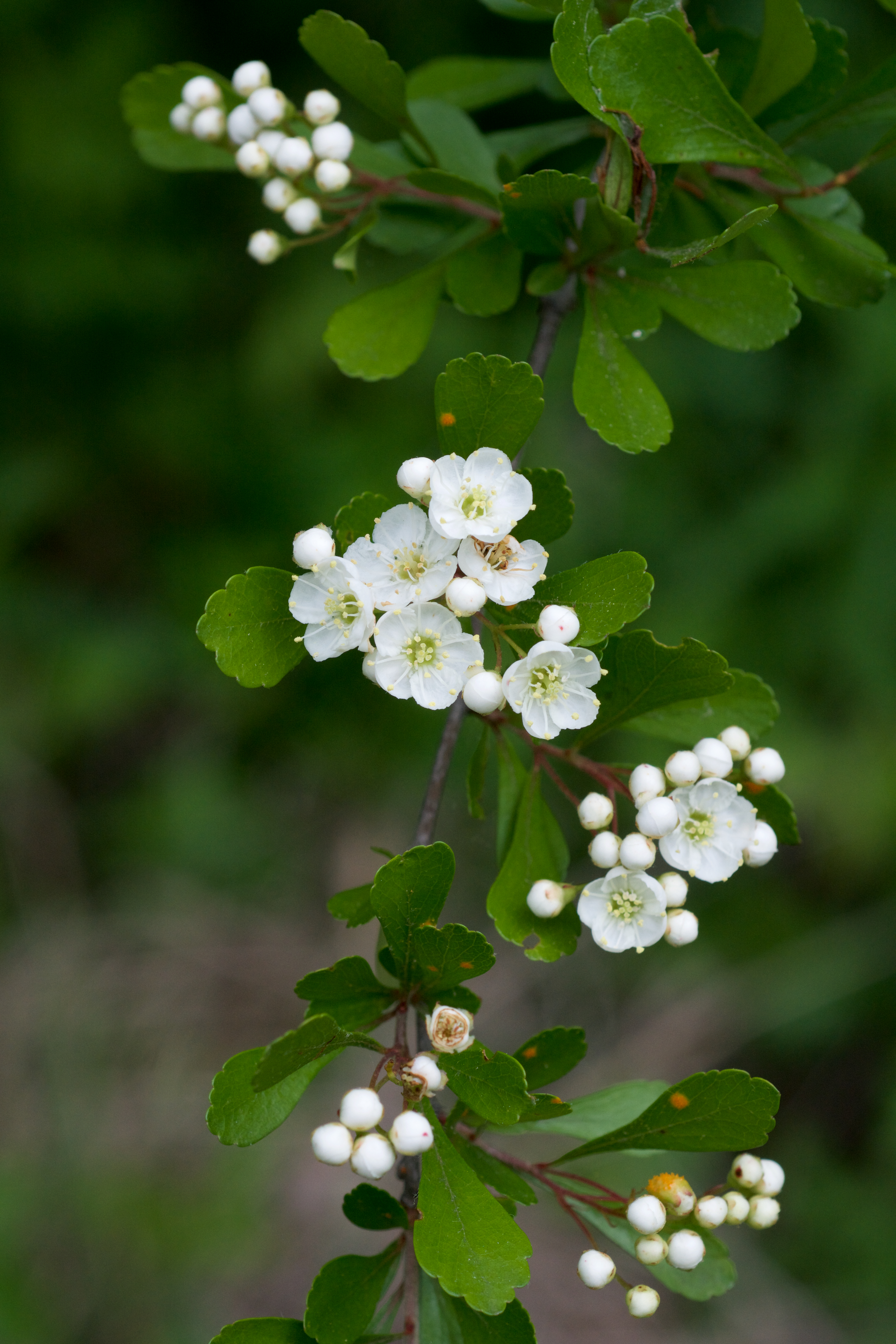

Conservation status
- Least Concern (IUCN 3.1)

Scientific classification
- Kingdom: Plantae
- Clade: Tracheophytes
- Clade: Angiosperms
- Clade: Eudicots
- Clade: Rosids
- Order: Rosales
- Family: Rosaceae
- Genus: Crataegus
- Species: C. spathulata

Binomial name
- Crataegus spathulata Michx.

= Crataegus spathulata =

Species of hawthorn

Crataegus spathulata is a species of hawthorn known by the common name littlehip hawthorn. It is native to the southeastern United States. It has very attractive small delicate leaves with a bluish appearance, pretty flowers and small orange to red fruit.

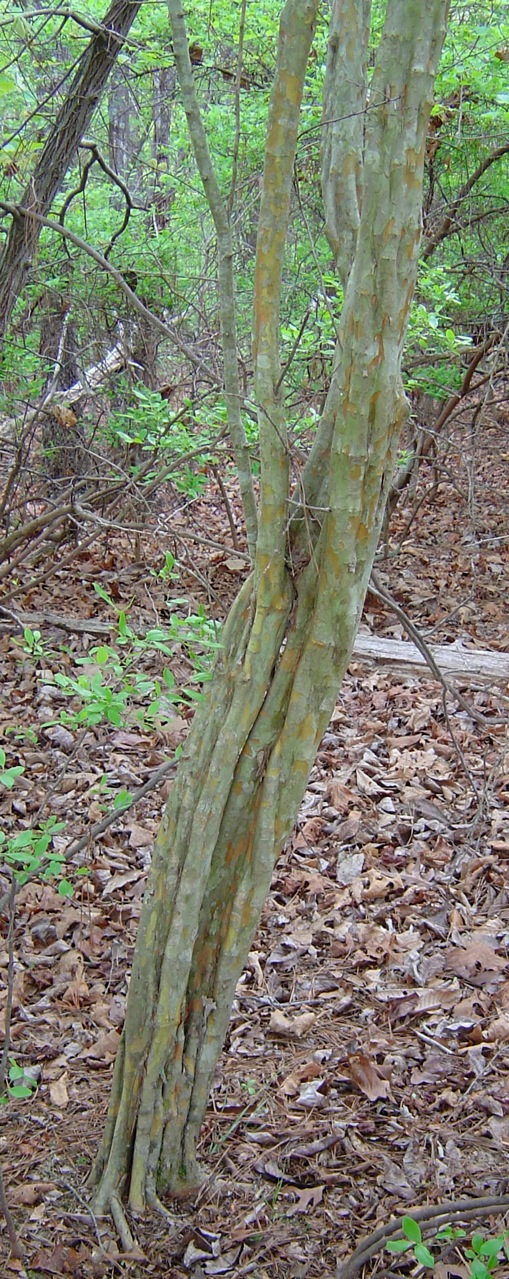
Bark of C. spathulata
