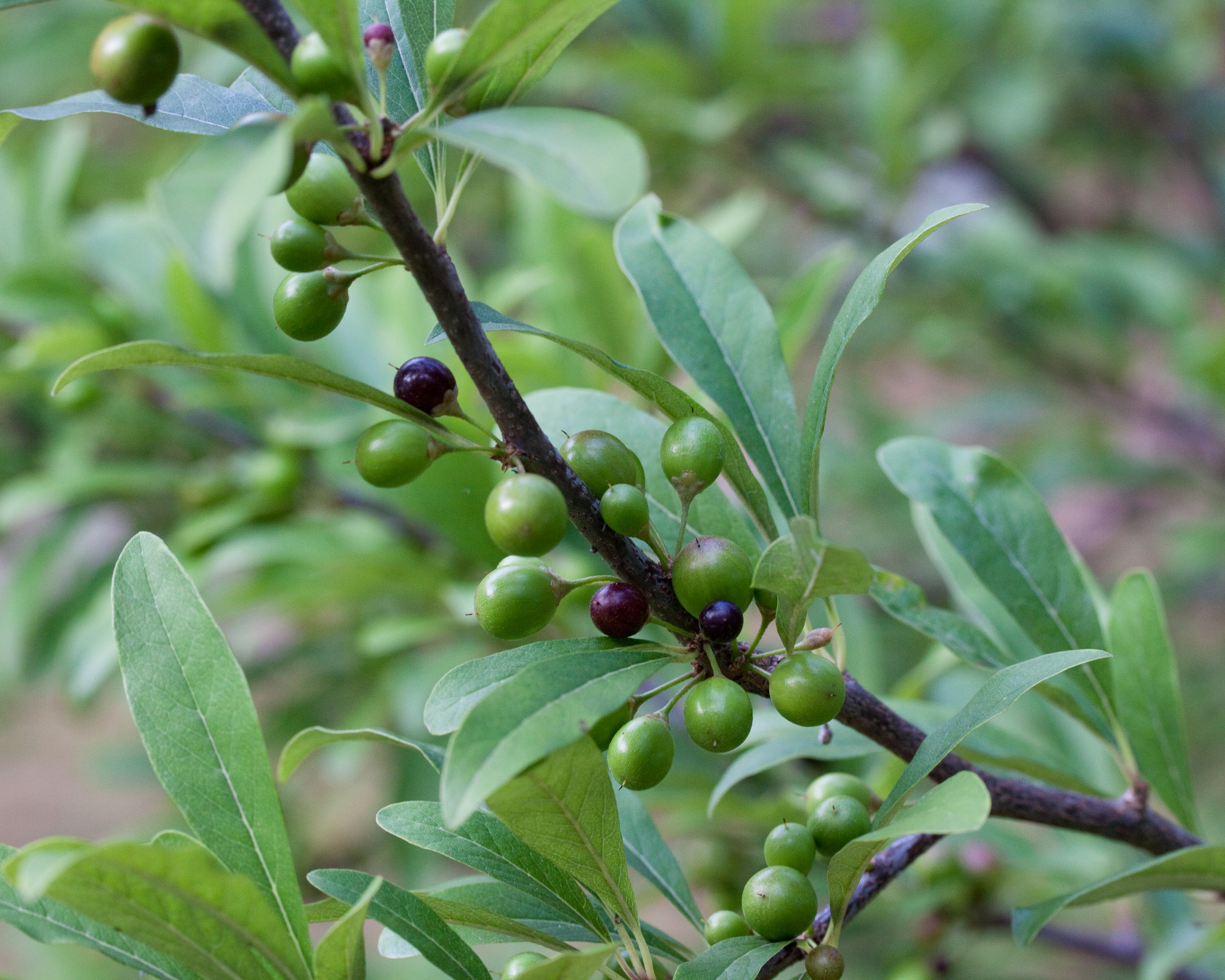

Conservation status
- Least Concern (IUCN 3.1)

- Secure (NatureServe)

Scientific classification
- Kingdom: Plantae
- Clade: Embryophytes
- Clade: Tracheophytes
- Clade: Spermatophytes
- Clade: Angiosperms
- Clade: Eudicots
- Clade: Asterids
- Order: Ericales
- Family: Sapotaceae
- Genus: Sideroxylon
- Species: S. lycioides

Binomial name
- Sideroxylon lycioides L.
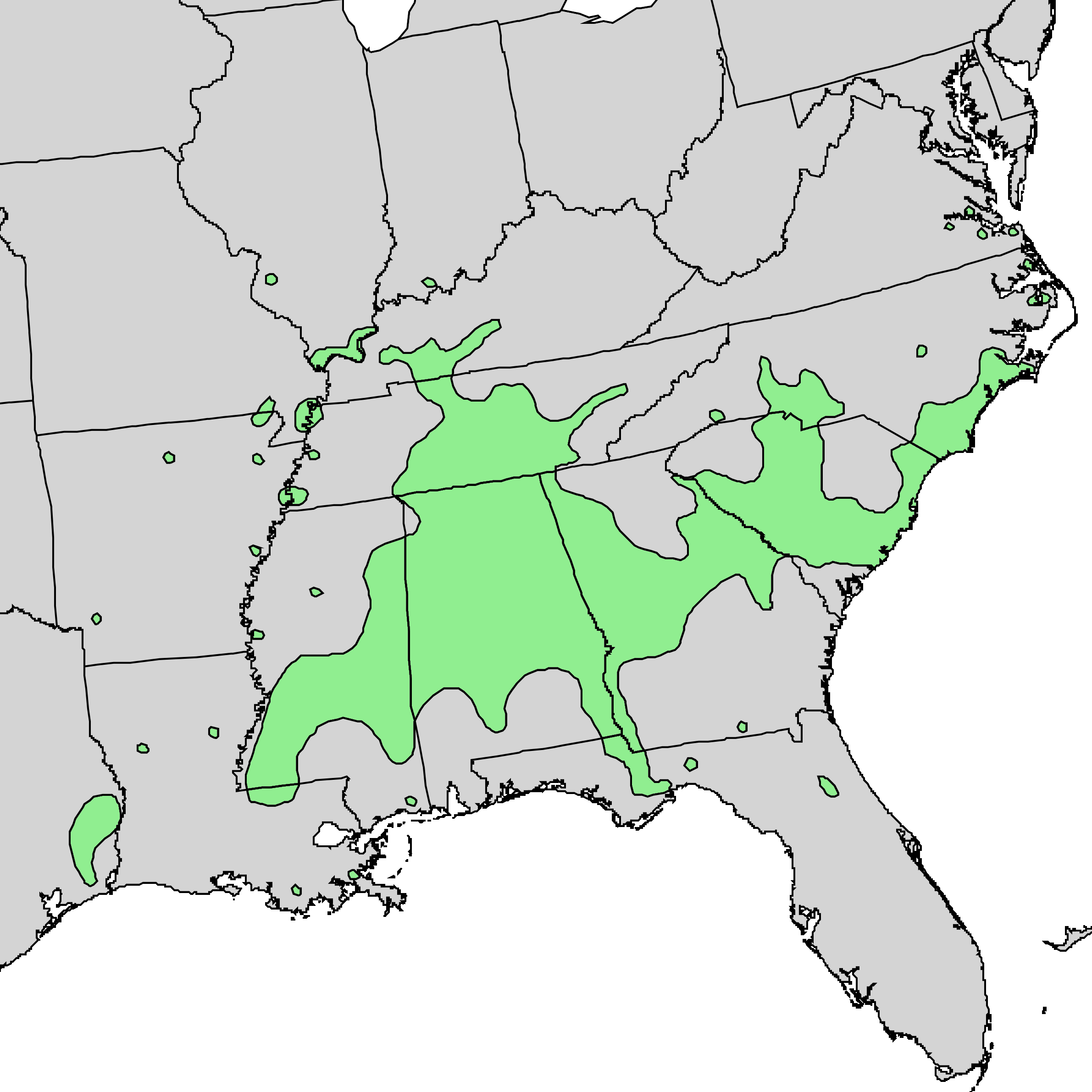
- Natural range

Synonyms
- Bumelia lycioides

= Sideroxylon lycioides =

Buckthorn bully

Species of tree

Sideroxylon lycioides, the buckthorn bully, is a small tree in the family Sapotaceae. It is widely distributed in the southeastern United States from Texas to southeast Virginia.

The fruit pulp is thin but edible and consumed by birds. Livestock browse the plant's foliage.
