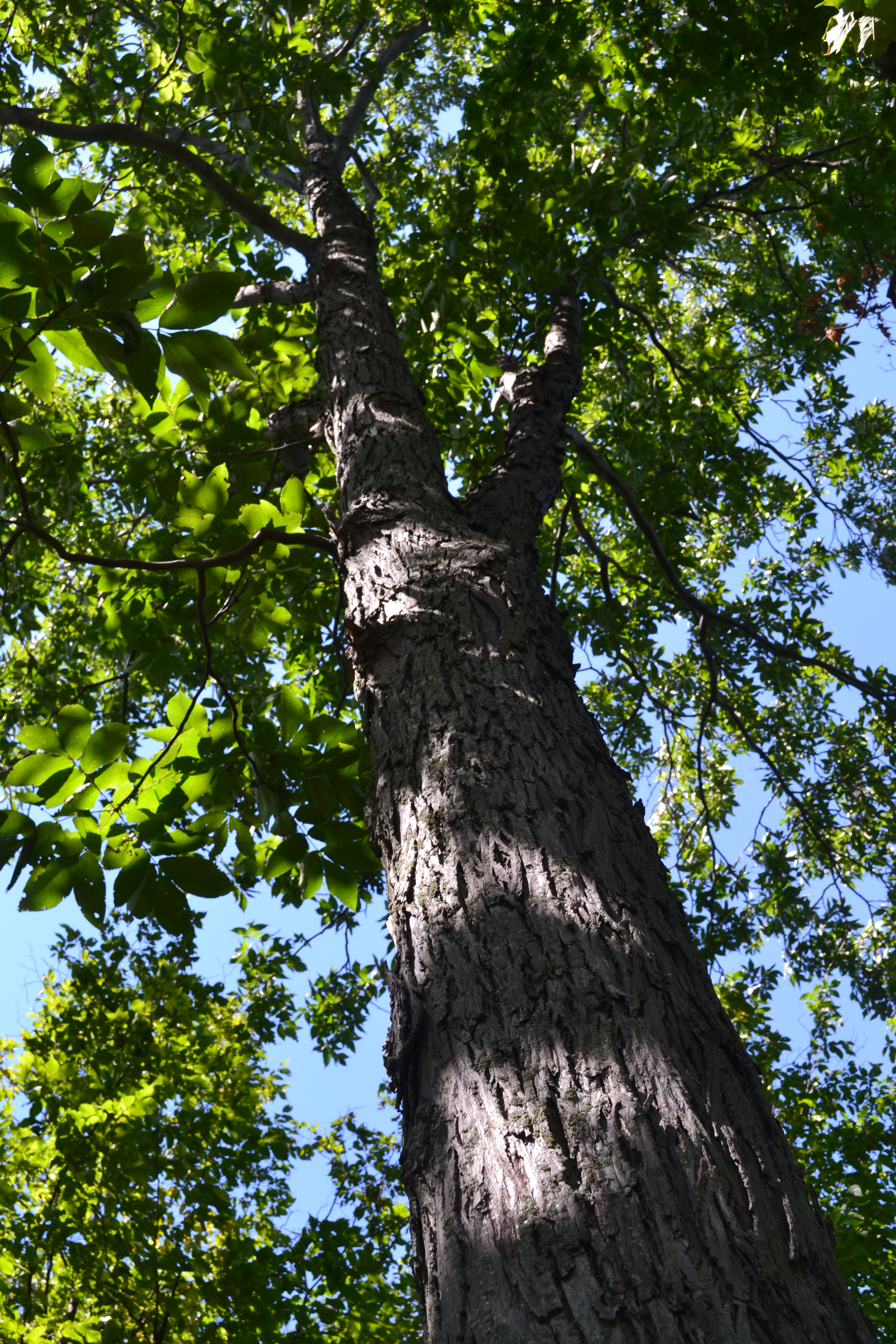

Conservation status
- Secure (NatureServe)

Scientific classification
- Kingdom: Plantae
- Clade: Tracheophytes
- Clade: Angiosperms
- Clade: Eudicots
- Clade: Rosids
- Order: Fagales
- Family: Juglandaceae
- Genus: Carya
- Section: Carya sect. Carya
- Species: C. ovalis

Binomial name
- Carya ovalis (Wangenh.) Sarg.

= Carya ovalis =

Species of tree

Carya ovalis, the red hickory or sweet pignut hickory, is a fairly uncommon but widespread hickory native to eastern North America. It is typically found growing in dry, well drained sandy upland ridges and sloped woodlands from southern Ontario, Canada, and in the United States east to New Hampshire, south to northern Florida west to eastern Texas and north-west to Nebraska. This species was formerly treated as a variety or northern ecotype of the pignut hickory C. glabra, described as Carya glabra var. odorata. This discrepancy has not yet been completely resolved, and some sources and authors still consider red hickory as a variety or synonym of pignut hickory. However both trees are quite morphologically distinct.

== Description ==
The red hickory is generally encountered as a medium-sized tree, capable of growing to 30 m (100 ft) in height. The single trunk is straight and often continues for the entire height of the tree, although sometimes splits into several large limbs once the canopy has been breached. The branches are strong, stout and long, ascending in the upper crown and drooping in the lower crown; the branches around mid-height are more or less horizontal. This creates a broad, thick, column-shaped form that casts dense shade. Individuals have been known to live from 100–250 years of age. The largest known red hickory, located in Clay County, Kentucky, is 175 feet tall and 56 inches in diameter at breast height.

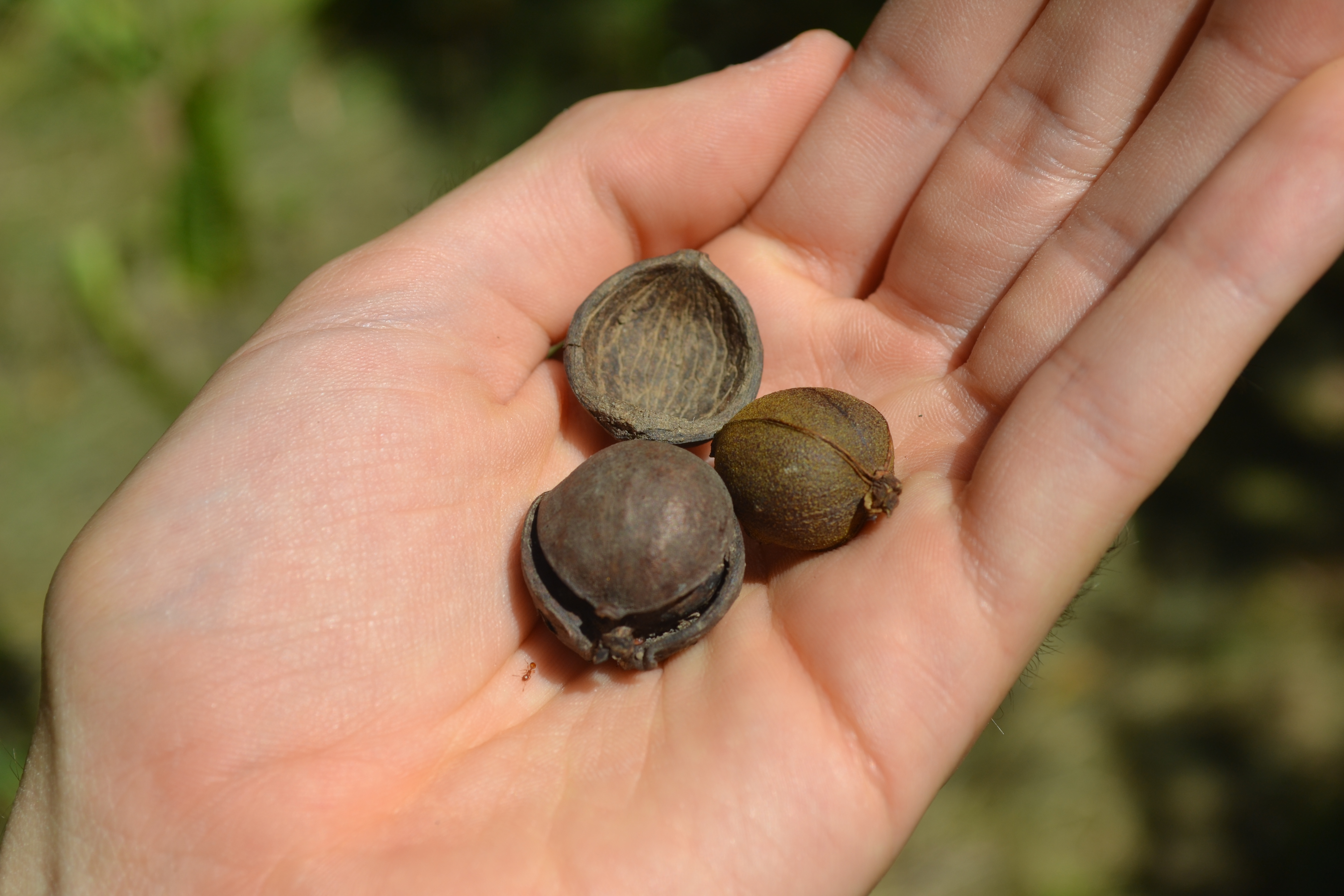
Thin-shelled nuts of red hickory

The leaves are pinnately compound, typically producing five to nine leaflets (seven being the most common). The terminal leaflet is often the largest, with the auxiliary leaflets decreasing in size from the tip to the base of the rachis. Leaflets are broadest above or at their median length, with finely serrated margins. They are dark green and smooth or glaucous above and paler and finely pubescent underneath. The rachis of the leaves are usually bright red or purple in color, a distinctive feature of red hickory that helps to separate it from pignut hickory.

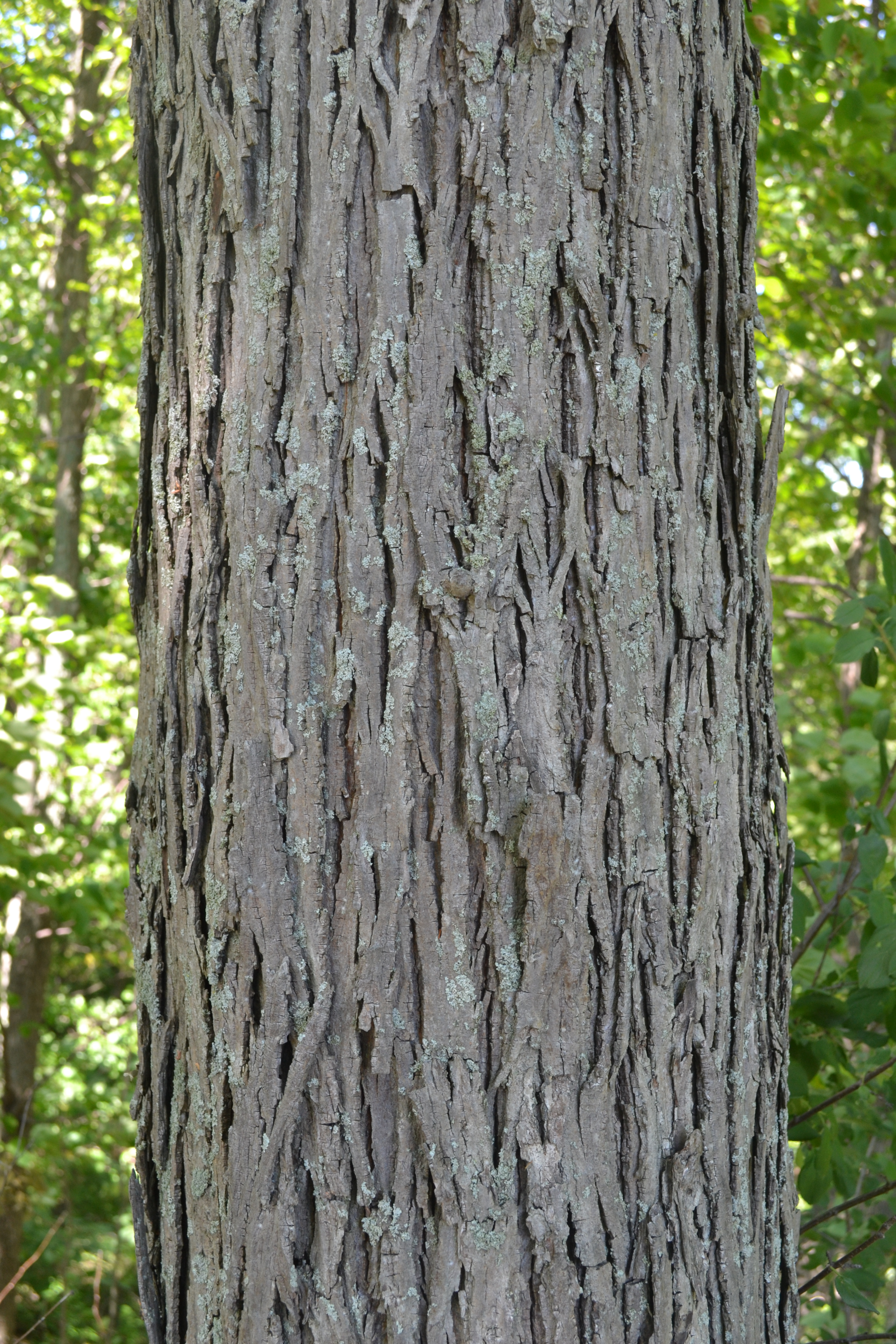
The bark of a mature red hickory

The bark of mature trees is grey, composed of tight, flat-topped intersecting ridges that can appear quite blocky but are generally strap-like. Occasionally, the ridges may separate from the trunk in peeling strips, loose at both ends, a trait characteristic of shagbark and shellbark hickories. Young, vigorously growing trees are more prone to producing peeling bark than mature individuals.

Like all hickories, the fruit is a small round or slightly elliptical nut, born singly or in groups of two or three on the ends of bearing branches. When immature, the nut is encased in a thin, green husk with four distinct seams. Upon maturity (late September to mid-October) the husk changes from being green, fleshy and flexible to dark brown and very brittle. The seams then split from the base upwards and may or may not completely separate from the ripe nut. The nut itself is smooth, tan to beige in color and has four shallow ridges from the seams. The inner kernel is very oily and varies in flavor from bitter and unpalatable to mildly sweet. For such a small nut, the shell is thick and the kernel difficult to extract. These nuts are relished by countless wildlife species, including many rodents and birds, as well as raccoons and wild turkeys.

The flowers emerge in the spring at the same times as the developing leaves (early to late May). The male flowers are long, green, inconspicuous drooping catkins that develop between the base of the petiole and the developing twig. The female flowers are bizarre looking, with a tuft of sticky green tissue emerging from a swollen base. These develop individually or in groups at the end of a new twig, after the expanding leaves. All hickories are self-infertile and monoecious.
