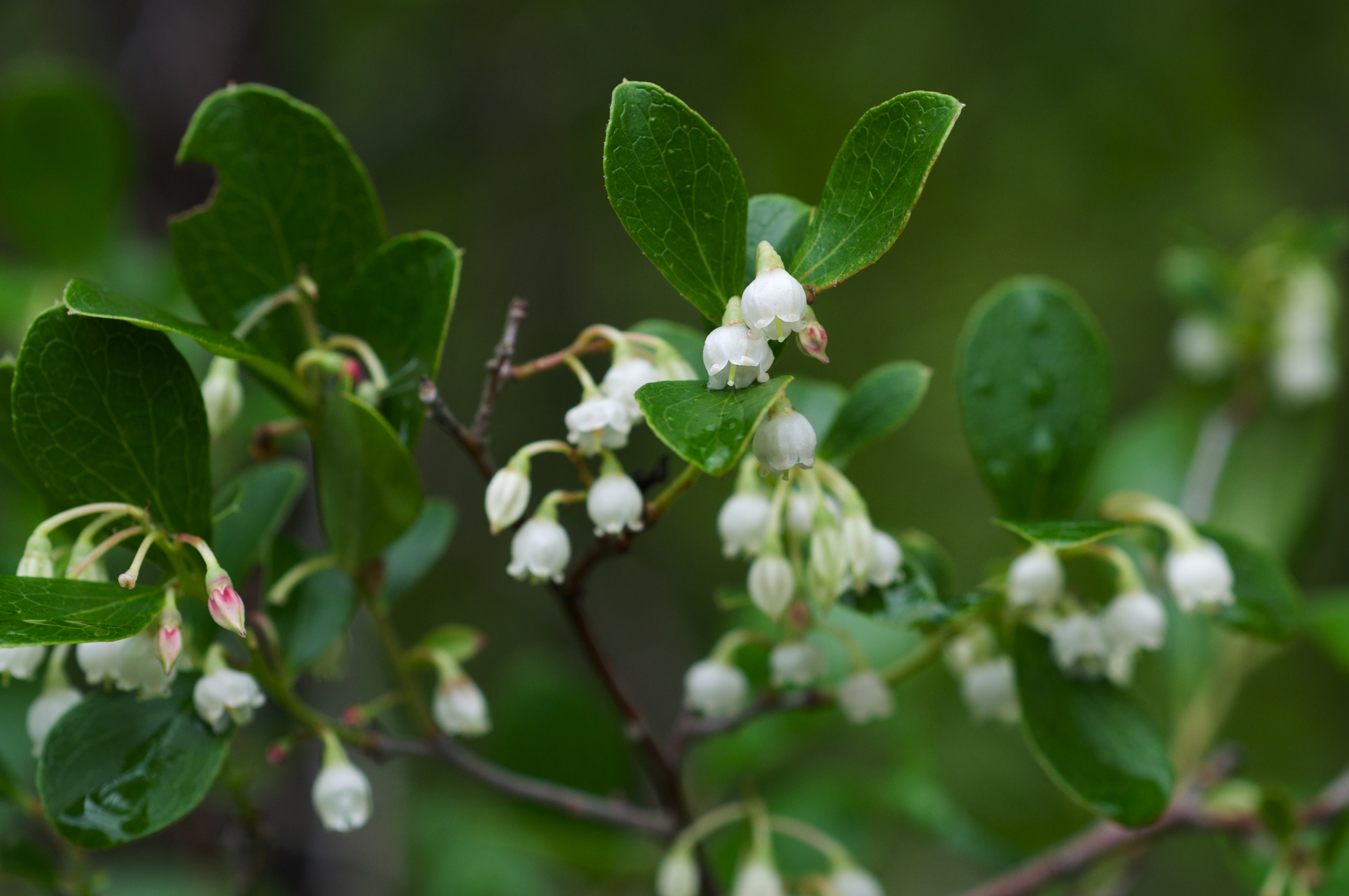

Conservation status
- Least Concern (IUCN 3.1)

Scientific classification
- Kingdom: Plantae
- Clade: Embryophytes
- Clade: Tracheophytes
- Clade: Spermatophytes
- Clade: Angiosperms
- Clade: Eudicots
- Clade: Asterids
- Order: Ericales
- Family: Ericaceae
- Genus: Vaccinium
- Species: V. arboreum

Binomial name
- Vaccinium arboreum Marshall 1785
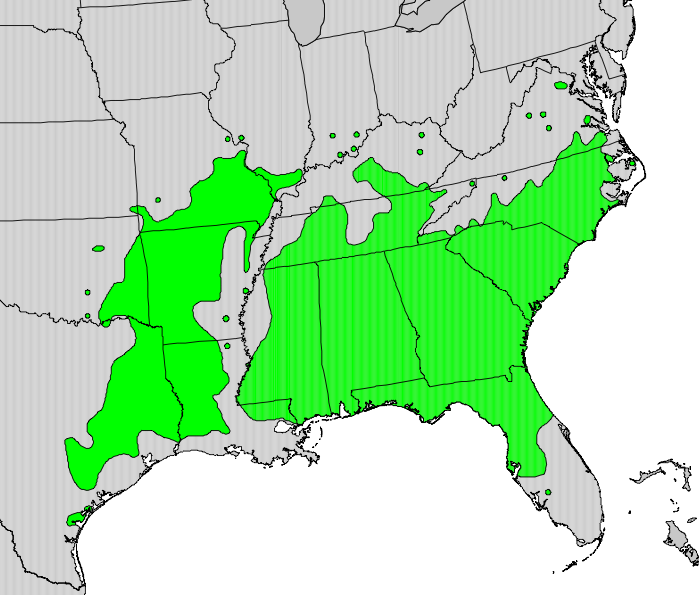

Synonyms
- Batodendron glaucescens Greene; Batodendron arboreum (Marshall) Nutt.

= Vaccinium arboreum =

Species of fruit and plant

Vaccinium arboreum (sparkleberry or farkleberry) is a species of Vaccinium native to the southeastern and south-central United States.

== Description ==
Vaccinium arboreum is a shrub (rarely a small tree) growing to 3–5 metres (10–16 1/2 ft), rarely 9 m (30 ft) tall, with a diameter at breast height of up to 35 centimetres (14 in). The leaves are evergreen in the south of the range, but deciduous further north where winters are colder; they are oval-elliptic with an acute apex, 3–7 cm (1 1/4–2 3/4 in) long and 2–4 cm broad, with a smooth or very finely toothed margin.

The flowers are white, bell-shaped, and 3–4 millimetres (1/8–3/16 in) in diameter with a five-lobed corolla, produced in racemes up to 5 cm (2 in) long. The fruit is a round dry berry about 6 mm (1/4 in) in diameter, green at first, black when ripe, bitter and tough. Cytology is 2n = 24.

== Distribution and habitat ==
Sparkleberry could be found in the United States from southern Virginia west to southeastern Nebraska, south to Florida and eastern Texas, and north to Illinois. It grows in sandy and rocky habitats, including dry woods. It also grows on a variety of moist sites such as wet bottomlands and along creek banks.

== Ecology ==
The berries are eaten by various wildlife.

== Uses ==
Because of its relative hardiness in comparison to other Vaccinium species, V. arboreum has been investigated as a potential rootstock for expanding the range of blueberry cultivation to less acidic soils (pH>6.0) and reducing the severity of bacterial leaf scorch.
