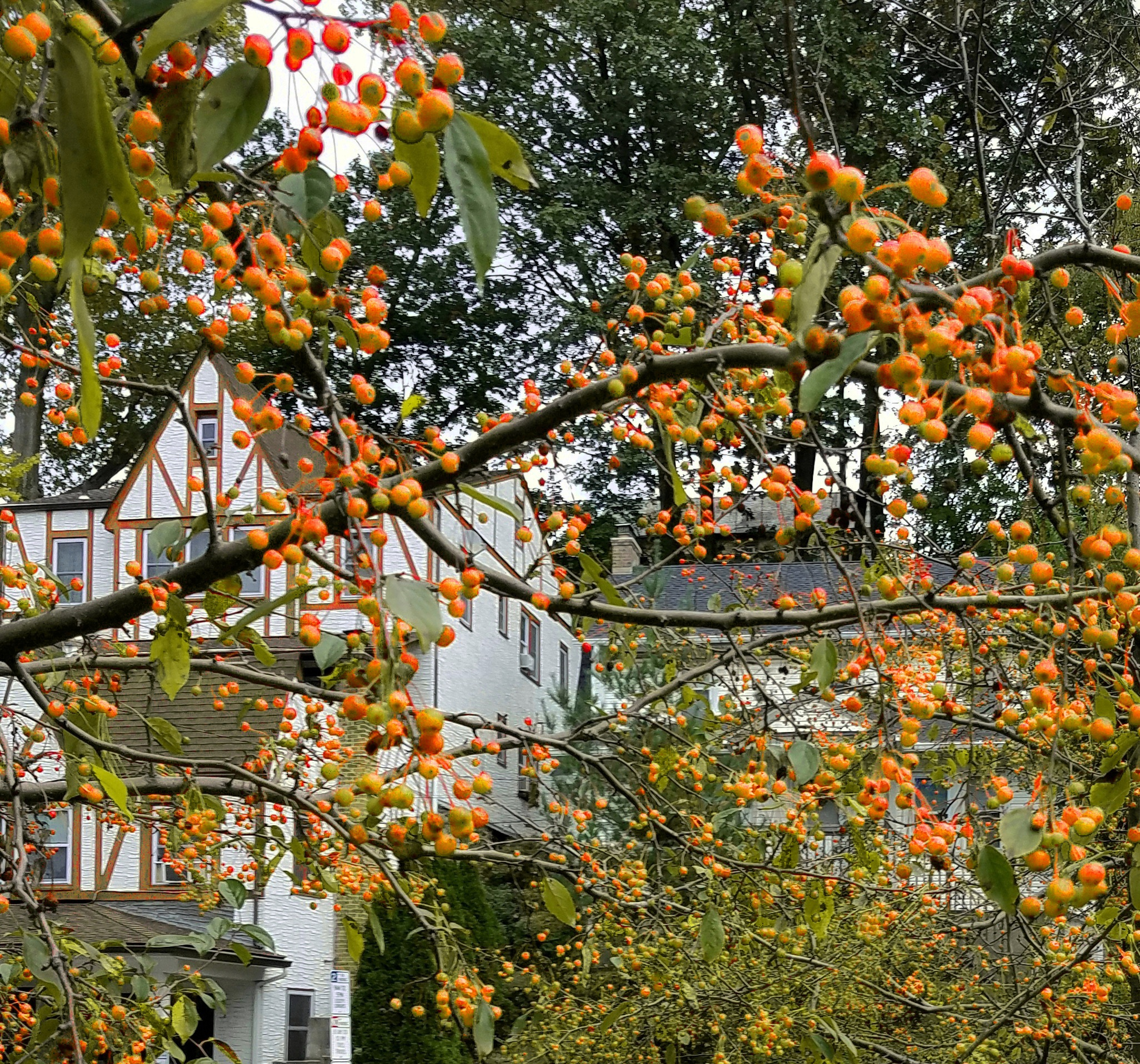
- Malus angustifolia (southern crabapple) in October

Conservation status
- Least Concern (IUCN 3.1)

Scientific classification
- Kingdom: Plantae
- Clade: Embryophytes
- Clade: Tracheophytes
- Clade: Spermatophytes
- Clade: Angiosperms
- Clade: Eudicots
- Clade: Rosids
- Order: Rosales
- Family: Rosaceae
- Genus: Malus
- Species: M. angustifolia

Binomial name
- Malus angustifolia (Aiton) Michx. 1803 not Rehder 1940
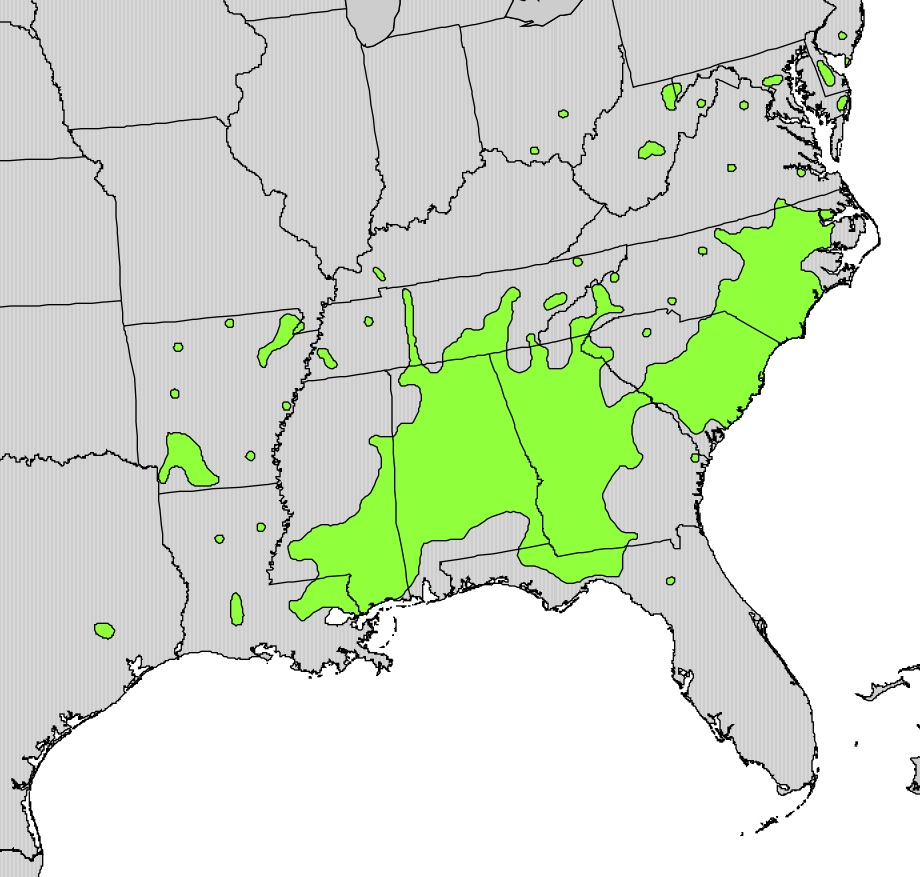
- Natural range

Synonyms
- Pyrus angustifolia Aiton 1789; Malus coronaria var. puberula Rehder; Pyrus angustifolia var. puberula (Rehder) L.H.Bailey; Pyrus angustifolia var. spinosa (Rehder) L.H.Bailey

= Malus angustifolia =

Species of apple tree

Malus angustifolia, or southern crabapple, is a species of crabapple native to the eastern and south-central United States.

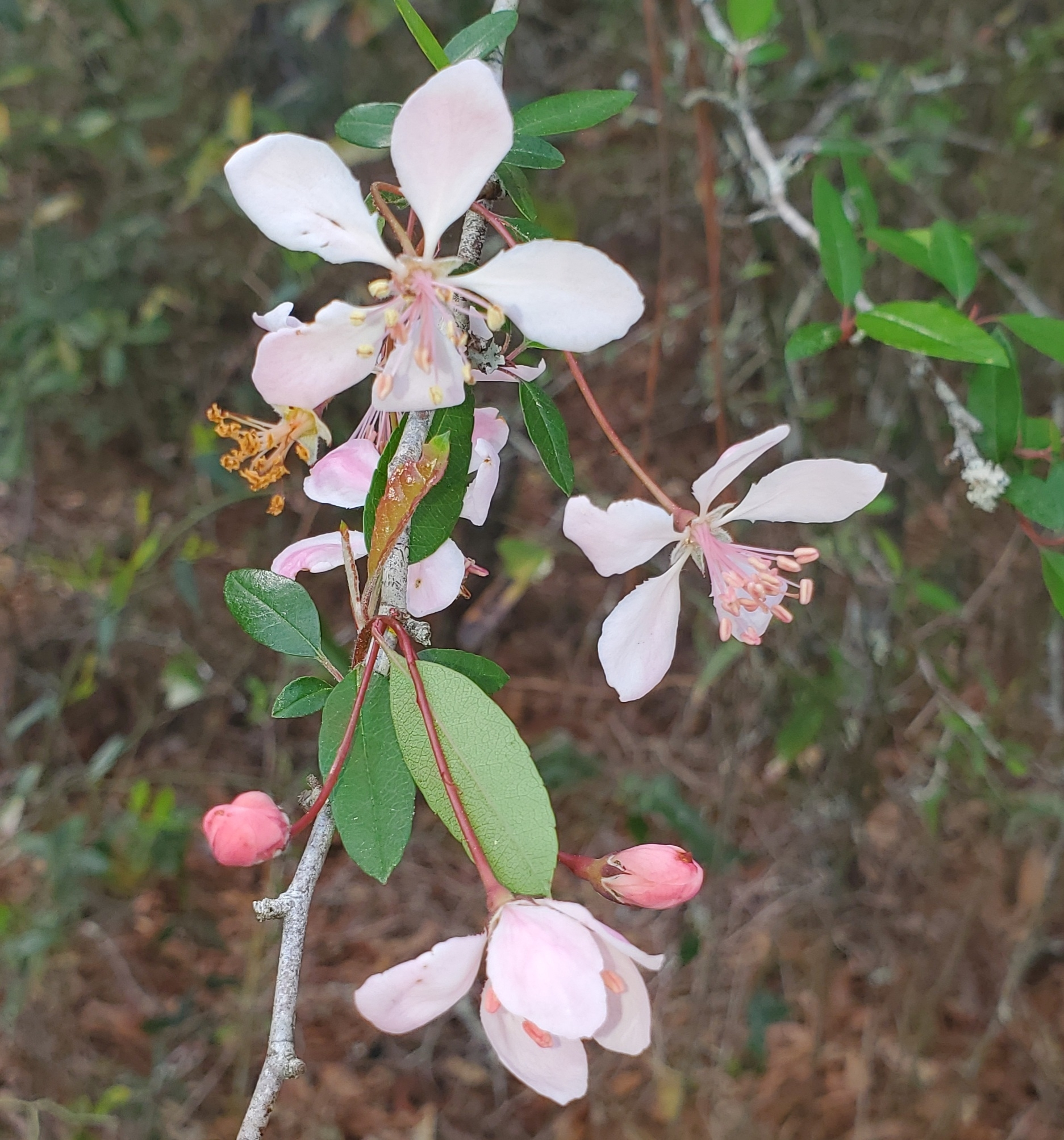
Blossoms

== Description ==
M. angustifolia is a tree sometimes attaining a height of 10 meters (33 feet). The trunk can have a diameter up to 25 centimeters (10 inches). The flowers are pink, with a pleasant scent. The fruits are up to 3 cm (1 1/4 in) in diameter, and have an aromatic scent and a pear-like shape; yellow-green in color, with some red when ripe.

== Taxonomy ==
The following two varieties are known:

- Malus angustifolia var. angustifolia
- Malus angustifolia var. puberula (Rehder) Rehder

== Distribution and habitat ==
The species can be found from Florida west to eastern Texas and north to New Jersey, Pennsylvania, Illinois and Missouri.

M. angustifolia prefers habitats that are moist but well-drained. For inflorescence to occur, full sunlight is required. The species has been observed in habitat types such as dry hammocks, xeric flatwoods, mesic woodlands, floodplains, and pine woods.

== Ecology ==
The fruits are eaten by various wildlife.

== Uses ==
Although the fruits are astringent, acidic, and unpalatable when raw, they can be used to make jellies, jams, and food preserves.

The tree is grown as an ornamental plant.
