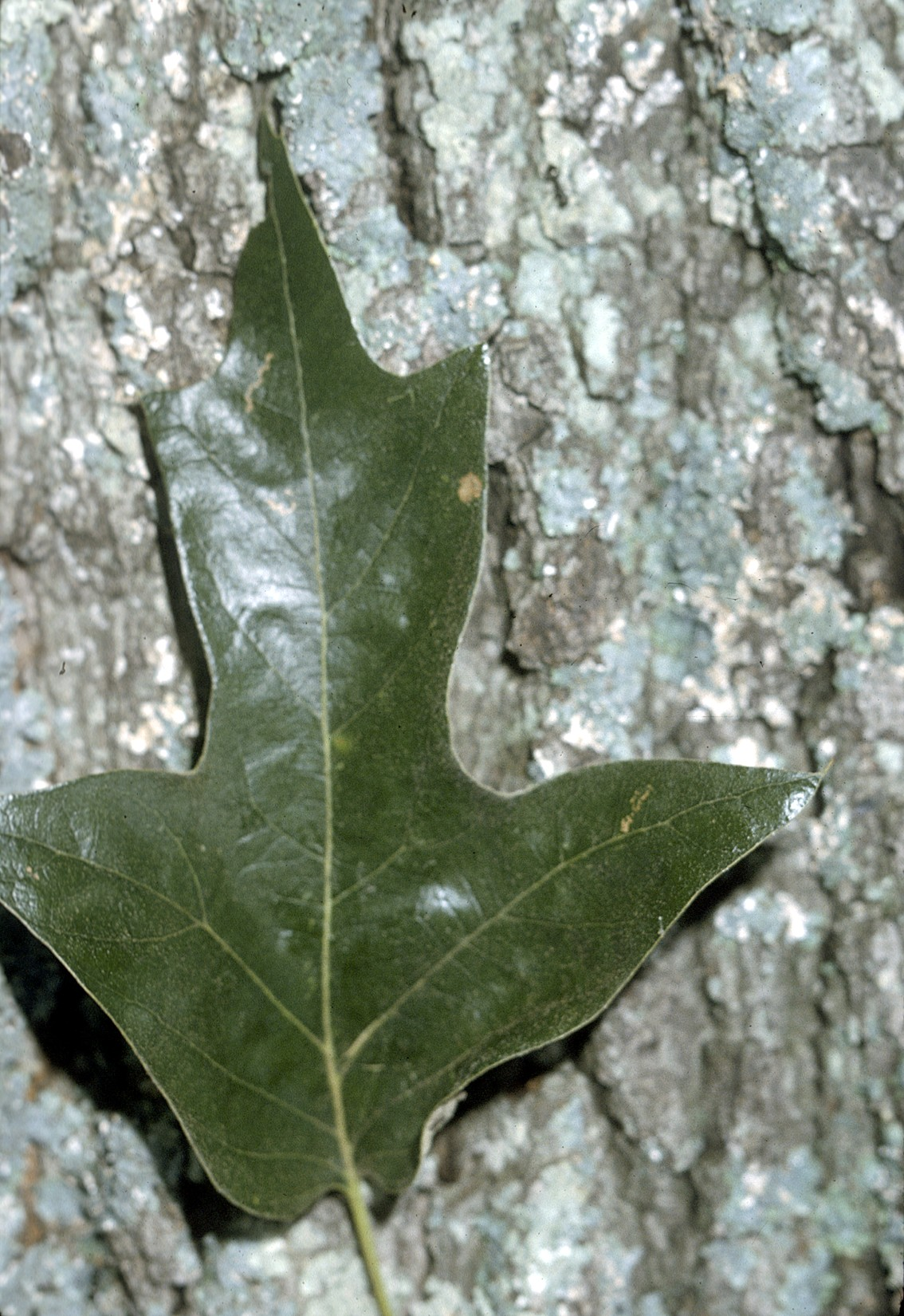
- Leaf and bark

Conservation status
- Least Concern (IUCN 3.1)

- Secure (NatureServe)

Scientific classification
- Kingdom: Plantae
- Clade: Tracheophytes
- Clade: Angiosperms
- Clade: Eudicots
- Clade: Rosids
- Order: Fagales
- Family: Fagaceae
- Genus: Quercus
- Subgenus: Quercus subg. Quercus
- Section: Quercus sect. Lobatae
- Species: Q. falcata

Binomial name
- Quercus falcata Michx.
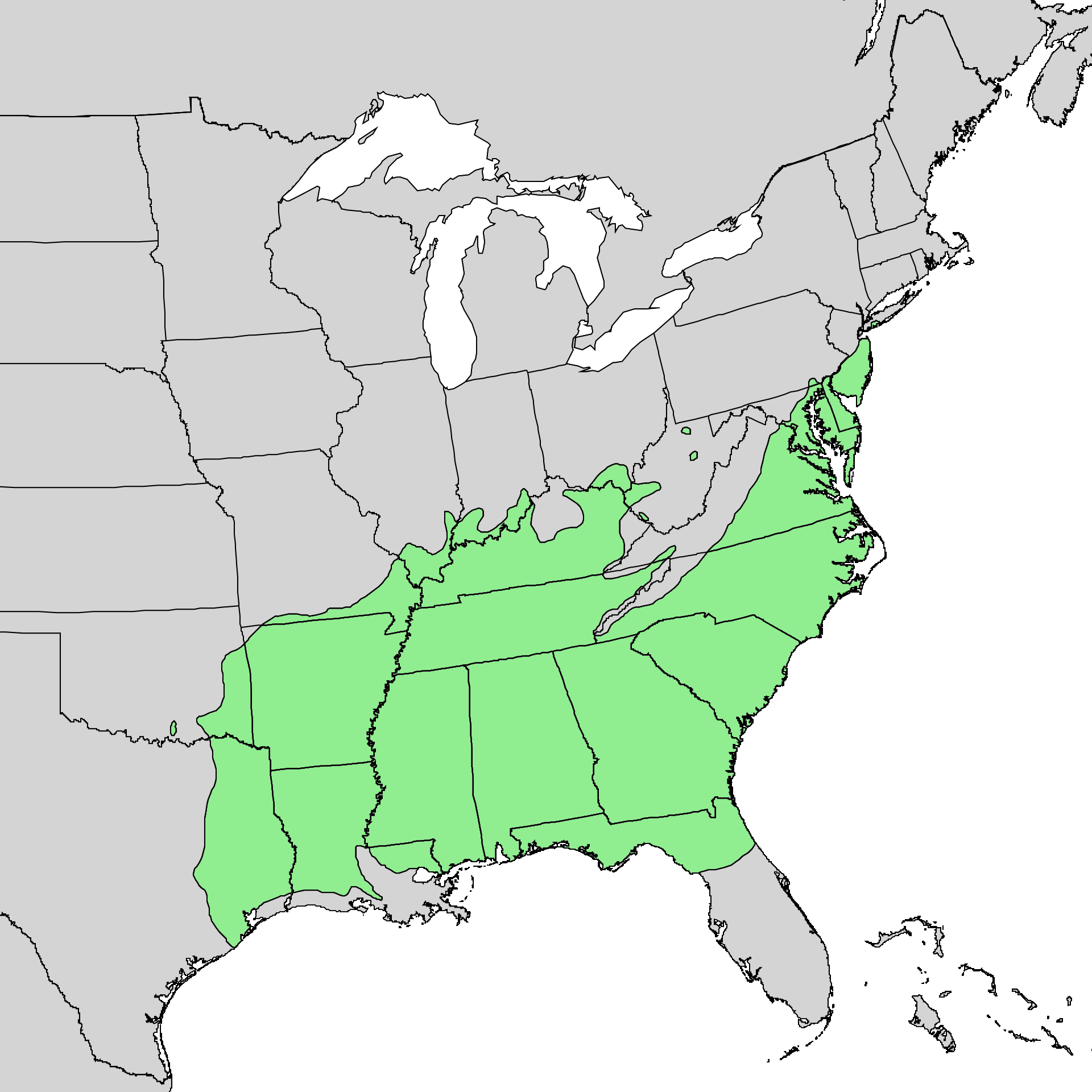

Synonyms
- List: Quercus aurea Raf.; Quercus digitata Sudw.; Quercus elongata Muhl.; Quercus hudsoniana Dippel; Quercus hypophlaeos Petz. & G.Kirchn.; Quercus nobilis K.Koch; Quercus triloba Michx.

= Quercus falcata =

Southern red oak

Species of oak tree

Quercus falcata, also called southern red oak, spanish oak, bottomland red oak or three-lobed red oak is an oak (part of the genus Quercus). Native to the Southern United States, it gets its name the "Spanish oak" as these are the areas of early Spanish colonies, while "southern red oak" comes from both its range and leaf color during late summer and fall. The southern red oak is a deciduous angiosperm, so has leaves that die after each growing period and come back in the next period of growth.

== Description ==
Quercus falcata is a medium to large-sized deciduous tree 25–30 meters (82–98 feet) tall, with a few forest grown specimens on highly productive sites reaching 35–44 m (115–144 ft), with a trunk up to 1.5 m (5 ft) in diameter, the crown with a broad, round-topped head.

The leaves are 10–30 centimetres (4–12 inches) long and 6–16 cm (2 1/4–6 1/4 in) wide, with 3 to 5 sharply pointed, often curved, bristle-tipped lobes, the central lobe long and narrow; the small number of long, narrow lobes is diagnostic, readily distinguishing southern red oak from other red oaks. The base of the leaf is distinctly rounded into an inverted bell shape and often lopsided. They are dark green and shiny above, and rusty and hairy below, particularly along the midrib and veins.

The seed is a short acorn 9–16 millimetres (11/32–5/8 in) long, bright orange-brown, enclosed for one-third to half of its length in a flat cup. The acorn matures at the end of its second season. The bark is dark brownish gray with narrow, shallow ridges.

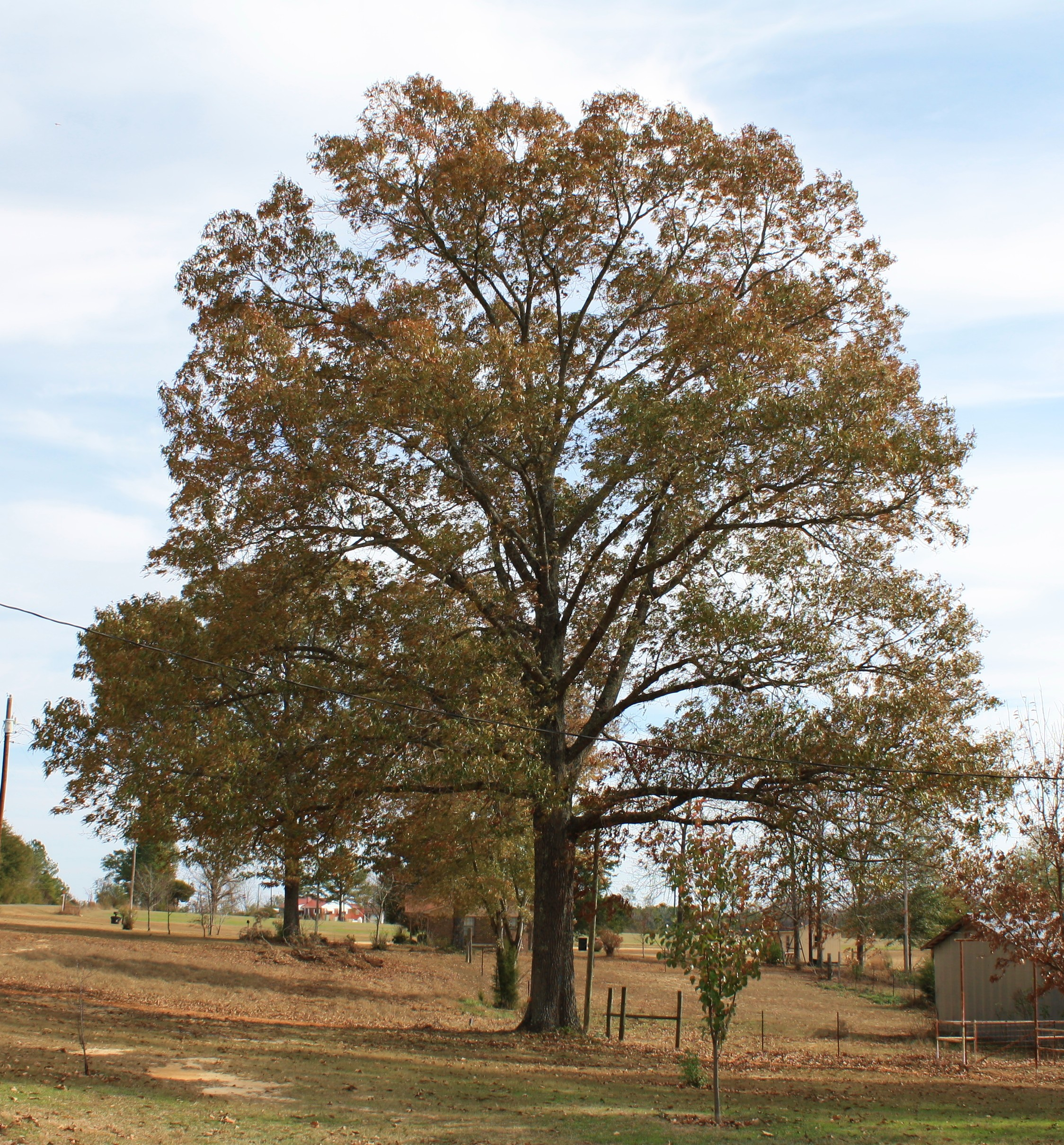
A mature tree in Marengo County, Alabama

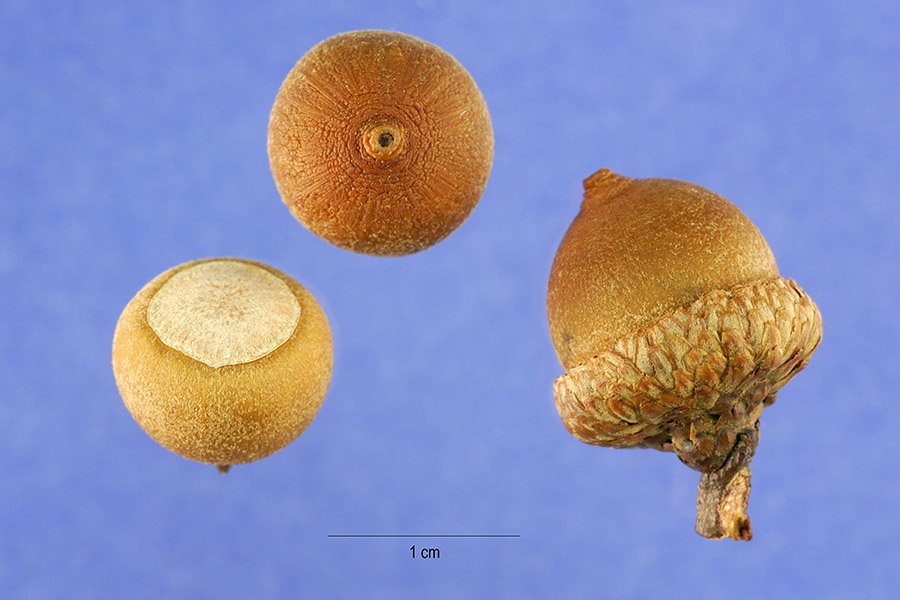
Acorns

=== Famous specimens ===
Queen Anne's County Oak is a southern red oak on record as the largest southern red oak in Queen Anne's County, Maryland. The oak was located on Romancoke Road. It fell on July 23, 2017, due to a tornado. The tree was at least 200 years old, stood 20 m (66 ft) tall, and had a 31.2 m (102 ft) spread.

== Taxonomy ==
The southern red oak is a member of the beech family (Fagaceae) and 1 of the 207 oak species in the U.S., and is in the section of the Quercus genus Lobatae, the red oaks. Quercus falcata has the following synonyms: Quercus aurea, Q. digitate, Q. elongate, Q. hudsoniana, Q. hypophlaeos, Q. nobilis and Q. triloba. Q. falcata was described in 1801 by Andre Michaux. Several southern red oak hybrids have been described including Quercus × caesariensis (Q. falcata × Quercus ilicifolia) and Quercus × beaumontiana (Q. falcata × Quercus laurifolia).

=== Etymology ===
Quercus, is Latin for "oak" and followed by the specific epithet, falcata, which in Latin means "sickle-shaped" in reference to the shape of the lobes that are present on their leaves.

== Distribution and habitat ==
Quercus falcata occurs in sandy, loamy or clay soils of upland sites. These soils are often dry, acidic and nutrient poor. In suitable habitats, the species can be found from southern New York (Long Island) south to central Florida and west to Missouri, Oklahoma, and Texas. In the northeastern portion of its range the species is relatively rare and found almost exclusively along the coast; its highest prevalence is throughout the piedmont region of the Southeast.

== Ecology ==
Southern red oak has been reported to form occasional hybrids with several other red oaks in the region.

The southern red oak is susceptible to damage as a result of its relatively thin bark. This thinner bark means that fire can easily damage the trees in the form of fire scars and other damage. Bark roughness increases in xeric sites compared to mesic ones potentially an adaptation to fire frequency. The seedlings of southern red oak can survive prescribed fire in winter. The harm caused by fire can leave the tree vulnerable to heart rot.

When exposed to the fungi, Ceratocystis fagacearum, the southern red oak (along with other oak species) will suffer from wilting of leaves, reducing rate of photosynthesis to such a low level that mortality can occur. Fungi invades xylem via infected water, blocking the vessels and prevents normal flow of water up through the tree. This fungus can cause the wilting of oak leaves and eventual death. Oak wilt does not currently appear to be damaging the population, but with the Southern Red Oak being seen as a species of major importance to ecosystems, efforts to prevent oak wilt are being taken. In attempts to manage oak wilt, an integrated approach is adopted, combining root disruption, sanitation, and chemical application to tackle the issue. The goal of root disruption is to prevent any infected trees coming into contact with those that are healthy by root grafts. This means putting trenches, plow line or even a barrier to prevent roots of infected trees coming into contact of those that are healthy. Sanitation measures focus on removing the source of potential spread of disease, the trees that are infected. This can mean just removal of individuals who were infected or even removal of all trees that fall within the infection centre. Finally, there are chemical applications that involve application of fungicides to healthy individuals to prevent them becoming infected, or a therapeutic fungicide that cannot cure the tree but reduces intensity and onset of symptoms. Often the fungicide propiconazole is used.

== Cultivation ==
The southern red oak is cultivated in eastern United States in USDA Zone 5a to USDA Zone 9b. It can survive lows from −23 to −28.8 °C (−9.4 to −19.8 °F) and highs of 38 °C (100 °F).

== Uses ==
The southern red oak is a tree with diverse potential uses, such as for manufacturing of floors, furniture, construction materials and lumber thanks to the sturdy, durable and coarse-grained wood it provides. The southern red oak is vital in the southeastern United States due to its abundance, providing around 8.1% of annual hardwood volume. Southern red oak wood is used as a fuel source because of its high heat value. The southern red oak provides tannin, which is used to preserve and treat leather. The southern red oak has a large root system that provides watershed protection to reduce flood damage and soil stability. Other uses for southern red oak include as shade trees and aesthetic uses in gardens. Southern red oak can provide acorn mast for deer, squirrels, turkeys, song birds and quail.
