= A. chinensis =

A. chinensis may refer to:

- Aesculus chinensis, the Chinese horse chestnut, a tree species found in eastern Asia
- Anemone chinensis, one of the 50 fundamental herbs used in traditional Chinese medicine

== See also ==
- Chinensis (disambiguation)
