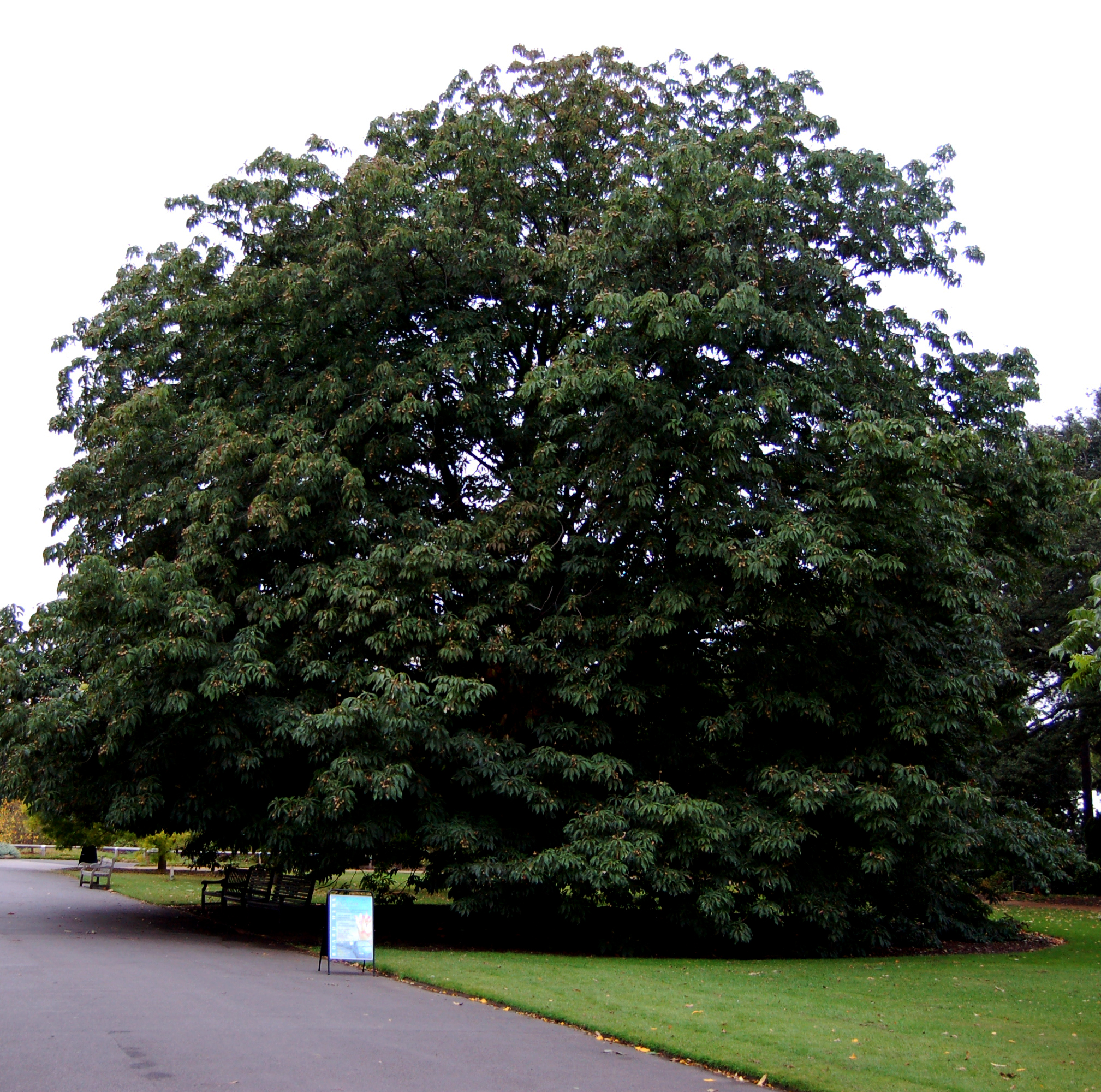
- Aesculus indica, Indian horse chestnut at RBG Kew
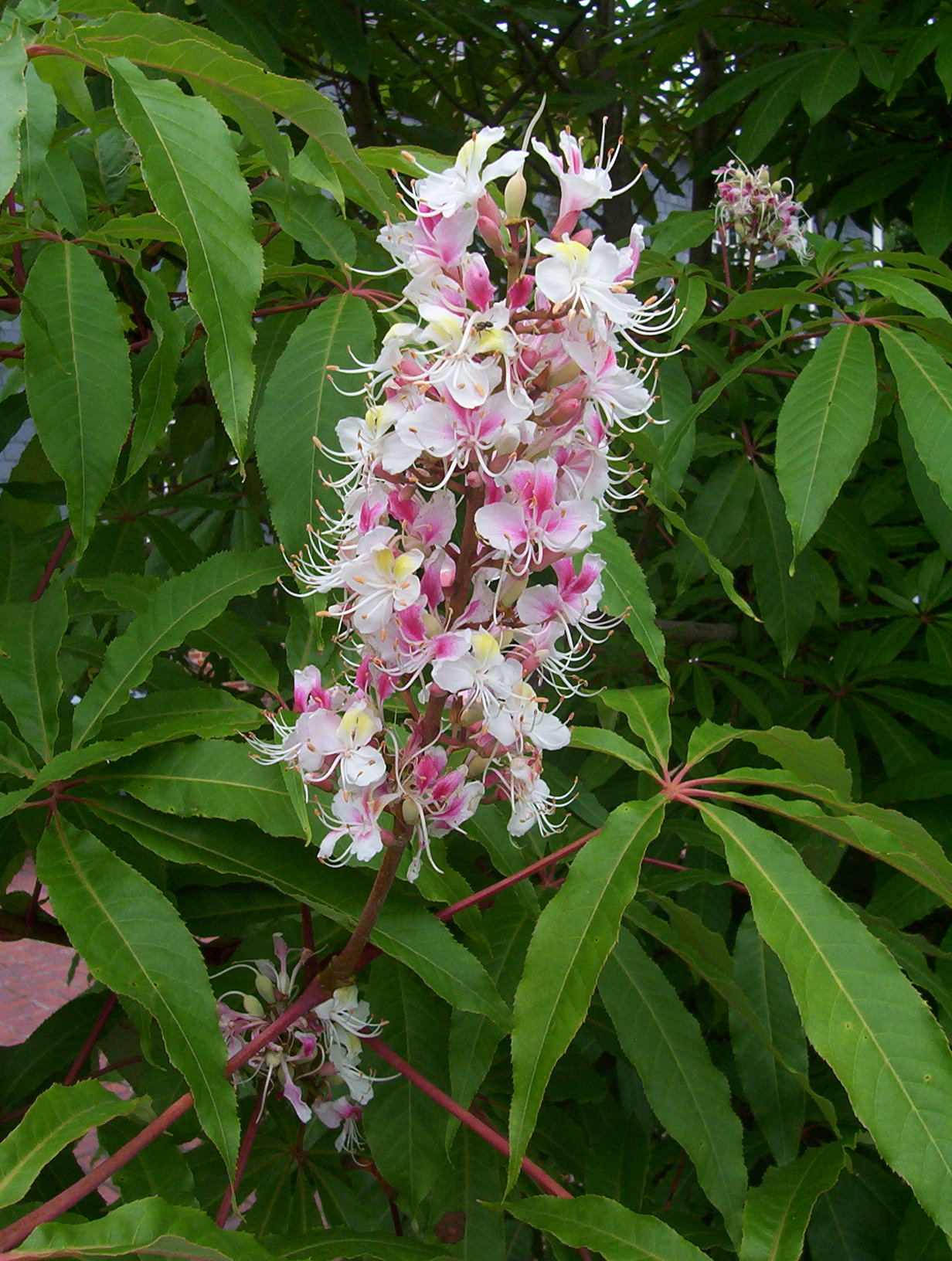

Conservation status
- Least Concern (IUCN 3.1)

Scientific classification
- Kingdom: Plantae
- Clade: Tracheophytes
- Clade: Angiosperms
- Clade: Eudicots
- Clade: Rosids
- Order: Sapindales
- Family: Sapindaceae
- Genus: Aesculus
- Species: A. indica

Binomial name
- Aesculus indica (Wall. ex Cambess.) Hook.

Synonyms
- Pavia indica Wall. ex Cambess. Pavia indica Royle; Pawia indica Kuntze

= Aesculus indica =

Species of plant

Aesculus indica, commonly known as the Indian horse-chestnut or Himalayan horse chestnut, is a species of deciduous broad-leaved tree in the family Sapindaceae.

== Description ==
Aesculus indica is a tree growing to 9–12 m (30–40 ft) with a spread of about 11–15 m (35–50 ft). It is hardy to −18 °C (0 °F), USDA zones 7–9. It is in flower from June to July, and the seeds ripen in October. The flowers are hermaphroditic and with plentiful white blossoms during May and June pollinated by bees. Its large leaves 10–20 cm (3.9–7.9 in) long by 2–6 cm (0.79–2.36 in) wide are also ornamental and the mature tree forms a round canopy.

== Distribution ==
It is common along the Himalayan Lowlands, between Kashmir and Western Nepal at elevations between 900 and 3,000 metres. In the British Isles it is popular in many parks and estates where it was introduced in the mid-19th century. It is also found in many parts of the US. The commercial collection of its seeds for flour production seems to have impacted on the natural distribution of this species.

== Uses ==
Its leaves are used as cattle fodder in parts of Northern India. Its seeds are dried and ground into a bitter flour, called tattawakher. The bitterness is caused by saponins, which are rinsed out by thoroughly washing the flour during its preparation. The flour is often mixed with wheat flour to make chapatis and also to make a halwa (Indian sweetmeat) and sometimes is served as a dalia, (a type of porridge or gruel) during fasting periods.

It is used in traditional Indian medicine for the treatment of various skin diseases and rheumatism, as well as functioning as an astringent, acrid, and narcotic. Additionally, it is employed to alleviate headaches.

Its large leaves and flowers make it suitable for use as large-sized bonsai.

In the UK, the cultivar 'Sydney Pearce'' has gained the Royal Horticultural Society's Award of Garden Merit.
