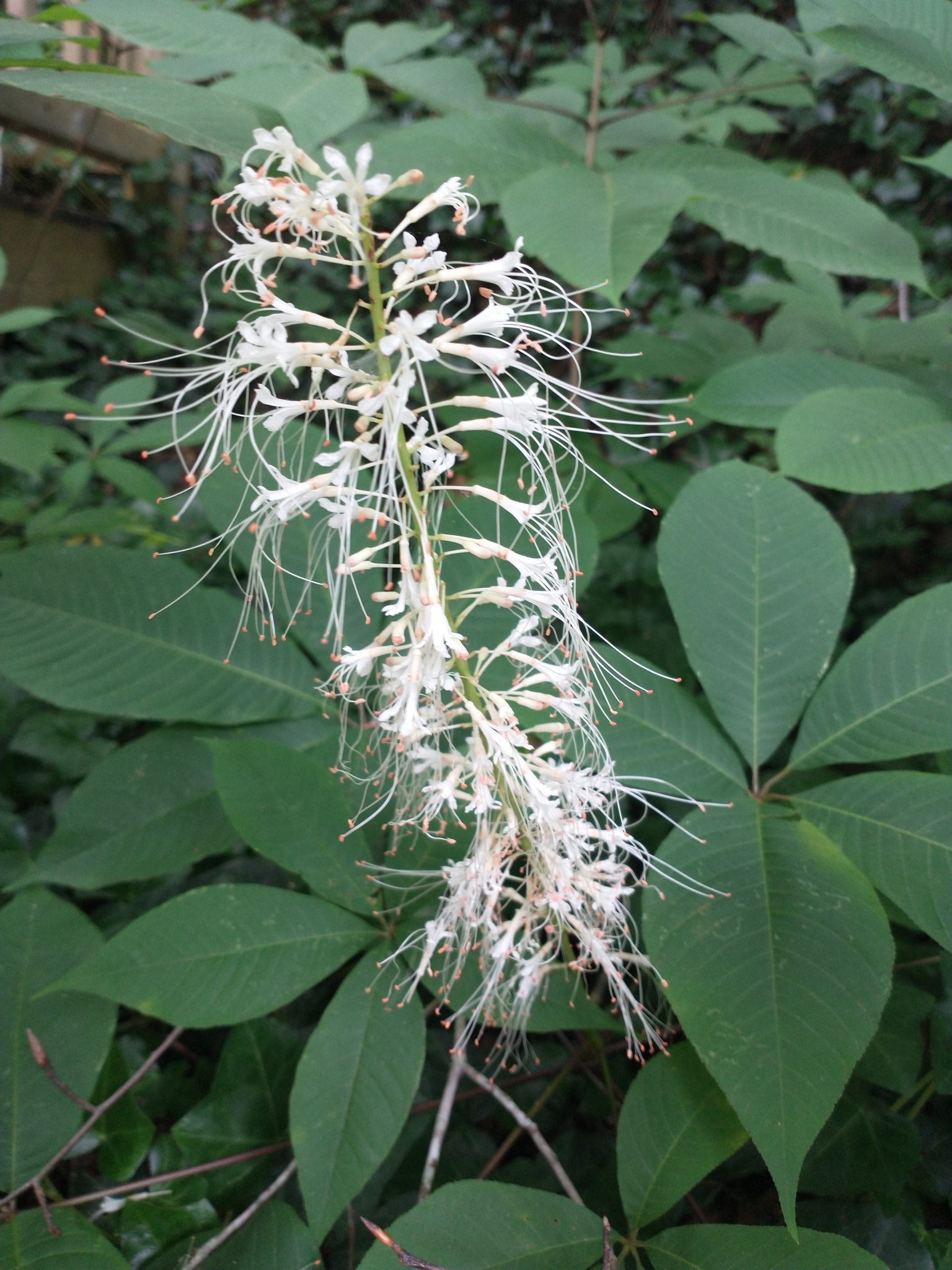
- Aesculus parviflora growing wild near Irondale, Alabama

Conservation status
- Least Concern (IUCN 3.1)

- Vulnerable (NatureServe)

Scientific classification
- Kingdom: Plantae
- Clade: Tracheophytes
- Clade: Angiosperms
- Clade: Eudicots
- Clade: Rosids
- Order: Sapindales
- Family: Sapindaceae
- Genus: Aesculus
- Species: A. parviflora

Binomial name
- Aesculus parviflora Walt. 1788
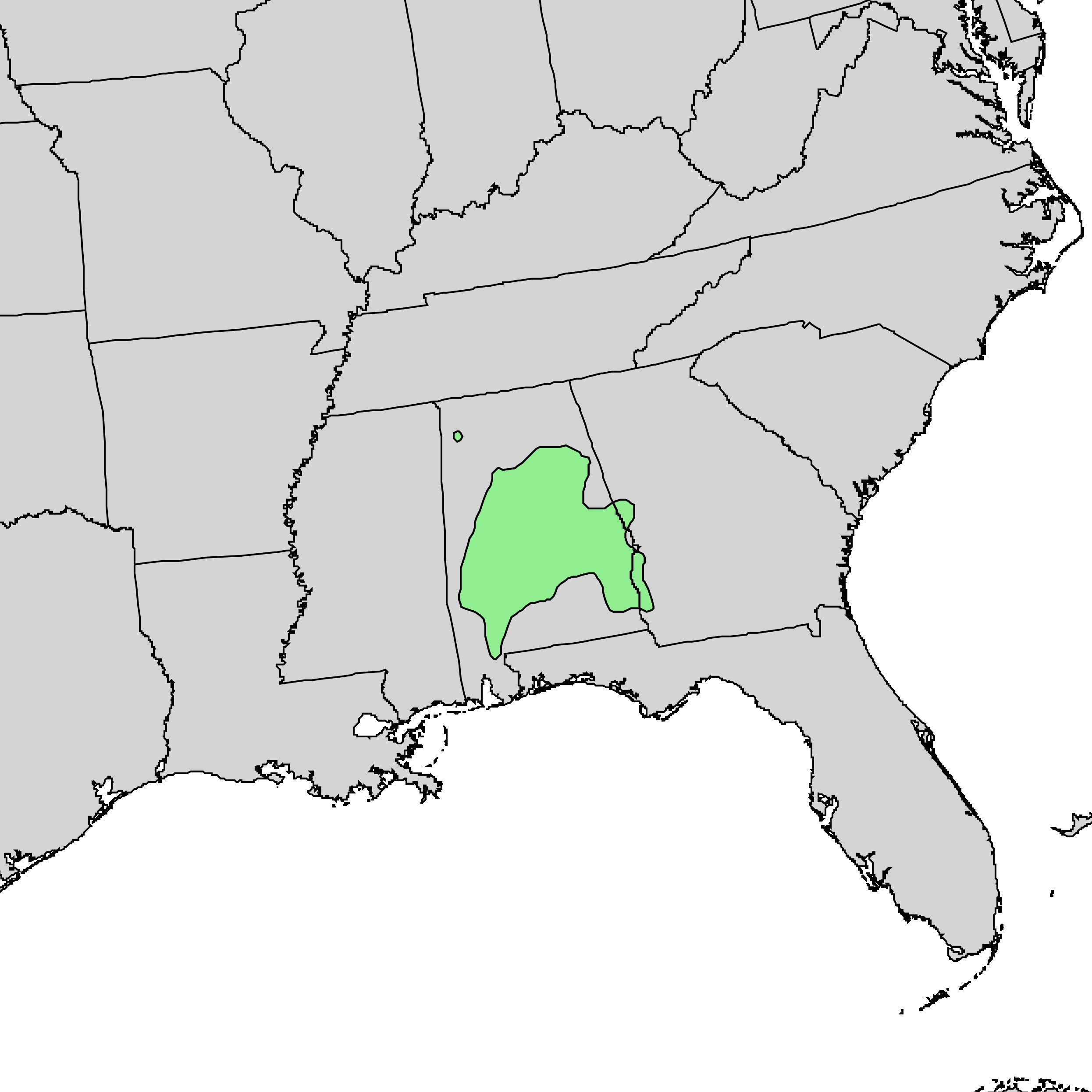
- Generalized natural range

Synonyms
- Synonymy: Aesculus alba (Poir.) Raf.; Aesculus macrostachya Michx.; Aesculus macrostachys Pers.; Aesculus odorata F.Dietr.; Aesculus parviflora f. serotina Rehder; Macrothyrsus discolor Spach; Macrothyrsus odorata Raf.; Nebropsis alba (Poir.) Raf.; Pavia alba Poir.; Pavia edulis Poit.; Pavia macrostachys Loisel.; Pavia parviflora Raf.; Pawia parviflora Kuntze

= Aesculus parviflora =

Bottlebrush buckeye

Species of tree

Aesculus parviflora, the bottlebrush buckeye or small-flowered buckeye, is a species of suckering deciduous shrub in the family Sapindaceae. It is native to the southeastern United States, where it is found primarily in Alabama, locally in western Georgia, and with a disjunct population in South Carolina along the Savannah River. Its natural habitat is in mesic forests, on bluffs and in ravines.

This plant is moderately poisonous to humans if eaten. Symptoms include depression, muscle weakness, paralysis, vomiting, and diarrhea; the nuts, being of attractive appearance, are the most likely part to cause poisoning. It has also been reported to be toxic to pets.

== Description ==
Aesculus parviflora grows to 2–4 m tall. The leaves are arranged in opposite pairs, palmately compound with 5-7 leaflets, each leaflet short-stalked, 12–22 cm long and 5–10 cm broad, with an entire margin. The flowers are produced in conspicuous erect panicles 20–50 cm long resembling a traditional bottle brush, each flower with a tubular calyx, small white petals, and several protruding 3–4 cm long stamens. The flowers give way to pear-shaped capsules containing polished, brown seeds.

The Latin specific epithet parviflora means "small-flowered".

== Cultivation and uses ==
Aesculus parviflora is grown as an ornamental plant in gardens, where its August flowering attracts butterflies. It prefers moist, well-drained soils in part shade to full shade. In the US, it is suitable for USDA hardiness zones 4–8.

The naturalist, explorer and plant collector William Bartram first noted this undescribed shrub on his travels through Carolina, Georgia and Florida in 1773–78. An old example was still to be found in Bartram's Garden, Philadelphia, in 1930.

Aesculus parviflora was introduced to British horticulture through the activities of John Fraser, who made his first botanizing trip through the American South in 1785. Fraser's finds were distributed among English nurserymen like Lee and Kennedy or Loddiges or to private patrons, and the shrub was "to be met with in most of our nurseries" by 1820. This plant has gained the Royal Horticultural Society's Award of Garden Merit.

== Gallery ==
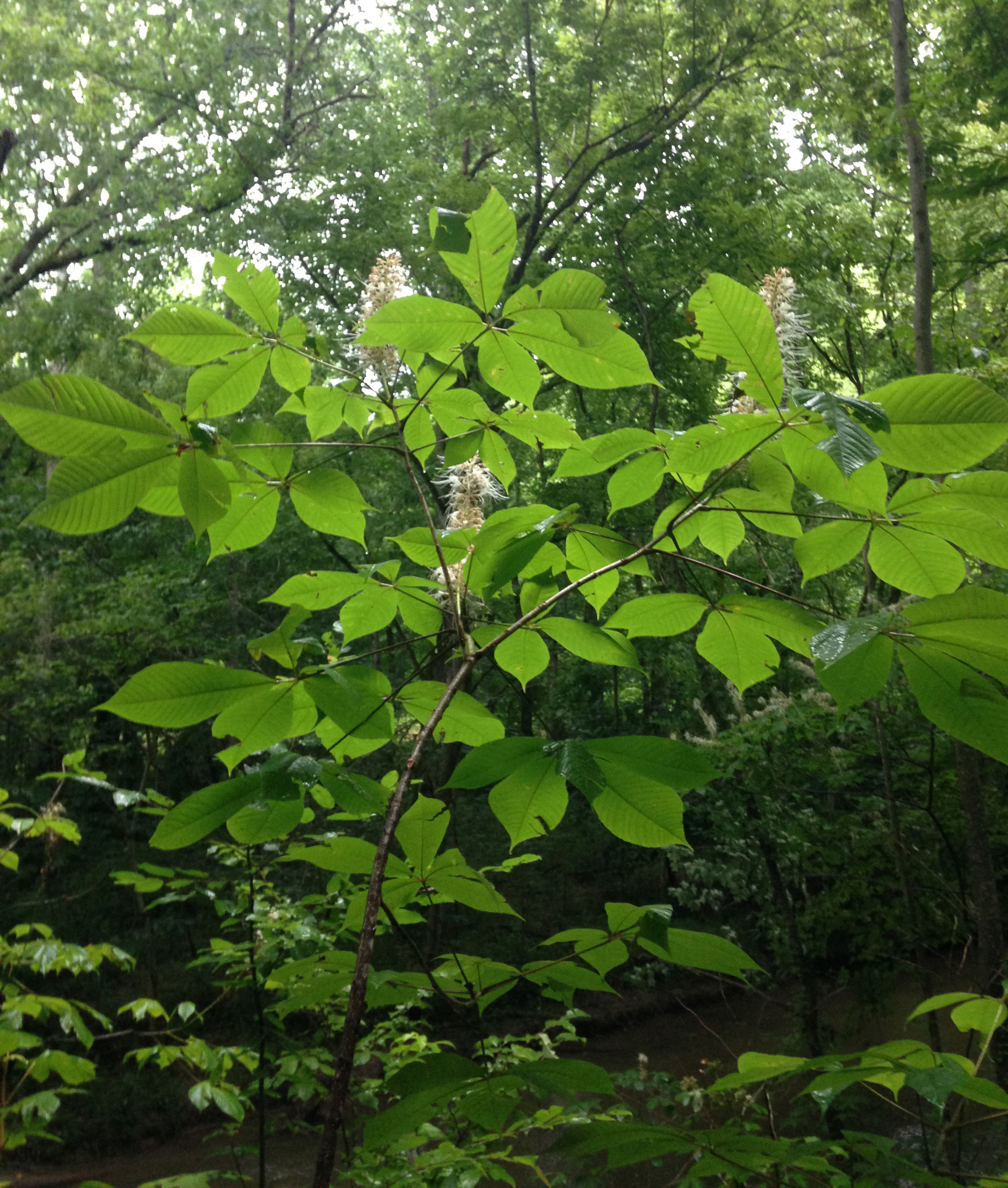
Growing wild, by Little Canoe Creek, Alabama

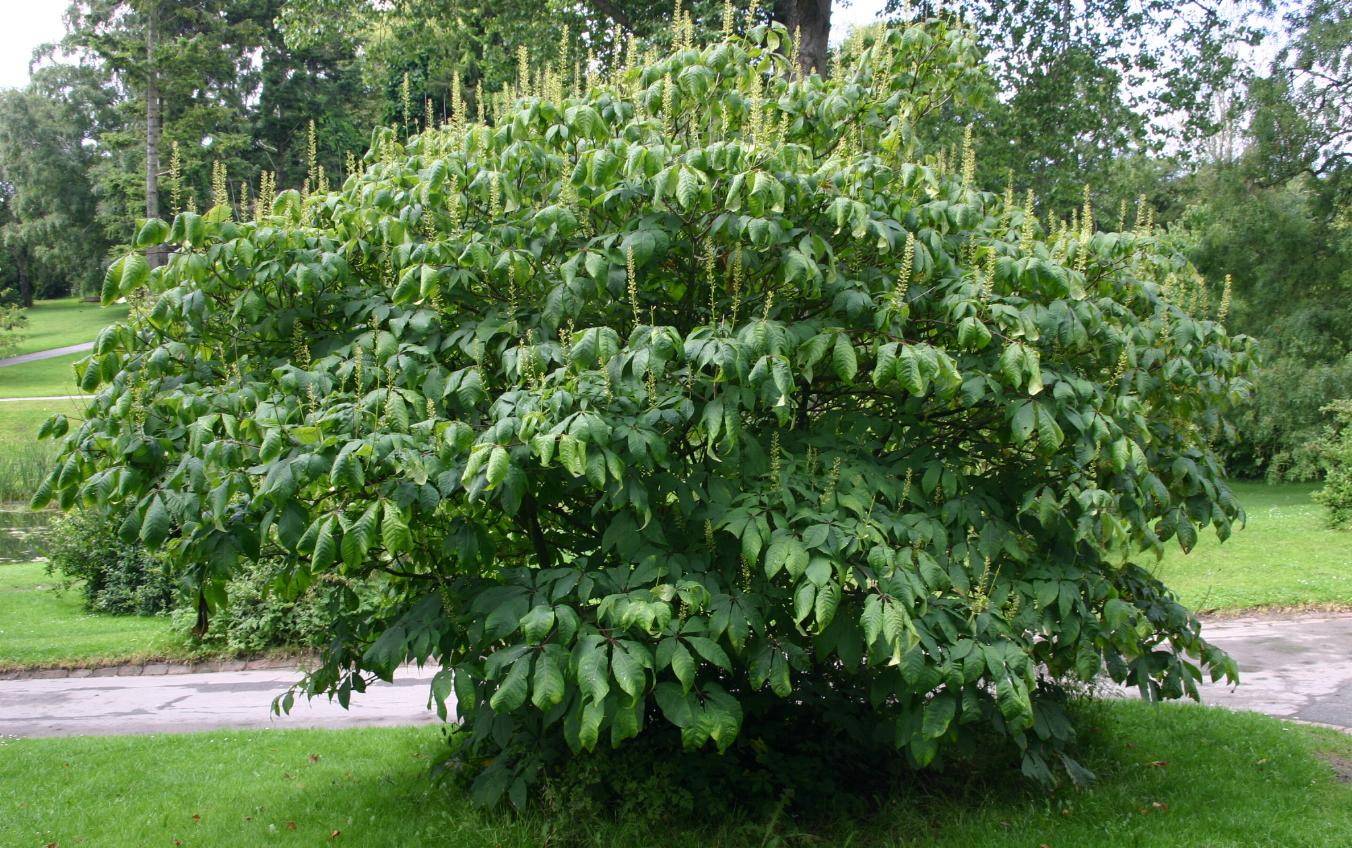
Cultivated shrub

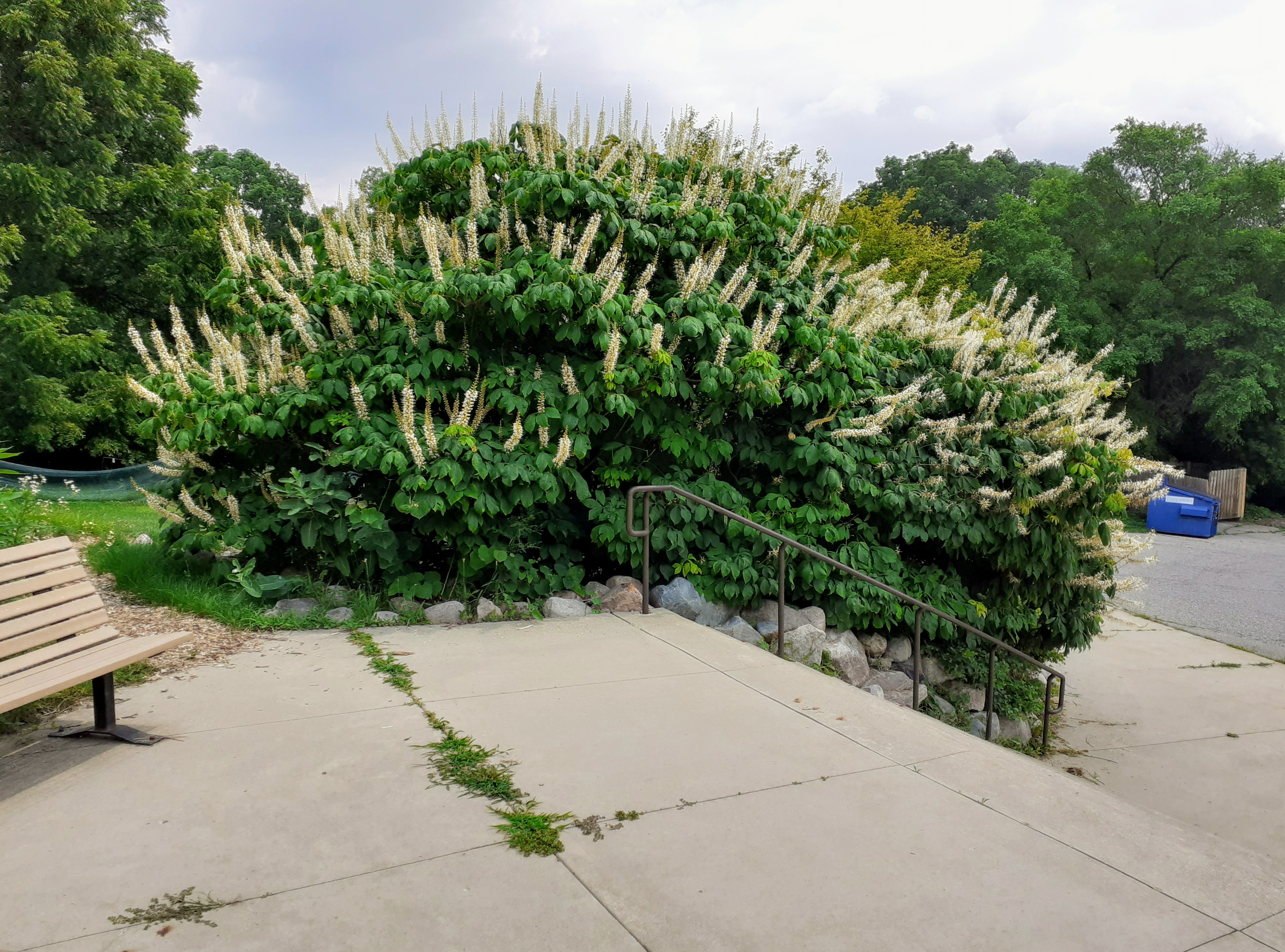
Cultivated shrub

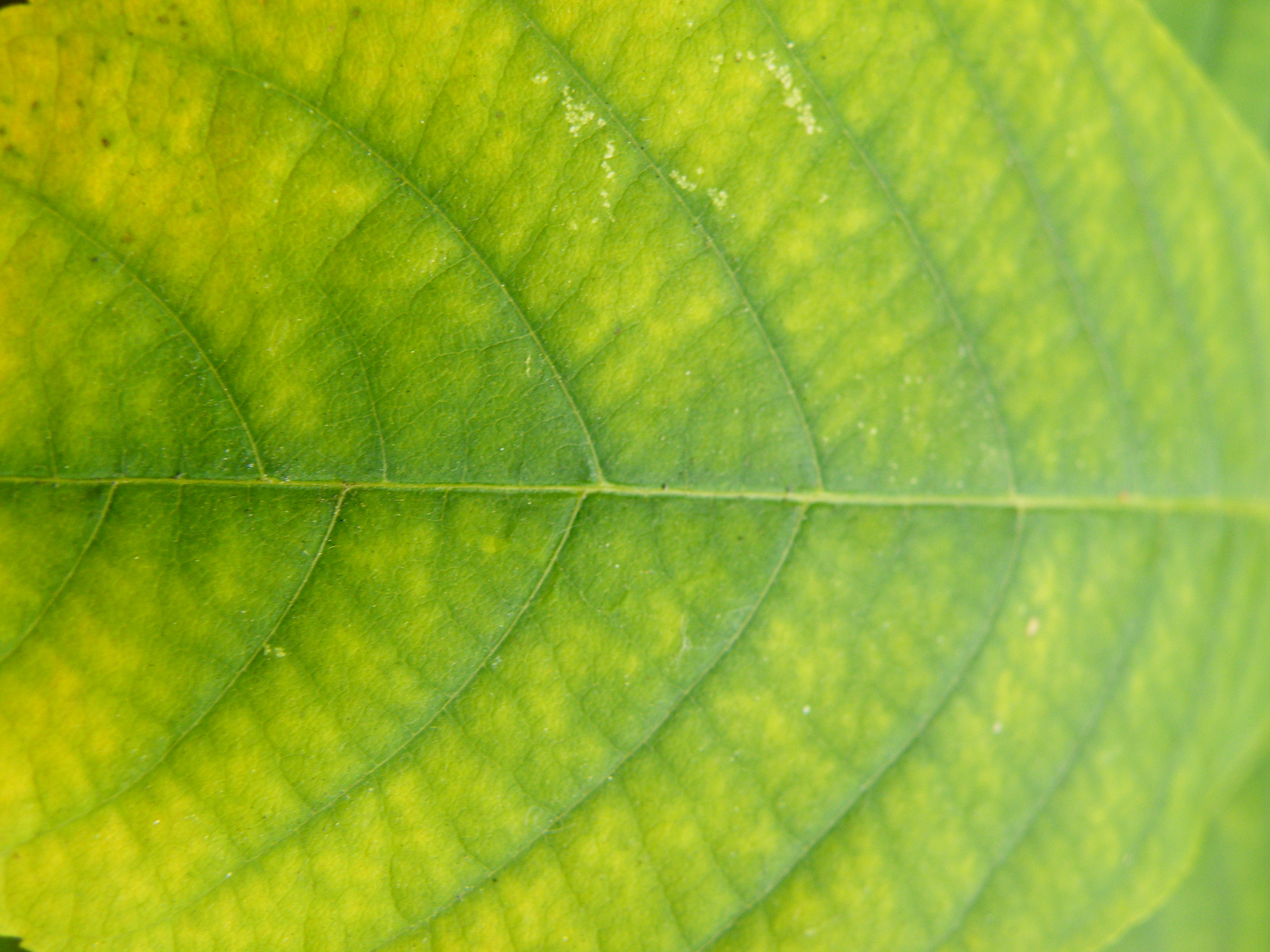
Leaf nervature

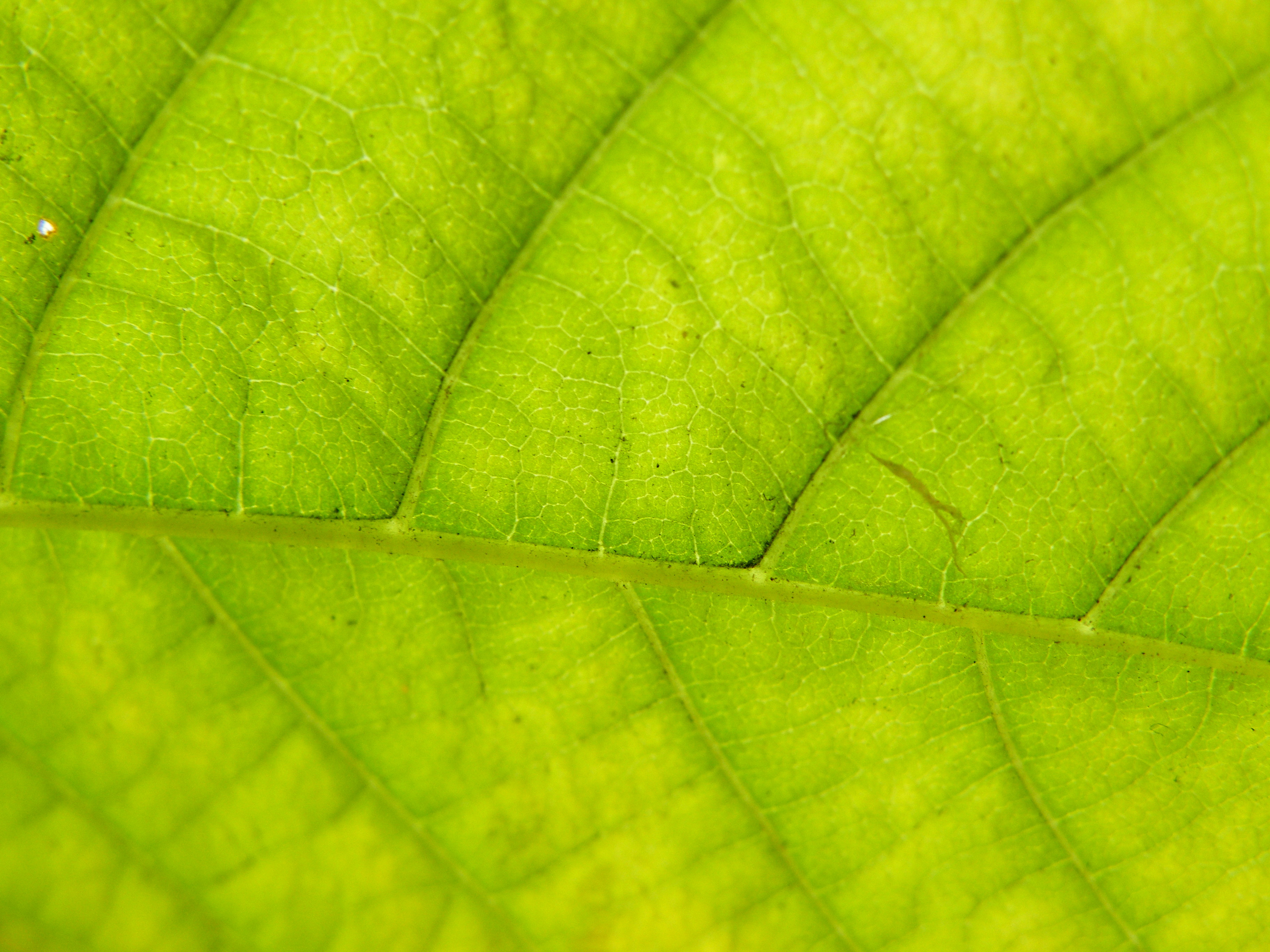
Leaf nervature

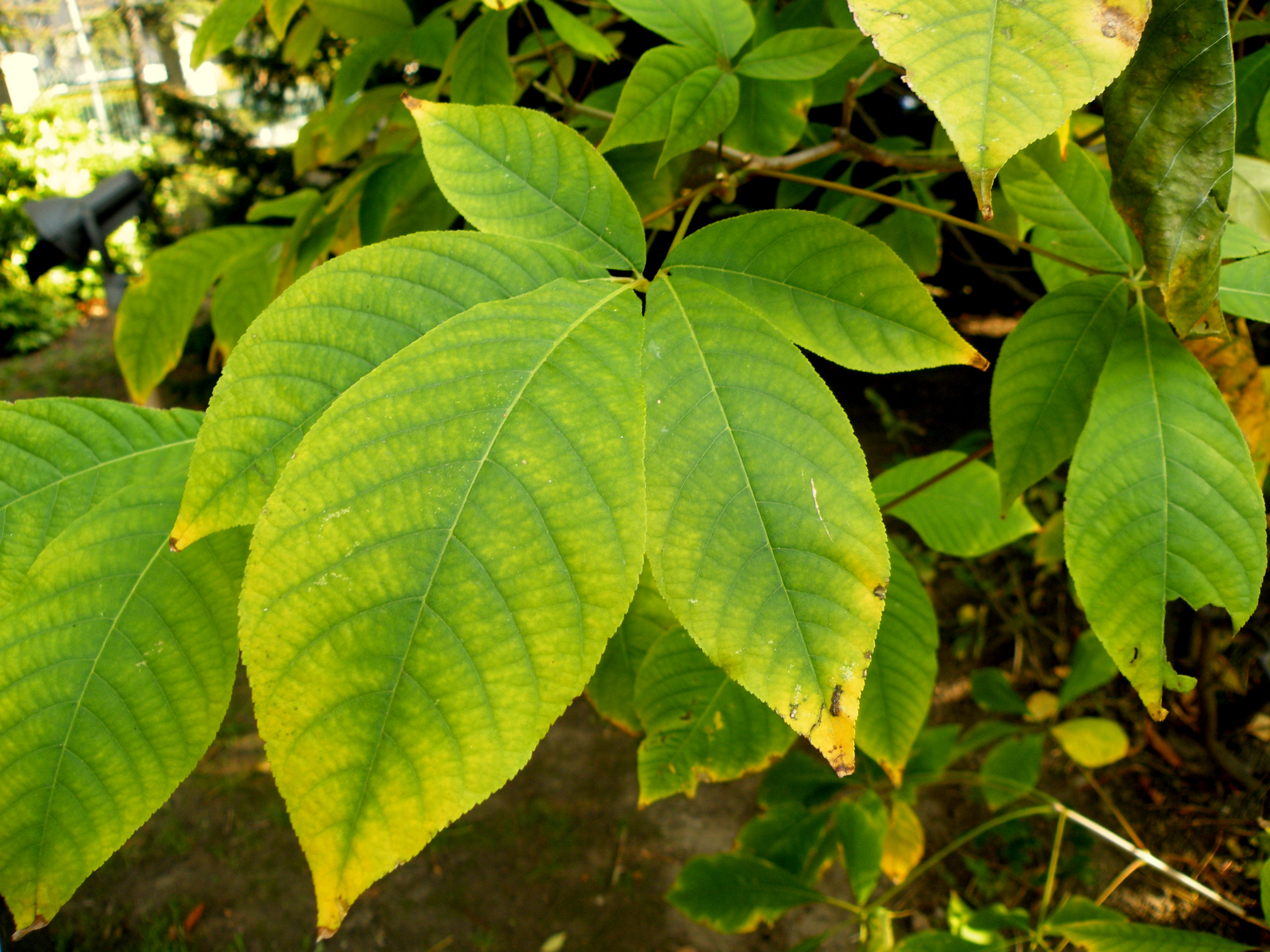
