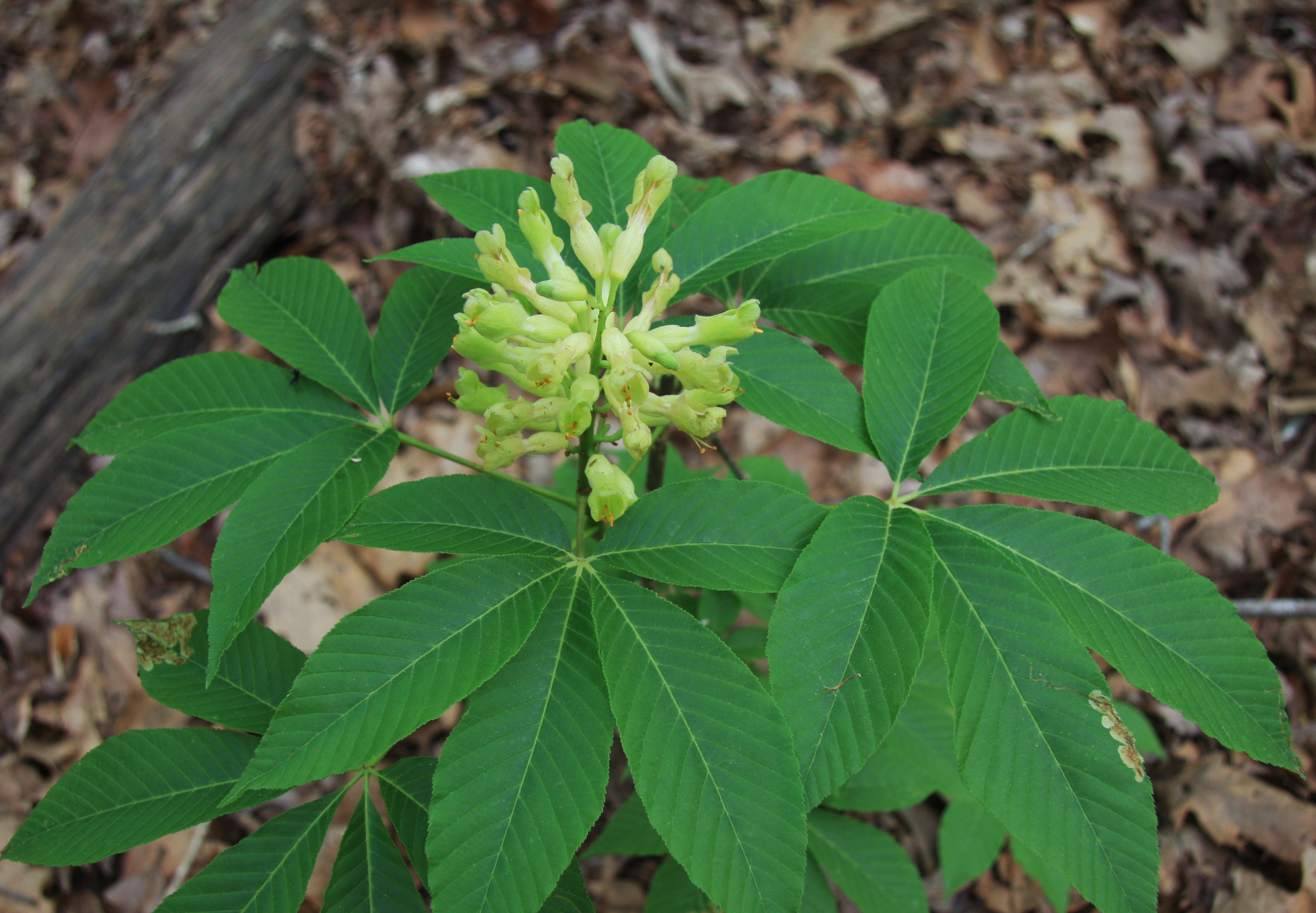
- Aesculus sylvatica inflorescence

Conservation status
- Least Concern (IUCN 3.1)

Scientific classification
- Kingdom: Plantae
- Clade: Tracheophytes
- Clade: Angiosperms
- Clade: Eudicots
- Clade: Rosids
- Order: Sapindales
- Family: Sapindaceae
- Genus: Aesculus
- Species: A. sylvatica

Binomial name
- Aesculus sylvatica L.
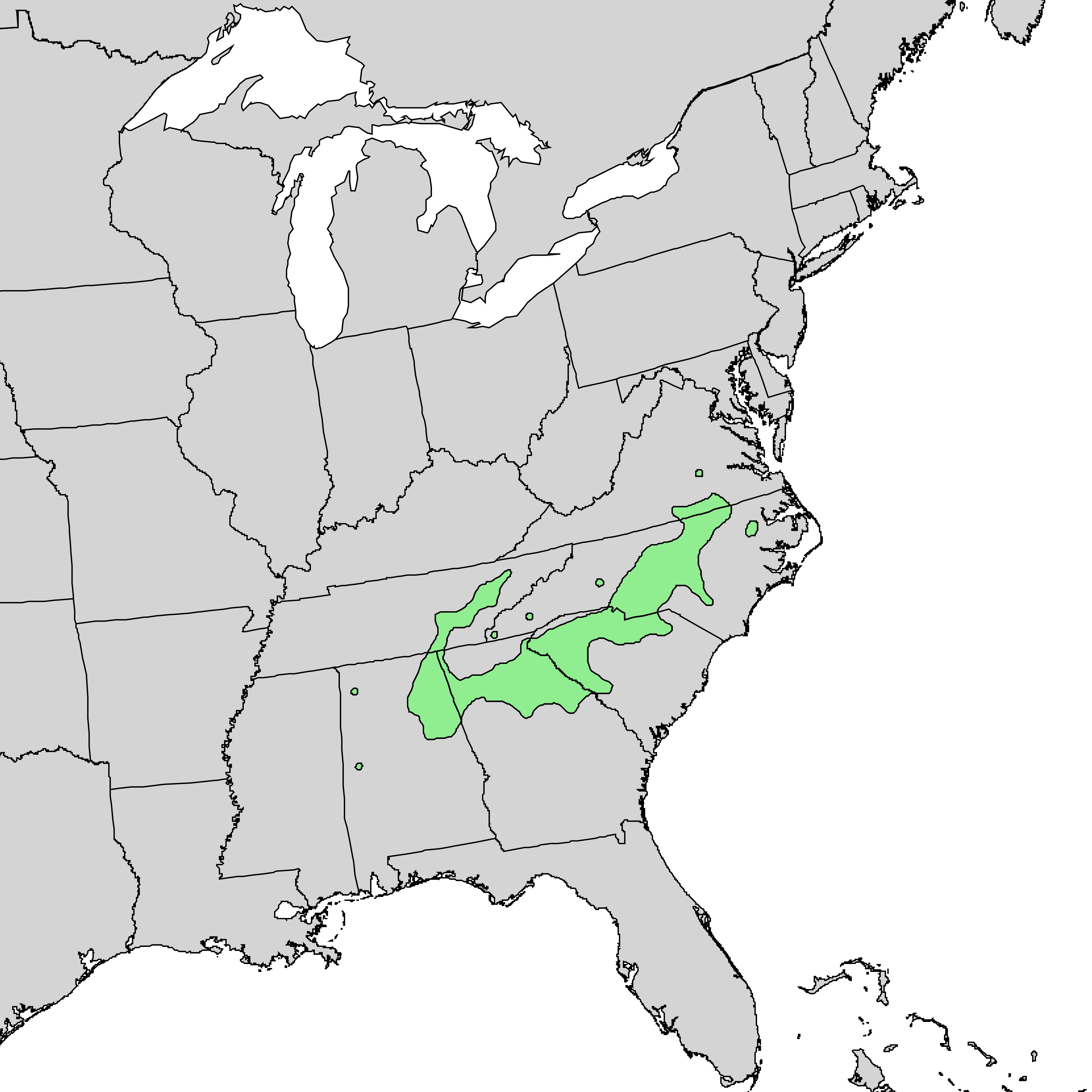
- Natural range of Aesculus sylvatica

= Aesculus sylvatica =

Painted buckeye

Species of plant

Aesculus sylvatica, the painted buckeye, is a species of shrub. The species has five leaflets that are 4.5 to 6 inches (11 to 15 cm) long and 1.5 to 2.5 inches (3.8 to 6.4 cm) wide. The flowers are yellow and occasionally have red also. The species have dry fruit and brown, scaly bark. The species is commonly found in forests and along stream banks. The shrub is poisonous, as are its seeds.
