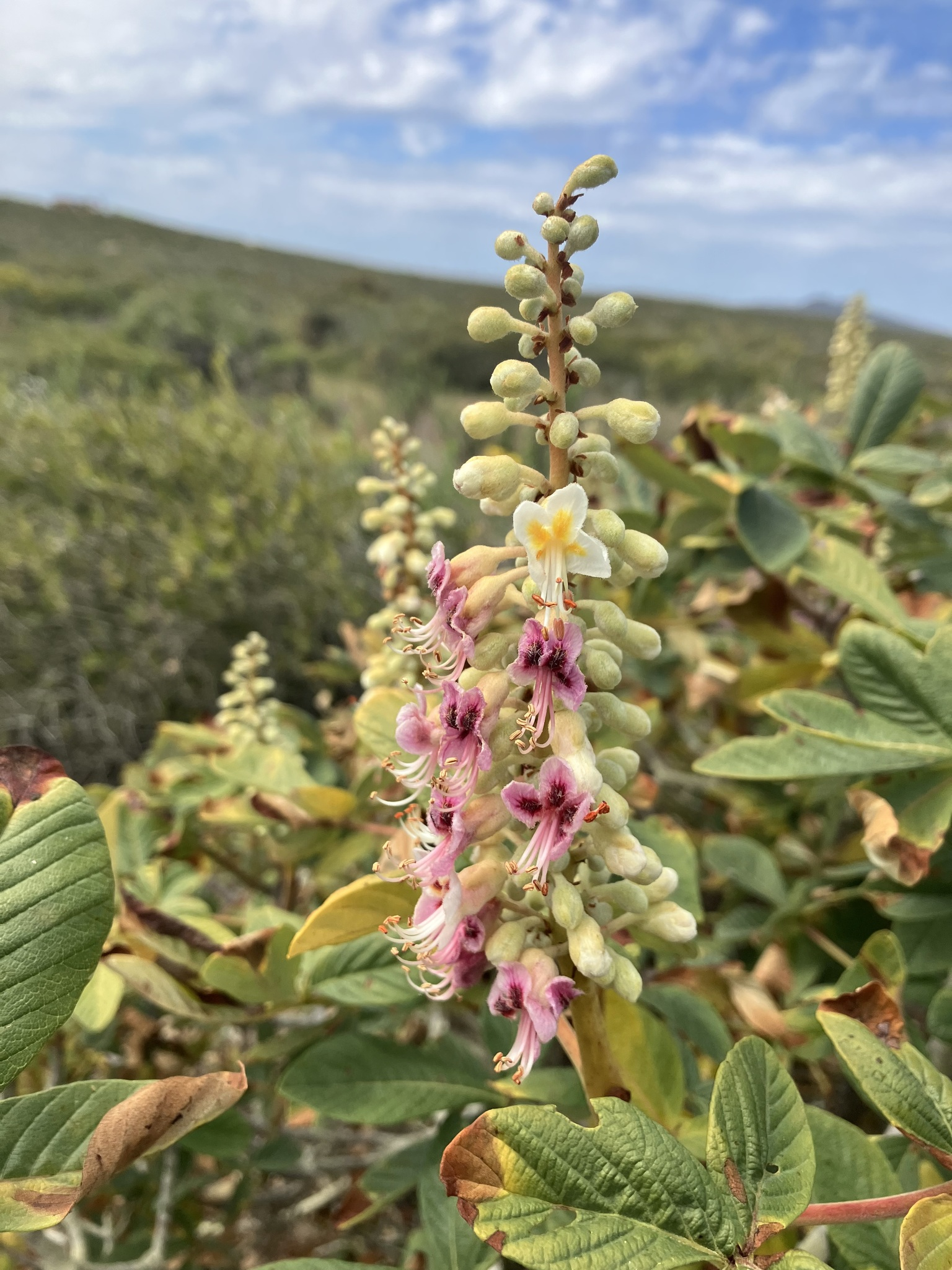
- Parry's buckeye at Campo La Chorera, near San Quintín, Baja California

Conservation status
- Near Threatened (IUCN 3.1)

Scientific classification
- Kingdom: Plantae
- Clade: Embryophytes
- Clade: Tracheophytes
- Clade: Spermatophytes
- Clade: Angiosperms
- Clade: Eudicots
- Clade: Rosids
- Order: Sapindales
- Family: Sapindaceae
- Genus: Aesculus
- Species: A. parryi

Binomial name
- Aesculus parryi A.Gray

Synonyms
- Pawiya parryi Kuntze

= Aesculus parryi =

Species of plant

Aesculus parryi, known as the Parry's buckeye or Baja California buckeye, is a species of shrub or small tree in the genus Aesculus. It is native to Mexico, specifically northwest Baja California.
