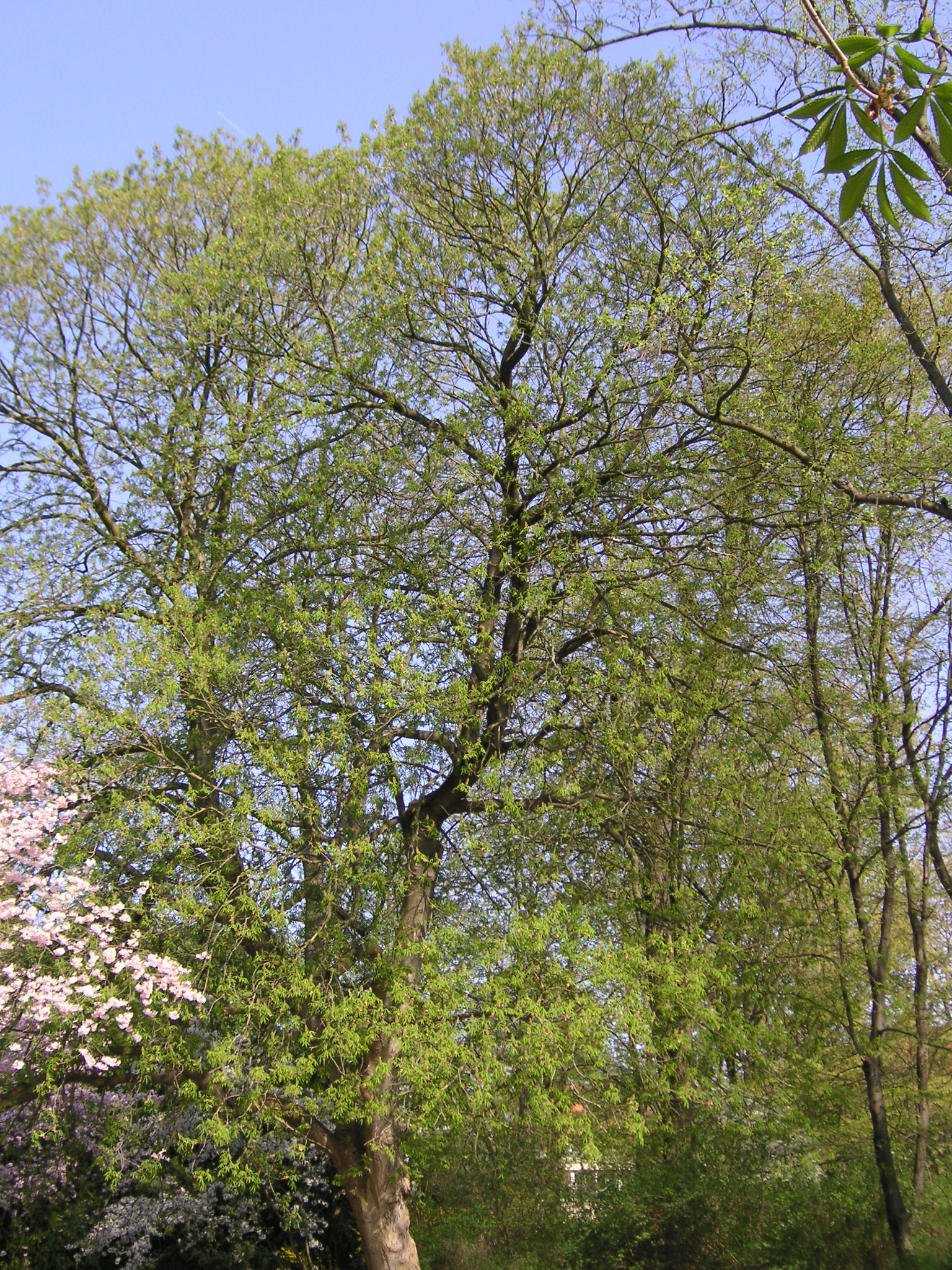

Conservation status
- Least Concern (IUCN 3.1)

Scientific classification
- Kingdom: Plantae
- Clade: Tracheophytes
- Clade: Angiosperms
- Clade: Eudicots
- Clade: Rosids
- Order: Sapindales
- Family: Sapindaceae
- Genus: Aesculus
- Species: A. flava

Binomial name
- Aesculus flava Sol.
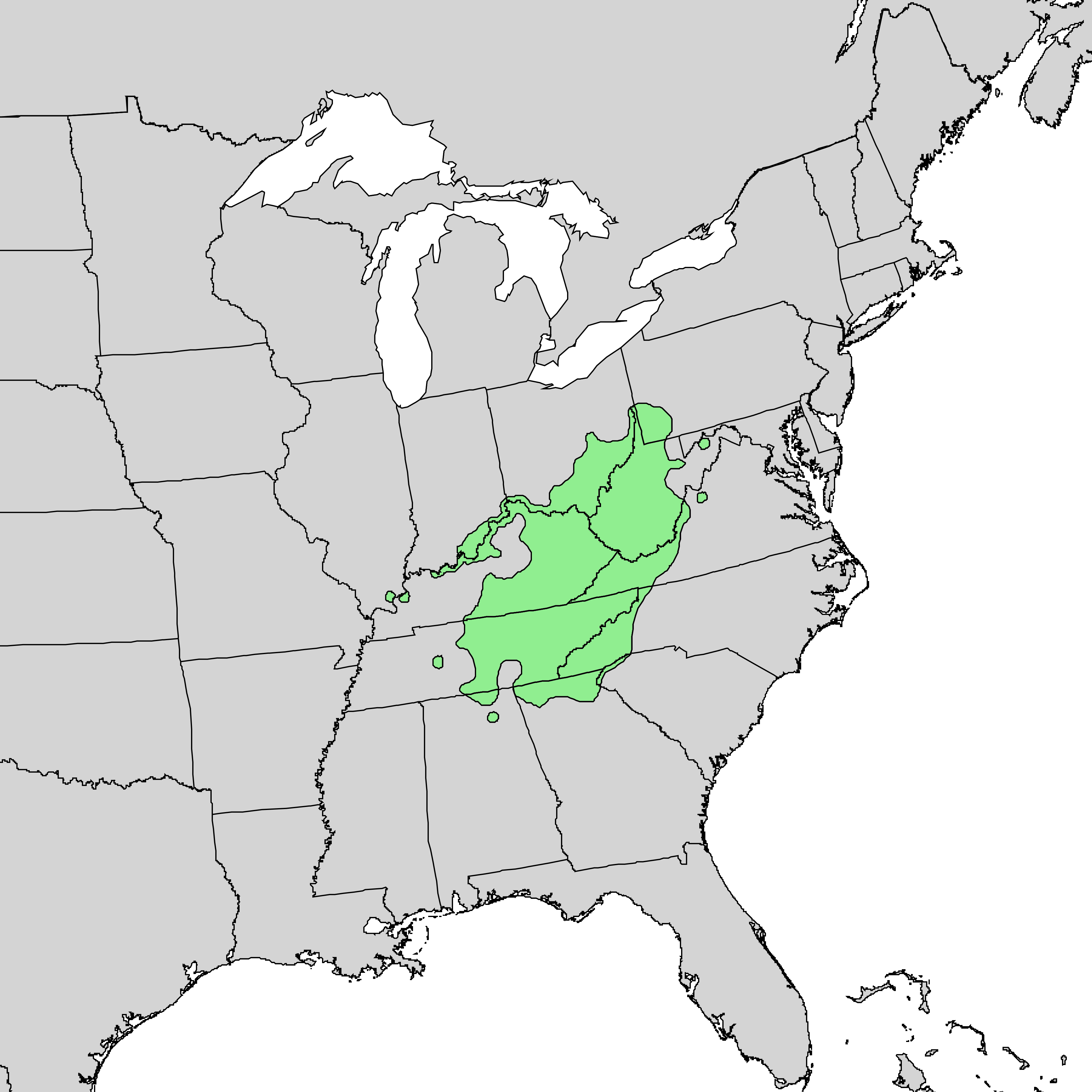

Synonyms
- Aesculus octandra Marshall

= Aesculus flava =

Species of tree

Aesculus flava, also known commonly as the common buckeye, the sweet buckeye, and the yellow buckeye, is a species of deciduous tree in the Hippocastanaceae family. The species is native to the Ohio Valley and Appalachian Mountains of the Eastern United States. It grows in mesophytic forests or floodplains, generally in acidic to circumneutral soil, reaching a height of 20 to 48 m (66 to 157 ft).

== Description ==
The yellow buckeye or also known as the sweet buckeye is an irregular to upright-oval, canopy tree, it can reach heights of 20 to 48 m (66 to 157 ft) tall with stout picturesque branches that tend to sweep the ground. The wood is soft, weak and does not resist decay, it also produces a bad odor when green but the seasoned wood is odorless, white and lightweight. The twigs have a faintly rank odor, but much less so than the Ohio buckeye, A. glabra.

The leaves are palmately compound with five (rarely seven) leaflets, 10–25 cm (3.9–9.8 in) long and broad. Palmately-compound, deciduous leaves usually turn orange to red in the fall. The flowers are produced in panicles in spring, yellow to yellow-green, each flower 2–3 cm (0.79–1.18 in) long with the stamens shorter than the petals (unlike the related A. glabra, Ohio buckeye, in which the stamens are longer than the petals). The flowers are followed by development of buckeye fruit, which consists of 1-2 buckeyes in a leathery light brown partitioned husk.

The fruit is a smooth (spineless), round or oblong capsule 5–7 cm (2.0–2.8 in) in diameter, containing 1-3 nut-like seeds, 2.5–3.5 cm (0.98–1.38 in) in diameter, brown with a whitish basal scar. The trunk can be dark gray to brown when young, furrowed and ridged when middle aged, when mature it becomes scaly and platy. The buckeye fruit resembles the eye of a deer, which is how it got its name buckeye.

== Taxonomy ==
The common name for the Aesculus flava is sweet buckeye and yellow buckeye, in the family Sapindaceae. It is cultivated as an ornamental tree. Genus name is the latin name for a kind of oak bearing edible acorns but applied by Linnaeus to this genus. Aesculus was the Latin name that is given to an oak or any tree that has seeds that are eaten by livestock, while flava (or flavum) is the Latin word for yellow, referring to the buckeye's yellow flowers. The species was once called Aesculus octandra and is still sometimes sold under that name in the nursery trade.

== Distribution and habitat ==
The yellow buckeye is most successful in full sun in moist, rich, well-drained, seep and slightly acidic soils. Poor clay or dry soils is not the best conditions for the yellow buckeye, but it can tolerate short flooding and urban conditions. The yellow buckeye can be found in rich soils on river bottoms, stream banks and mountain slopes in southwestern Pennsylvania to northern Alabama and Georgia and can also be down the Ohio River valley reaching to Illinois.

This tree is known to be messy and needs a large park or yard to thrive. The tree can grow 20 m (66 ft) high, but in the mountains it can reach heights of 27 m (89 ft) tall and 13 m (43 ft)wide or more, with an oval crown and a 3 foot diameter trunk. When in lowlands this tree is more typically takes a small tree or shrub form. The plant needs full sun, 6 or more hours of direct sunlight a day and partial shade. The plant has a low flammability rating.

== Ecology ==
Pests of this plant include the buckeye lacebug, Japanese beetles, bagworms, and borers, these are rare but can be troublesome. Other issues include leaf scorch, leaf spot, leaf blotch, and powdery mildew as other buckeyes but is not nearly as susceptible. Leaf scorch can occur in dry conditions or sites that are exposed to wind. Disease problems tend to be not as troublesome. The yellow buckeye is not as prone to unsightly foliage diseases, pest damage or early defoliation as the other Buckeyes and Horsechestnuts.

== Toxicity ==
The seed is very rich in toxic saponins that are poorly absorbed in the human body, but can pass through without harm. Poisoning from saponins is rare but abdominal pain is possible. The fruit is poisonous but can be made edible through a leaching process.

== Cultivation ==
Aesculus flava is cultivated as an ornamental tree. The tree's showy yellow flowers and good autumn color are attractive in larger gardens and in parks. This plant has gained the Royal Horticultural Society's Award of Garden Merit.

This tree has a coarse texture and leaves that are dark that attract attention as a specimen plant. This tree is not a good fit for small areas and needs to be put in a large open area in order to form due to its size. Aesculus flava tends to produce large amounts of leaf and flower litter in the summer and fall. The fruit makes good food for wildlife but can produce undesirable litter in urban areas. The nectar from the flowers attracts hummingbirds, bees, butterflies, and other pollinating insects, the nuts attract squirrels.

== Uses ==
The largest of the buckeyes, the Native Americans historically made food from the seeds, after the removal of the toxic element by roasting and soaking. The seed contains saponins and needs to be leached of toxins before it can be eaten, the North American Indians would do so by slow-roasting the nuts, cut them into thin slices, put them in a cloth bag to be rinsed in the stream for 2–3 days. The seed can be 45 mm in diameter and is said to be bitter, but when cooked, is said to be as sweet as a chestnut.

The saponins in the seed can be used as a soap substitute. Saponins can be obtained by chopping them up into small pieces immersing them into hot water, it can be used to wash the body or clothes. Out of all the American hardwoods its wood is the softest and makes poor lumber, but can be used for pulpwood and woodenware. It can be used to make artificial limbs, wooden ware, pulp and can be sawn into lumber.

A paste made from the seeds is used in bookbinding to deter insect damage.

== Photo gallery ==
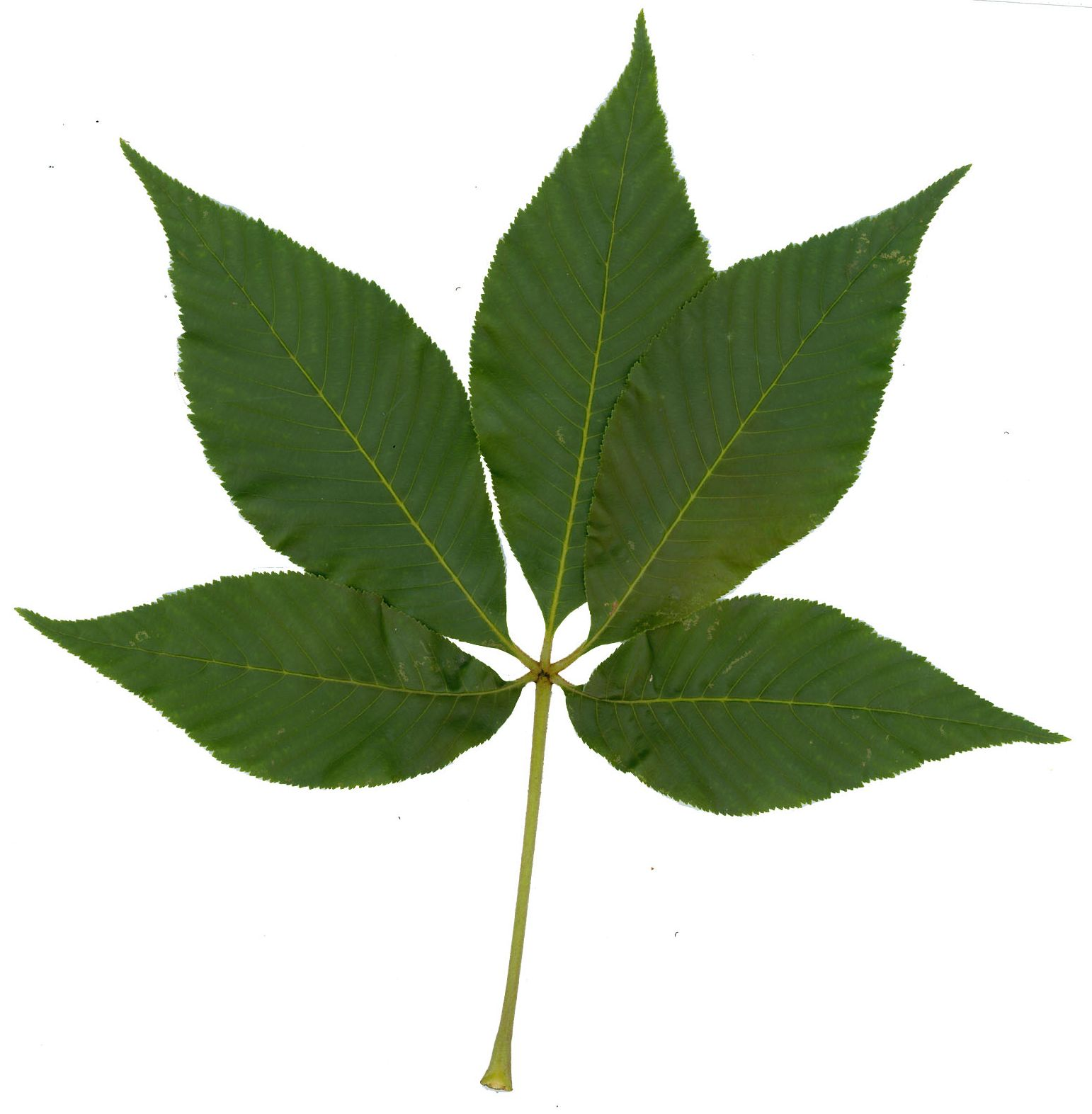
Leaf

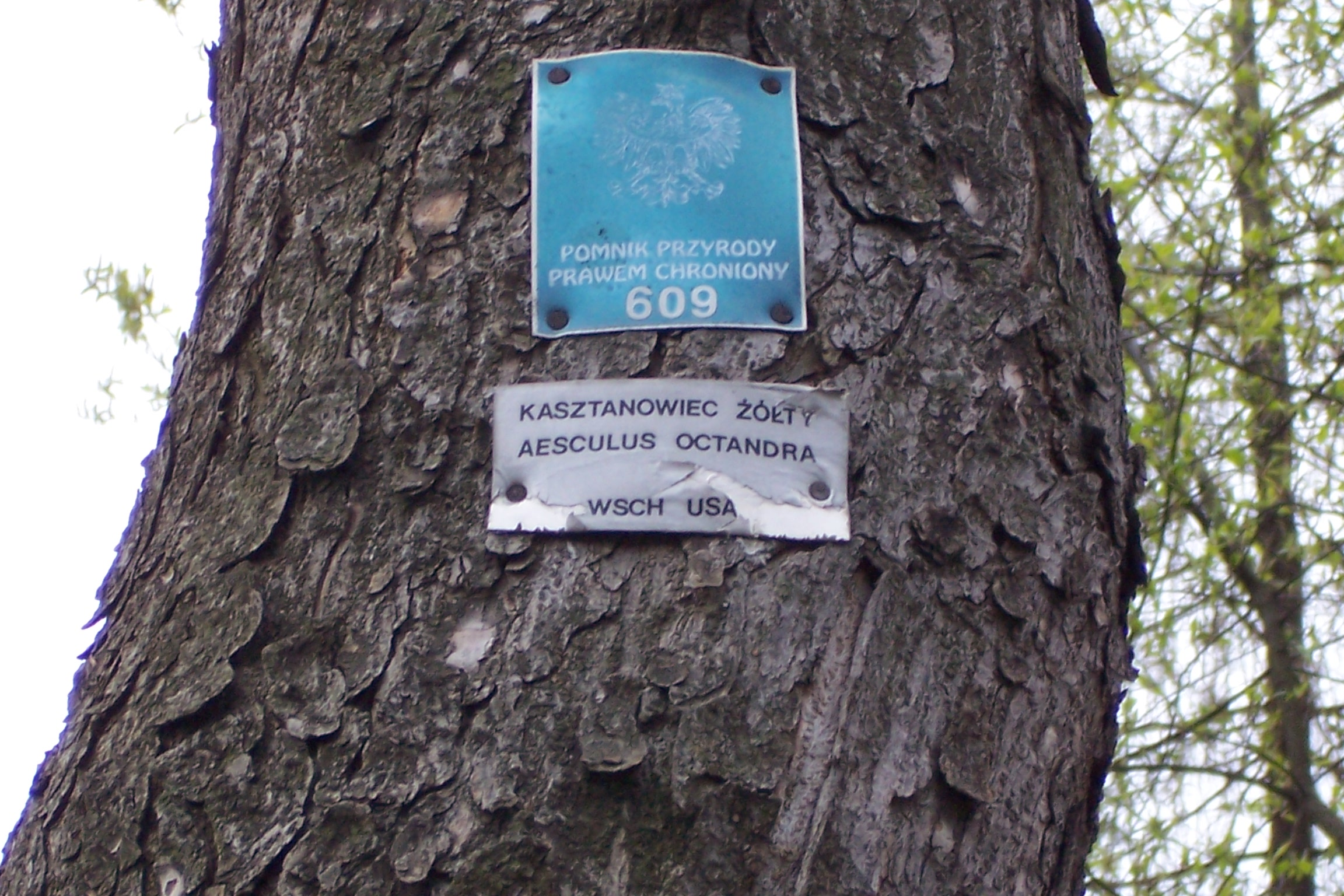
Bark

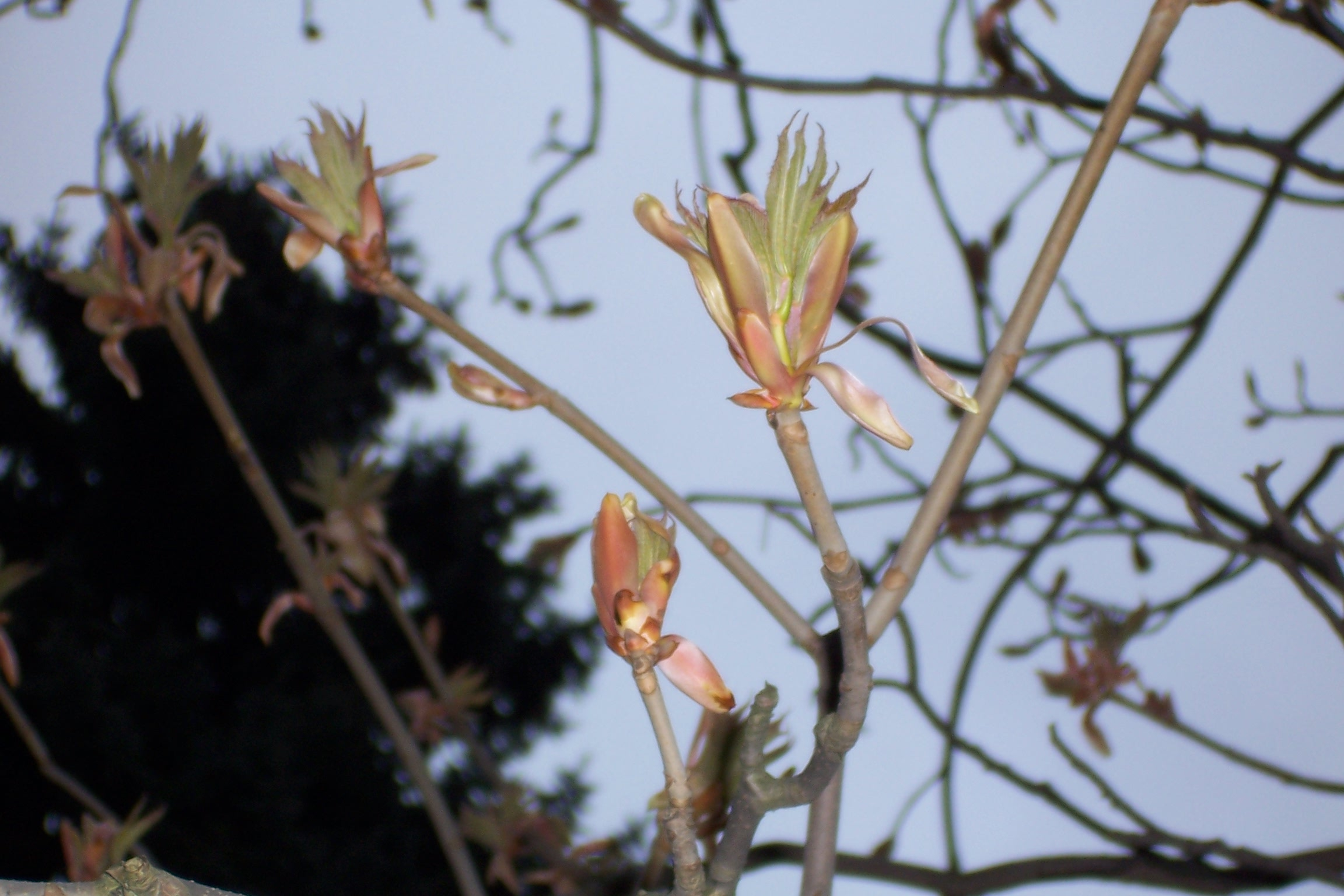
Spring bud break

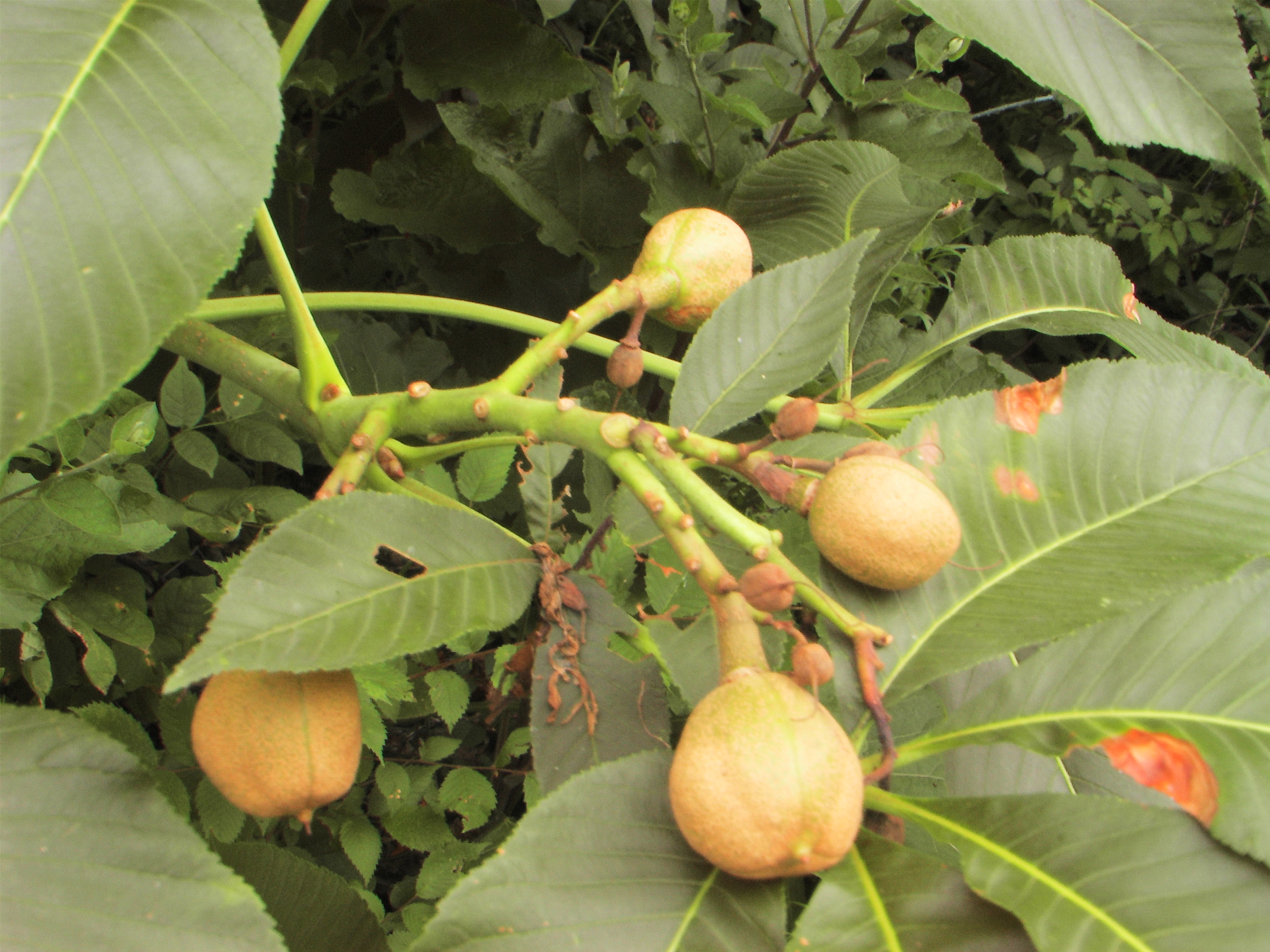
Fruit
