= Aesculus =

- Aesculus hippocastanum in Germany

Scientific classification
- Kingdom: Plantae
- Clade: Tracheophytes
- Clade: Angiosperms
- Clade: Eudicots
- Clade: Rosids
- Order: Sapindales
- Family: Sapindaceae
- Subfamily: Hippocastanoideae
- Genus: Aesculus; L.

Type species
- Aesculus hippocastanum L.

Species
- Aesculus assamica (syn. A. wangii); Aesculus californica; Aesculus chinensis; Aesculus flava (syn. A. octandra); Aesculus glabra; Aesculus hippocastanum; Aesculus indica; Aesculus parryi; Aesculus parviflora; Aesculus pavia; Aesculus sylvatica; Aesculus turbinata; Aesculus × bushii; Aesculus × carnea; Aesculus × hybrida; Aesculus × marylandica; Aesculus × mutabilis; Aesculus × neglecta; Aesculus × woerlitzensis

Genus of flowering plants

The genus Aesculus (/ˈaɪskjʊləs/) is a genus of about 12 species of flowering plants in the family Sapindaceae. They are trees and shrubs, mostly native to the temperate Northern Hemisphere. The European and Asian species are known as horse-chestnut or horse chestnut, and the North American species as buckeye.

== Description ==
Aesculus species are shrubs or trees growing to 4–35 metres (13–115 feet) tall. They have stout shoots with resinous, often sticky, buds, with opposite, palmately divided, deciduous, leaves; these are often very large, to 65 centimetres (26 inches) across in the Japanese horse-chestnut A. turbinata. The flowers are showy, insect- or bird-pollinated, with four or five petals fused into a lobed corolla tube, arranged in a panicle inflorescence. Flowering is in spring or summer, from February (rarely January) in A. assamica to July (rarely August) in A. indica and A. parviflora; some species may have a small second flowering in autumn.

The fruit matures to a capsule 2–5 cm (1–2 in) diameter, usually globose, containing one to three seeds (often erroneously called a nut) per capsule. Capsules containing more than one seed result in flatness on one side of the seeds. The point of attachment of the seed in the capsule (hilum) shows as a large, circular, whitish scar. The capsule epidermis has "spines" (botanically, prickles) in some species, while in others the capsules are warty or smooth. At maturity, the capsule splits into three sections to release the seeds.

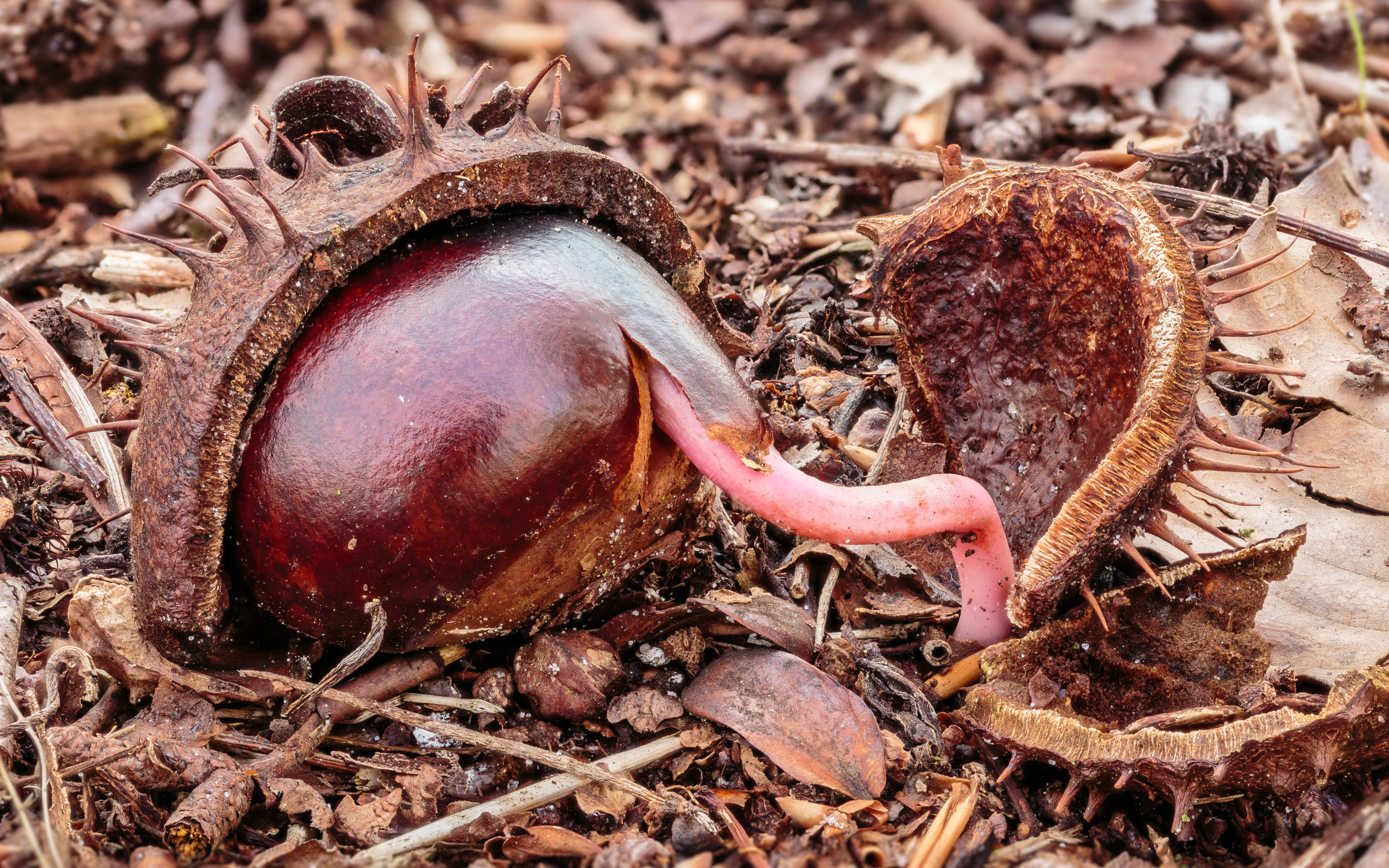
Germinating seed (still in partial shell) taking root

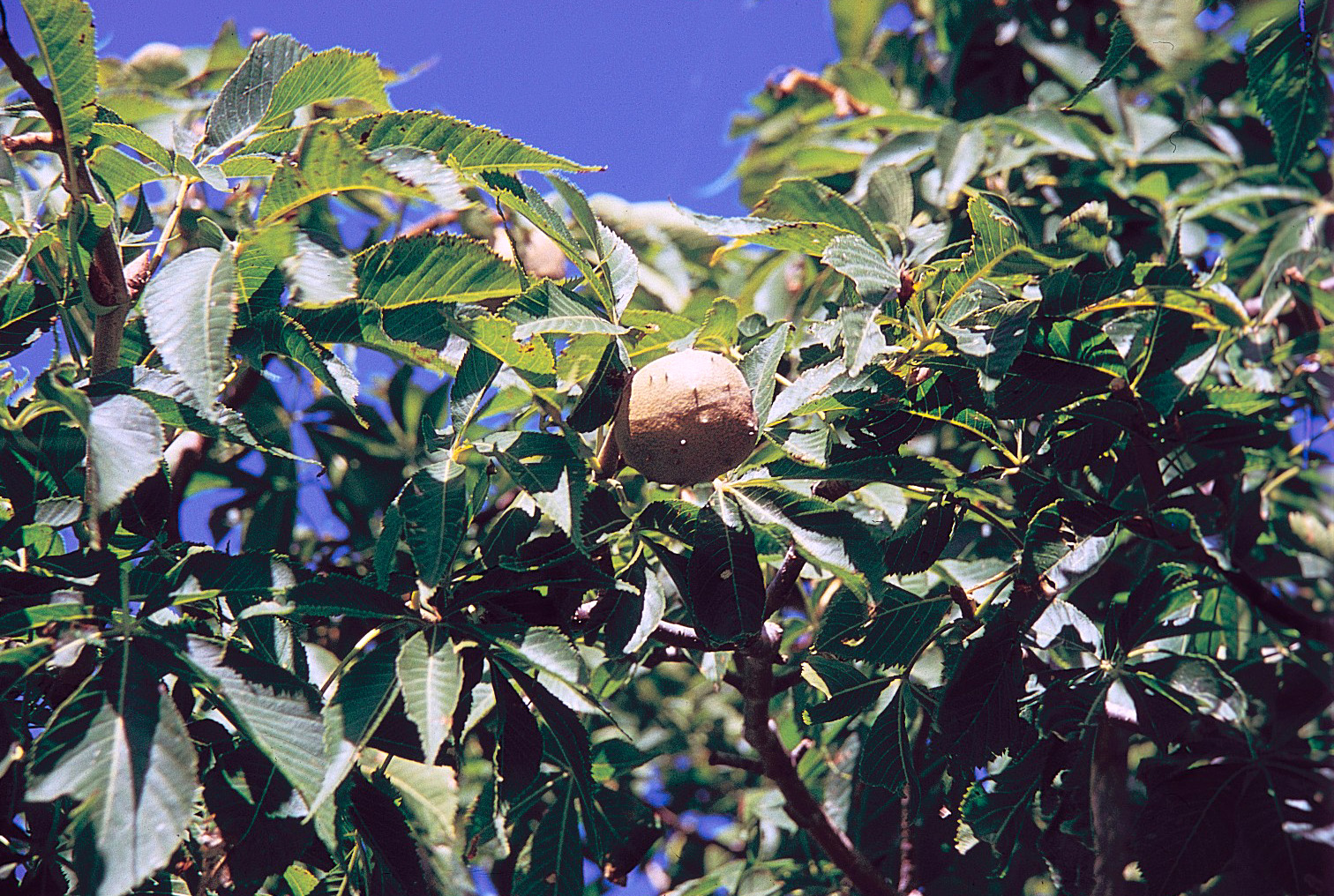
Aesculus glabra (Ohio buckeye)

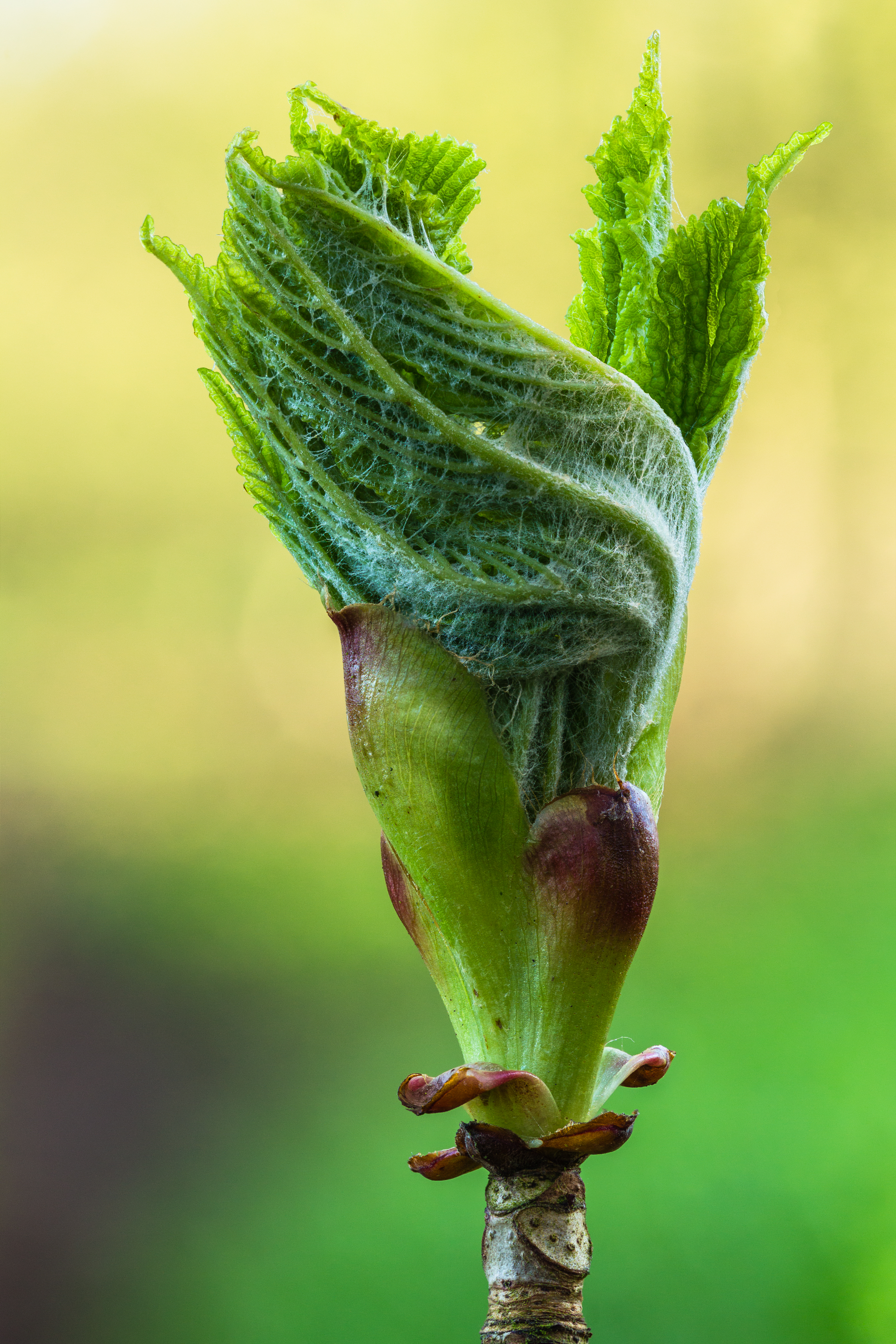
Leaf bud

=== Similar species ===
The fruit of the Mexican buckeye resemble Aesculus fruit, but belong to a related though different genus Ungnadia.

The common name "horse chestnut" invites confusion with the chestnuts in the genus Castanea in the order Fagales; the name is often hyphenated as horse-chestnut to minimise this confusion.

== Taxonomy ==
The horse-chestnut A. hippocastanum was unknown to botanical science until 1596, when the Dutch botanist Carolus Clusius was given foliage and flowers in Vienna; it was then introduced further west, with the first plants reaching France in 1603, and Britain between 1612–1615.

Carl Linnaeus named the genus Aesculus after the Roman name for an edible acorn. The genus was considered to be in the ditypic family Hippocastanaceae along with Billia, but phylogenetic analyses of morphological and molecular data have more recently caused this family, along with the Aceraceae (maples and Dipteronia), to be included in the soapberry family (Sapindaceae).

=== Species ===
As of 2025, Plants of the World Online accepts 12 species, with seven species native to North America, four native to Asia, and one native to Europe. Some other authors have accepted more species. Hardin (1957–1960) accepted 13 species, the Trees and Shrubs Online website cites "13–15" species with descriptions given for 14 species, and Harris et al. (2009) accepted 16 species. Six natural hybrids occur, and several others have been raised in cultivation.

Image	Scientific name	Common name	Distribution	Notes
	Aesculus assamica	Assam horse-chestnut	Southeastern Asia from northeast India (Sikkim) eastward to southern China (Guangxi) and northern Vietnam	Syn. A. wangii
	Aesculus californica	California buckeye	Western North America in California	
	Aesculus chinensis	Chinese horse-chestnut	Eastern Asia	Two varieties often distinguished, var. chinensis and var. wilsonii
	Aesculus flava	yellow buckeye	Eastern North America	Syn. A. octandra
	Aesculus glabra	Ohio buckeye	eastern North America	Two varieties, var. arguta and var. glabra
	Aesculus hippocastanum	[common] horse-chestnut	Southeastern Europe, in Albania, northwestern Greece, and northern Bulgaria	
	Aesculus indica	Indian horse-chestnut	Southern Asia, in the western Himalaya in northeastern Afghanistan, northern Pakistan, northwestern India and western Nepal	
	Aesculus parryi	Parry's buckeye	Western North America, endemic to Mexico in Baja California del Norte	
	Aesculus parviflora	bottlebrush buckeye	Southeastern North America	
	Aesculus pavia	red buckeye	Southeastern North America	Two varieties, var. flavescens and var. pavia
	Aesculus sylvatica	painted buckeye	Southeastern North America	
	Aesculus turbinata	Japanese horse-chestnut	Japan	

=== Etymology ===
Aesculus derives from the Latin esca ('nourishment').

== Distribution and habitat ==
Aesculus is mostly native to the temperate Northern Hemisphere, but one species (A. assamica) into subtropical areas of southeast Asia. The genus exhibits a classical Arcto-Tertiary distribution. (Note: This designation has as a part of it a term, Tertiary, that is now discouraged as a formal geochronological unit by the International Commission on Stratigraphy.)

== Cultivation ==
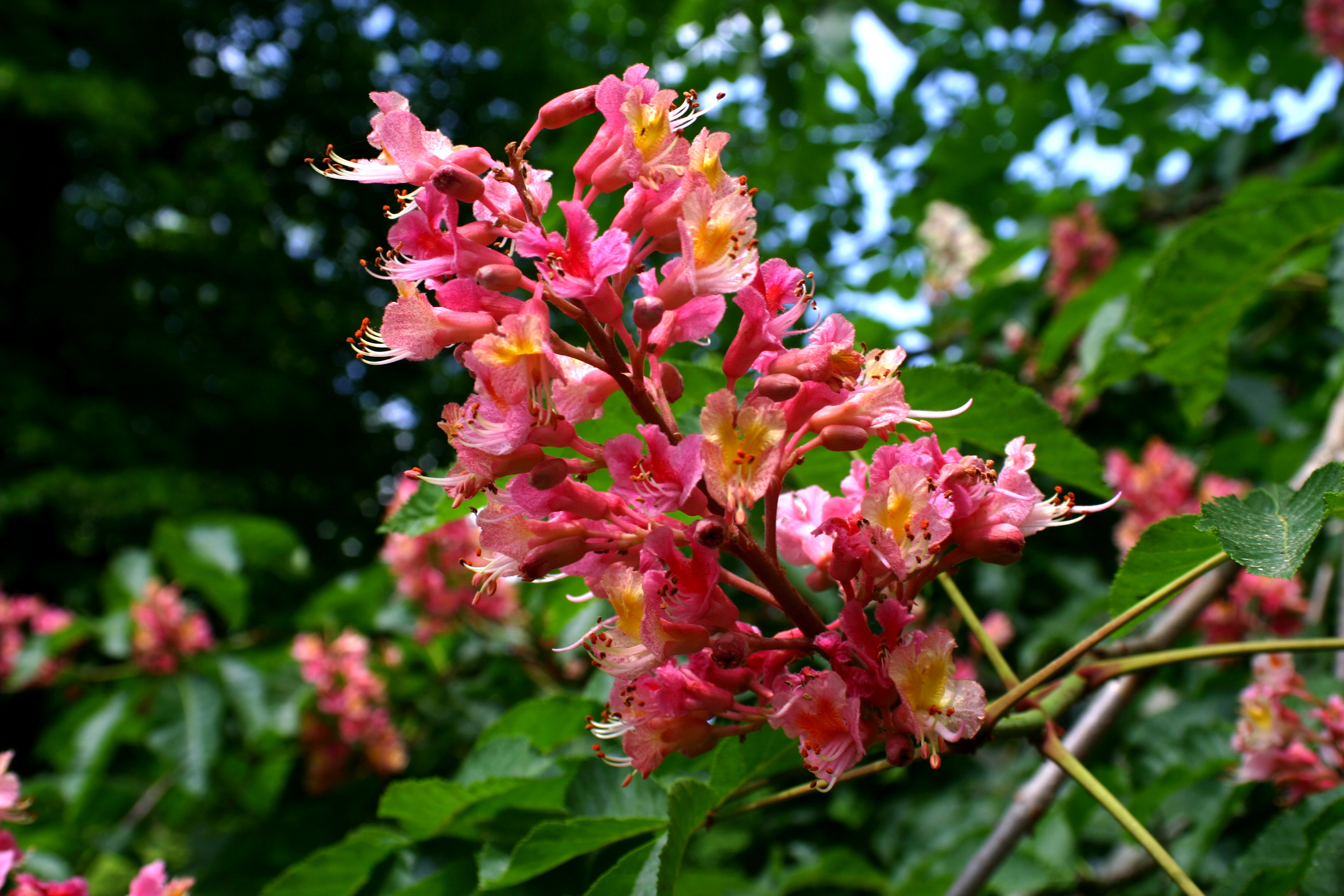
Flowers of Aesculus × carnea (red horse-chestnut)

The most familiar member of the genus worldwide is the common horse-chestnut, Aesculus hippocastanum. The yellow buckeye, Aesculus flava (syn. A. octandra), is also a valuable ornamental tree with yellow flowers, but is less widely planted. Among the smaller species is the bottlebrush buckeye, A. parviflora, a flowering shrub. Several other members of the genus are used as ornamental plants, and several horticultural hybrids have also been developed, most notably the red horse-chestnut Aesculus × carnea, a hybrid between A. hippocastanum and A. pavia.

== Uses ==
Aesculus seeds were traditionally eaten, after leaching, by the Jōmon people of Japan over about four millennia, until 300 AD.

All parts of the trees are moderately toxic, but the attractive nut-like seeds are the most likely part to cause poisoning. The toxin affects the gastrointestinal system, causing gastrointestinal disturbances. The United States Department of Agriculture notes that the toxicity is due to the saponin aescin and the glucoside aesculin, with alkaloids possibly contributing.

In North America, several native American tribes, particularly in the western and central US, such as Miwok, Pomo, Yokut, Maidu, historically used buckeye seeds like California buckeye to harvest fish by using the saponins, which had been extracted by the plant's seeds. These tribes would crush buckeye seeds to release saponins into streams or shallow water, where the compounds would stun or kill the fish, allowing for easier capture. They then boiled and drained (leached) the fish at least three times to dilute the toxin's effects. New shoots from the seeds also have been known to kill grazing cattle.

In Britain, the fruit are often called conkers because of their link to the game of conkers, played with the seeds.

== In culture ==
Growing at the base of the Eiffel Tower in Paris

In Geneva, Switzerland, an official chestnut tree is used to indicate the beginning of spring; every year since 1818, the tree is observed by the secretary of the Grand Council of Geneva (the local parliament), and the opening of the first leaf is recorded and announced publicly. Over the years, four different horse chestnut trees have been used for these recordings.

During his 1840 US presidential campaign, candidate William Henry Harrison called himself the "log cabin and hard cider candidate", portraying himself sitting in a log cabin made of buckeye logs and drinking hard cider, causing Ohio to become known as "the Buckeye State".

The leaf of Aesculus was the official symbol of Kyiv on its coat of arms used from 1969 to 1995. It remains an official symbol of Kyiv.

== See also ==
- Anne Frank tree
