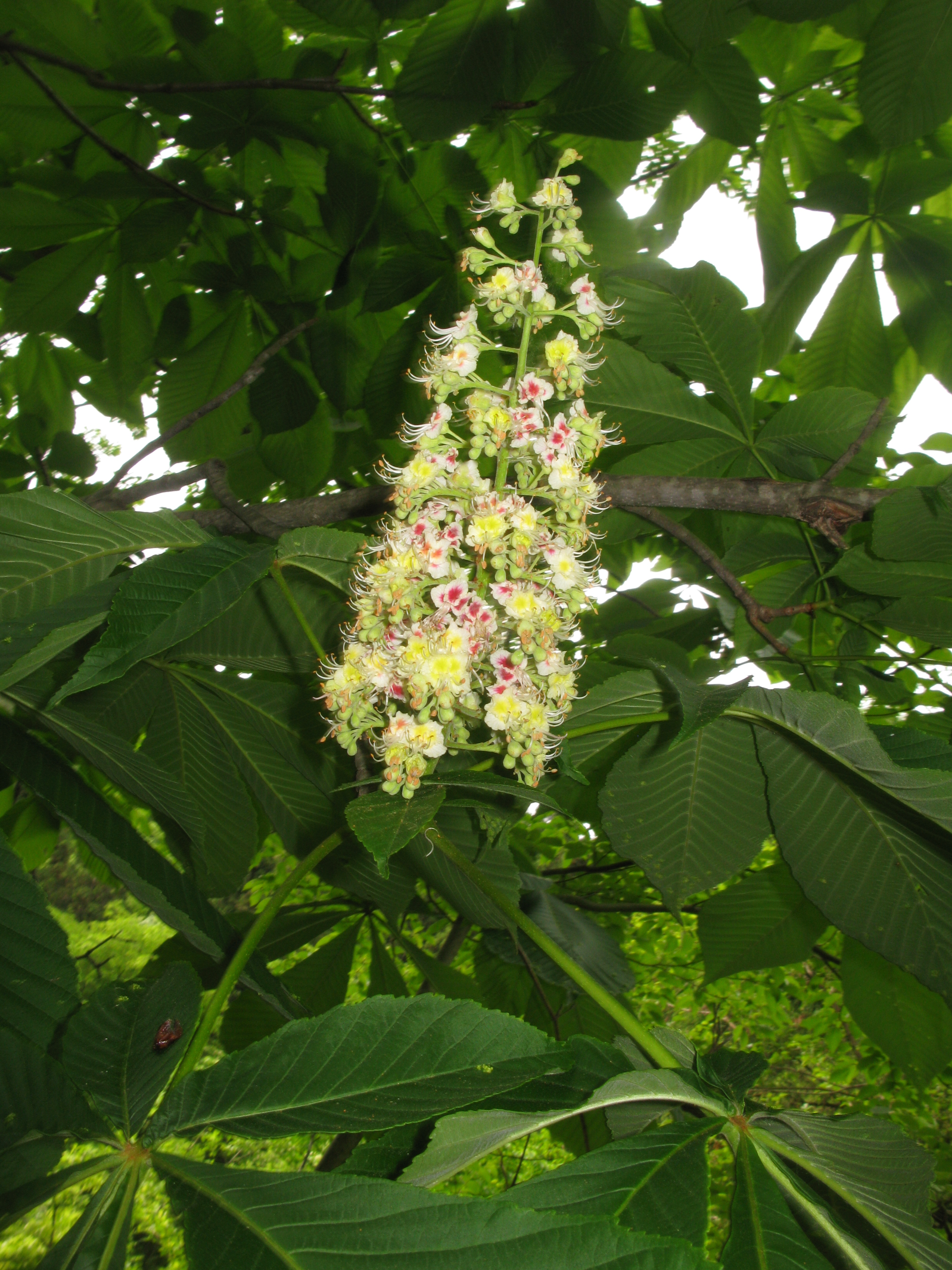

Scientific classification
- Kingdom: Plantae
- Clade: Tracheophytes
- Clade: Angiosperms
- Clade: Eudicots
- Clade: Rosids
- Order: Sapindales
- Family: Sapindaceae
- Genus: Aesculus
- Species: A. turbinata

Binomial name
- Aesculus turbinata Blume

Synonyms
- Aesculus turbinata f. pubescens (Rehder) Ohwi ex Yas Endo; Aesculus turbinata var. pubescens Rehder; Aesculus dissimilis Blume; Pawia dissimilis Kuntze; Pawia turbinata Kuntze

= Aesculus turbinata =

Species of tree

Aesculus turbinata, common name Japanese horse-chestnut (tochinoki (トチノキ, 栃の木) or tochi (トチ, 栃, 橡)), is native to Japan but cultivated elsewhere. It is a tree up to 30 metres (98 feet) tall. Flowers are white to pale yellowish with red spots. Capsules are dark brown, obovoid to pyriform. The seeds were traditionally eaten, after leaching, by the Jōmon people of Japan over about four millennia, until 300 AD. Today the seeds are used in Japanese cuisine to prepare tochimochi.

== Etymology ==
Aesculus was named by Linnaeus, and the name is derived from the Roman name, aesculus, of the durmast oak.

Turbinata means ‘conical’, ‘turbinate’, or ‘top-shaped’.
