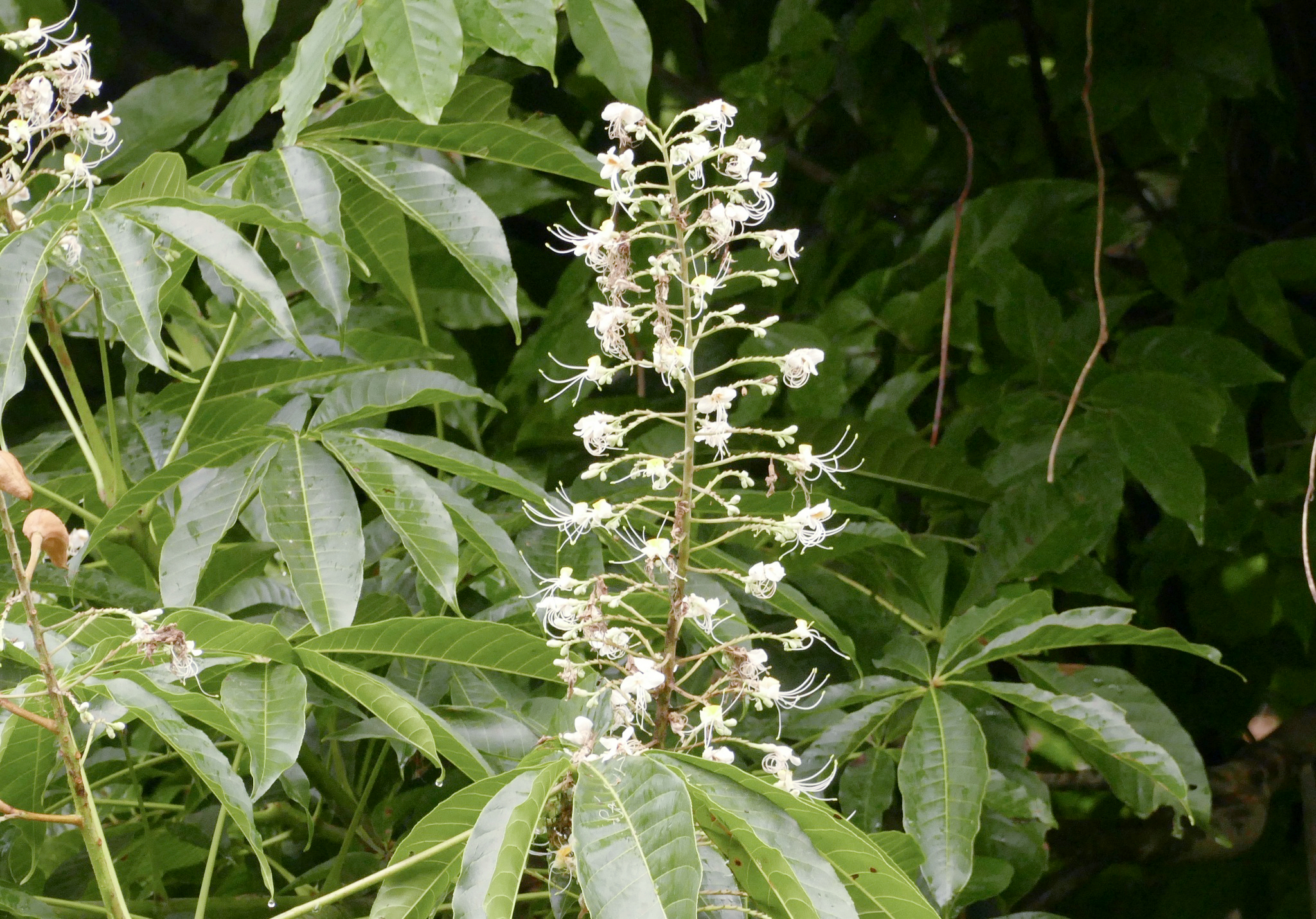
- Inflorescence and palmate leaves, Bhutan
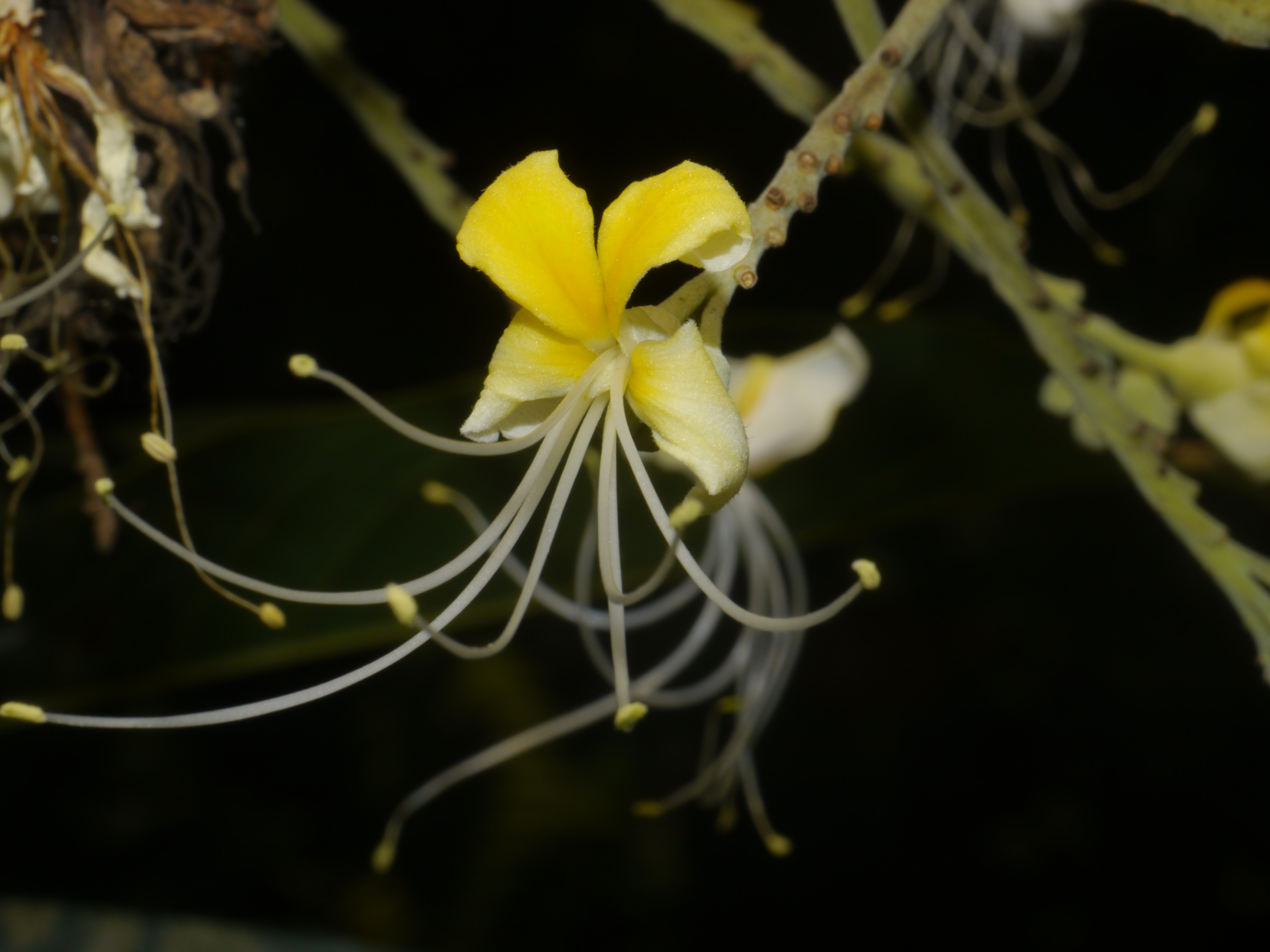
- Close-up of individual flower, Pakke Tiger Reserve, Arunachal Pradesh

Conservation status
- Least Concern (IUCN 3.1)

Scientific classification
- Kingdom: Plantae
- Clade: Tracheophytes
- Clade: Angiosperms
- Clade: Eudicots
- Clade: Rosids
- Order: Sapindales
- Family: Sapindaceae
- Genus: Aesculus
- Species: A. assamica

Binomial name
- Aesculus assamica Griff.

Synonyms
- List: Aesculus chuniana Hu & W.P.Fang; Aesculus khassyana C.R.Das & Majumdar; Aesculus lantsangensis Hu & W.P.Fang; Aesculus megaphylla Hu & W.P.Fang; Aesculus polyneura Hu & W.P.Fang; Aesculus polyneura var. dongchuanensis X.W.Li & W.Y.Yi; Aesculus punduana Wall. ex Hiern; Aesculus rupicola Hu & W.P.Fang; Aesculus tsiangii Hu & W.P.Fang; Aesculus wangii Hu; Aesculus wangii var. rupicola (Hu & W.P.Fang) W.P.Fang; Pavia khassyana Voigt; Pavia punduana Wall. ex Voigt; Pawia punduana Kuntze

= Aesculus assamica =

Species of plant

Aesculus assamica (syn. Aesculus wangii), the Assam horse-chestnut, is a widespread species of flowering plant in the genus Aesculus in the family Sapindaceae. It is native to warm temperate to subtropical areas of the eastern Himalayas from Sikkim through Bhutan and Assam to Arunachal Pradesh, and southwestern and southern China (including the far southeast of Tibet), Bangladesh, and mainland southeast Asia, except Cambodia and Peninsular Malaysia.

== Description ==
It is a tree growing to 32 m (105 ft) tall, it is found in a variety of forest habitats from 100 to 2,000 m (300 to 6,600 ft) altitude. Like all Aesculus species, the leaves are palmately compound, with 5–9 short-stalked glossy green leaflets, 12-35 cm long (rarely to 42 cm long) and 5-18 cm broad. The leaves are deciduous, or evergreen in at least some areas. The flowers are produced in early spring from February (rarely January) to May, in slender conical clusters up to 45 cm long; the individual flowers are white to yellowish, with dark spots. The fruit is a leathery capsule 8–9 cm long by 4–5 cm wide containing a single brown seed 3–7 cm diameter with a large white hilum covering nearly half the seed.

== Uses ==
It is used in traditional medicine for treatment of inflammation and as an antifungal agent, and is being investigated for treatment of skin infections.

It has been introduced into cultivation in Europe in Britain, and in France where a 15 year old specimen had reached 7.6 m tall.

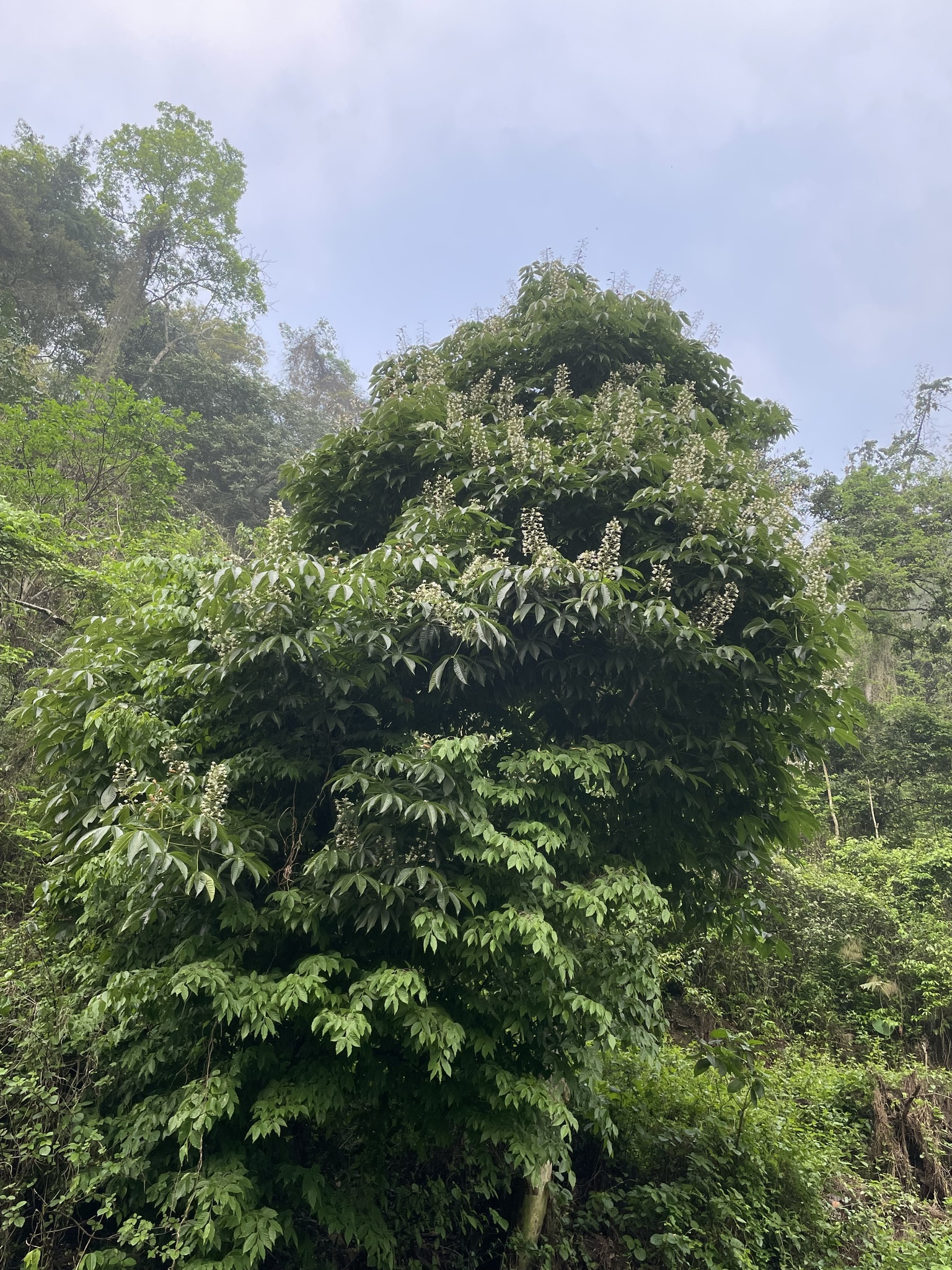
Tree in flower in mid April; Bhutan

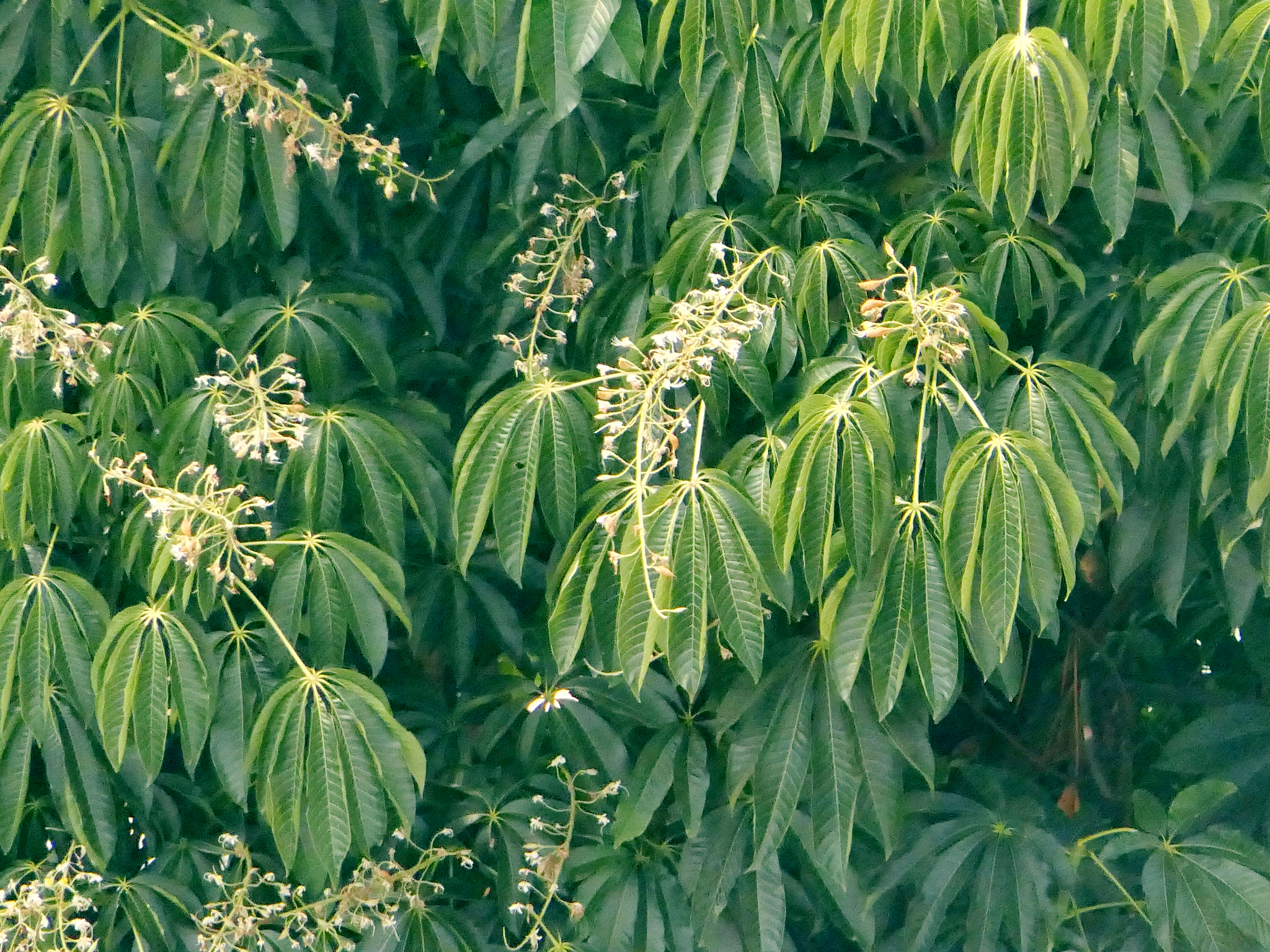
Foliage and flowers near end of flowering, late April; Kalimpong, West Bengal, India

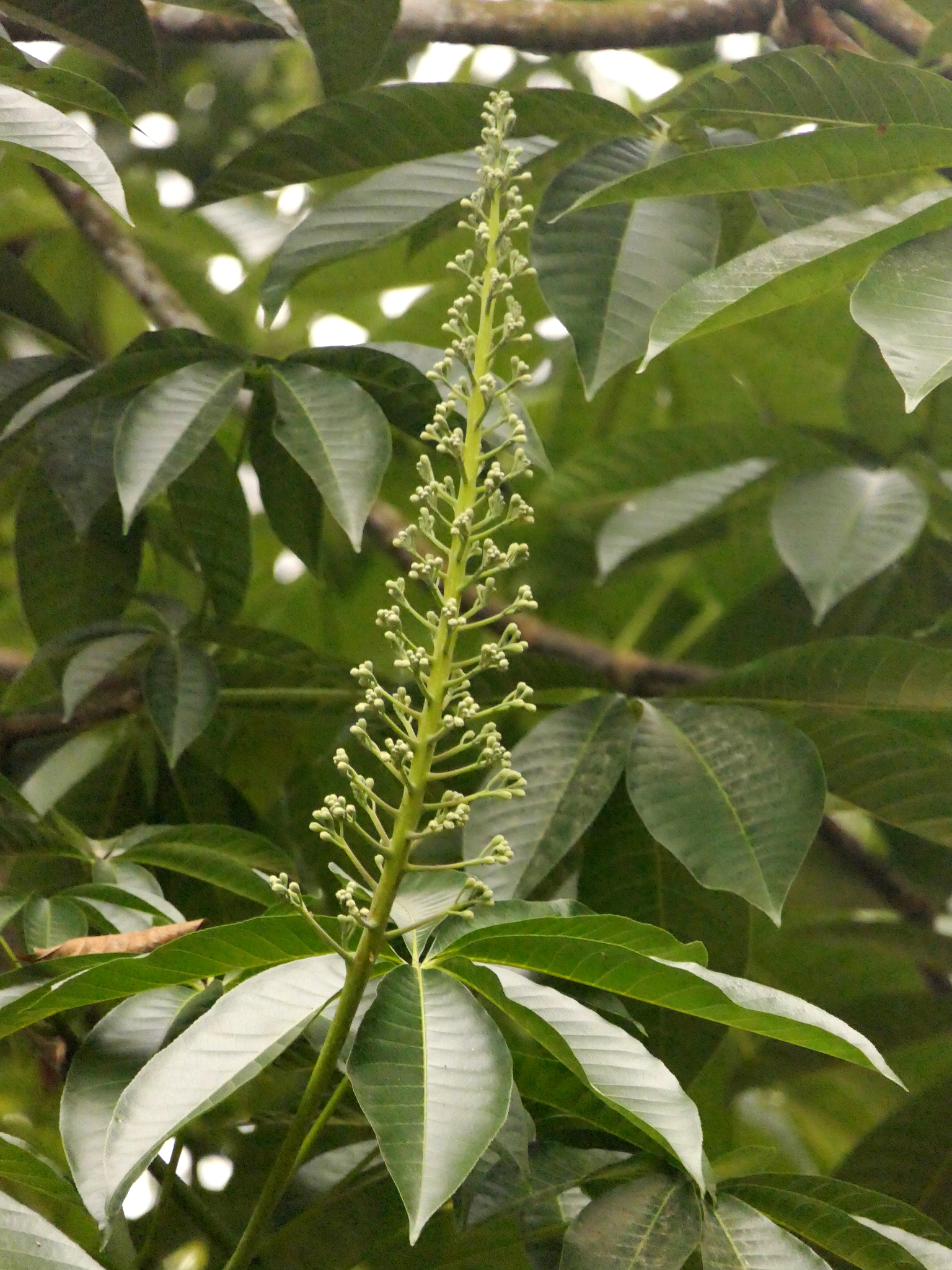
Leaves and flower spike in bud, mid February; Kalimpong, West Bengal, India
