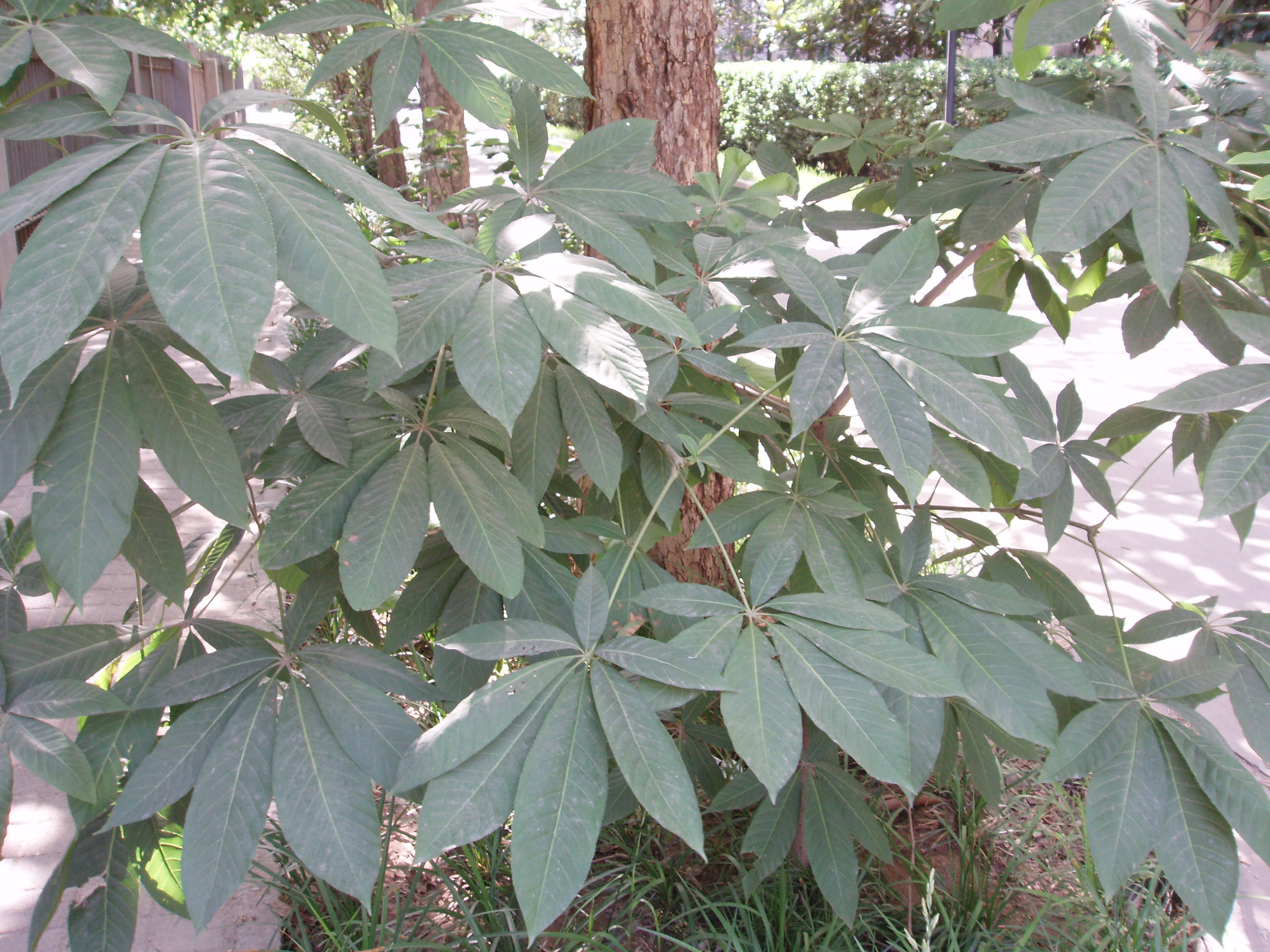
- Aesculus chinensis leaves

Scientific classification
- Kingdom: Plantae
- Clade: Embryophytes
- Clade: Tracheophytes
- Clade: Angiosperms
- Clade: Eudicots
- Clade: Rosids
- Order: Sapindales
- Family: Sapindaceae
- Genus: Aesculus
- Species: A. chinensis

Binomial name
- Aesculus chinensis Bunge, Enum. Pl. China Bor. 10. 1833

Subspecies
- Aesculus chinensis var. chinensis Aesculus chinensis var. wilsonii

= Aesculus chinensis =

Species of flowering plant

Aesculus chinensis, the Chinese horse chestnut or Chinese buckeye (traditional Chinese: 七葉樹; simplified Chinese: 七叶树; pinyin: qi ye shu), is a deciduous temperate tree species in the genus Aesculus found across China. It was first successfully introduced to Britain in 1912 by plant collector William Purdom, who collected six young plants from the grounds of a temple in the western hills of Beijing, and brought them back to Veitch's Nursery in Coombe Hill near London. Purdom's correspondence regarding this event are held in the archives of the Arnold Arboretum. One plant was sent to the Royal Botanic Gardens Kew and two to the Arnold Arboretum in Boston. The original tree at Kew no longer exists but a young tree grafted from the original now grows in the Rhododendron Dell.

As a mature tree Aesculus chinensis can grow up to 80–90 ft or 25m tall. Its palmate mid green leaves have 5-7 leaflets, usually glabrous beneath.

It produces large white upright panicles of flowers from May to June. These are followed by round smooth fruit capsules, which contain 1 to 2 dark brown seeds.

The seed contains triterpenoid saponins and flavonoids, such as aescuflavoside and aescuflavoside A, which are glycosides of quercetin. Research has been conducted into the anti-inflammatory potential of the four main saponins contained within the seeds.

== Images ==
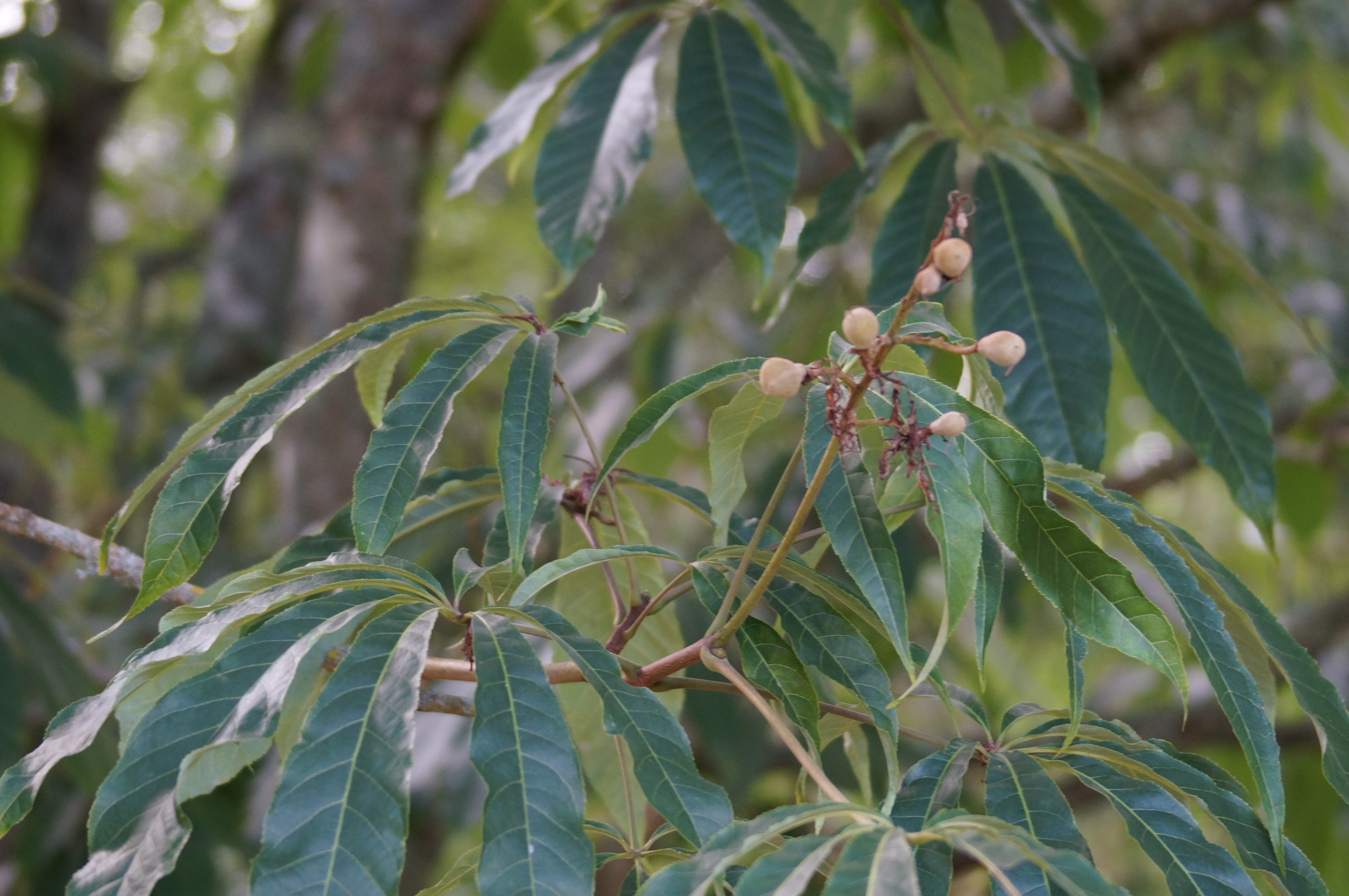

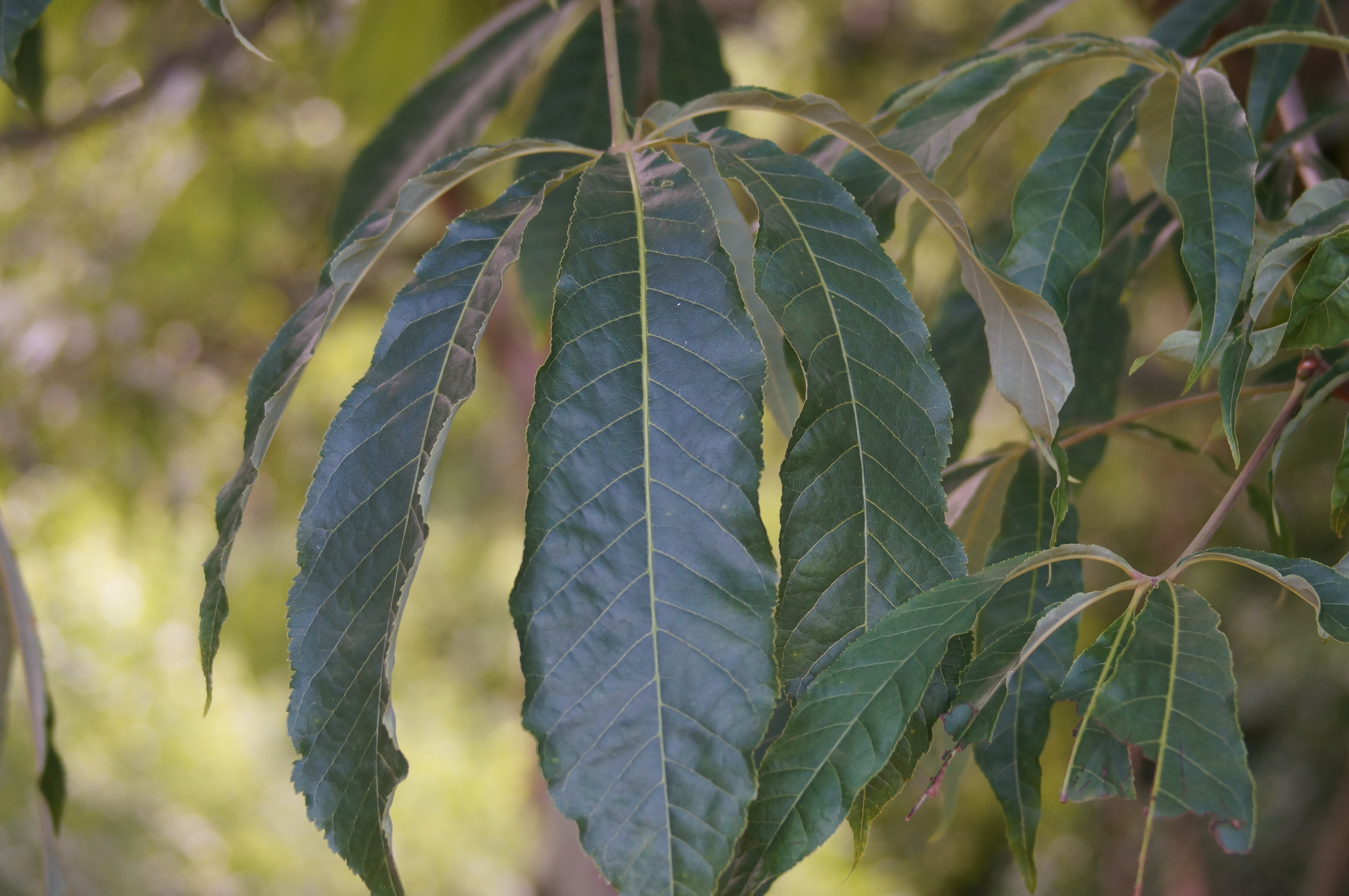

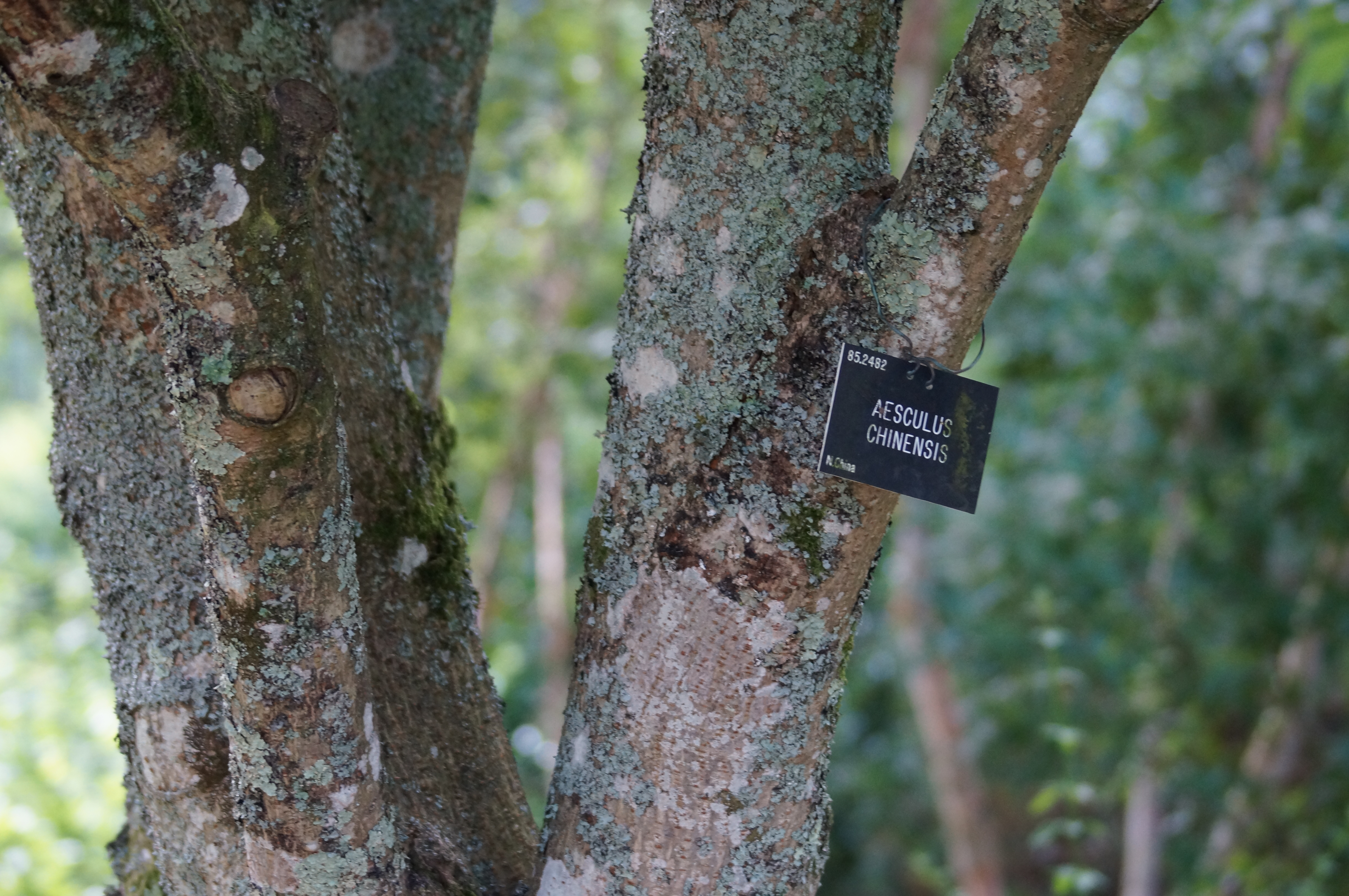
