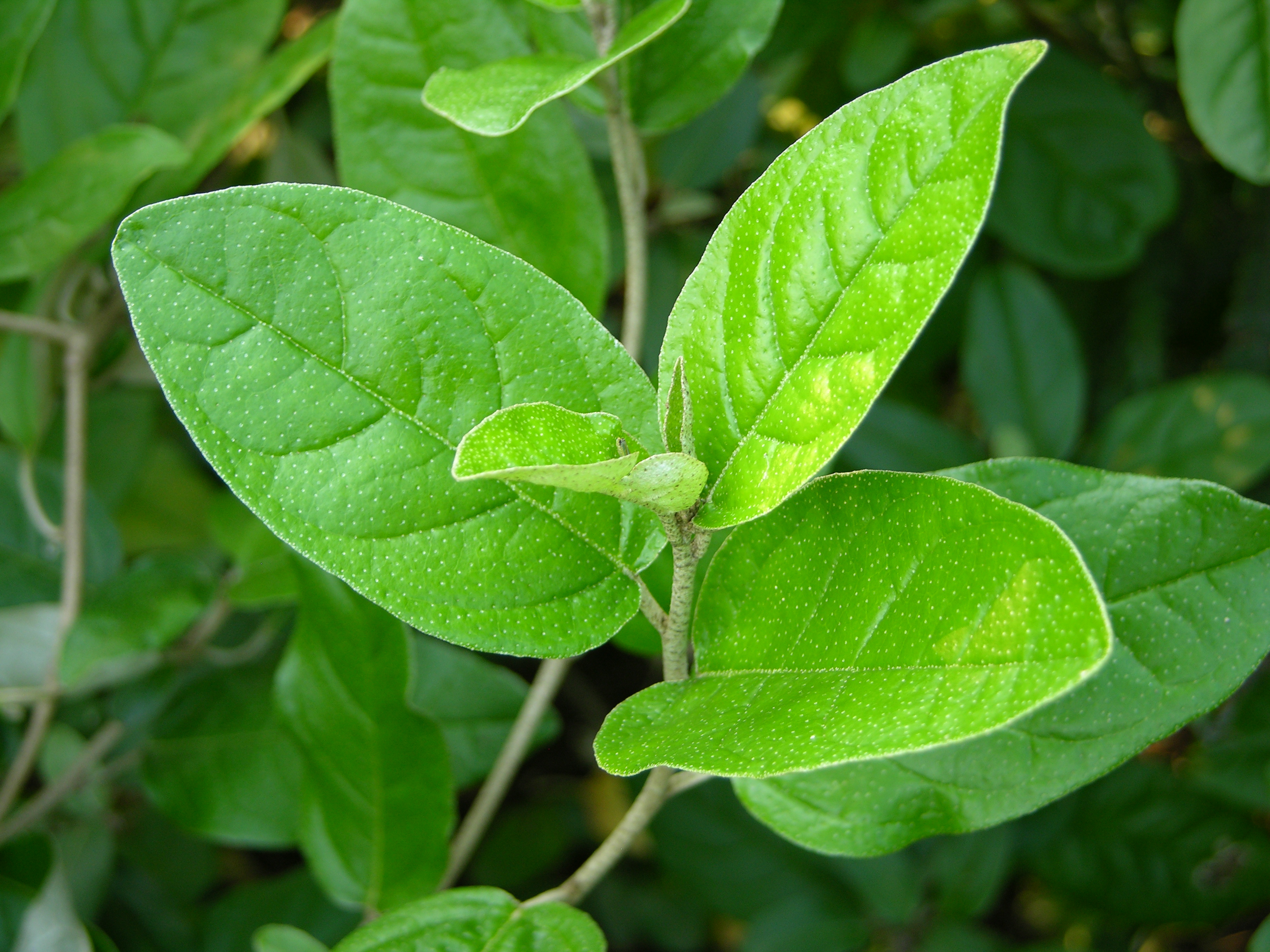

Conservation status
- Vulnerable (NatureServe)

Scientific classification
- Kingdom: Plantae
- Clade: Embryophytes
- Clade: Tracheophytes
- Clade: Spermatophytes
- Clade: Angiosperms
- Clade: Eudicots
- Clade: Rosids
- Order: Malpighiales
- Family: Euphorbiaceae
- Genus: Croton
- Species: C. alabamensis

Binomial name
- Croton alabamensis E.A. Sm. ex Chapm.

Varieties
- C. a. var. alabamensis C. a. var. texensis Ginzbarg

= Croton alabamensis =

Alabama croton

Species of flowering plant

Croton alabamensis, known as Alabama croton, is a rare species of flowering plant in the spurge family, Euphorbiaceae, that is endemic to Texas and Alabama in the Southeastern United States. It has two varieties whose ranges are separated by more than 1000 km: Croton alabamensis var. alabamensis (Alabama croton) is found in two central Alabama counties, while Croton alabamensis var. texensis (Texabama croton) is found in three counties in Texas.

The Alabama croton is a semi-evergreen monoecious shrub that reaches a height of 5–35 dm. It is the northernmost shrubby species of the genus Croton in North America and the largest species of Euphorbiaceae native to North America. It is grown as an ornamental for its form and foliage and is valued for its drought tolerance, low maintenance, and herbivore resistance. Although normally forming loose clonal colonies, it can be trained as a single-trunked, dense shrub. C. alabamensis and its nominate variety are considered Vulnerable by NatureServe, while C. a. var. texensis is considered Imperiled. Threats include habitat loss and forestry practices.

== Description ==
The Alabama croton is a semi-evergreen monoecious shrub that reaches a height of 5–35 dm The loose, multi-stemmed thickets it forms are colloquially known as "privet brakes". C. alabamensis is the northernmost shrubby species of the genus Croton in North America and the largest species of Euphorbiaceae native to North America.

=== Leaves ===
Leaves are clustered at branch tips and lack stipules. The petiole is 0.6–2 cm. Glands are absent at its apex. Leaf blades are elliptic, ovate, or oblong and measure 3–10 × 1.5–5 cm. Blade margins are typically entire, sometimes undulate. The base is rounded to obtuse, while the apex is acute, rounded, or emarginate. Abaxial surfaces are silvery or coppery and densely lepidote (a term meaning rough or scaly), while adaxial surfaces are green and sparsely lepidote. When crushed, leaves emit a fragrance similar to a mixture of banana and apple.

=== Flowers ===
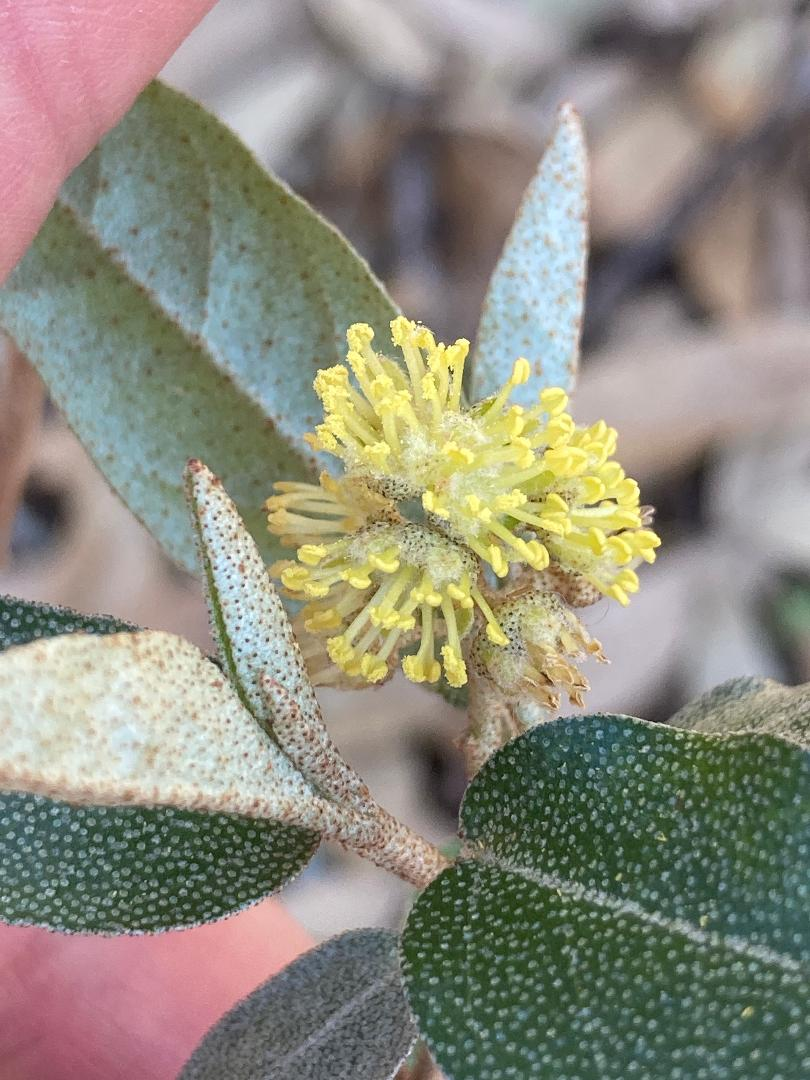
Staminate flower of C. a. var. texensis

The inflorescence is a bisexual or unisexual raceme 2–4.5 cm in length. Racemes have 0–15 staminate flowers and 0–10 pistillate flowers. Flowers are pollinated by bees. Pistillate flowers are formed earlier and are lower in the raceme than staminate flowers. Flowering occurs in the spring, with peak flowering occurring in mid-March.

==== Staminate (male) flowers ====
The pedicels of staminate flowers are 2.2–4 mm long. The 5 sepals are 1.1–2.9 mm in length and have a lepidote abaxial surface. The 5 petals are oblong-ovate and 2–3.1 mm in length with an abaxial surface that is glabrous except at margins, where it is stellate-ciliate. Staminate flowers have 10–22 stamens.

==== Pistillate (female) flowers ====
Pedicels of pistillate flowers are 2.2–7.5 mm in length, increasing to 7–11 mm when in fruit. The 5 sepals measure 2–4.5 mm in length, have entire margins, an incurved apex, and a lepidote abaxial surface. The 5 petals are pale green, ovate, and 2–3.5 mm in length. The ovary is 3-locular. There are 3 styles 2–5 mm long, usually unbranched, rarely bifid, with 3 terminal segments (sometimes 6).

=== Fruit and seeds ===
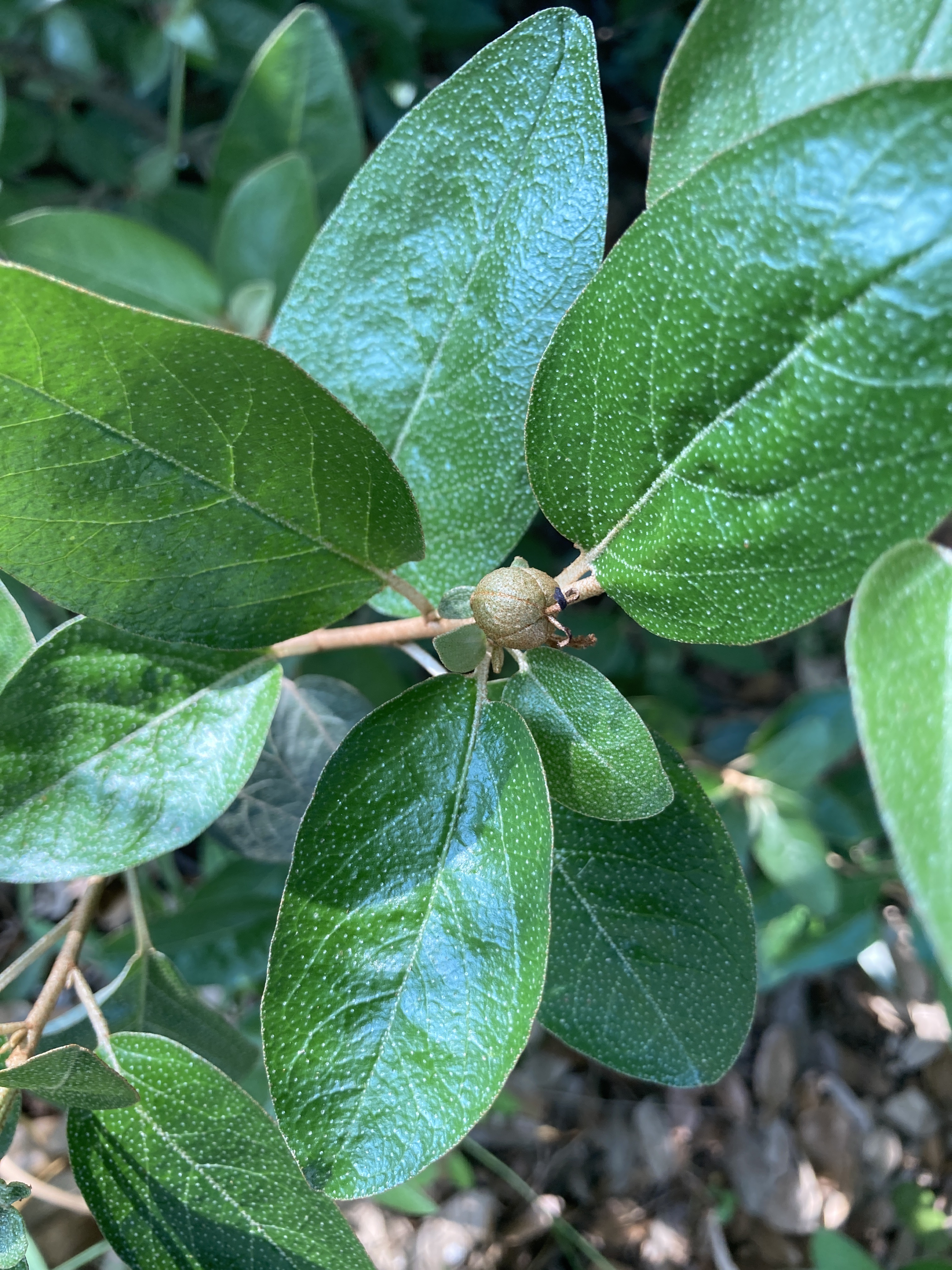
Leaves and capsule of C. alabamensis var. texensis

The fruit is a smooth capsule measuring 1.6–2.5 × 2–3 mm. The columella is 3-angled. Capsules ripen by June, after which seeds are explosively dehisced. Seeds are shiny and measure 6.7–8 × 5.2–6 mm. Seeds require cold stratification in order to germinate.

== Varieties ==
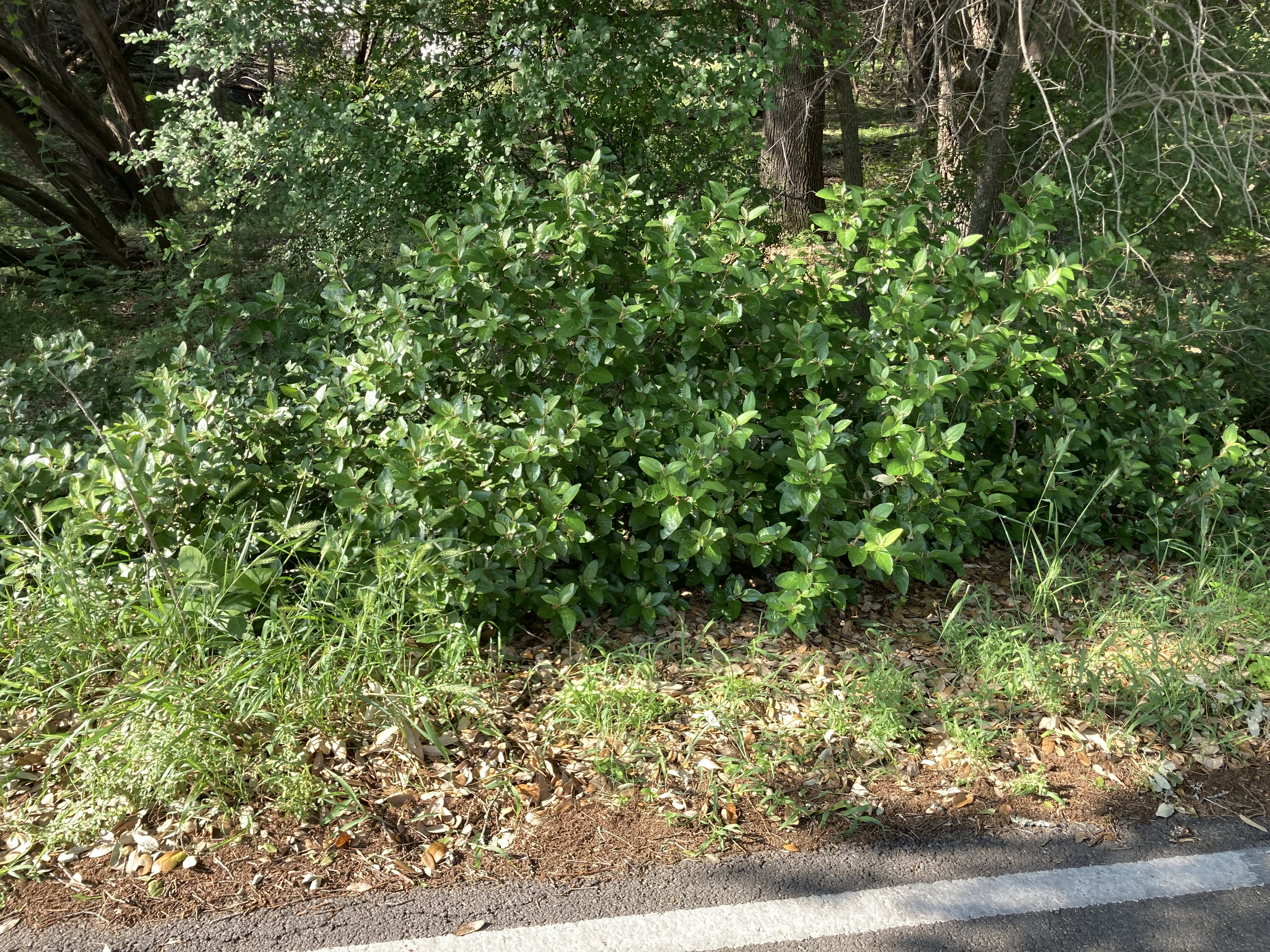
Habitus of C. alabamensis var. texensis

There are two varieties that are separated by more than 1000 km:

- Croton alabamensis var. alabamensis, or Alabama croton, is the nominate subspecies and is only found in two central Alabama counties (Black Warrior River, Tuscaloosa County and Cahaba River, Bibb County). A herbarium specimen was supposedly collected in Coffee County in Tennessee, but the veracity of this collection location is dubious. It is considered Vulnerable by NatureServe.
- Croton alabamensis var. texensis, or Texabama croton, is found in three counties (Bell, Coryell and Travis Counties) in Texas. It is considered Imperiled by NatureServe.

== Habitat and range ==
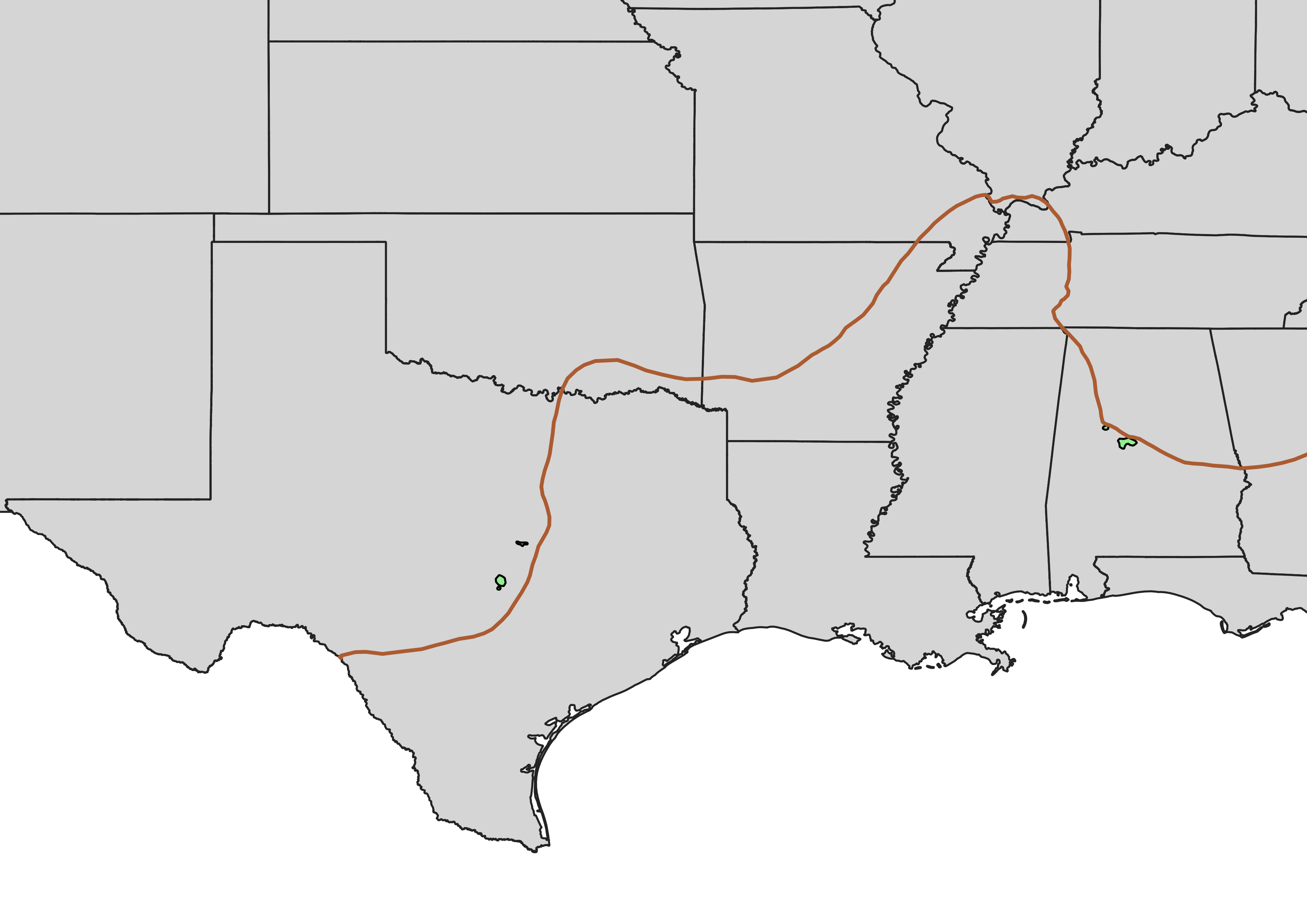
Range map showing Atlantic Plain boundary, which helps explain its distribution

Both varieties are found on a plateau or in foothills bordering the Atlantic Plain in limestone, shale, or dolomitic outcrops and adjacent outwashes.

=== Alabama ===
The nominate variety is found on dry slopes, bluffs, and outcroppings with thin, alkaline soil in Tuscaloosa and Bibb County, Alabama. In Tuscaloosa County, the plant occurs in the Black Warrior River watershed north of Tuscaloosa, which is part of the Cumberland Plateau. In Bibb County, it is found in Ketona dolomite glades near the Cahaba River within the Alabama Ridge and Valley physiographic province. Associated woody vegetation includes Juniperus virginiana, Quercus muehlenbergii, Pinus palustris, Sabal minor, and Phyllanthopsis phyllanthoides.

=== Texas ===
Texabama croton is restricted to the eastern Edwards Plateau and southern Cross Timbers within Travis, Bell and Coryell counties. Within this limited range, it has a very patchy distribution and is abundant in the few niches where it occurs and is absent elsewhere. C. alabamensis var. texensis inhabits pockets of deep soils within forested, mesic canyons and upland oak mottes at elevations of 200 to 400 m.

== Phylogeny and evolutionary history ==
Croton alabamensis belongs to the monotypic section Alabamenses within the subgenus Quadrilobi. Its closest relatives inhabit primarily mesic regions in the Neotropics, such as members of the former genus Moacroton, which are restricted to serpentine soils in Cuba. Molecular clock analysis suggests it split from its closest relative in the middle Eocene, approximately 41 million years ago. The Alabama and Texas varieties diverged much more recently in the Quaternary, possibly due to allopatric speciation.

== Cultivation ==
The Alabama croton is grown as an ornamental for its form and foliage and is valued for its drought tolerance, low maintenance, and herbivore resistance. Although normally forming loose clonal colonies, it can be trained as a single-trunked, dense shrub. The plant is hardy to USDA Hardiness Zone 6a. It can be propagated via layering, cuttings and stratified seeds. Cultivated specimens occur at the Mt. Cuba Center in Hockessin, Delaware, the University of Alabama Arboretum in Tuscaloosa, Alabama, the Donald E. Davis Arboretum at Auburn University in Auburn, Alabama, the Scott Arboretum at Swarthmore College in Swarthmore, Pennsylvania, Birmingham Botanical Gardens, the JC Raulston Arboretum at North Carolina State University in Raleigh, North Carolina, the Brooklyn Botanic Garden, Jenkins Arboretum in Devon, Pennsylvania, Texas Discovery Gardens in Dallas, Texas, the Lady Bird Johnson Wildflower Center in Austin, Texas, Atlanta Botanical Garden, the Sarah P. Duke Gardens at Duke University in Durham, North Carolina, and Cheekwood Botanical Garden and Museum of Art in Nashville, Tennessee.

== History ==
Croton alabamensis was discovered in July 1877 by state geologist Eugene Allen Smith on limestone bluffs at Pratt's Ferry near Centreville, Alabama during a geological survey. Specimens of the plant were sent to botanist and pharmacist Charles T. Mohr, who then passed them to botanist Alvan Wentworth Chapman. Chapman formally described C. alabamensis as a new species in the second edition of his Flora of the Southern United States. C. alabamensis var. texensis was discovered in April 1989 at Fort Cavazos in Coryell County by Carol Beardmore and Rex Wahl. Two months later, plants were independently discovered by Chuck Sexton approximately 70 km to the south on the Post Oak Ridge of the future Balcones Canyonlands National Wildlife Refuge in northwestern Travis County. Steve Ginzbarg, a botanist at the University of Texas at Austin, formally described it as a distinct variety of C. alabamensis in 1992.

== Conservation ==
Croton alabamensis and its nominate variety are considered Vulnerable by NatureServe, while C. a. var. texensis is considered Imperiled. Threats include habitat loss and forestry practices. In Alabama, protected populations of the plant occur within The Nature Conservancy's Pratt's Ferry Preserve, the University of West Alabama's Cahaba Biodiversity Center, and the Cahaba River National Wildlife Refuge. In Texas, Balcones Canyonlands National Wildlife Refuge, Pace Bend Park, and Fort Cavazos are home to protected populations of the plant.
