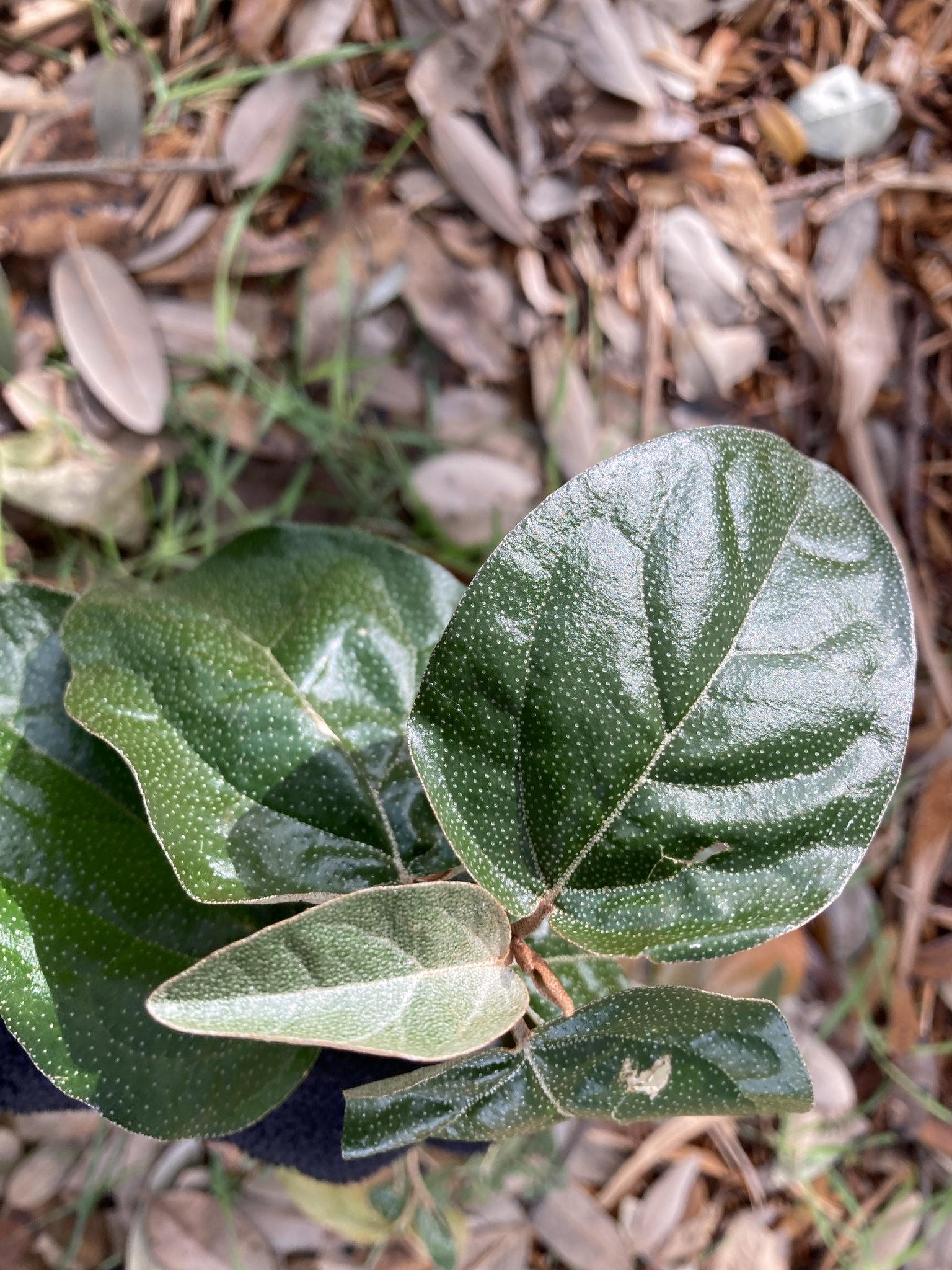

Conservation status
- Imperiled (NatureServe)

Scientific classification
- Kingdom: Plantae
- Clade: Tracheophytes
- Clade: Angiosperms
- Clade: Eudicots
- Clade: Rosids
- Order: Malpighiales
- Family: Euphorbiaceae
- Genus: Croton
- Species: C. alabamensis
- Variety: C. a. var. texensis

Trinomial name
- Croton alabamensis var. texensis Ginzbarg

= Croton alabamensis var. texensis =

Variety of flowering plant

Croton alabamensis var. texensis is a variety of Croton alabamensis that is endemic to the state of Texas in the United States. It is commonly known as the Texabama croton.

== Description ==
Croton alabamensis var. texensis is a multi-stemmed, monoecious shrub typically less than 3 m in height at maturity. Stems are covered in thin grey bark. The indumentum consists of unpigmented silver scales and pigmented copper-colored scales. New stems, petioles, leaf undersides, inflorescences, and floral parts have a coppery sheen because pigmented scales are present. The plant is able to reproduce asexually through layering, eventually forming clonal colonies. Plants are fire-tolerant and will resprout vigorously following wildfire.

=== Leaves ===
The simple, petiolate leaves are arranged spirally and are found at the ends of stems. Blades measure 3.8 to 9 cm in length and 1.5 to 4 cm in width, have entire margins, and are ovate to elliptic. The apex is acute, rounded, or emarginate, while the base is obtuse to slightly cordate. The tops of the leaves are dark green with scattered silver scales. Leaf undersides are completely covered in scales, most of which are unpigmented, and have prominent veins. Although older leaves turn orange in the fall, it is a semi-evergreen plant because the leaves are retained during mild winters.

=== Flowers ===
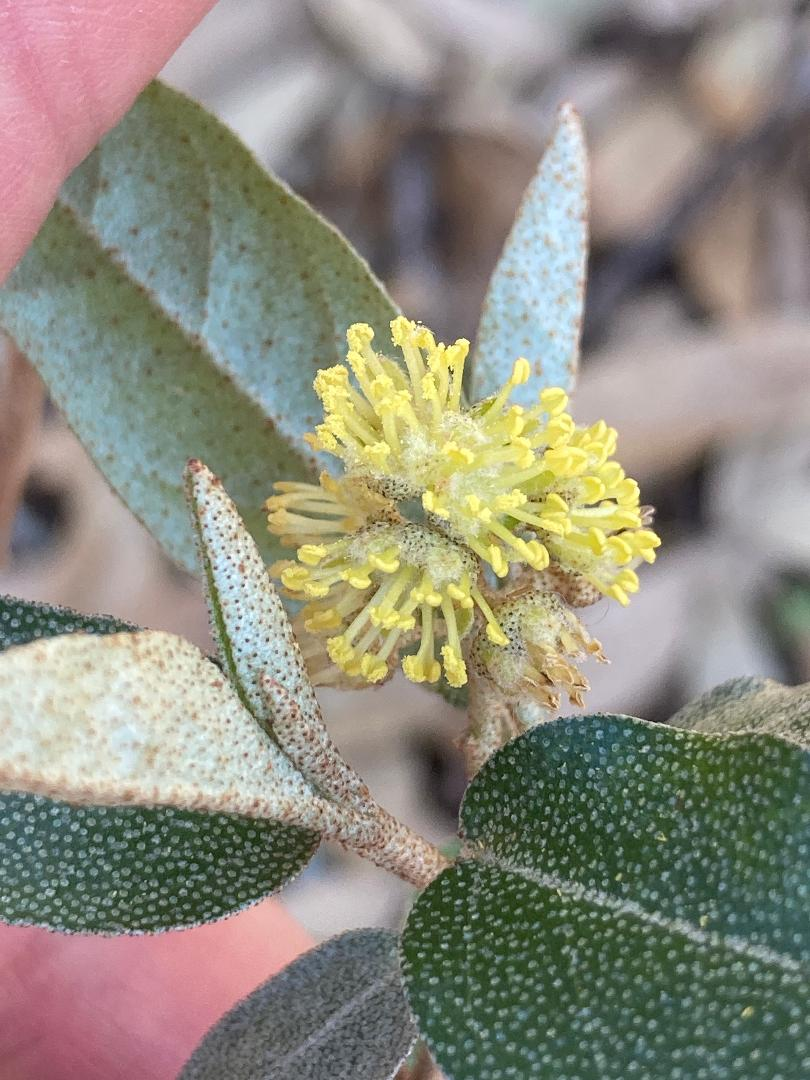
Staminate (male) flower

The inflorescence is a terminal raceme with 6 to 14 inconspicuous flowers formed on buds from the previous year. Racemes have 1 to 6 pistillate (female) flowers near the base and 4 to 12 staminate (male) flowers above; alternatively, all flowers may be of the same sex. Male and female flowers have five petals and five sepals, all of which are scaly on the outer surface. Five orange glands are located immediately inside the sepals. Male flowers have yellowish petals and 14 to 18 stamens. Female flowers have three down-curved style branches above a squat, scaly ovary. The plant is pollinated by insects such as beetles and bees. Flowering occurs mostly from late February until early April.

=== Fruit ===
The fruit is a light brown 3–celled capsule 0.6 to 0.8 cm in length that is borne on a pedicel. Seeds are 6.7 to 7.9 mm long and 5.2 to 6.0 mm wide. They are dark brown to nearly black with white blotches and streaks and have a yellow caruncle below a prominent white keel at the point of attachment. Seeds are explosively dehisced from the capsule. Fruiting occurs between May and June.

== Habitat and range ==
Texabama croton is restricted to the eastern Edwards Plateau and southern Cross Timbers within Travis, Bell and Coryell counties. Within this limited range, it has a very patchy distribution and is abundant in the few niches where it occurs and is absent elsewhere. In addition, it is separated from populations of the nominate variety of C. alabamensis by more than 1000 km. C. alabamensis var. texensis inhabits pockets of deep soils within forested, mesic canyons and upland oak mottes at elevations of 200 to 400 m.

=== Canyon habitat ===
Plants inhabit mesic canyons within Balcones Canyonlands National Wildlife Refuge and Fort Cavazos's Owl Creek Mountains, where it is typically an understory species forming colonies in the shade of trees such as Texas red oak (Quercus buckleyi), chinkapin oak (Q. muehlenbergii), Texas ash (Fraxinus texensis), Arizona walnut (Juglans major), and escarpment black cherry (Prunus serotina var. eximia). It generally grows in moderately alkaline stony clays or clay loams above Cretaceous limestone. Plants growing in full shade are typically longer lived, flower less frequently, and occur at higher densities than those growing in partial shade. Isolated plants occasionally occur in sunny forest margins, where they are stunted and do not flower prolifically. Although bigtooth maple (Acer grandidentatum) and Texabama croton have very similar habitat preferences, they are typically not found growing together. It is believed this is due to competition between the species, with the croton succeeding in canyons that are drier and/or more wildfire-prone and the maple succeeding in more mesic habitat.

=== Upland habitat ===
Plants prefer upland mottes near Lake Travis, where it grows below Texas live oak (Quercus fusiformis) within deep, friable soils.

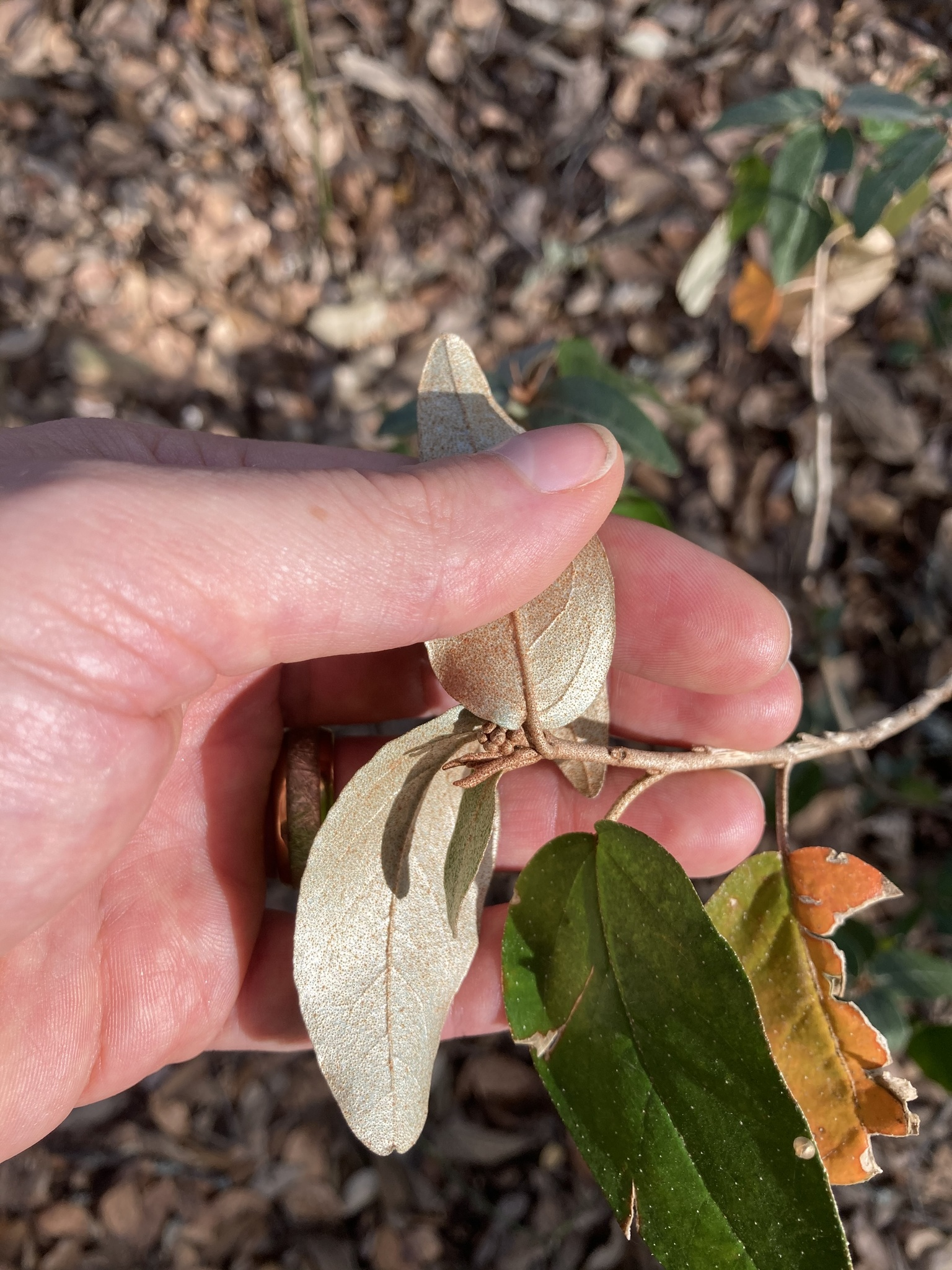
Leaf undersides and fall foliage

== Ecology ==
Beetles have been observed feeding on the pollen of Croton alabamensis var. texensis. Goatweed butterfly (Anaea andria) caterpillars feed on the leaves of the plant. The flowers are visited by adult butterflies of many species, such as the great purple hairstreak (Atlides halesus).

== Evolutionary history ==
Molecular clock analysis suggests Croton alabamensis var. texensis diverged from the nominate variety of C. alabamensis in the Quaternary. Allopatric speciation has been proposed as a mechanism to explain the divergence of the varieties. In this theory, geographically intermediate populations between the species current range of Texas and Alabama gradually became extirpated.

== Conservation ==
Croton alabamensis var. texensis is considered an Imperiled variety by NatureServe. It is primarily threatened by suburban development. Texabama croton is one of 27 species of concern protected by the Balcones Canyonlands Conservation Plan. Protected populations of the plant occur within Balcones Canyonlands National Wildlife Refuge, Pace Bend Park, and Fort Cavazos, which has a population of around 20,000 plants. Staff of the Lady Bird Johnson Wildflower Center have collected seeds of the plant for storage at the National Laboratory for Genetic Resources Preservation in Fort Collins, Colorado.

== History ==
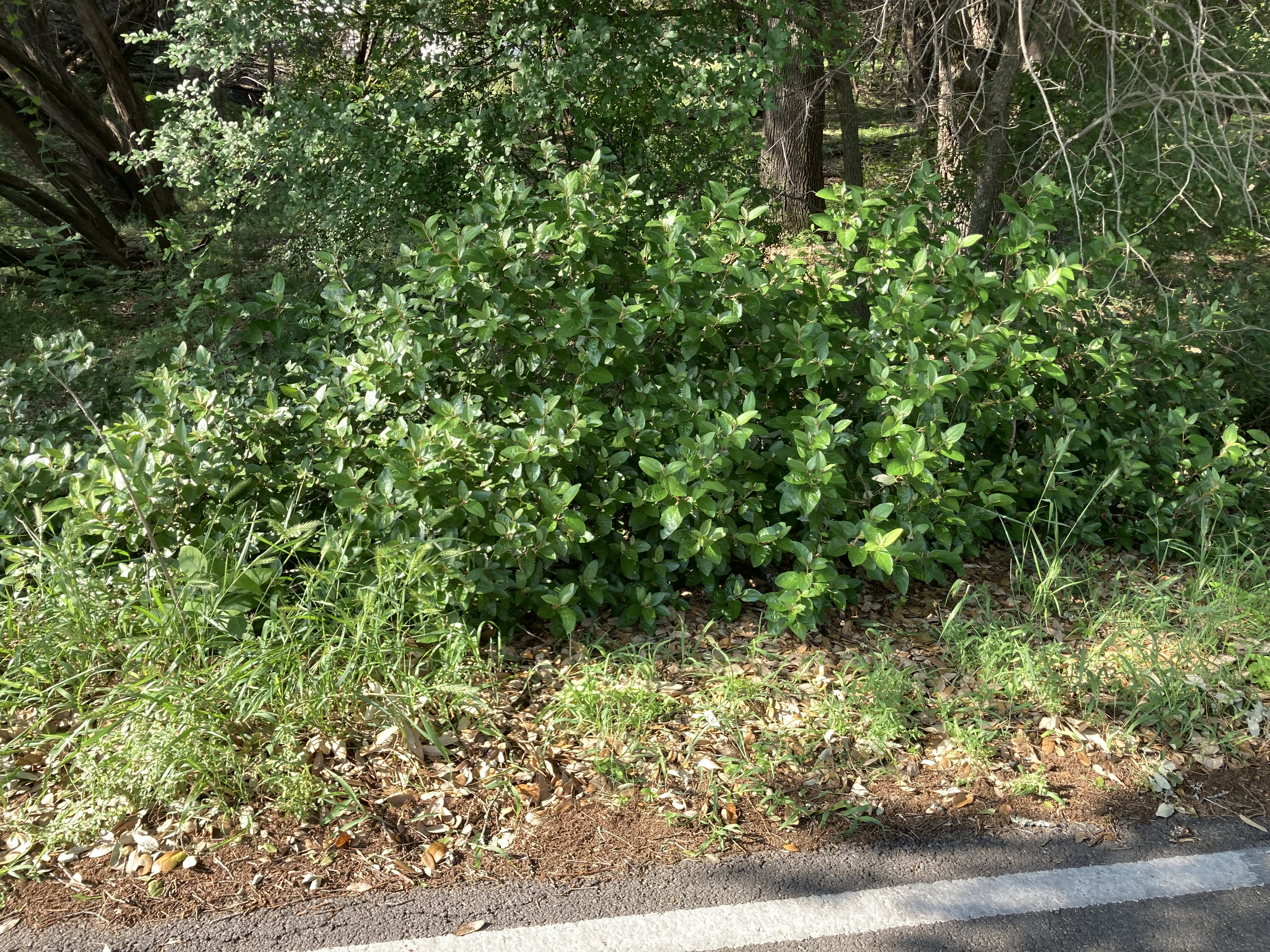
Habitus in oak motte near Lake Travis

Texabama croton was discovered in April 1989 at Fort Cavazos in Coryell County by Carol Beardmore and Rex Wahl. Two months later, plants were independently discovered by Chuck Sexton approximately 70 km to the south on the Post Oak Ridge of the future Balcones Canyonlands National Wildlife Refuge in northwestern Travis County. Steve Ginzbarg, a botanist at the University of Texas at Austin, formally described it as a distinct variety of C. alabamensis in 1992.

== Cultivation ==
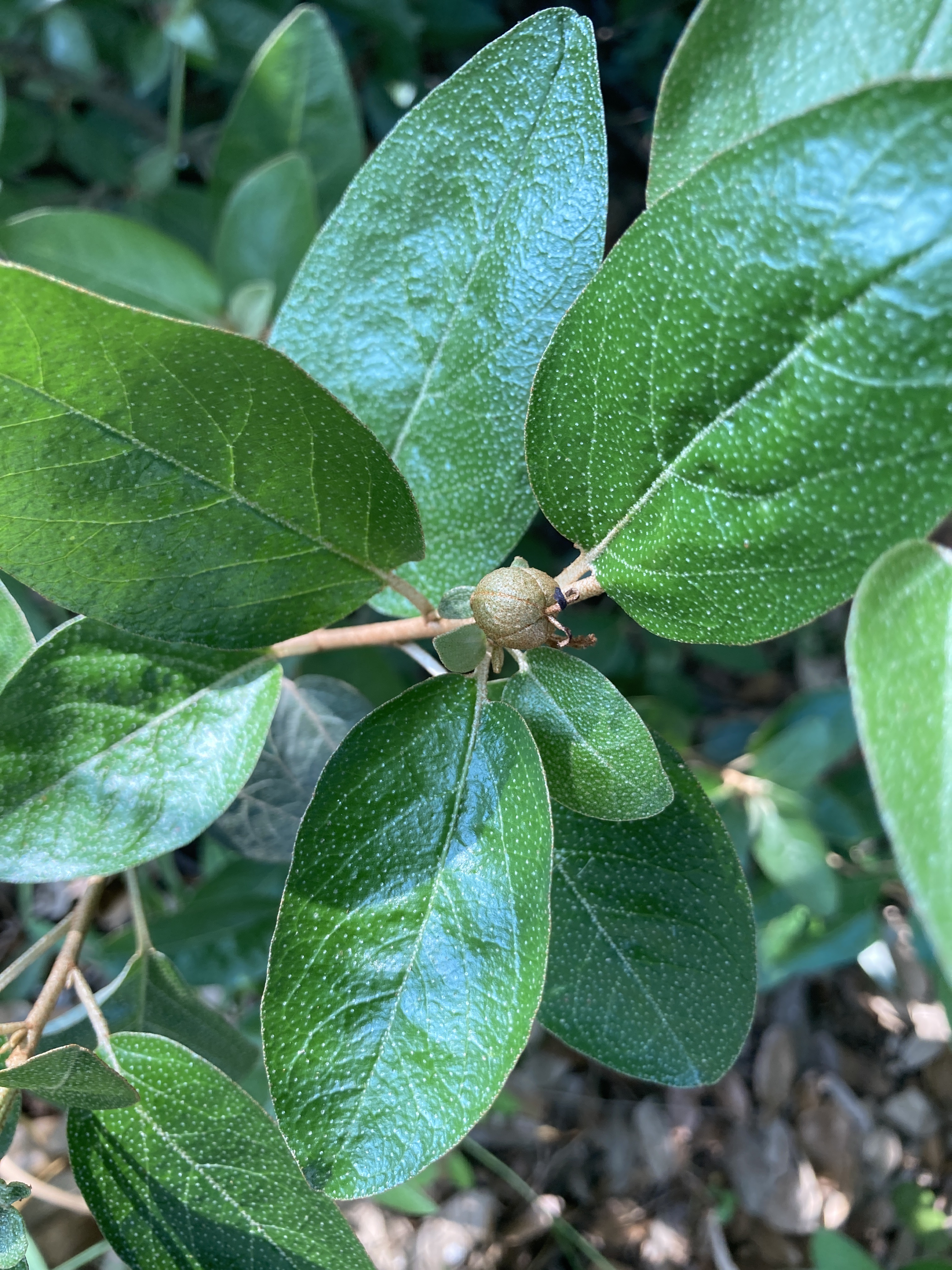
Leaves and capsule

Texabama croton is valued as an ornamental plant for its attractive, spicily aromatic foliage and propensity to form airy thickets when grown in shade. If cultivated in full sun with irrigation, plants will grow into dense shrubs. Plants can be propagated from stratified seed and softwood cuttings. Cultivated specimens exist at the Lady Bird Johnson Wildflower Center.
