= Carex baltzellii =

Scientific classification
- Kingdom: Plantae
- Clade: Tracheophytes
- Clade: Angiosperms
- Clade: Monocots
- Clade: Commelinids
- Order: Poales
- Family: Cyperaceae
- Genus: Carex
- Species: C. baltzellii

Binomial name
- Carex baltzellii Chapm.

Synonyms
- Carex chapmanii Torr. ex Boott

Species of grass-like plant

Carex baltzellii, Baltzell's sedge, is a species of flowering plant in the family Cyperaceae, native to the US states of Mississippi, Alabama, Florida, and Georgia. A rare species, it is found only on the slopes of forested ravines.
