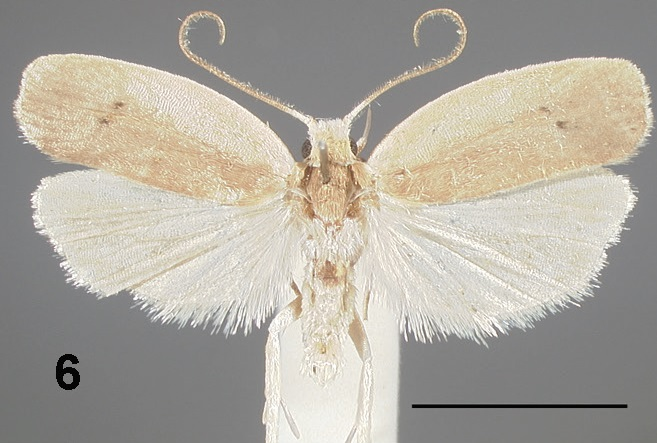

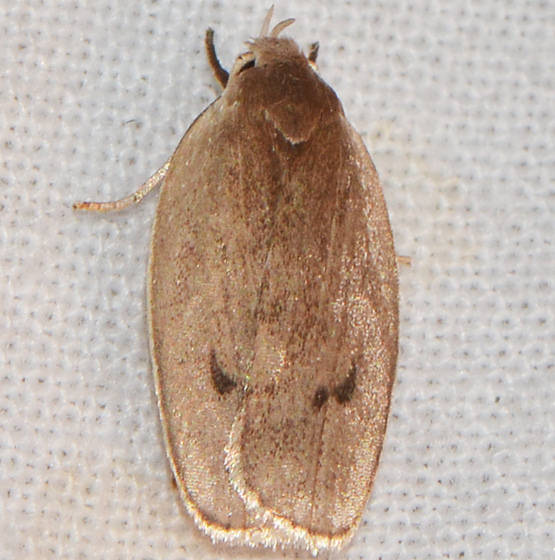

Scientific classification
- Domain: Eukaryota
- Kingdom: Animalia
- Phylum: Arthropoda
- Class: Insecta
- Order: Lepidoptera
- Family: Depressariidae
- Genus: Antaeotricha
- Species: A. osseella

Binomial name
- Antaeotricha osseella (Walsingham, 1889)

Synonyms
- Ide osseella Walsingham, 1889; Brachyloma querciella Busck, 1908

= Antaeotricha osseella =

Species of moth

Antaeotricha osseella is a moth of the family Depressariidae. It is found in North America, where it has been recorded from New York, New Jersey, North Carolina, South Carolina, West Virginia, Maryland, District of Columbia, Massachusetts, Pennsylvania, Illinois, Arkansas, Missouri, Texas and California.

The wingspan is about 16–18 mm.

The larvae feed on Quercus alba and Quercus muehlenbergii.
