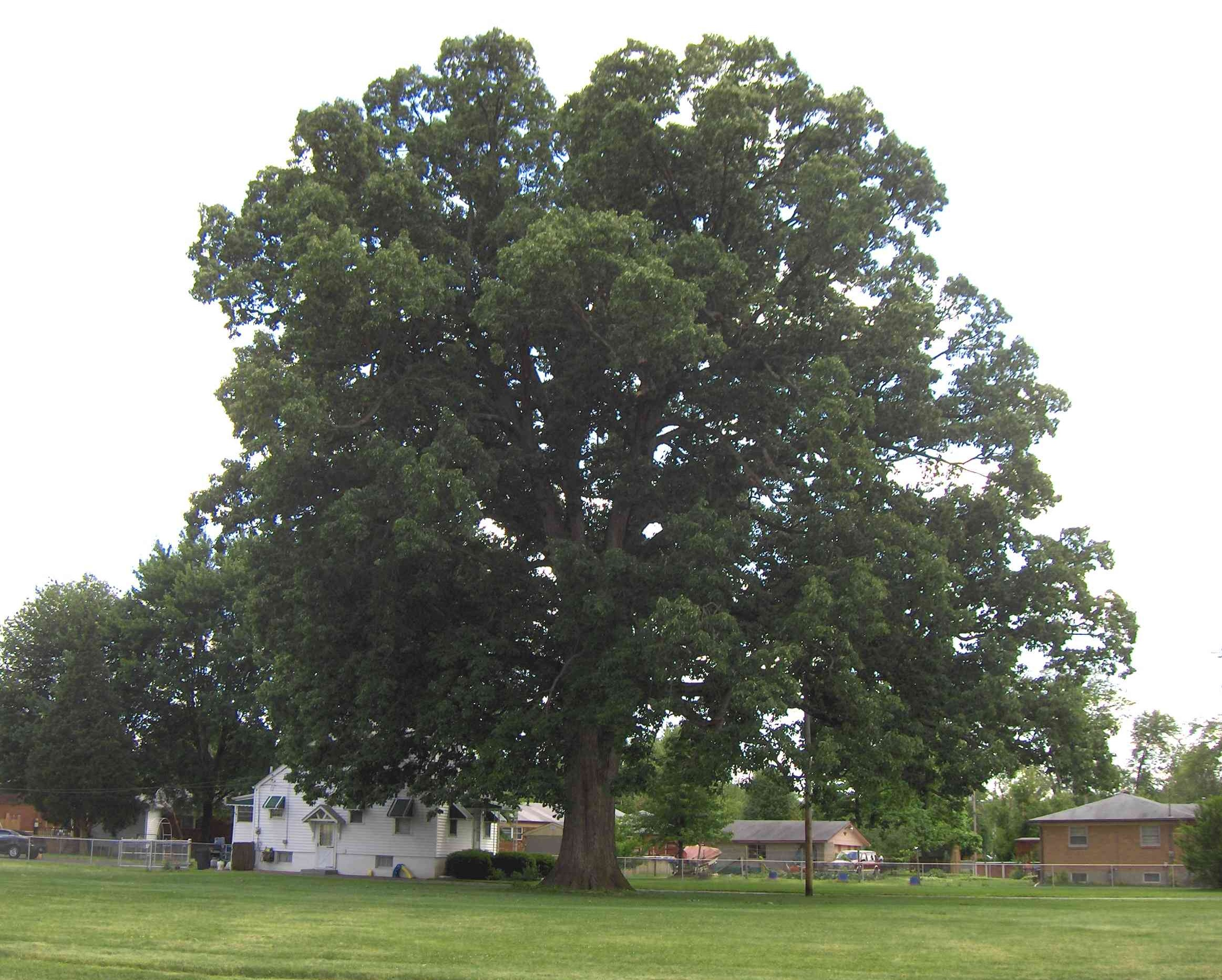
- A mature swamp chestnut oak
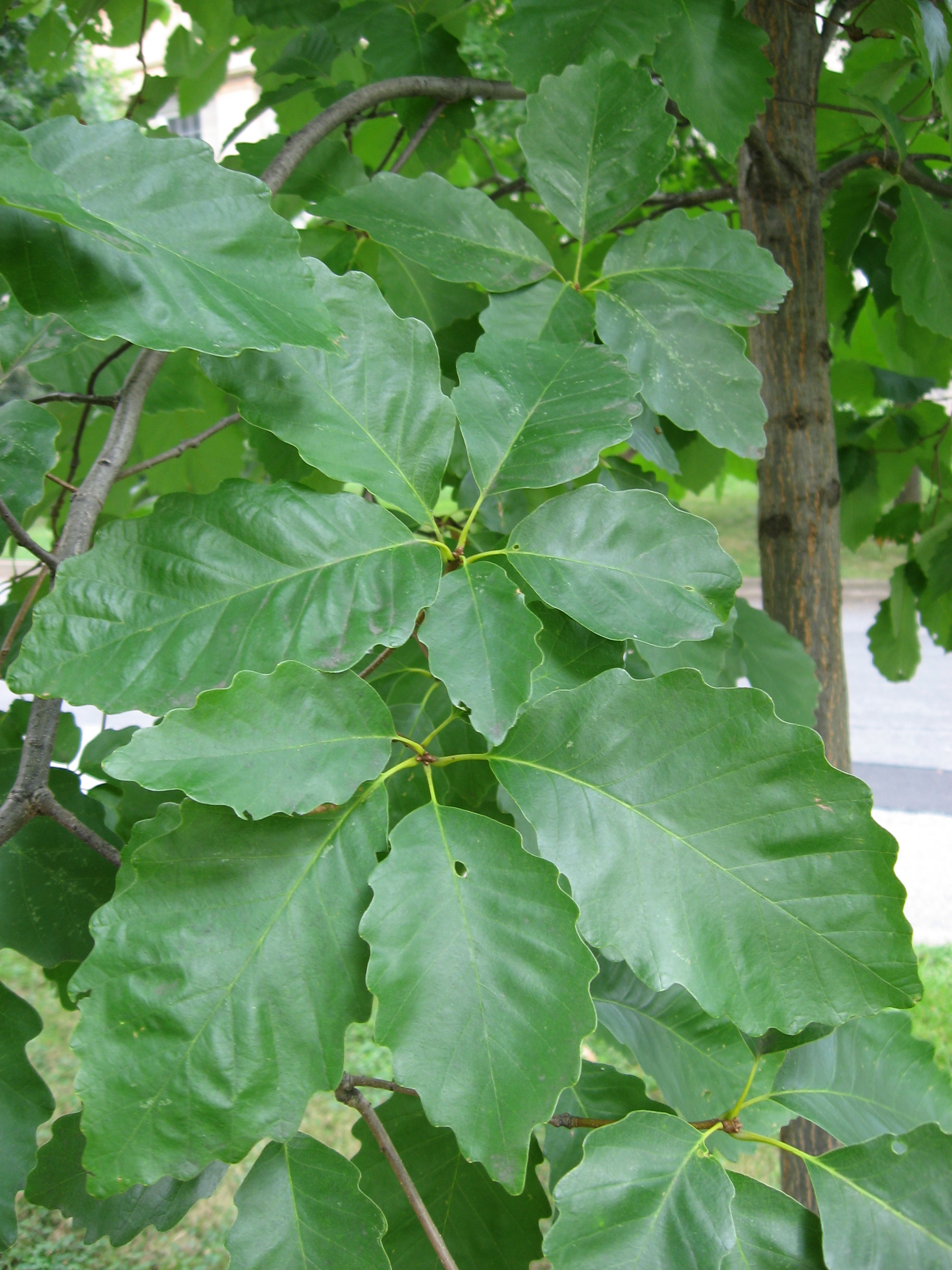

Conservation status
- Least Concern (IUCN 3.1)

Scientific classification
- Kingdom: Plantae
- Clade: Embryophytes
- Clade: Tracheophytes
- Clade: Spermatophytes
- Clade: Angiosperms
- Clade: Eudicots
- Clade: Rosids
- Order: Fagales
- Family: Fagaceae
- Genus: Quercus
- Subgenus: Quercus subg. Quercus
- Section: Quercus sect. Quercus
- Species: Q. michauxii

Binomial name
- Quercus michauxii Nutt.
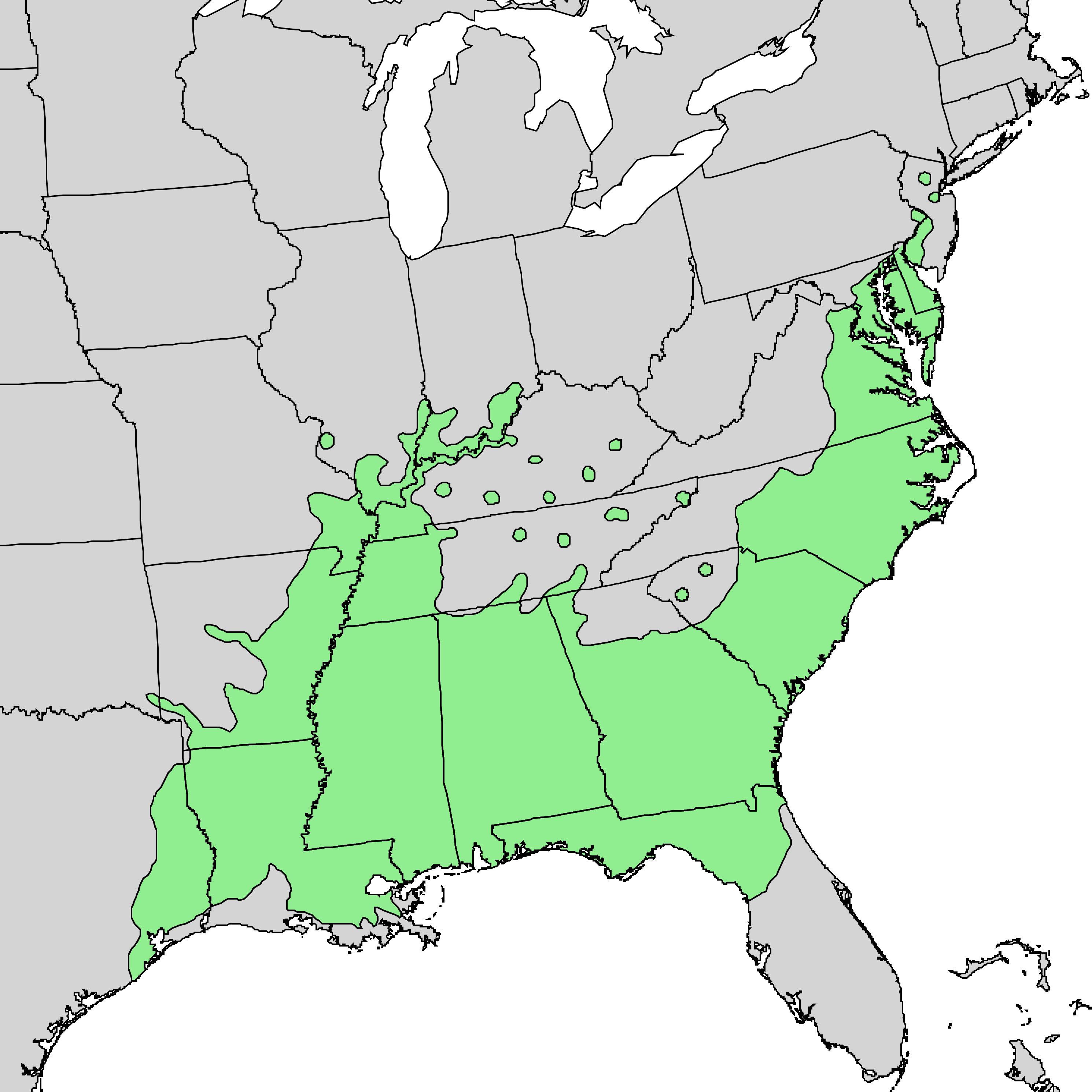
- Natural range of Quercus michauxii

Synonyms
- Quercus bicolor var. michauxii (Nutt.) Chapm.; Quercus bicolor subsp. michauxii (Nutt.) Sarg.; Quercus houstoniana C.H.Mull.

= Quercus michauxii =

Swamp chestnut oak

Species of oak tree

Quercus michauxii, the swamp chestnut oak, is a species of oak in the white oak section Quercus section Quercus in the beech family. It is native to bottomlands and wetlands in the southeastern and midwestern United States, in coastal states from New Jersey to Texas, inland primarily in the Mississippi–Ohio Valley as far as Oklahoma, Missouri, Illinois, and Indiana.

== Description ==
The leaves of the swamp chestnut oak are simple (not compound), 4–11 inches (10–28 centimetres) long and 2–7 in (5–18 cm) broad, with 15–20 lobe-like, rounded simple teeth on each side, similar to those of chestnut oak and chinkapin oak (Quercus muehlenbergii), although they generally do not achieve the more slender form that the leaves of those trees may exhibit at times. The leaves turn red in autumn. The fruit is an acorn 2.5–3.5 cm (1–1 1/2 in) long and 2–2.5 cm (3/4–1 in) broad, borne on a 2–3 cm peduncle, maturing in the fall, about 6 months after pollination. The tree only bears heavy acorn crops at intervals of several years.

== Taxonomy ==
The swamp chestnut oak closely resembles the chestnut oak (Quercus montana), and for that reason has sometimes been treated as a variety of that species. However, the swamp chestnut oak is a larger tree which differs in preferred habitat, and the bark does not have the distinctive deep, rugged ridging of the chestnut oak, being thinner, scaly, and paler gray. It typically grows to around 65 ft (20 m) tall, though the tallest specimen currently known is over 150 ft (42 m) tall.

The name Q. prinus was long used by many botanists and foresters for the swamp chestnut oak, even when treated as a species distinct from the chestnut oak, which was then called Q. montana, but the application of the name Q. prinus to the chestnut oak is now often accepted, although sometimes that name is declared to be of uncertain position, unassignable to either species, with the chestnut oak then called Q. montana, as in the Flora of North America.

== Ecology ==
The acorns of the swamp chestnut oak are eaten by generalist species like chipmunks, squirrels, white-tail deer, wild hogs, and black bears. They are also readily eaten by cattle, and the species is sometimes called the "cow oak" for this reason.

== Uses ==
The wood of the swamp chestnut oak is similar to, and usually marketed mixed with, that of other white oaks. Swamp chestnut oak is also called basket oak, since the wood is easily split into long, thin, flexible strips excellent for basket weaving. The swamp chestnut oak's acorns are large, relatively sweet, and edible.

The swamp chestnut oak is sometimes cultivated as a large garden tree or street tree, and is quite easy to grow if it is not subject to extreme urban conditions. The current National Champion Swamp Chestnut Oak is in the Stumpy Lake area in Virginia Beach, Virginia. It is 123 ft (37 m) high, with a crown of 109 ft (33 m) and a circumference of 23 ft (7 m).
