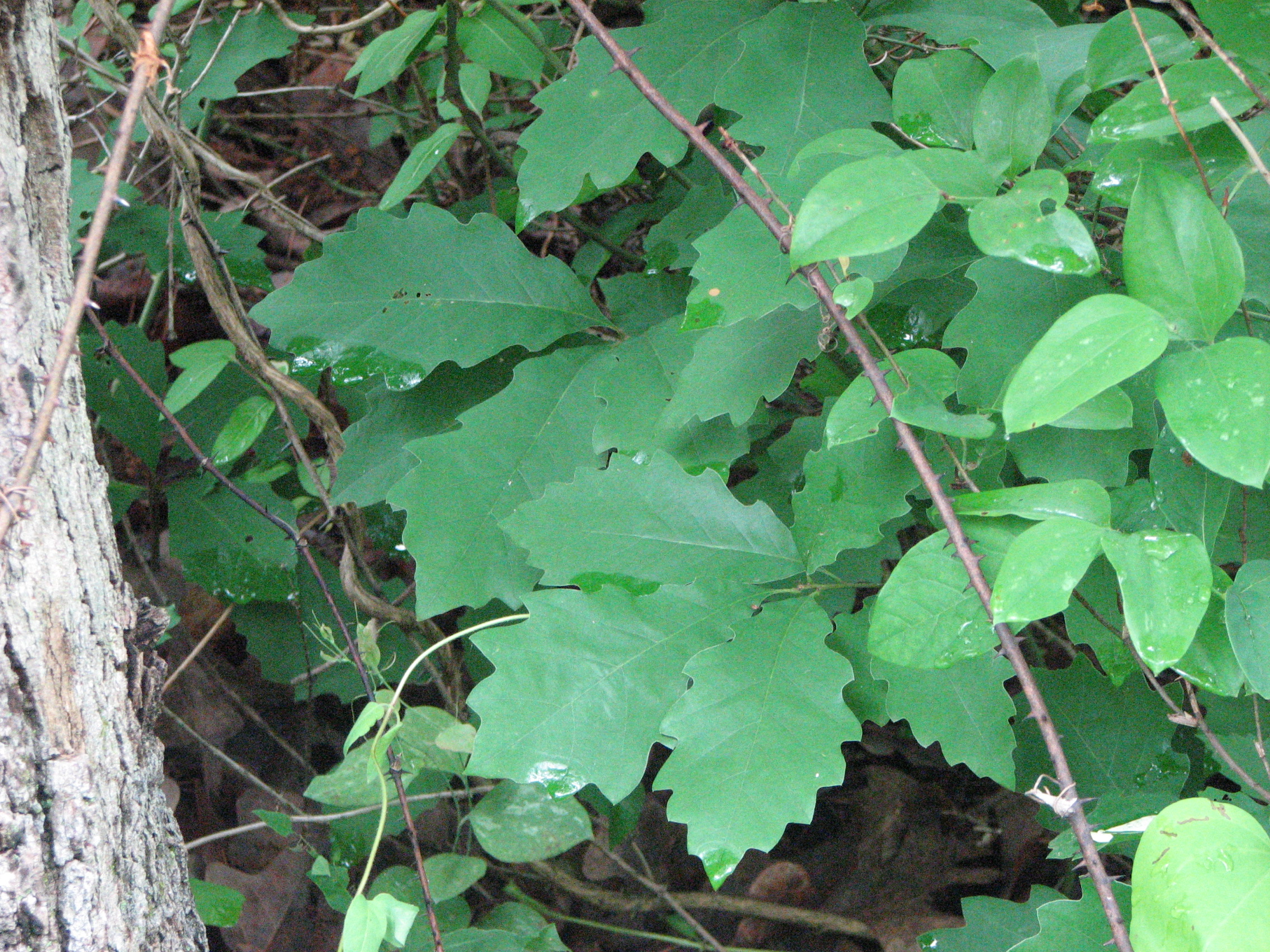
- The leaves of Q. prinoides (center) resemble those of Q. prinus.

Conservation status
- Least Concern (IUCN 3.1)

Scientific classification
- Kingdom: Plantae
- Clade: Embryophytes
- Clade: Tracheophytes
- Clade: Angiosperms
- Clade: Eudicots
- Clade: Rosids
- Order: Fagales
- Family: Fagaceae
- Genus: Quercus
- Subgenus: Quercus subg. Quercus
- Section: Quercus sect. Quercus
- Species: Q. prinoides

Binomial name
- Quercus prinoides Willd.
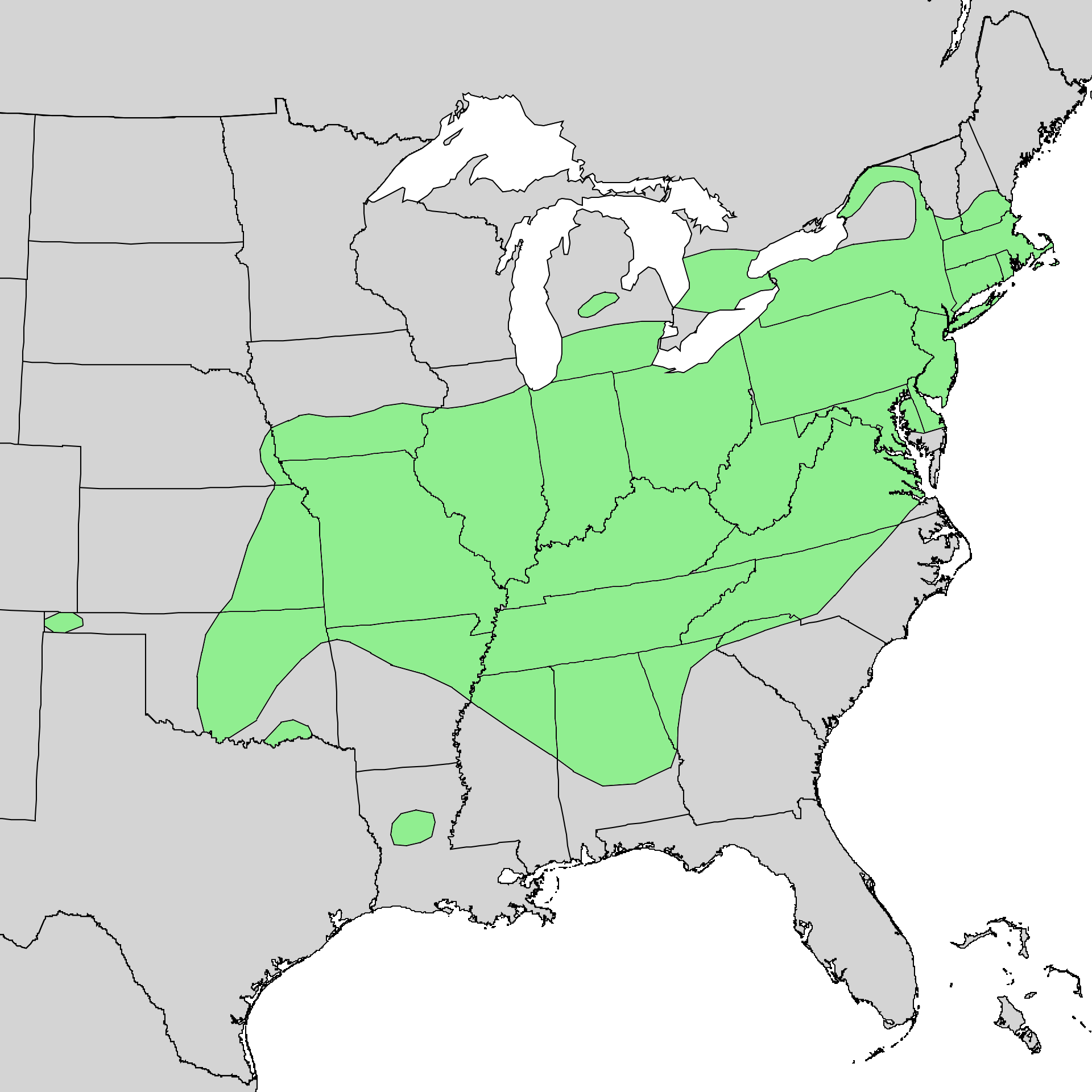
- Range map

Synonyms
- List: Quercus castanea var. prinoides (Willd.) Muhl. ex Engelm.; Quercus chincapin (F.Michx.) Raf.; Quercus chinquapin Pursh; Quercus muehlenbergii var. humilis (Marshall) Britton; Quercus prinoides Raf.; Quercus prinoides var. rufescens Rehder; Quercus prinoides f. rufescens (Rehder) House; Quercus prinus var. chincapin F.Michx.; Quercus prinus var. humilis Marshall; Quercus prinus var. pumila Michx.; Quercus rufescens (Rehder) E.P.Bicknell

= Quercus prinoides =

Species of plant

Quercus prinoides, commonly known as dwarf chinkapin oak, dwarf chinquapin oak, dwarf chestnut oak or scrub chestnut oak, is a shrubby, clone-forming oak native to central-eastern North America.

== Description ==
The dwarf chinkapin oak is a shrub or small tree that typically grows up to 13–20 feet (4–6 meters) tall and 13–20 ft (4–6 m) wide. It sometimes spreads vegetatively by means of underground rhizomes. The leaves of dwarf chinkapin oak closely resemble those of chinkapin oak, but are smaller: 5–15 centimeters (2–6 inches) long, compared to 10–18 cm (4–7 in) long for chinkapin oak. The acorns are 15–25 millimeters (1/2–1 in) long, with the cup enclosing about half of the acorn.

While similar in foliage and fruits, but with smaller leaves, the dwarf chinkapin oak may also be distinguished from the chinkapin oak by differences in growth habit (the clonally spreading shrubby growth form and smaller proportions of dwarf chinkapin oak, even when grown on rich soils) and habitat (the chinkapin oak is typically found on rocky, calcareous sites, while the dwarf chinkapin oak is more typically found on dry, often acidic, sandy soils or dry shales).

== Taxonomy ==
Quercus prinoides was named and described by the German botanist Karl (Carl) Ludwig Willdenow in 1801, in a German journal article by the German-American Pennsylvania botanist Gotthilf Heinrich Ernst Muhlenberg. The epithet prinoides refers to its resemblance to Quercus prinus, the chestnut oak.

However, this shrubby oak, now generally accepted as a distinct species, is more closely related to chinkapin oak (Q. muhlenbergii) than to chestnut oak. These two kinds of oak have sometimes been considered to be conspecific (belonging to the same species), in which case the earlier-published name Q. prinoides has priority, with the larger chinkapin oak then usually classified as Quercus prinoides var. acuminata and the shrubby form as Q. prinoides var. prinoides.

== Distribution ==
The species range extends from eastern Nebraska, south to Oklahoma (with an isolated population in Louisiana), east to northern Alabama and Georgia, northeast to New Hampshire, and in southeast Canada, extending as far north as the Carolinian forest zone of southern Ontario. It has a virtually disjunct (discontinuous) distribution, fairly common in New England and in the Appalachian Mountains, and also in the eastern Great Plains but rare in the Ohio Valley in between.

== Ecology and uses ==
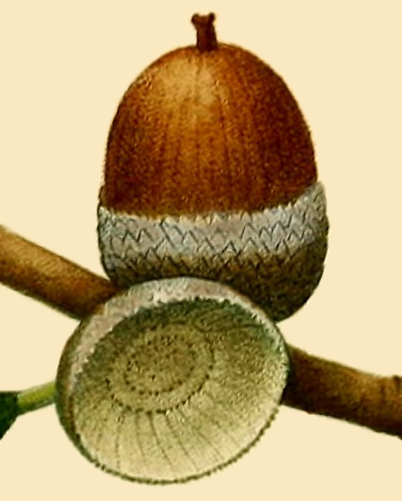
A dwarf chinkapin oak acorn, detail from an engraving after Pancrace Bessa, ca. 1812.

The acorns of dwarf chinkapin oak are sweet tasting and relished by humans and many kinds of wildlife, such as deer, turkeys, squirrels, chipmunks, and mice, each reliant on the nutritional value of chestnut oak acorns as a component of their diet. The wood has little commercial value because of the shrub's small size.
