= Flora of the Southern United States =

1860 text

Flora of the Southern United States was the first comprehensive treatment of flora of the southeastern United States. It was written by Alvan Wentworth Chapman and published in 1860.

== See also ==
- Flora of the Southeastern United States
- Flora (publication)
