= Balcones Canyonlands National Wildlife Refuge =

National Wildlife Refuge in Texas

Balcones Canyonlands
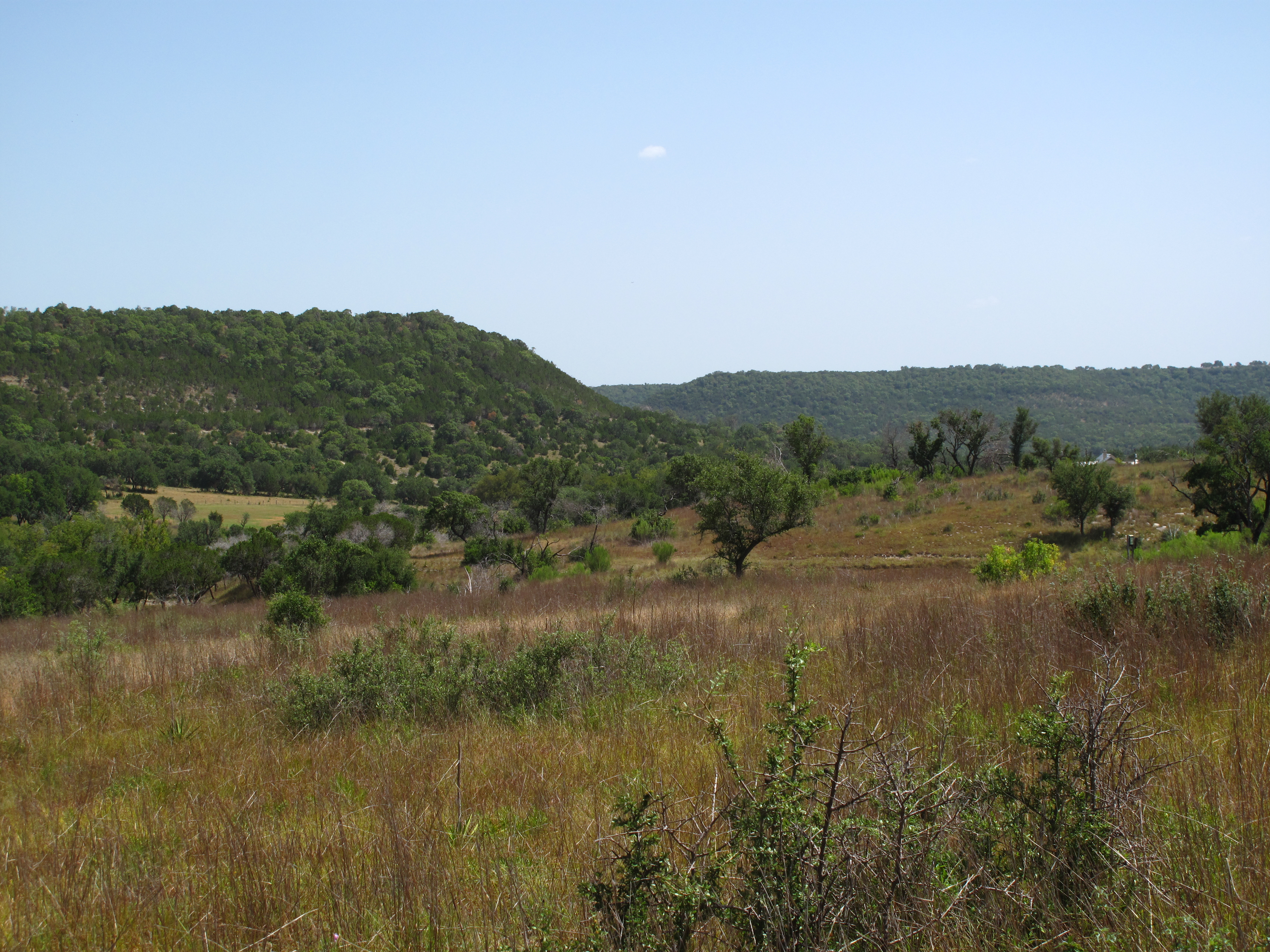
- Balcones Canyonlands National Wildlife Refuge

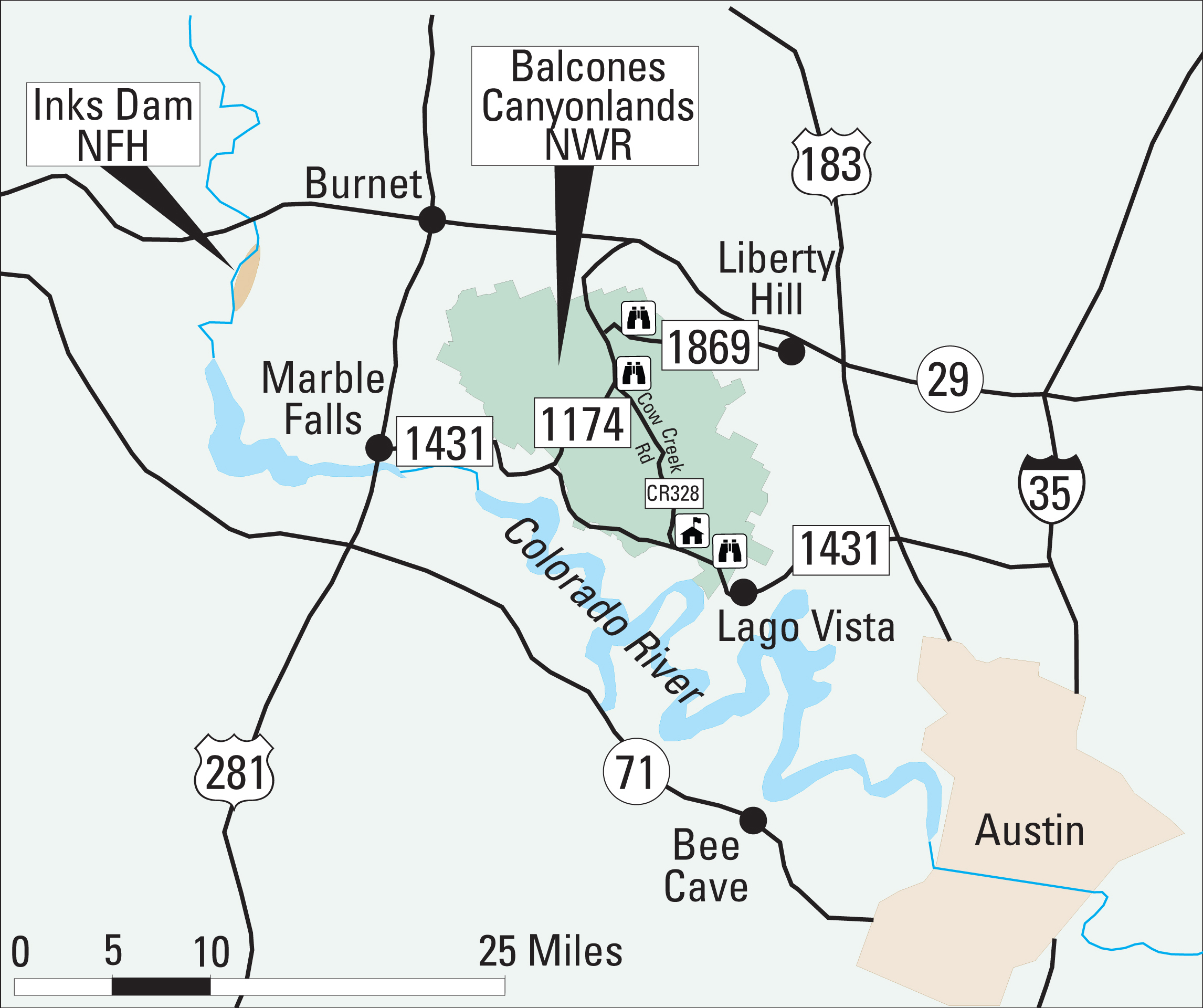
- Map of refuge
- Location: Lago Vista, Texas, Texas Hill Country, Texas, United States
- Coordinates: 30°37′21″N 98°04′06″W
- Area: 186 km^{2} (72 sq mi)
- Established: 1992
- Operator: United States Fish and Wildlife Service
- Website: Balcones Canyonlands National Wildlife Refuge

Balcones Canyonlands is a national wildlife refuge located in the Texas Hill Country to the northwest of Lago Vista, Texas. The refuge was formed in 1992 to conserve habitat for two endangered songbirds, the golden-cheeked warbler (Setophaga chrysoparia) and the black-capped vireo (Vireo atricapilla), and to preserve Texas Hill Country habitat for numerous other wildlife species. The refuge augments a similarly named preserve in Austin called the Balcones Canyonlands Preserve.

The refuge is located within a deeply dissected portion of the Edwards Plateau that contains many steep-banked streams and canyons. The canyons facing Austin are deeply etched into the limestone of the Edwards Plateau by tributaries of the Colorado River.

Beneath the surface of the Edwards Plateau lies an underground labyrinth of caves, sinkholes, and springs. Various spiders, beetles, and other creatures inhabit this below-ground world, and are unique to this area of Texas. Even deeper below the surface lies the Edwards Aquifer, which stores billions of gallons of water and supplies drinking water for almost one million people. The aquifer is also the source of many springs that feed Hill Country rivers, which eventually flow into the marshes, estuaries, and bays along the Texas Gulf Coast.

The vegetation found in the Hill Country includes various oaks, elms, and Ashe juniper trees (often referred to as "cedars" in Texas). The endangered golden-cheeked warbler and black-capped vireo depend on different successional stages of this vegetation. Both of these birds nest in the Edwards Plateau, the warbler exclusively.

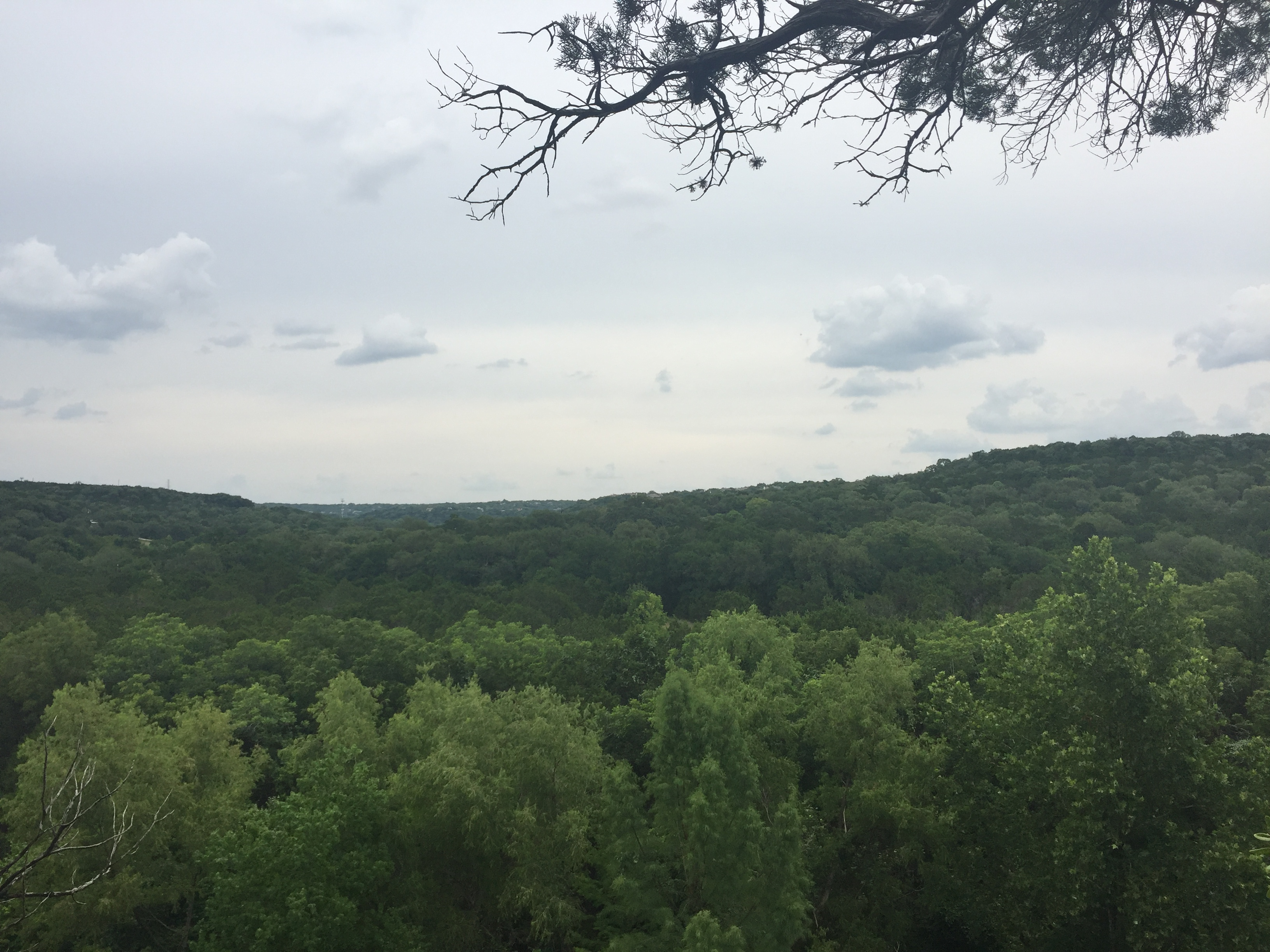
vista of Balcones Canyonlands National Wildlife Refuge

== Gallery ==
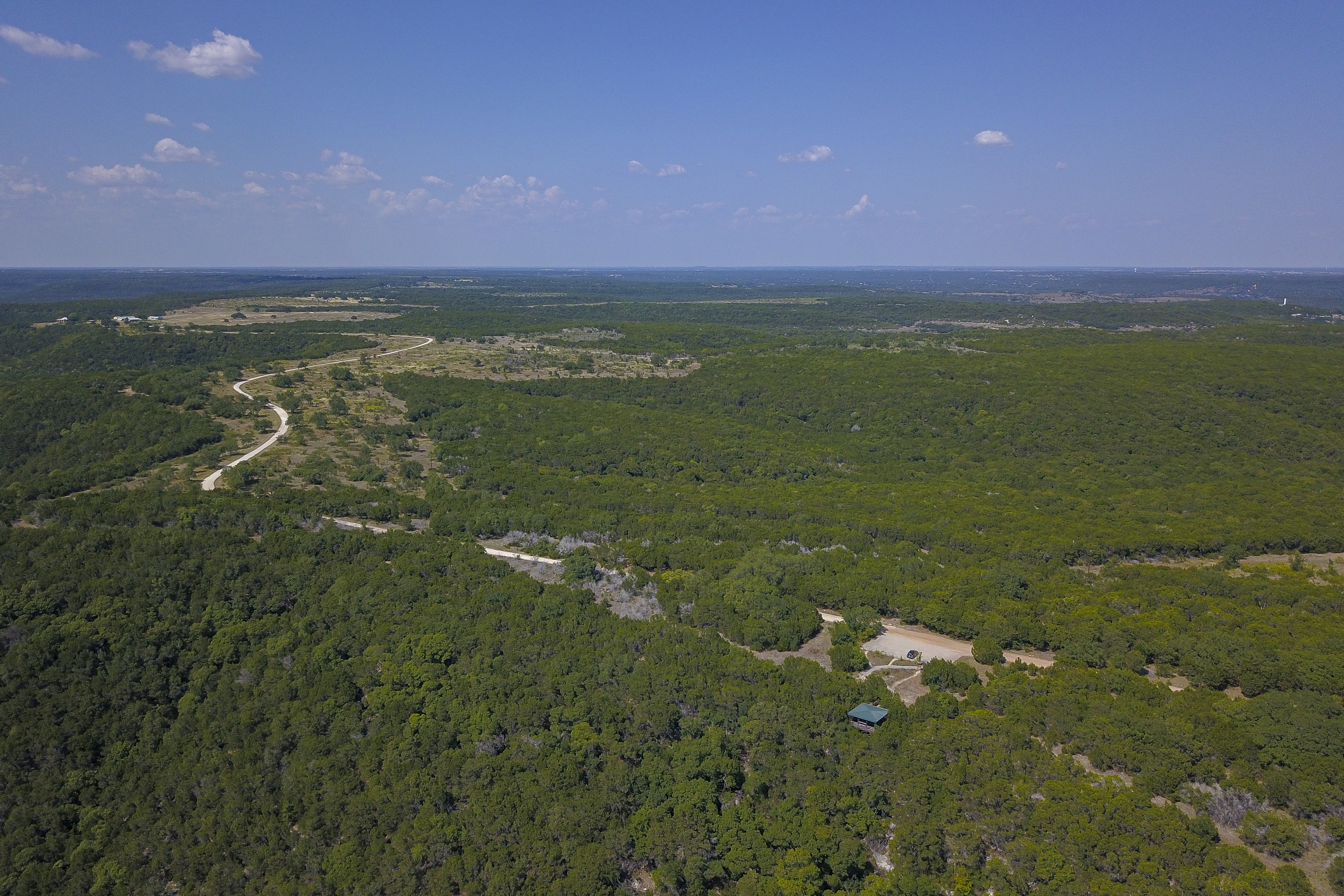
Warbler Vista Observation Deck and the National Wildlife Refuge

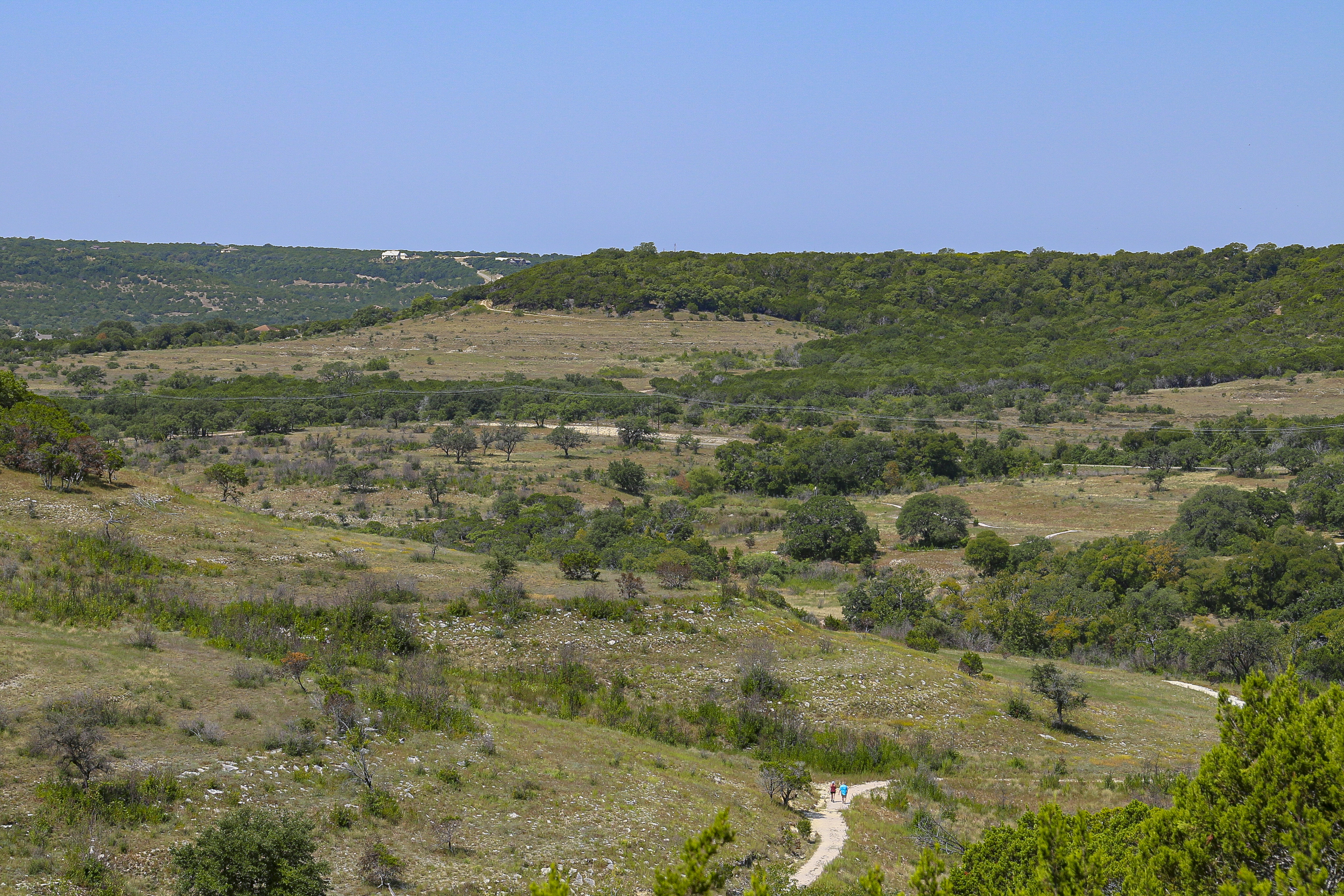
View towards the Doeskin Ranch trailhead

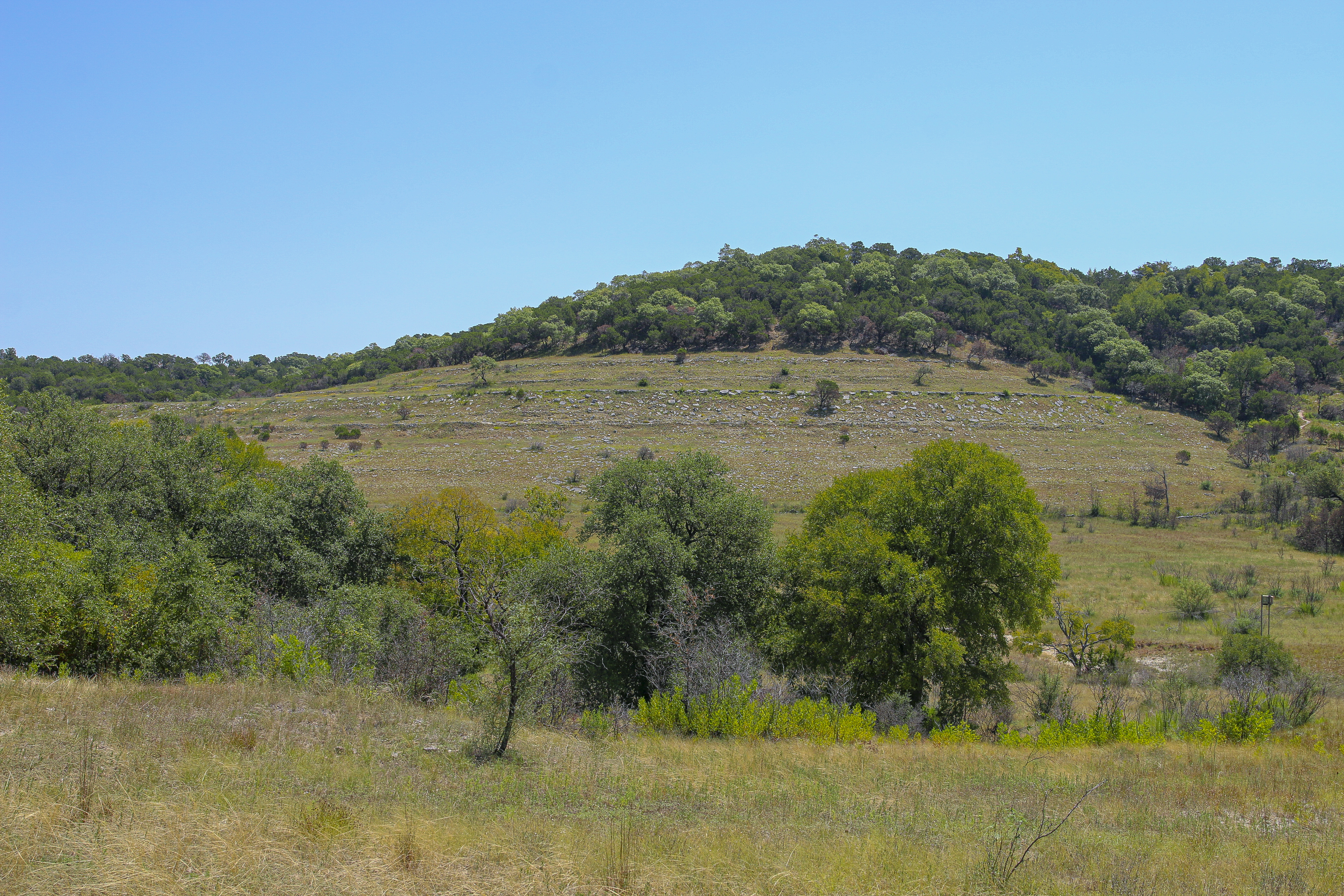
Layers of rock at Doeskin Ranch

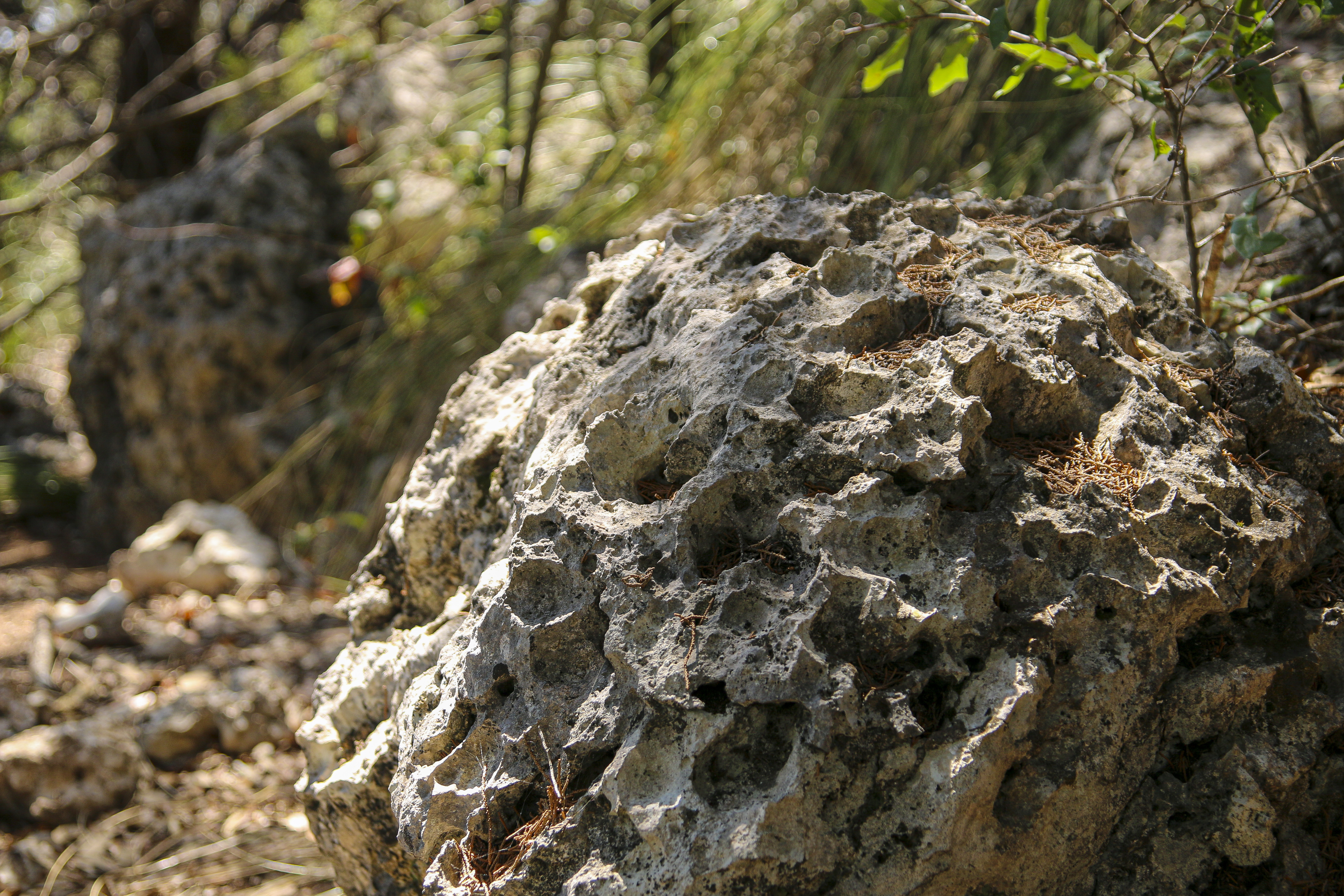
Limestone rock showing its honeycomb-like structure, near Warbler Vista

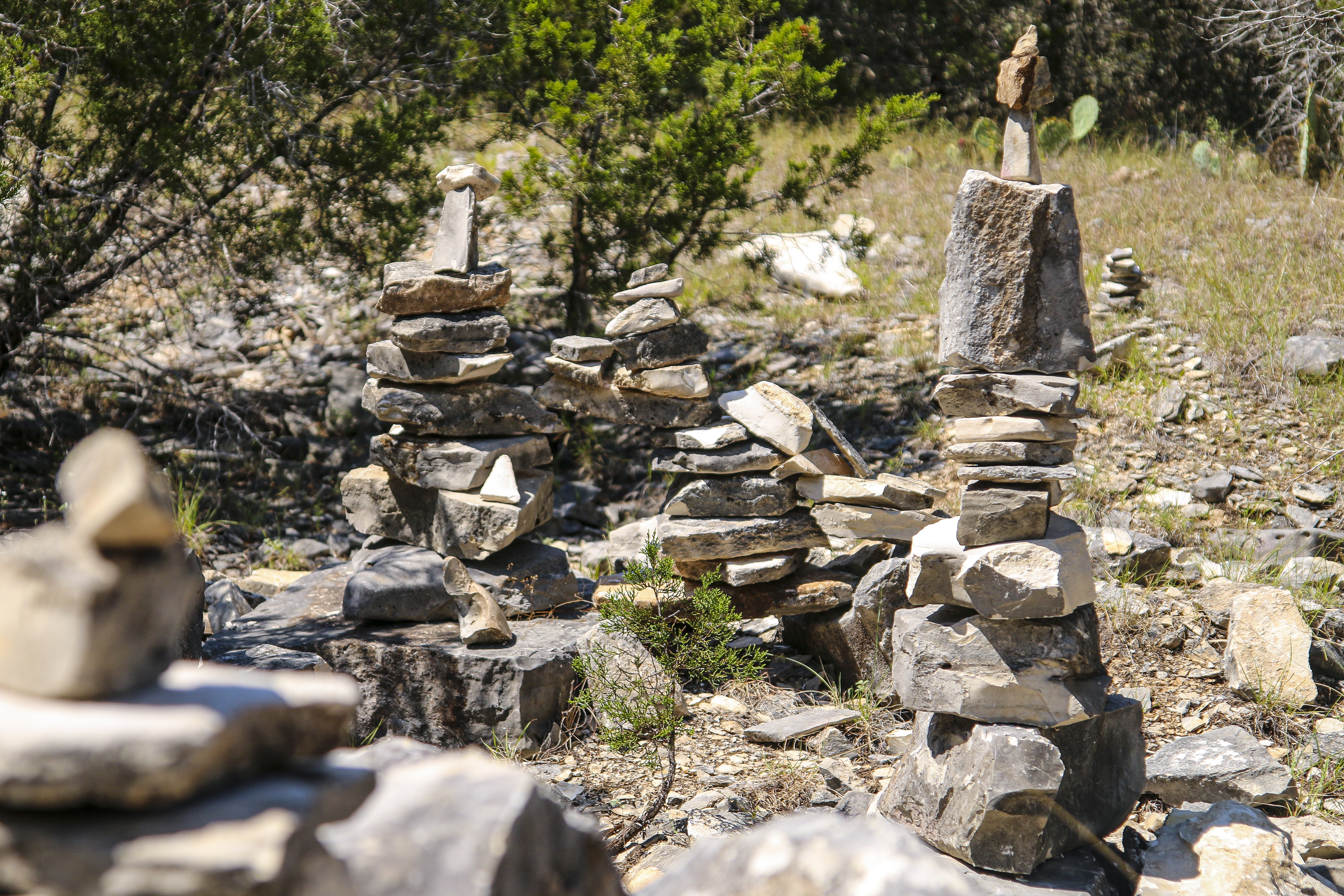
Stacks of Edwards Limestone pieces put up by hikers, near Warbler Vista

== See also ==
- Balcones Fault
- Barton Creek
- Colorado Bend State Park
- Colorado River (Texas)
- Llano Uplift
- Mount Bonnell
- Pedernales River
- Texas Hill Country
