= Alvan Wentworth Chapman =

American botanist and physician (1809–1899)

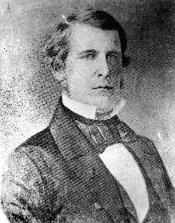
- Alvan Wentworth Chapman, circa 1855
- Born: September 28, 1809; Southampton, Massachusetts, U.S.
- Died: April 6, 1899 (aged 89)
- Scientific career
- Fields: Medicine; Botany
- Author abbrev. (botany): Chapm.

Alvan Wentworth Chapman (September 28, 1809 – April 6, 1899) was an American physician and pioneering botanist in the study of flora of the American Southeast. He wrote Flora of the Southern United States, the first comprehensive description of U.S. plants in any region beyond the northeastern states.

== Life ==
Chapman was born in Southampton, Massachusetts, the youngest of five children. In 1830, he graduated from Amherst College with a degree in classics. He moved to Georgia and then Florida where he held various teaching positions, and he married Mary Ann Hancock in 1839. In the early 1840s, he received a medical education, acquiring his MD in 1846. In 1847, he settled in Apalachicola, Florida, remaining there for the rest of his life working as a physician and botanist, collaborating with Asa Gray.

== Works ==
His botanical interest seems to have started when he lived in Georgia, adjacent to the botanically unexplored regions of northern Florida. Working in near isolation, in his spare time, he had a manuscript by 1859 and visited Harvard University for five months, consulting with Gray and arranging for publication of his Flora of the Southern United States, which occurred in 1860. Chapman brought out a second edition in 1884 and a third edition in 1897.

== Legacy ==
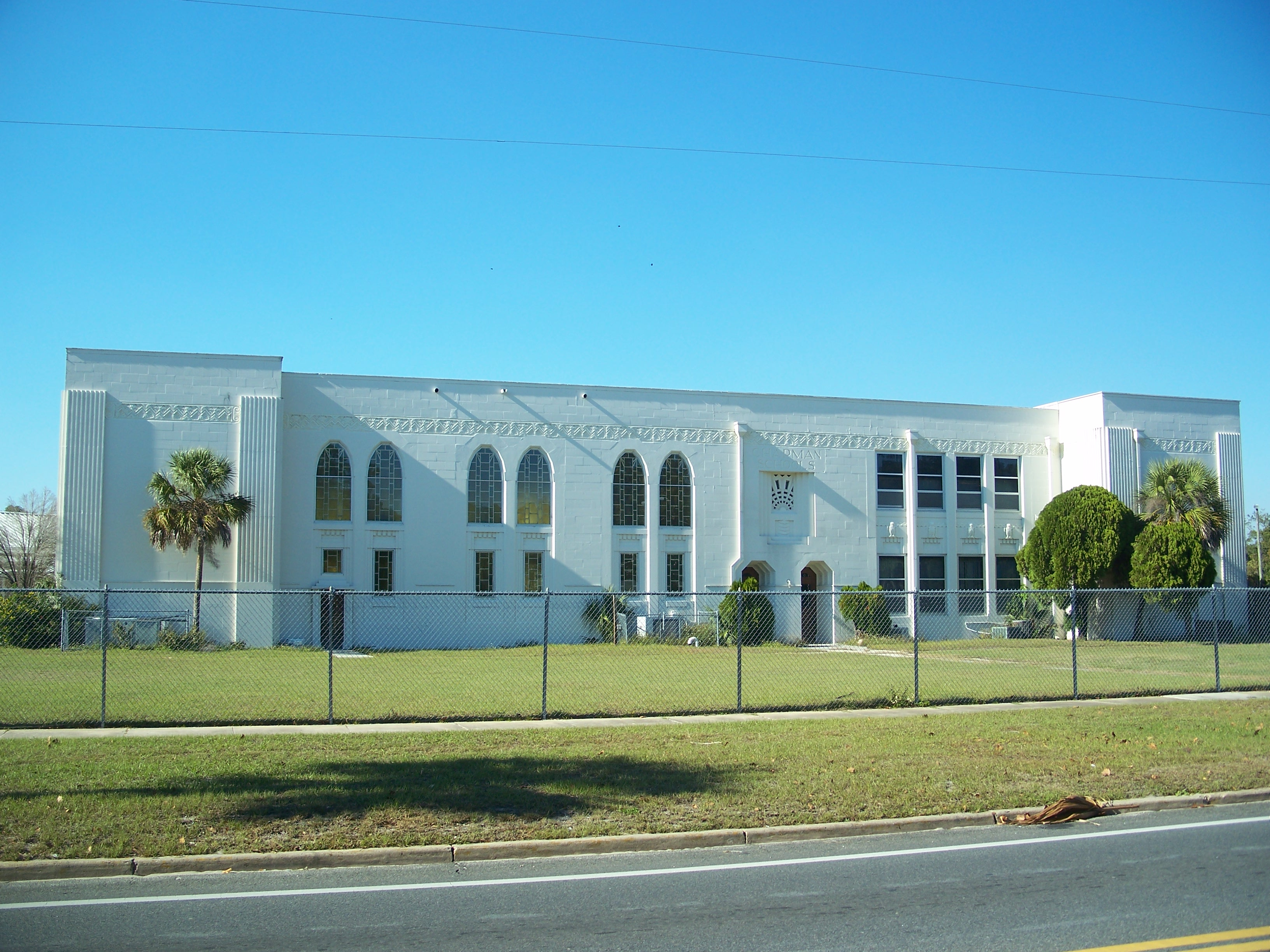
Chapman Elementary School

- He is memorialized in the genus Chapmannia and a multitude of species names.
- Chapman High School and Chapman Elementary School in Apalachicola are named in his honor.
- Chapman Botanical Gardens in Apalachicola.
- Chapman House Museum – Greek Revival-style home built in the 1840s by Chapman in Apalachicola.
