= Oak–hickory forest =

Forest ecosystem

Oak–hickory forest is a type of North American forest ecosystem, and an ecoregion of the Temperate broadleaf and mixed forests Biome.

== Geography ==
It has a range extending from Quebec and Ontario in the north, east to Rhode Island and southern New York, west to Manitoba and Iowa, and south to Northern Georgia. Smaller, isolated oak–hickory communities can also be found as far west as North Dakota, south in Florida and in northeast Texas, and north to southern Maine and Ontario. They can also be found in Pennsylvania west to Illinois.

Dominated by nut-bearing oak and hickory species of trees, the oak–hickory forest has the largest range of any deciduous forest ecosystem in eastern and central North America.

== Natural history ==
The current oak–hickory forest includes the former range of the oak–chestnut forest region, which encompassed the northeast portion of the current oak–hickory range. When the American chestnut population succumbed to invasive fungal blight in the early 20th century, those forests shifted to an oak and hickory dominated ecosystem.

=== Biota ===
Key indicator tree and shrub species of the oak–hickory forest include red oak, black oak, scarlet oak, white oak, Chestnut oak (Quercus montana), Pignut hickory (Carya glabra), Bitternut hickory (Carya cordiformis), Shagbark hickory (Carya ovata), flowering dogwood (Cornus florida), blueberry, Mountain laurel (Kalmia latifolia), hawthorn, and sprouts of American chestnut.

Bird and animal species include the gray squirrel, white-tailed deer, flying squirrel, chipmunk, blue jay, and wild turkey.

== See also ==
- Oak–heath forest
- Northeastern interior dry–mesic oak forest
- Central Appalachian dry oak–pine forest
- Allegheny-Cumberland dry oak forest and woodland
- Central and southern Appalachian montane oak forest
