= Appalachian hemlock–northern hardwood forest =

Type of forest

The Appalachian hemlock–northern hardwood forest is a forest system found in the Appalachian Mountains of New Hampshire, Vermont, Massachusetts, Connecticut, New York, New Jersey, Pennsylvania, Maryland, Virginia, Eastern Kentucky, West Virginia and western North Carolina. These forests are generally limited to deep coves, moist flats, and ravines in the southern portion, but they are more abundant in the central and northern portions, particularly from the Allegheny Mountains northward into New England, where they form significant parts of the Allegheny Highlands forests, Appalachian-Blue Ridge forests, and Northeastern coastal forests ecoregions.

== Flora ==
Appalachian hemlock–northern hardwood forests include yellow birch (Betula alleghaniensis), mountain maple (Acer spicatum), sugar maple (Acer saccharum), and beech (Fagus grandifolia). American chestnut (Castanea dentata) was historically a dominant tree in this forest type, but it was decimated by blight in the early 20th century and exists today as stump sprouts. These trees often form a deciduous canopy but are sometimes mixed with hemlock (Tsuga canadensis) or white pine (Pinus strobus). Other common trees include oaks (most commonly red oak (Quercus rubra)), tulip tree (Liriodendron tulipifera), black cherry (Prunus serotina), and sweet birch (Betula lenta).

Mountain laurel (Kalmia latifolia), hophornbeam (Ostrya virginiana), and rhododendron (Rhododendron spp.) are found in the understory.

== Fauna ==
The Appalachian Mountains are home to a vast population of white-tailed deer, which number in the millions and are found across the region. Because white-tailed deer are so prolific, extensive, and plentiful, the Appalachian Mountains have become a hotspot prized by white-tailed deer hunters. Eastern grey squirrels, eastern chipmunks, eastern cottontails, and woodchucks are other common small animals found in the Appalachian Mountains, and they are preyed upon by larger mammals such as Eastern American red foxes, eastern coyotes, American black bears, bobcats, and fishers. Many organizations are planning to reintroduce the elk back into its extirpated habitat, where they already established populations in parts of Pennsylvania.

Birds are a crucial part of the Appalachian Mountains and multiple species call the Appalachians home, such species include American robins, mallards, eastern wild turkeys, northern cardinals, Canada geese, and American goldfinches.

== Adjacent transitions ==
In the north this forest type is replaced by Laurentian–Acadian pine–hemlock–hardwood forest and Laurentian–Acadian northern hardwood forest.

== See also ==
- Allegheny-Cumberland dry oak forest and woodland
- North-Central Interior Beech-Maple Forest
- Central Appalachian dry oak-pine forest
- Central Appalachian pine-oak rocky woodland
- Northeastern interior dry-mesic oak forest
- Northern hardwood forest
- New England-Acadian forests
- South-Central Interior Mesophytic Forest
