= Oak–heath forest =

Type of plant community

An oak–heath forest is a plant community association and type of forest ecology. It is a deciduous forest type of well-drained, acidic soils, characterized by oaks (Quercus) and plants of the heath family (Ericaceae). It is commonly found in the high elevations of the eastern United States. Many of the existing oak–heath forests once featured American chestnut (Castanea dentata) as an important canopy species before being decimated by blight. The chestnut populations still exist today as sprouts, though they rarely reach maturity.

== Setting ==
Oak-heath forests are mostly found in the dry areas across Eastern North America. In the United States, this includes states like Pennsylvania, Virginia, West Virginia, and the Appalachians mountain range. Some features that make an oak-heath forest unique are the abundance of oak trees which include the chestnut, white, black, scarlet, and red northern oak. It also includes heath plants that make up the ecosystem. The plants are brought up on dry soil which leads to the ecosystem being fire-adapted allowing sustain a certain level of fire resistance. Oak-Heath forests are drought tolerant with distinct seasons including winters and summers. There is not a significant amount of rainfall observed in these ecosystems, which helps to explain the dry soil.

== Characteristics ==
The determining factor for Oak-Heath forests is the abundance of oak trees in the canopy of the forest and heath shrubs at the base near the soil. There are various species that make up the oak component of the forest including white oak, red oak, and northern red oak. The most abundant oak species found in the Virginia Oak-Heath forests is the chestnut oak that originally was present when Oak-Chestnut forests dominated the areas that Oak-Heath forests are now present.

On the other hand, the heath component of the forests are also made up of many different species. Heath plants/flowers are often shrubby, short trees or plants that grow on acidic, infertile soil. Some species that are considered heath plants include blueberries and azaleas. The presence of the heath plants contribute greatly to the ecosystem as they act as a food source for other biological organisms.

== Biosphere ==
With a large canopy and food provided by the shrubbery, oak-heath forests are home to many inhabitants. There is a large bird population that makes use of the resources that the Oak-Heath forests has to offer. Uniquely, one source that examined the West Virginia Oak-heath forests specifically claimed that certain species like the Eastern spotted skunk, bumblebees, black bear, ruffled grouse, wormeating warbler, and a moth require the type of habitat provided by the oak-heath ecosystem.

Top predators present in these forests include previously mentioned black bears. These prey mostly vegetation, fruits, and nuts. Moving down the food chain, herbivores include insects such as caterpillars and moths. The main driver of photosynthesis in the forest are the large oaks while the shrubbery made up by the heath plants contribute to other food types like berries. The observed food chain in these types of forests are reminiscent of other deciduous forests around the world.

== Conservation and threats ==
Invasive species and fire suppression have led to issues with Oak-Heath conservation. One well-studied example of the effect of invasive species on the oak-heath forests involves the white-tailed deer. Although this deer is native to North America, over-population deplete the resources of oak-health forest significantly. The deer roam and browse the forest, leading to the heath shrubs being depleted. Alongside this, the deer, being browsers, suppress oak growth by eating seeds. The spongy moth is another species that has been deemed invasive to barrens like Oak-Heath forests. The spongy moth can affect the forests by feeding on leaves leading to defoliation especially on Oak trees, their primary source of food. Efforts to conserve these oak-heath forests involve planned fire implementation, controlled burns, as the fires allow for the Oak trees to disperse their seeds and grow. This also combats the invasive species that lead to oak-heath depletion. Humans have both helped and impeded Oak-heath conservation via fire implementation and deforestation, respectively.

== Heath plants ==
Heath plants common to this ecology include mountain-laurel (Kalmia latifolia), various blueberries (genus Vaccinium), huckleberries (genus Gaylussacia), sourwood or sorrel-tree (Oxydendrum arboreum), and azaleas and rhododendrons (genus Rhododendron). These are all usually shrubs, except for Oxydendrum, which is usually a small tree. There are also heaths that are sub-shrubs, usually trailing on the ground, including wintergreens (genus Chimaphila and Gaultheria) and trailing arbutus (Epigaea repens).

== See also ==
- Oak–hickory forest
- Northeastern interior dry–mesic oak forest
- Central Appalachian dry oak–pine forest
- Allegheny–Cumberland dry oak forest and woodland
- Central and southern Appalachian montane oak forest
