= Beech–maple forest =

Closed canopy hardwood forest

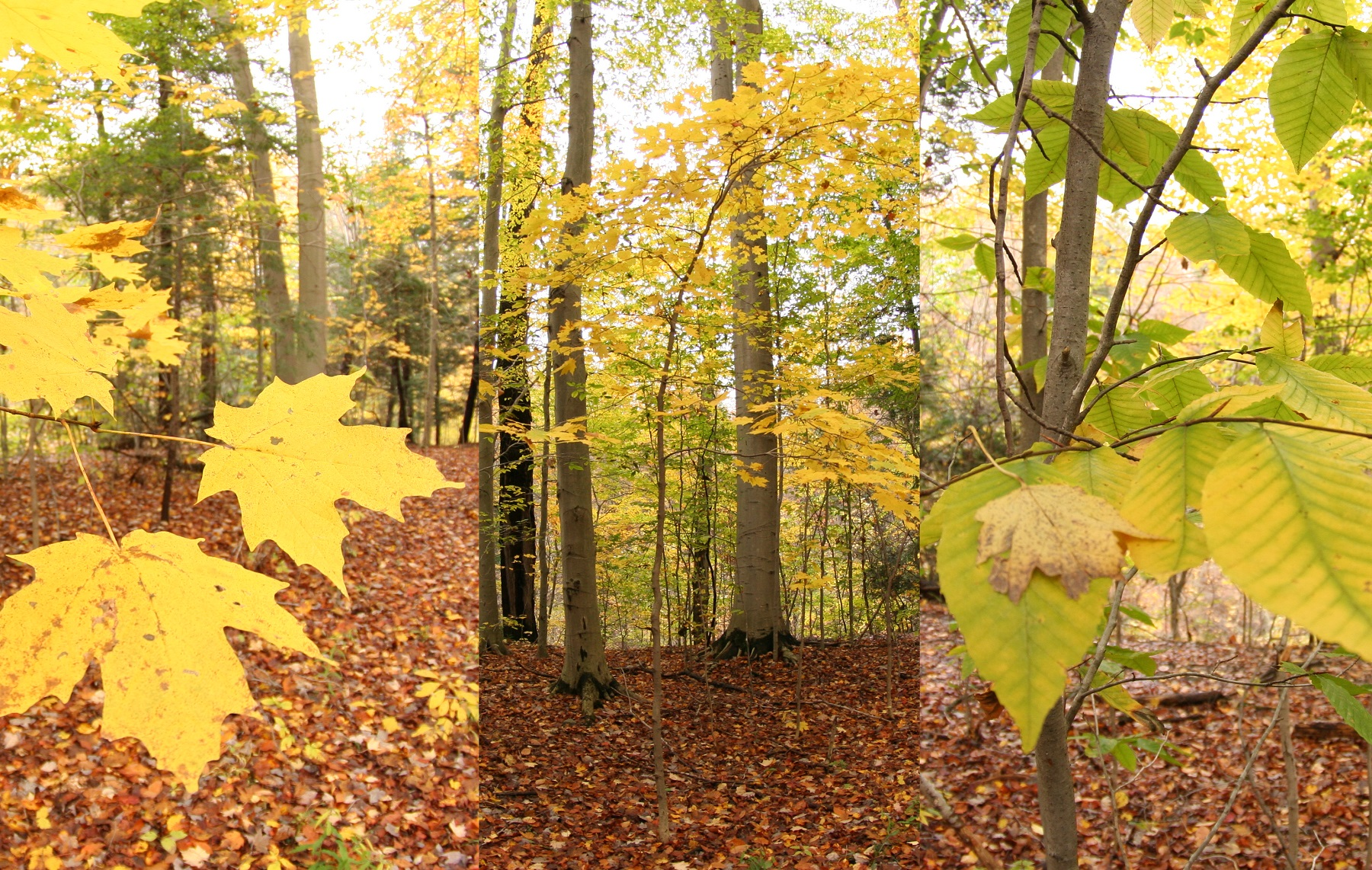
A beech–maple forest with details of leaves (Cleveland Metroparks, Ohio).

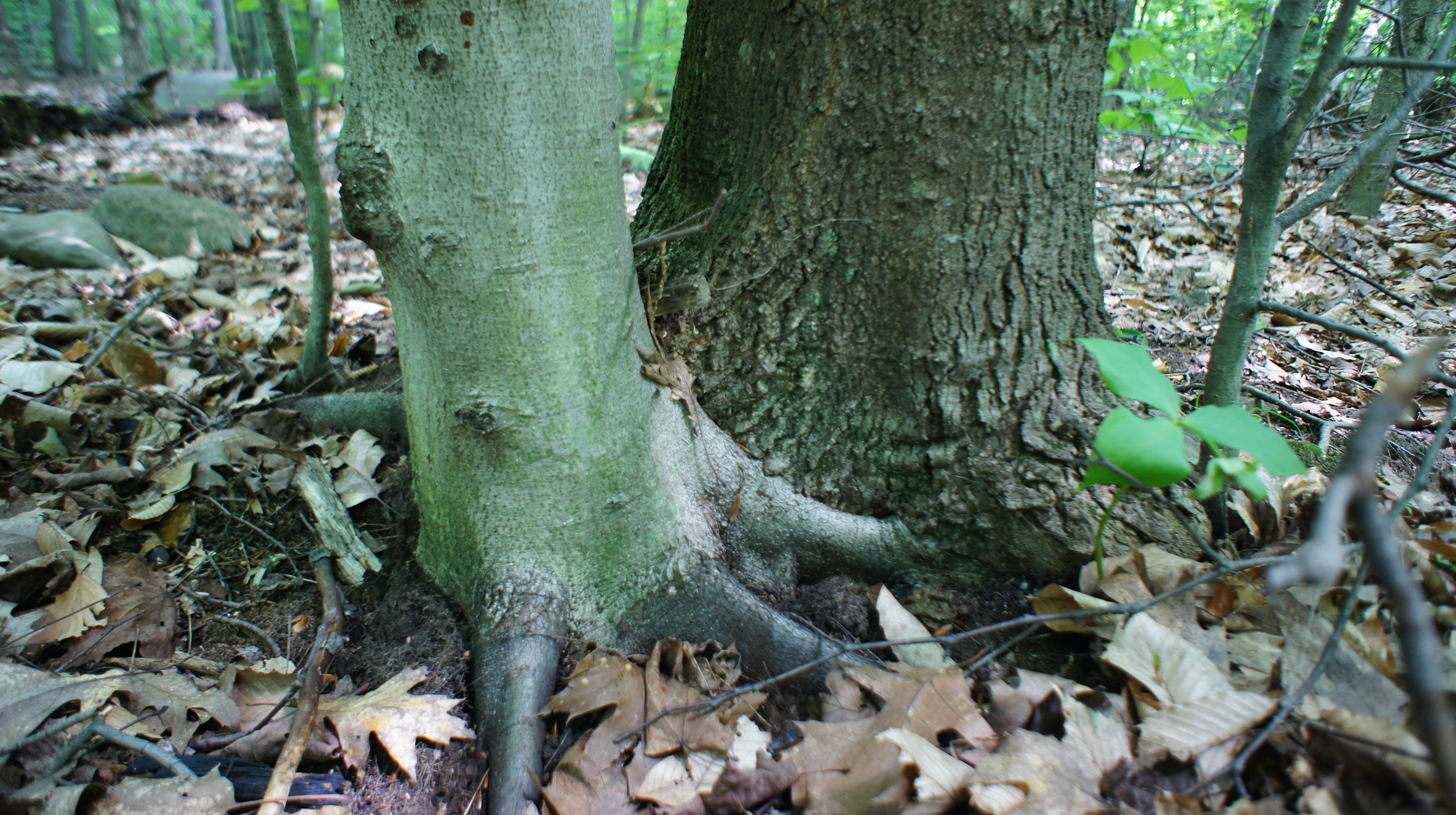
A beech and maple tree growing adjacent to each other.

A beech–maple forest or a maple beech forest is a climax mesic closed canopy hardwood forest. It is primarily composed of American beech and sugar maple trees which co-dominate the forest and which are the pinnacle of plant succession in their range. A form of this forest was the most common forest type in the Northeastern United States when it was settled by Europeans and remains widespread but scattered today.

== Description ==
The canopy is dominated by American beech and sugar maple trees, providing little light to the understory. The reduced light provides poor conditions for shrubs, with the exceptions of American witch-hazel and alderleaf viburnum shrubs. The ground cover includes herbs and spring ephemerals, flowers which are able to bloom before the canopy fills in. Seedlings of beech and maple trees are shade-tolerant, allowing them to grow in low light conditions for several years. These seedling are waiting for an opening in the canopy, and grow rapidly when an opening is made by the death of a mature tree.

Beech–maple forests are often found on flat or rolling terrain, in a variety of moist to well-drained soils with high levels of organic matter. They thrive in glacial till from the Wisconsin glaciation. Typically, in sandy soils, the maple is more common while in soils that have more clay in them, the beech is more dominant. There must be a fairly high level of precipitation.

These forests are the result of ecological succession, a long progression of different plant species over centuries. One possible sere is from bare ground, it would start with weeds, then shrubs, weedy trees (such as mulberry), then coniferous trees (such as juniper) and additional types such as ash lead to a mixed mesophytic forest. Eventually, an oak–hickory forest develops. If the conditions allow, the final climax community for several different series is the beech–maple community. Even in a climax community dominated by two types of trees, there can be many different species of trees on the edges of the forest, in windthrow gaps or in microclimates.

== Distribution ==
The range of the beech–maple forest type extends from the Atlantic coast west to Minnesota, Michigan and from southern Canada south to Virginia and Tennessee. It is most widespread in Vermont and Upstate New York and was an important component of the original vegetation of northeastern Ohio. Instances of a beech–maple forest can be found at altitudes of 320 feet (98 m) to 3,900 feet (1,200 m).

== Gallery ==
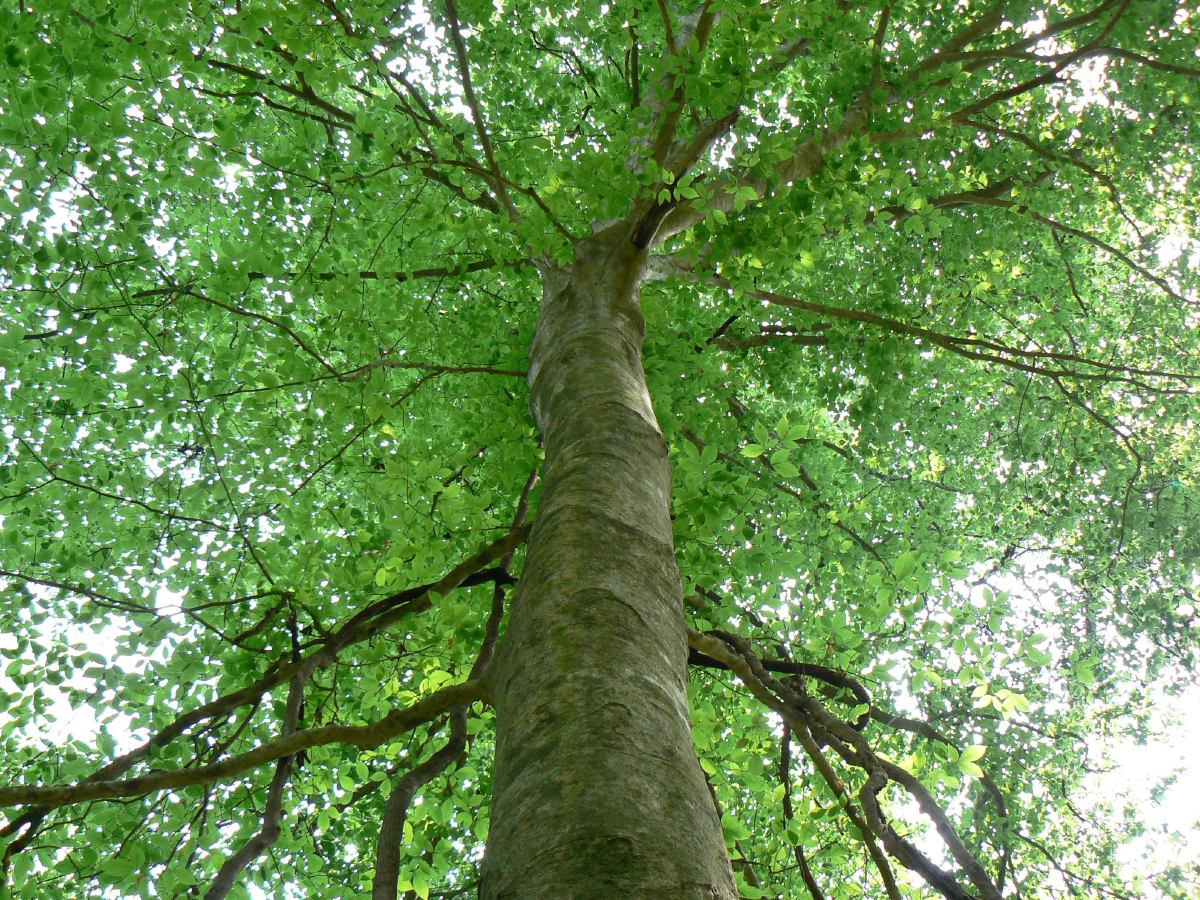
American beech, Fagus grandifolia, Gadsden Co., Florida.

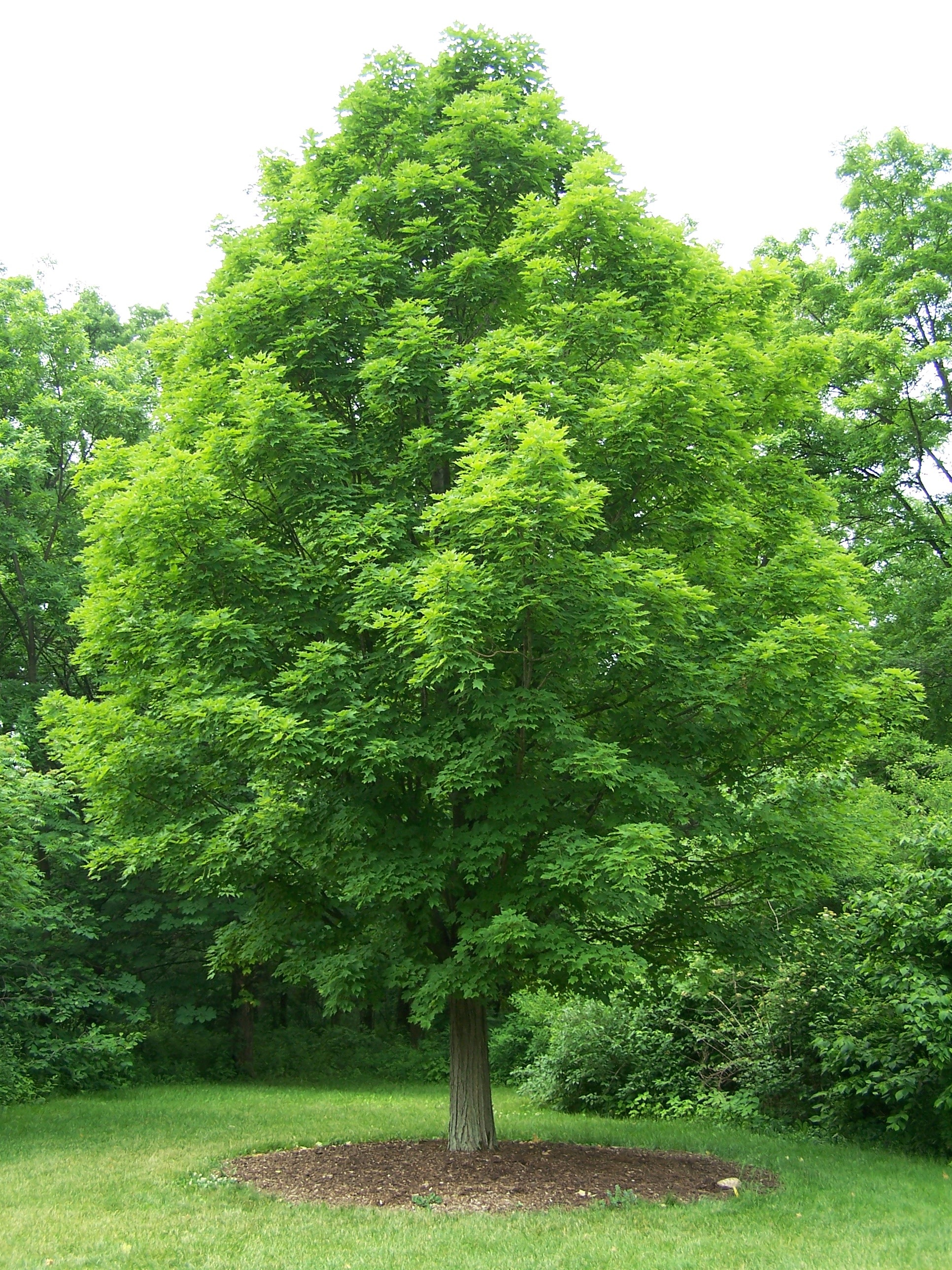
Sugar maple tree, Acer saccharum, Morton Arboretum, Lisle, Illinois.

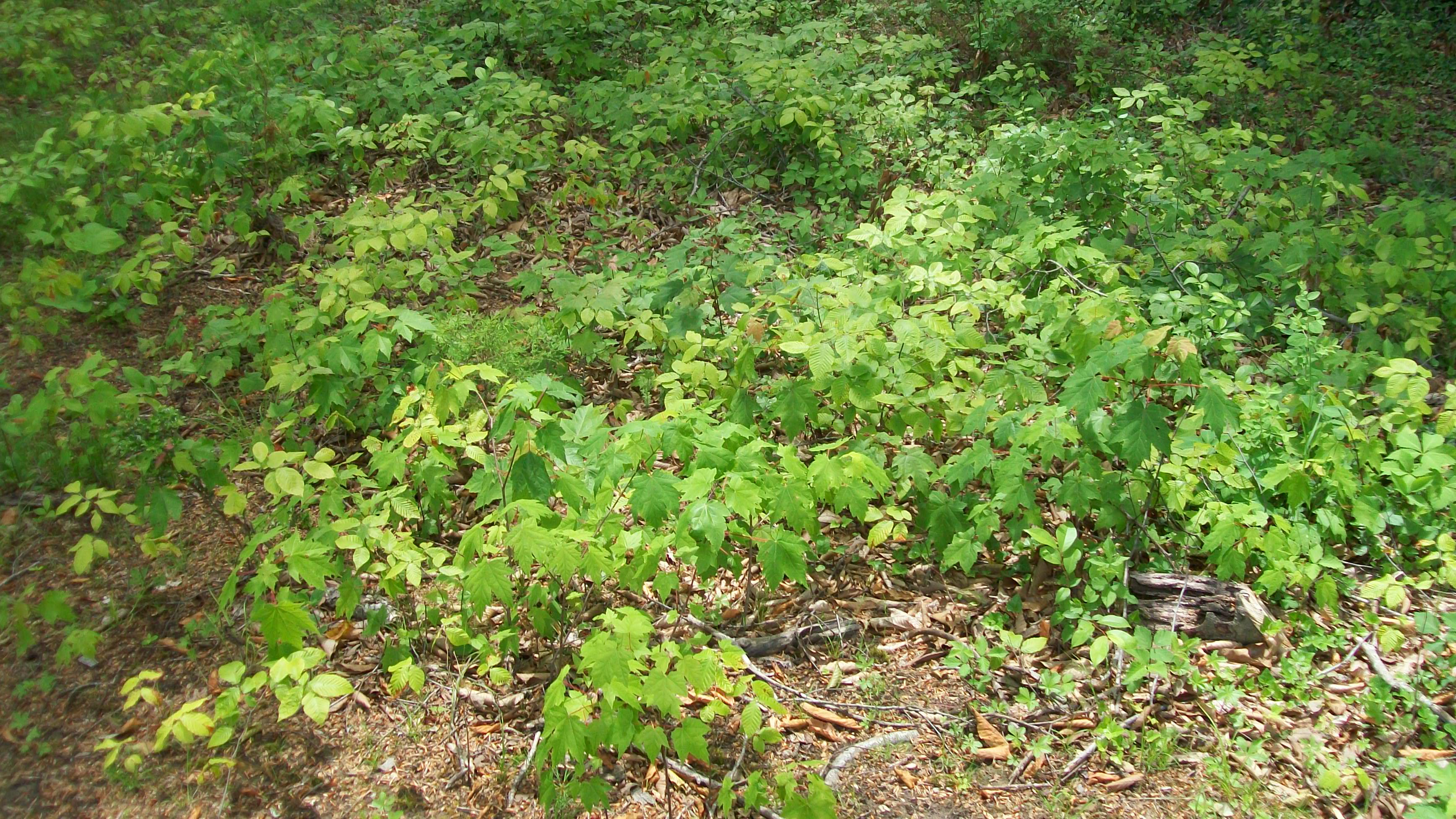
American Beech Fagus grandifolia Maple Climax community, Johnson City, TN

== See also ==
- Appalachian hemlock-northern hardwood forest
- Ecological succession
- Old-growth forest
- South-Central Interior Mesophytic Forest
