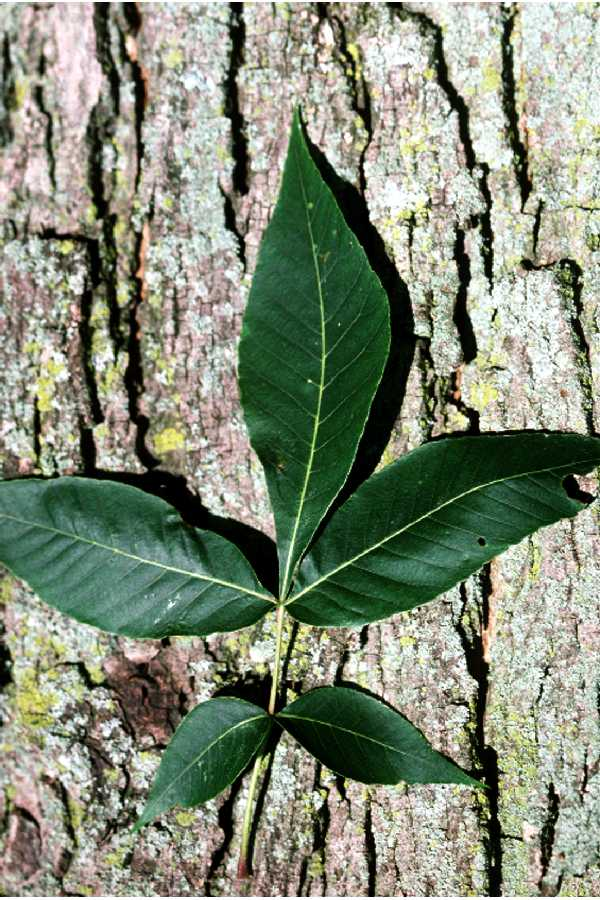

Conservation status
- Least Concern (IUCN 3.1)

Scientific classification
- Kingdom: Plantae
- Clade: Tracheophytes
- Clade: Angiosperms
- Clade: Eudicots
- Clade: Rosids
- Order: Fagales
- Family: Juglandaceae
- Genus: Carya
- Section: Carya sect. Carya
- Species: C. glabra

Binomial name
- Carya glabra Miller
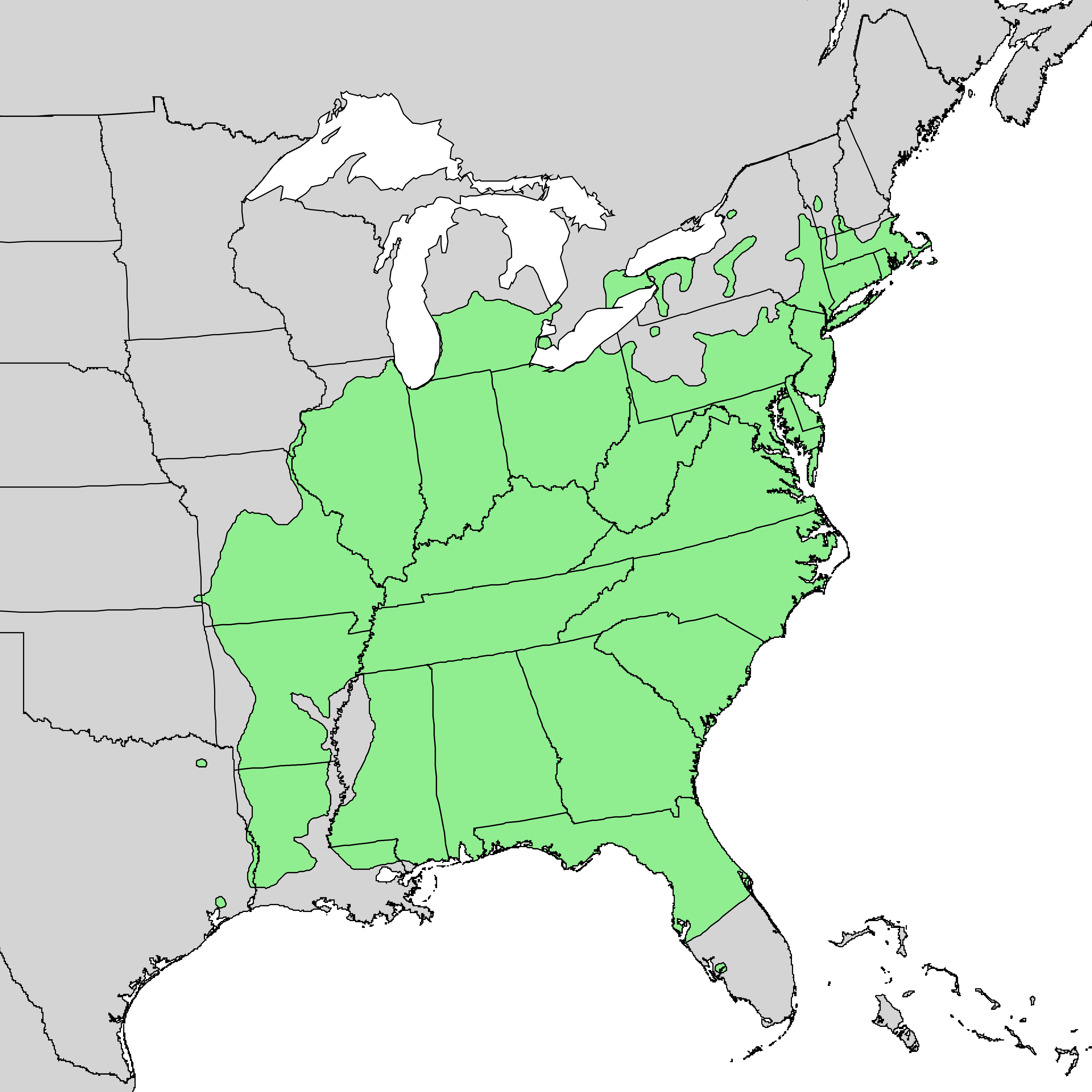
- Natural range of Carya glabra

= Carya glabra =

Pignut hickory

Species of tree

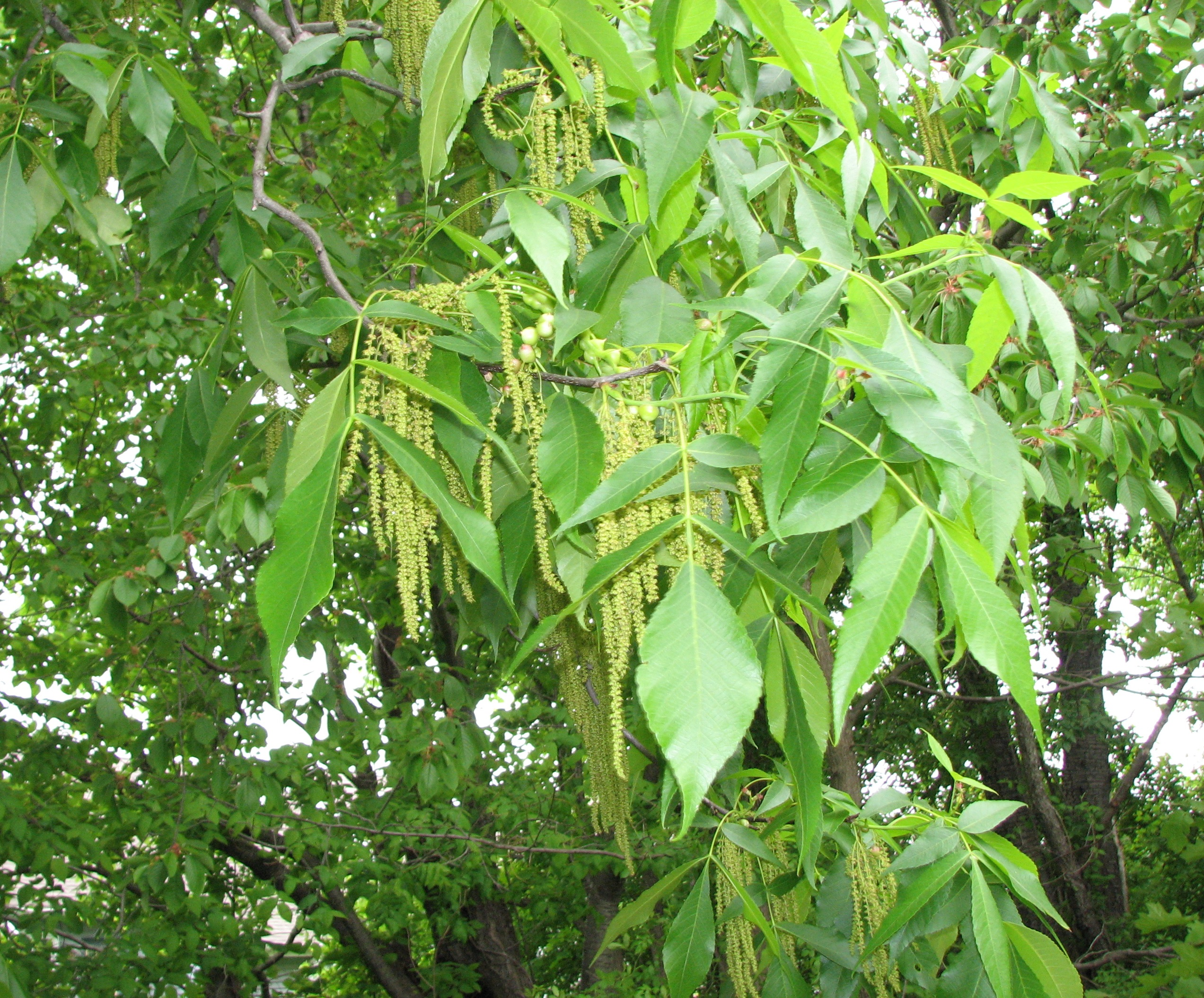
Tree with catkins and galls made by Phylloxera perniciosa

Carya glabra, the pignut hickory, is a common, but not abundant species of hickory in the oak-hickory forest association in the Eastern United States and Canada. Other common names are pignut, sweet pignut, coast pignut hickory, smoothbark hickory, swamp hickory, and broom hickory. The pear-shaped nut ripens in September and October, has a sweet maple like smell, and is an important part of the diet of many wild animals. The wood is used for a variety of products, including fuel for home heating. It has pinnately compound leaves that turn a golden yellow in the fall.

== Habitat ==
=== Native range ===
The range of pignut hickory covers nearly all of the eastern United States. The species grows in central Florida and northward through North Carolina to southern Massachusetts. It also grows north of the Gulf Coast through Alabama, Mississippi north to Missouri and extreme southeastern Iowa, and the Lower Peninsula of Michigan.

The best development of this species is in the lower Ohio River Basin. It prevails over other species of hickory in the Appalachian forests. Pignut makes up much of the hickory harvested in Kentucky, West Virginia, the Cumberland Mountains of Tennessee, and the hill country of the Ohio Valley.

Pignut hickory is also found in Canada in extreme southern Ontario. It does however have a limited range and is restricted to the Niagara Peninsula, southern Halton Region, the Hamilton area along western Lake Ontario, and southward along the northern shore of Lake Erie and pockets of extreme southwestern Ontario.

=== Climate ===
Pignut hickory grows in a humid climate with an average annual precipitation of 760 to 2,030 mm (30 to 80 in) of which 510 to 1,020 mm (20 to 40 in) is rain during the growing season. Average snowfall varies from little to none in the South to 2,540 mm (100 in) or more in the mountains of West Virginia, upstate New York, and western North Carolina (25).

Within the range of pignut hickory, average annual temperatures vary from 7 °C (45 °F) in the north to 21 °C (70 °F) in Florida. Average January temperature varies from −4 to 16 °C (25 to 61 °F) and average July temperature varies from 21 to 27 °C (70 to 81 °F). Extremes of 46 and −30 °C (115 and −22 °F) have been recorded within the range. The growing season varies by latitude and elevation from 140 to 300 days.

Mean annual relative humidity ranges from 70 to 80 percent with small monthly differences; daytime relative humidity often falls below 50% while nighttime humidity approaches 100%.

Mean annual hours of sunshine range from 2,200 to 3,000. Average January sunshine varies from 100 to 200 hours, and July sunshine from 260 to 340 hours. Mean daily solar radiation ranges from 12.57 to 18.86 million J m± (300 to 450 langleys). In January daily radiation varies from 6.28 to 12.57 million J m± (150 to 300 langleys), and in July from 20.95 to 23.04 million J m± (500 to 550 langleys).

According to one classification of climate (20), the range of pignut hickory south of the Ohio River, except for a small area in Florida, is designated as humid, mesothermal. That part of the range lying north of the Ohio River is designated humid, mesothermal. Part of the species range in peninsular Florida is classed as subhumid, mesothermal. Mountains in Pennsylvania, West Virginia, North Carolina, and Tennessee are classed as wet, microthermal, and mountains in South Carolina and Georgia are classed as wet, mesothermal. Throughout its range, precipitation is rated adequate during all seasons.

=== Soils and topography ===
Pignut hickory frequently grows on dry ridgetops and sideslopes throughout its range but it is also common on moist sites, particularly in the mountains and Piedmont. In the Great Smoky Mountains pignut hickory has been observed on dry sandy soils at low elevations. Whittaker placed pignut in a submesic class and charted it as ranging up to 1,480 m (4,860 ft)-the hickory with the greatest elevational range in the Great Smoky Mountains. In southwest Virginia, south-facing upper slopes from 975 to 1,050 m (3,199 to 3,445 ft) of Beanfield Mountain are dominated by pignut hickory, northern red oak Quercus rubra), and white oak (Q. alba). This site is the most xeric habitat on the mountain because of high insolation, 70 percent slopes, and medium- to coarse-textured soils derived from Clinch sandstone. Mid-elevation slopes from 800 to 975 m (2,625 to 3,199 ft) are dominated by chestnut oak (Q. prinus), northern red oak, and pignut hickory and coincide with three shale formations.

The range of pignut hickory encompasses 7 orders, 12 suborders, and 22 great groups of soils. About two-thirds of the species range is dominated by Ultisols, which are low in bases and have subsurface horizons of clay accumulation. They are usually moist but are dry during part of the warm season. Udults is the dominant suborder and Hapludults and Paleudults are the dominant great groups. These soils are derived from a variety of parent materials-sedimentary and metamorphic rocks, glacial till, and in places varying thickness of loess-which vary in age from Precambrian to Quaternary.

A wide range of soil fertility exists as evidenced by soil orders-Alfisols and Mollisols which are medium to high in base saturation to Ultisols which are low in base saturation. Pignut hickory responds to increases in soil nitrogen similarly to American beech (Fagus grandifolia), sugar maple (Acer saccharum), and blackgum (Nyssa sylvatica). These species are rated as intermediate in nitrogen deficiency tolerance and consequently are able to grow with lower levels of nitrogen than are required by "nitrogen- demanding" white ash (Fraxinus americana), yellow-poplar (Liriodendron tulipifera), and American basswood (Tilia americana). Hickories are considered "soil improvers" because their leaves have a relatively high calcium content.

=== Associated forest cover ===
Hickories are consistently present in the broad eastern upland climax forest association commonly called oak-hickory, but they are not generally abundant. Locally, hickories may make up to 20 to 30 percent of stand basal area, particularly in slope and cove forests below the escarpment of the Cumberland Plateau and in second-growth forests in the Cumberland Mountains, especially on benches. It has been hypothesized that hickory will replace chestnut (Castanea dentata) killed by the blight (Cryphonectria parasitica) in the Appalachian Highlands. On Beanfield Mountain in Giles County, Virginia, the former chestnut-oak complex has changed to an oak-hickory association over a period of 50 years. This association is dominated by pignut hickory with an importance value of 41.0 (maximum value = 300), northern red oak (36.0), and chestnut oak (25.0). White oak, red maple (Acer rubrum), and sugar maple are subdominant species.

Pignut hickory is an associated species in 20 of the 90 forest cover types listed by the Society of American Foresters for the eastern United States (6):

=== Northern forest region ===
53 White Pine-Chestnut Oak

=== Central forest region ===
40 Post Oak-Blackjack Oak
44 Chestnut Oak
45 Pitch Pine
46 Eastern Redcedar
52 White Oak-Black Oak-Northern Red Oak
53 White Oak
55 Northern Red Oak
57 Yellow-Poplar-Tulip tree
59 Yellow-Poplar-White Oak-Northern Red Oak
64 Sassafras-Persimmon
110 Black Oak

=== Southern forest region ===
75 Shortleaf Pine
76 Shortleaf Pine-Oak
78 Virginia Pine-Oak
79 Virginia Pine
80 Loblolly Pine-Shortleaf Pine
81 Loblolly Pine
82 Loblolly Pine-Hardwood
83 Longleaf Pine-Slash Pine

Because the range of pignut hickory is so extensive, it is not feasible to list the associated trees, shrubs, herbs, and grasses, which vary according to elevation, topographic conditions, edaphic features, and geographic locality.

== Life history ==
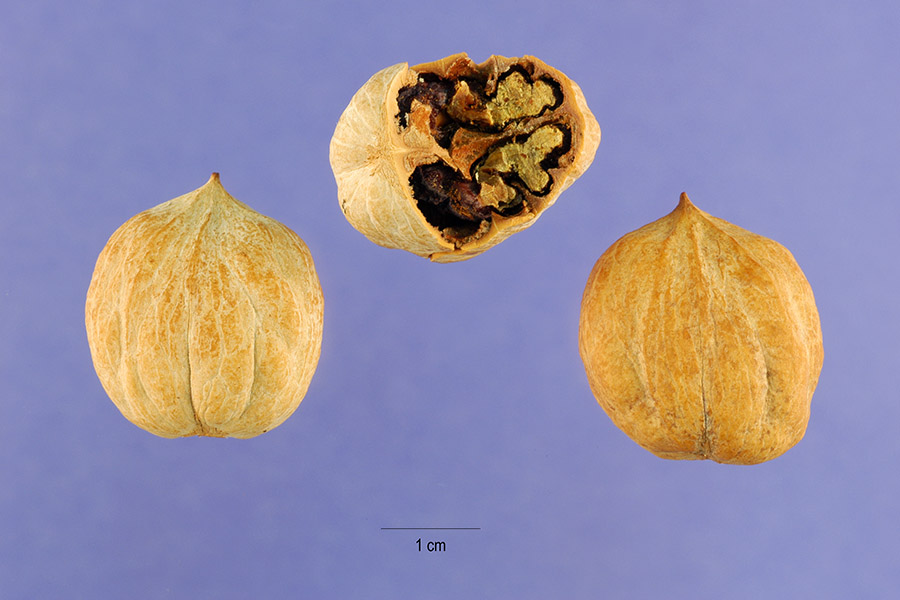
Pignut hickory nuts

=== Reproduction and early growth ===
Hickories are monoecious and flower in the spring. The staminate catkins of pignut hickory are 8 to 18 cm (3.1 to 7.1 in) long and develop from axils of leaves of the previous season or from inner scales of the terminal buds at the base of the current growth. The pistillate flowers appear in spikes about 6 mm (0.24 in) long on peduncles terminating in shoots of the current year. Flowers open from the middle of March in the southeast part (Florida) of the range to early June in Michigan. The catkins usually emerge before the pistillate flowers.

The fruit of hickory is pear shaped and enclosed in a thin husk developed from the floral involucre. The fruit ripens in September and October, and seeds are dispersed from September through December. Husks are green until maturity; they turn brown to brownish-black as they ripen. The husks become dry at maturity and split away from the nut into four valves along sutures. Husks of pignut hickory split only to the middle or slightly beyond and generally cling to the nut, which is unribbed, with a thick shell.

=== Seed production and dissemination ===
Pignut hickory begins to bear seed in quantity in 30 years, with optimum production between 75 and 200 years. The maximum age for seed production is about 300 years. Good seed crops occur every year or two with light crops in other years; frost can seriously hinder seed production. Usually less than half of the seeds are sound, but 50 to 75 percent of these will germinate. The hickory shuckworm (Laspeyresia caryana) can seriously reduce germination. Pignut seed, averaging 440/kg (200/lb), is lighter than the seed of other hickory species. The nuts are disseminated mainly by gravity, but the range of seeding is extended by squirrels and chipmunks.

=== Seedling development ===
Hickories exhibit embryo dormancy which is overcome naturally by overwintering in the duff and litter or artificially by stratification in a moist medium at 1 to 4 °C (34 to 39 °F) for 30 to 150 days. In forest tree nurseries unstratified hickory nuts are sown in the fall and stratified nuts are sown in the spring. Hickories are hypogeously germinating plants, and the nuts seldom remain viable in the forest floor for more than one winter.

Seedling growth of hickories is slow. The following height growth of pignut hickory seedlings was reported in the Ohio Valley in the open or under light shade, on red clay soil (2):

Age	Height
(yr)	(cm)	(in)
1	8	3.0
2	15	5.8
3	20	8.0
4	30	12.0
5	43	17.0

=== Vegetative reproduction ===
Hickories sprout readily from stumps and roots. Stump sprouting is not as prolific as in other deciduous trees species but the sprouts that are produced are vigorous and grow fairly rapidly in height. Root sprouts also are vigorous and probably more numerous than stump sprouts in cut-over areas. Small stumps sprout more frequently than large ones. Sprouts that originate at or below ground level and from small stumps are less likely to develop heartwood decay. Pignut hickory is difficult to reproduce from cuttings.

=== Sapling and pole stages to maturity ===
Pignut hickory often grows 24 to 27 m (79 to 89 ft) tall and occasionally reaches 37 m (121 ft), with d.b.h. of 91 to 122 cm (36 to 48 in). The bole is often forked. Height and diameter by age are shown in table 1 for selected locations. Diameter growth of pignut hickory (along with chestnut oak, white oak, sweet birch (Betula lenta), and American beech is rated slow. Since hickories constitute 15 percent or less of the basal area of oak-hickory forest types, most growth and yield information is written in terms of oak rather than oak-hickory. Yields of mixed oak stands and of hickory stands have been reported. Tree volume tables are available.

Diameter and height of pignut hickory in selected geographic areas (adapted from 2)
Age	D.b.h.	Height
	S. Indiana and N.Kentucky¹	Ohio Valley¹	Northern Ohio¹	Cumberland Mountains²	Mississippi Valley²
(yr)	(cm)	(m)	(m)	(m)	(m)
10	2	2.7	2.1	1.8	1.8
20	5	5.8	6.1	4.3	5.8
30	8	9.8	10.7	7.3	8.2
40	11	12.8	14.6	9.8	10.4
50	14	15.5	18.6	12.2	12.2
60	17	17.7	21.0	14.6	14.0
70	21	19.5	22.6	16.8	15.8
80	25	21.0	--	18.9	17.7
(yr)	(in)	(ft)	(ft)	(ft)	(ft)
10	1.0	9	7	6	6
20	2.0	19	20	14	19
30	3.2	32	35	24	27
40	4.4	42	48	32	34
50	5.5	51	61	40	40
60	6.8	58	69	48	46
70	8.4	64	74	55	52
80	10.0	69	--	62	58

¹Second growth. ²Virgin forest.

=== Rooting habit ===
Pignut hickory tends to develop a pronounced taproot with few laterals and is rated as windfirm. The taproot develops early, which may explain the slow growth of seedling shoots. Taproots may develop in compact and stony soils.

=== Reaction to competition ===
The hickories as a group are classed as intermediate in shade tolerance; however, pignut hickory has been classed as intolerant in the Northeast and tolerant in the Southeast. In much of the area covered by mixed oak forests, shade-tolerant hardwoods (including the hickories) are climax, and the trend of succession toward this climax is very strong. Although most silvicultural systems when applied to oak types will maintain a hardwood forest, the cutting methods used affects the rapidity with which other species may replace the oaks and hickories.

== Damaging agents ==
Pignut hickory is easily damaged by fire, which causes stem degrade or loss of volume, or both. However, pignut hickory can still be found in areas subject to regular burning, and stem density can increase with the application of frequent prescribed fire. Internal discolorations called mineral streak are common and are one major reason why so few standing hickories meet trade specifications. Streaks result from yellow-bellied sapsucker pecking, pin knots, worm holes, and mechanical injuries. Hickories strongly resist ice damage and seldom develop epicormic branches.

The Index of Plant Diseases in the United States lists 133 fungi and 10 other causes of diseases on Carya species. Most of the fungi are saprophytes, but a few are damaging to foliage, produce cankers, or cause trunk or root rots.

The most common disease of pignut hickory from Pennsylvania southward is a trunk rot caused by Poria spiculosa. Cankers vary in size and appearance depending on their age. A common form develops around a branch wound and resembles a swollen, nearly healed wound. On large trees these may become prominent burl-like bodies having several vertical or irregular folds in the callus covering. A single trunk canker near the base is a sign that the butt log is badly infected, and multiple cankers are evidence that the entire tree may be a cull.

Major leaf diseases are anthracnose (Gnomonia caryae) and mildew (Microstroma juglandis). The former causes brown spots with definite margins on the undersides of the leaf. These may coalesce and cause widespread blotching. Mildew invades the leaves and twigs and may form witches' brooms by stimulating bud formation. Although locally prevalent, mildew offers no problem in the management of hickory.

The stem canker (Nectria galligena) produces depressed areas with concentric bark rings that develop on the trunk and branches. Affected trees are sometimes eliminated through breakage or competition and sometimes live to reach merchantable size with cull section at the canker. No special control measures are required, but cankered trees should be harvested in stand improvement operations.

A gall-forming fungus species of Phomopsis can produce warty excrescences ranging from small twig galls to very large trunk burls on northern hickories and oaks. Little information is available on root diseases of hickory.

More than 100 insects have been reported to infest hickory trees and wood products, but only a few cause death or severe damage. The hickory bark beetle (Scolytus quadrispinosus) is the most important insect enemy of hickory, and also one of the most important insect pests of hardwoods in the Eastern United States. During drought periods in the Southeast, outbreaks often develop and large tracts of timber are killed. At other times, damage may be confined to the killing of a single tree or to portions of the tops of trees. The foliage of heavily infested trees turns red within a few weeks after attack, and the trees soon die. There is one generation per year in northern areas and normally two broods per year in the South. Control consists of felling infested trees and destroying the bark during winter months or storing infested logs in ponds.

Logs and dying trees of several hardwood species including pignut hickory are attacked by the ambrosia beetle (Platypus quadridentatus) throughout the South and north to West Virginia and North Carolina. The false powderpost beetle (Xylobiops basilaris) attacks recently felled or dying trees, logs, or limbs with bark in the Eastern and Southern States. Hickory, persimmon (Diospyros virginiana), and pecan (C. illinoinensis) are most frequently infested, but other hardwoods also are attacked. Healthy trees growing in proximity to heavily infested trees are occasionally attacked but almost always without success.

Hickory is one of several host species of the twig girdler (Oncideres cingulata). Infested trees and seedlings are not only damaged severely but become ragged and unattractive. A few of the more common species of gall-producing insects attacking hickory are Phylloxera caryaecaulis, Caryomyia holotricha, C. sanguinolenta, and C. tubicola.

== Special uses ==
Aside from consuming its edible nuts, Native Americans would use pignut hickory for other culinary resources. The nuts can be boiled to make an oil, which can be used as spread on food or as hair oil, with the meat remaining to be eaten or preserved.

Hickories provide food to many kinds of wildlife. The nuts are relished by several species of squirrel and represent an estimated 10 to 25 percent of their diet. Hogs were observed consuming the nuts in colonial America, lending the species its common name. Nuts and flowers are eaten by the wild turkey and several species of songbirds. Nuts and bark are eaten by black bears, foxes, rabbits, and raccoons. Small mammals eat the nuts and leaves; 5 to 10 percent of the diet of eastern chipmunks is hickory nuts. White-tailed deer occasionally browse hickory leaves, twigs, and nuts.

The kernel of hickory seeds is exceptionally high in crude fat, up to 70 to 80 percent in some species. Crude protein, phosphorus, and calcium contents are generally moderate to low. Crude fiber is very low.

Pignut hickory makes up a small percentage of the biomass in low-quality upland hardwood stands that are prime candidates for clearcutting for chips or fuelwood as the first step toward rehabilitation to more productive stands. Hickory has a relatively high heating value and is used extensively as a home heating fuel.

Pignut hickory is an important shade tree in wooded suburban areas over most of the range but is seldom planted as an ornamental tree because of its size and difficulty of transplanting, although it has spectacular orangey-red fall colors.

== Genetics ==
Carya glabra var. megacarpa (Sarg.) Sarg., coast pignut hickory, was once recognized as a distinct variety but is now considered to be a synonym of C. glabra (Mill.) Sweet. C. leiodermis Sarg., swamp hickory, has also been added as a synonym of C. glabra.

Carya glabra (Mill.) Sweet var. glabra distinguishes the (typical) pignut hickory from red hickory (C. glabra var. odorata (Marsh.) Little). The taxonomic position of red hickory is controversial. The binomial C. ovalis (Wangenh.) Sarg. was published in 1913 for a segregate of C. glabra. It was reduced to a synonym of C. glabra in Little's 1953 checklist but was elevated to a variety in the 1979 edition. The principal difference is in the husk of the fruit, opening late and only partly, or remaining closed in C. glabra but promptly splitting to the base in C. ovalis. However, many trees are intermediate in this trait, and the recorded ranges are almost the same. The leaves of C. ovalis have mostly seven leaflets; those of C. glabra have mostly five leaflets. The two can be distinguished with certainty only in November. Since the two ranges seem to overlap, the distributions have been mapped together as a Carya glabra-ovalis complex.

Carya ovalis has also been treated as an interspecific hybrid between C. glabra and C. ovata. C. ovalis was accepted as a polymorphic species especially variable in size and shape of its nuts and is possibly a hybrid. The relationships may be more complex after a long and reticulate phylogeny, according to detailed chemical analyses of hickory nut oils.

Carya glabra is a 64 chromosome species that readily hybridizes with other hickories, especially C. ovalis.

One hybrid, C. x demareei Palmer (C. glabra x cordiformis) was described in 1937 from northeastern Arkansas.

== Gallery ==
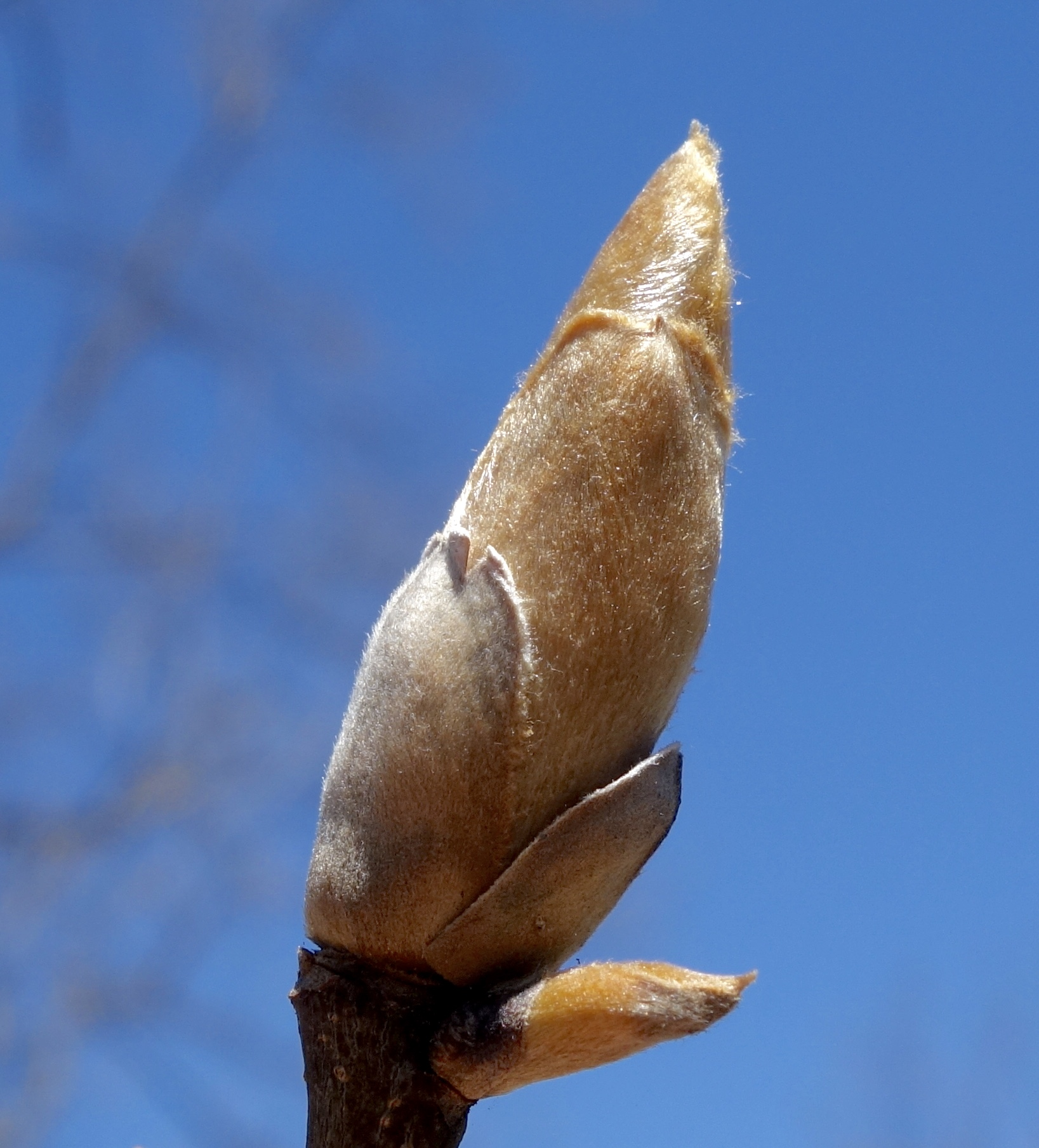
Bud

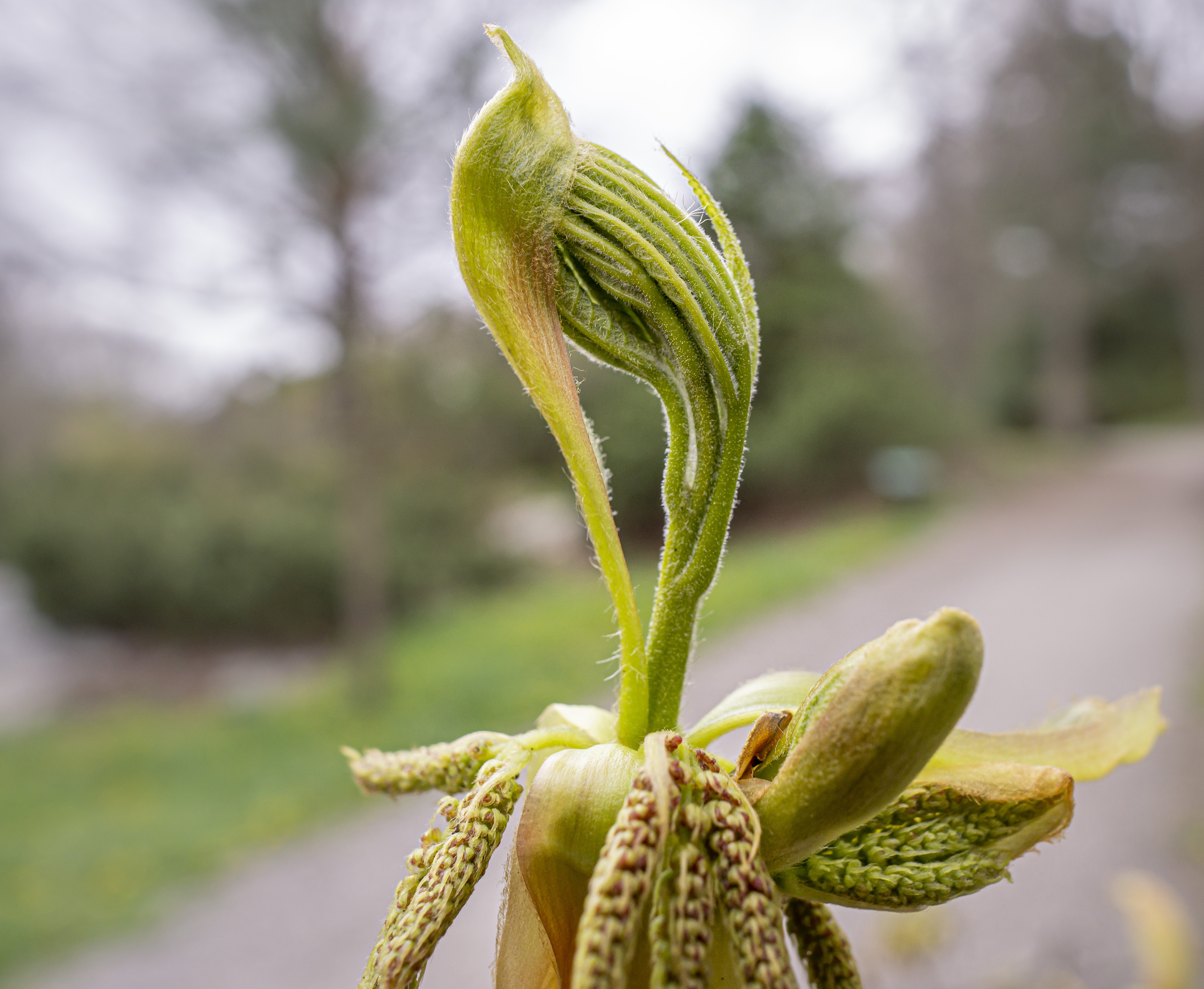
Bud break

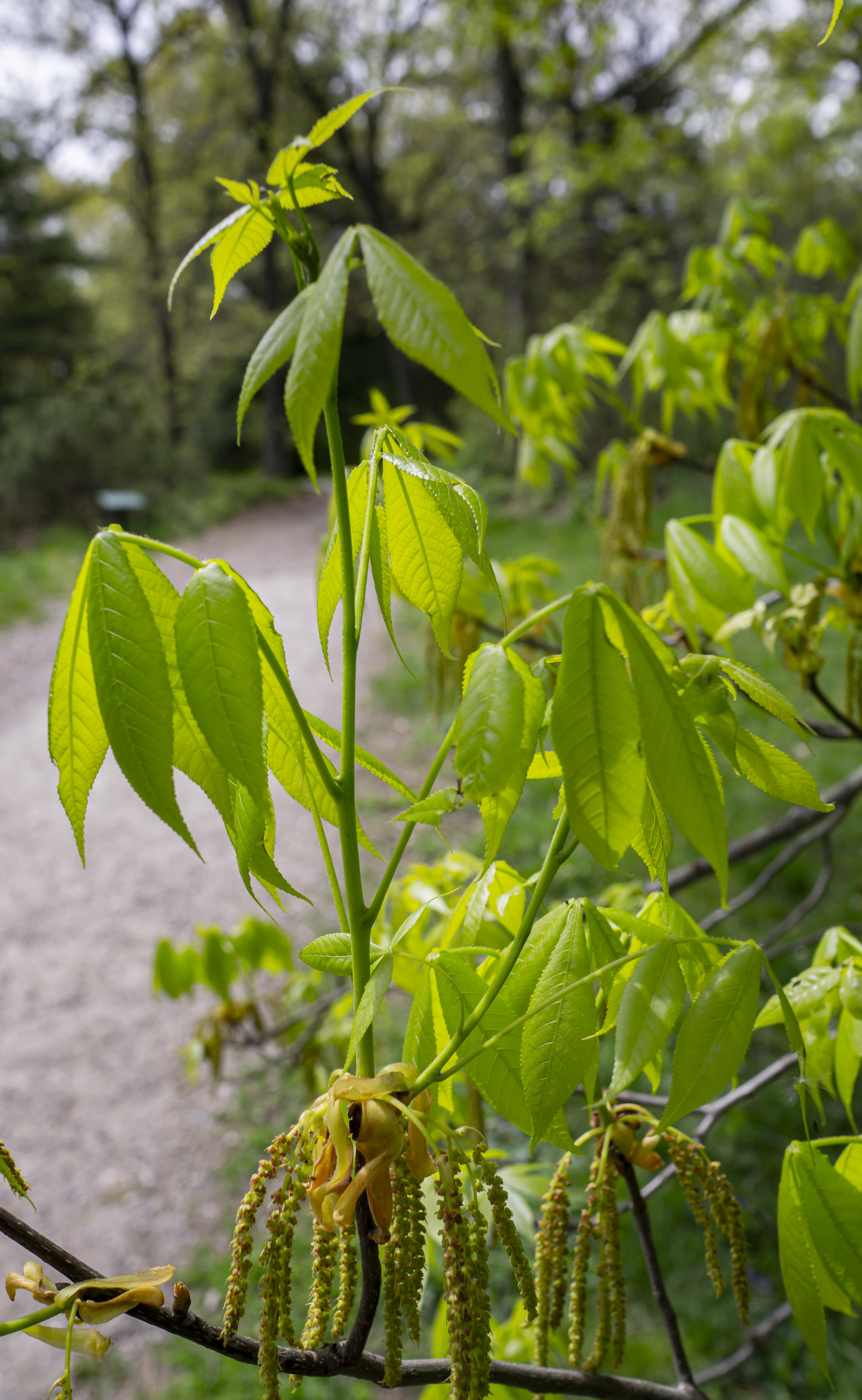
Leaves

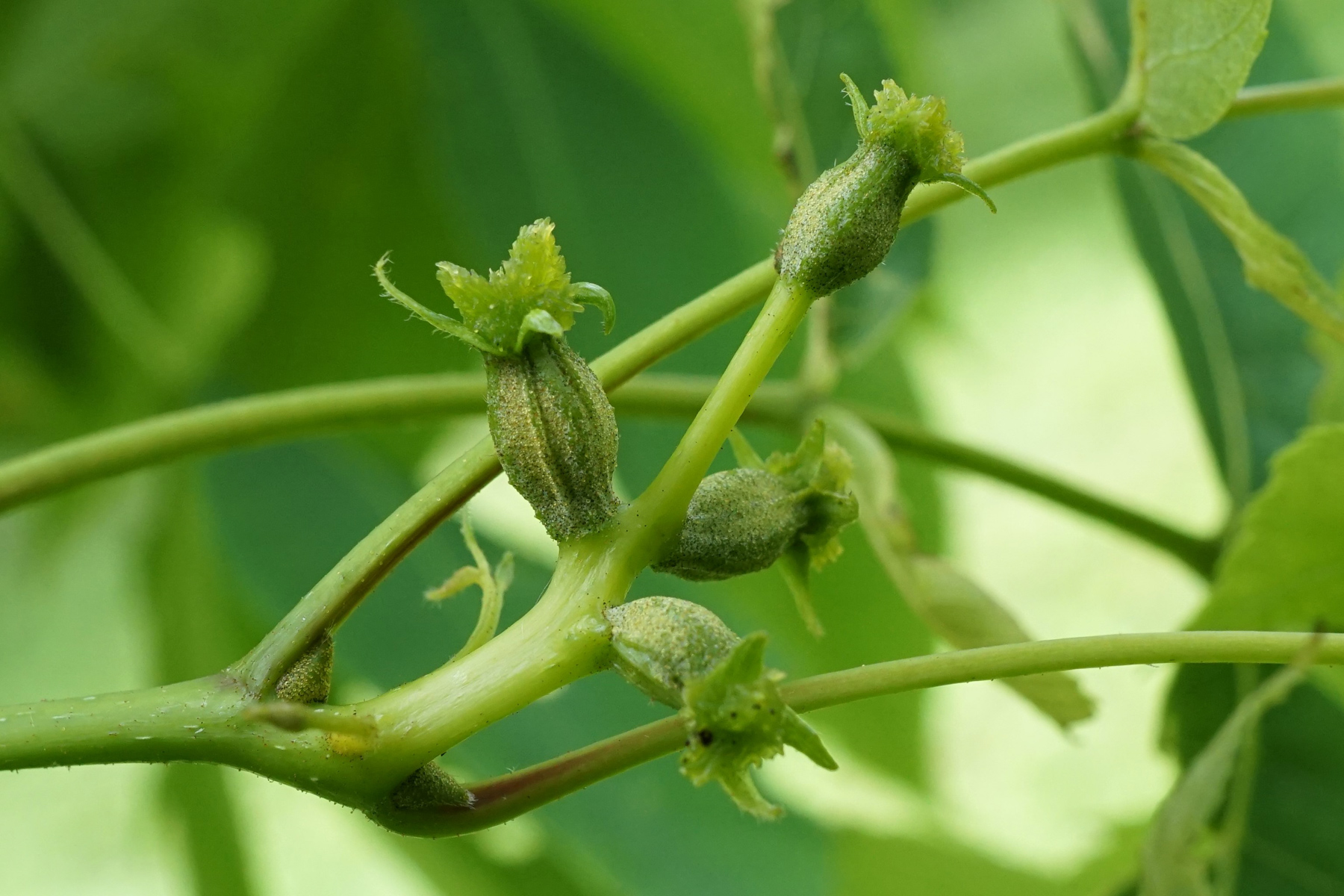
Female flowers

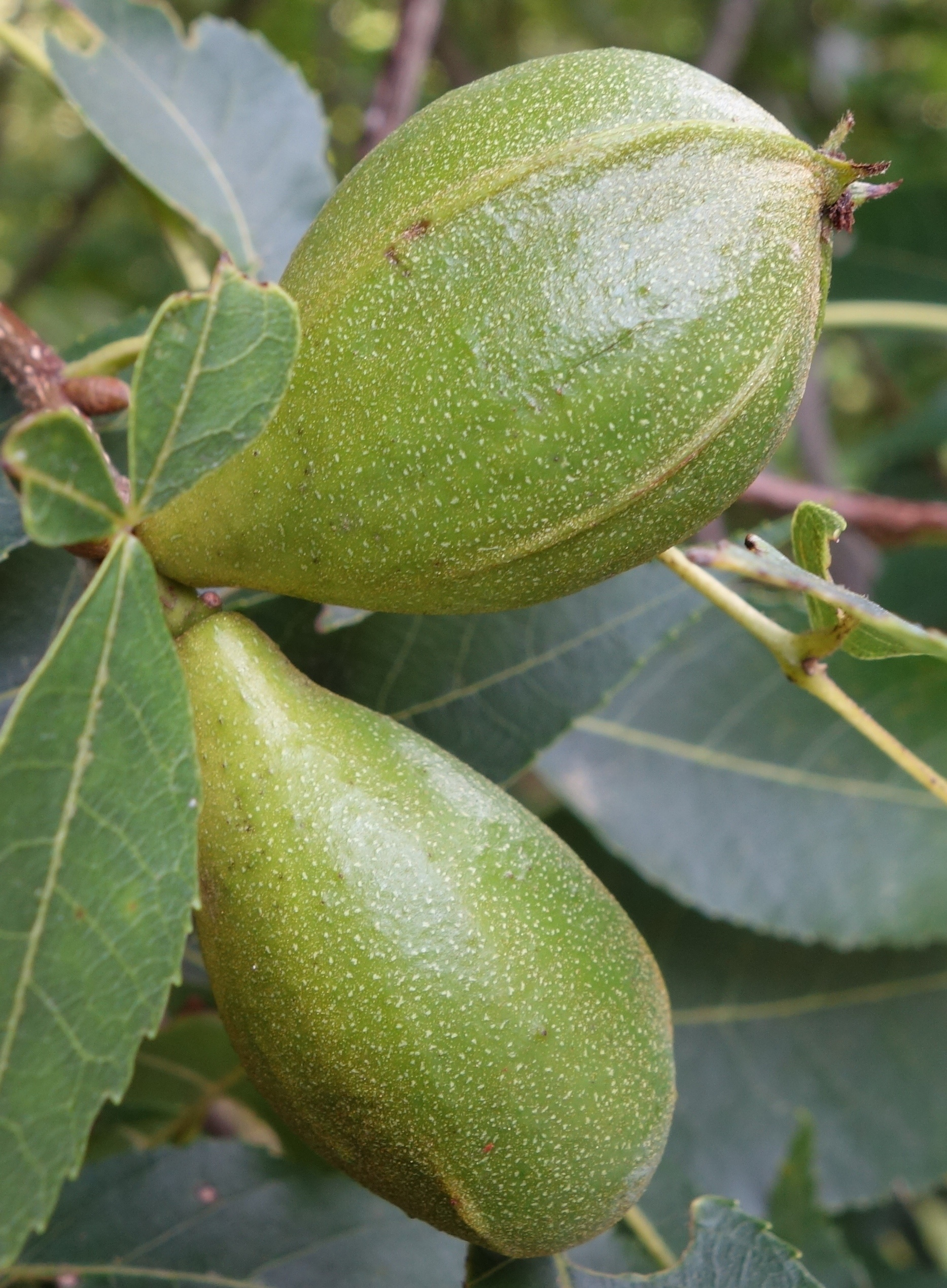
Maturing fruit

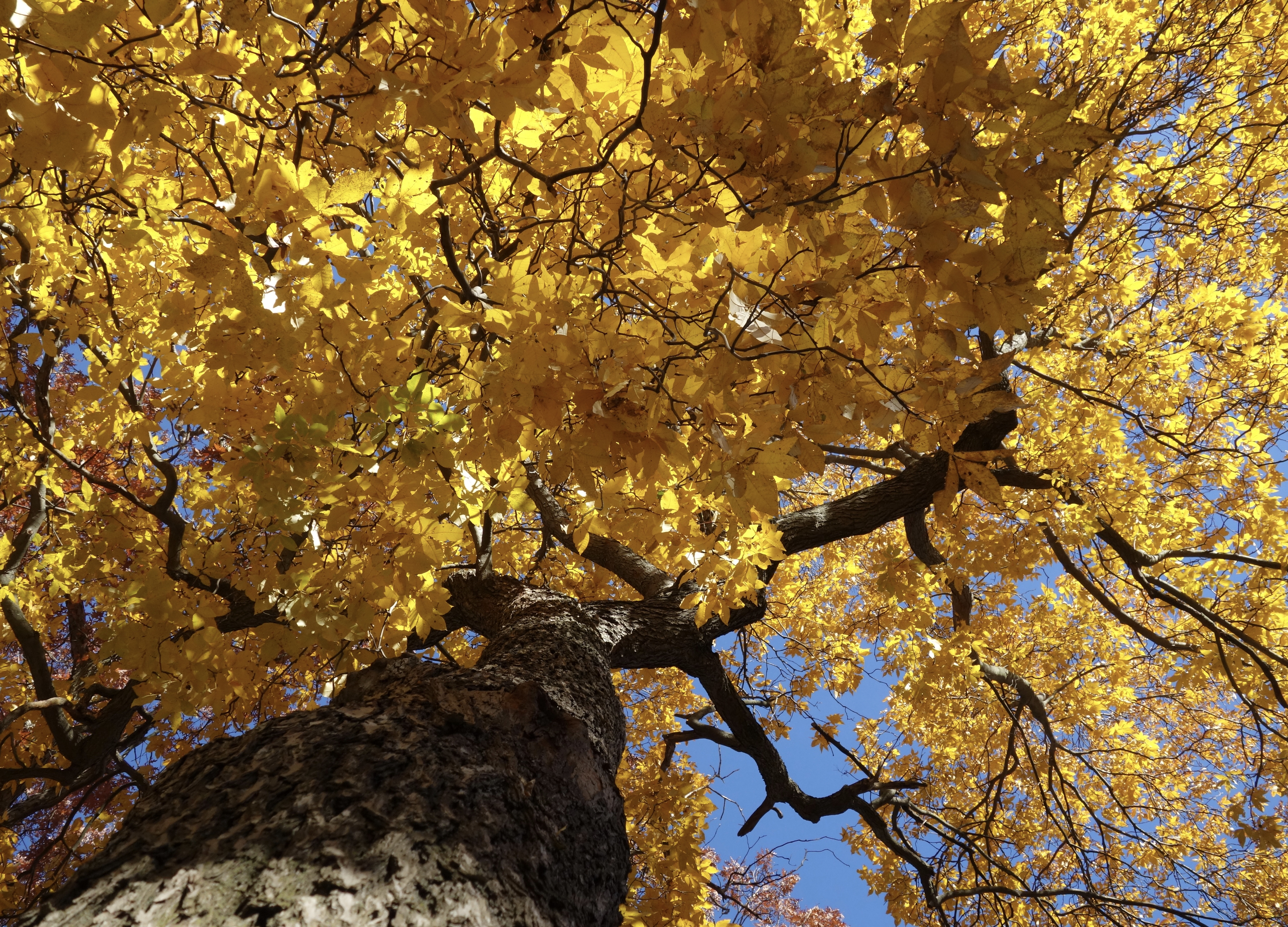
Carya glabra in fall
