= Allegheny–Cumberland dry oak forest and woodland =

Type of forest

The Allegheny–Cumberland dry oak forest and woodland is a forest system found in extreme southwestern Pennsylvania near the Mason-Dixon line, far southeastern Ohio, West Virginia, and western Virginia. It also occurs in scattered patches in Kentucky, Tennessee, Alabama, and Georgia.

These forests occur on varied topographies, including on acidic substrates in the Allegheny and Cumberland plateaus and ridges in the southern Ridge-and-Valley Appalachians. The Northeastern Interior Dry-Mesic Oak Forest occurs below this habitat in the northern part of its range.

== Flora ==
The Allegheny–Cumberland dry oak forest and woodlands are typically dominated by white oak (Quercus alba), southern red oak (Quercus falcata), northern red oak (Quercus rubra), chestnut oak (Quercus montana), and scarlet oak (Quercus coccinea). Less frequent are red maple (Acer rubrum), pignut hickory (Carya glabra), and mockernut hickory (Carya tomentosa).

Shortleaf pines (Pinus echinata) or Virginia pines (Pinus virginiana) are occasionally present, particularly near escarpments or in recently burned areas. In areas that have not recently burned, white pines (Pinus strobus) may be prominent. Sprouts of American chestnut (Castanea dentata) can still be found in areas where it was formerly common.

== Adjacent transitions ==
On more base-rich substrates, this system transitions to Southern Ridge and Valley/Cumberland dry calcareous forest. To the east and north, it borders the Central Appalachian dry oak–pine forest, generally along the Allegheny Front.
