= South-Central Interior Mesophytic Forest =

Type of forest

The South-Central Interior Mesophytic Forest is a forest system found along the Allegheny and Cumberland plateaus in unglaciated southwestern Pennsylvania, much of West Virginia, western Virginia, southeastern Ohio, and extends into Kentucky, Tennessee, Georgia, and Alabama, with disjunct occurrences in glaciated northwestern Pennsylvania and southwestern New York where it is now classified as the North-Central Interior Beech-Maple Forest as a result of the Wisconsin glaciation.

== Overview ==
Corresponds to Lucy Braun's "Mixed Mesophytic Forest", the mesophytic forest is known for its exceptionally high tree diversity and complex structure. It represents one of the most species-rich temperate broadleaf forest communities in the world, characterized by a balanced mixture ("meso-") of moisture-loving ("-phytic") species rather than dominance of one genus. This forest type typically occurs in humid and sheltered coves, hollows, lower slopes, areas near small streams, and river valleys. The Northeastern Interior Dry-Mesic Oak Forest, Allegheny-Cumberland Dry Oak Forest and Woodland, and Southern Appalachian Oak Forest typically occurs on the higher and drier slopes above this habitat.

== Flora ==
The herb layer is very rich and often has abundant spring ephemerals. In undisturbed areas, the canopy trees can grow very large. Typical trees include sugar maple (Acer saccharum), beech (Fagus grandifolia), tuliptree (Liriodendron tulipifera), basswood (Tilia americana), northern red oak (Quercus rubra), American sycamore (Platanus occidentalis), cucumber-tree (Magnolia accuminata), bitternut hickory (Carya cordiformis), pawpaw (Asimina triloba) and black walnut (Juglans nigra). White oak (Quercus alba) and sprouts of American chestnut (Castanea dentata) are common on slightly drier benches. Other trees typically include eastern hemlock (Tsuga canadensis), white ash (Fraxinus americana), sweetgum (Liquidambar styraciflua), black tupelo (Nyssa sylvatica), sweet birch (Betula lenta), river birch (Betula nigra), and yellow buckeye (Aesculus flava).

== Fauna ==
The rich diversity and microclimatic stability of this forest support an equally diverse faunal community, ranging from songbirds in the canopy to amphibians on moist soils. Mammals typically include white-tailed deer, gray squirrel, fox squirrel, eastern chipmunk, wild turkey, southern flying squirrel, raccoon, Virginia opossum, gray fox, eastern cottontail, groundhog, and bobcat. Birds typically include wood thrush, robin, blue jay, scarlet tanager, red-eyed vireo, ovenbird, Acadian flycatcher, pileated woodpecker, red-bellied woodpecker, northern flicker, black-throated blue warbler, cerulean warbler, Kentucky warbler, and worm-eating warbler. Barred owls and eastern screech owls are typically found in mesic ravines and riparian areas. Reptiles include the garter snake and the gray ratsnake. The moist and rich leaf litter, coarse woody debris, and abundant ephemerals support salamanders, frogs, pollinators, and diverse invertebrate life.

== See also ==
- Appalachian hemlock-northern hardwood forest
- Mesophyte
