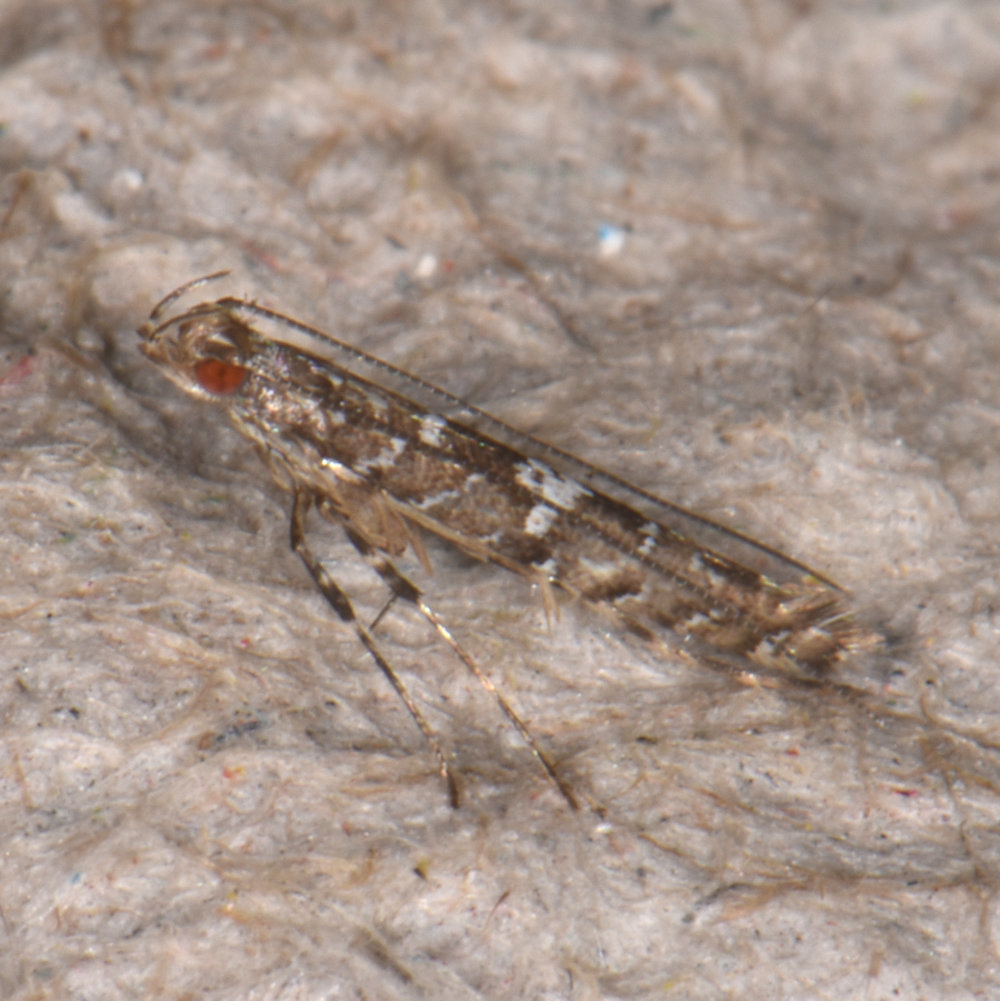

Scientific classification
- Kingdom: Animalia
- Phylum: Arthropoda
- Clade: Pancrustacea
- Class: Insecta
- Order: Lepidoptera
- Family: Gracillariidae
- Genus: Acrocercops
- Species: A. strigosa

Binomial name
- Acrocercops strigosa Braun, 1914

= Acrocercops strigosa =

Species of moth

Acrocercops strigosa is a moth of the family Gracillariidae. It is known from Quebec and the United States (Kentucky, North Carolina, Maine and Vermont).

The larvae feed on Quercus alba and Quercus prinus. They mine the leaves of their host plant.
