= Mesophyte =

Terrestrial plants adapted to neither very dry nor very wet environments

Mesophytes are terrestrial plants which are adapted to neither particularly dry nor particularly wet environments. An example of a mesophytic habitat would be a rural temperate meadow, which might contain goldenrod, clover, oxeye daisy, and Rosa multiflora. Mesophytes prefer soil and air of moderate humidity and avoid soil with standing water or containing a great abundance of salts. They make up the largest ecological group of terrestrial plants, and usually grow under moderate to hot and humid climatic regions.

== Morphological adaptations ==
Mesophytes do not have any specific morphological adaptations. They usually have broad, flat and green leaves; An extensive fibrous root system to absorb water; and the ability to develop perennating organs such as corms, rhizomes and bulbs to store food and water for use during drought.

== Anatomical adaptations ==
Mesophytes do not have any special internal structure. Epidermis is single layered usually with obvious stomata. Opening or closing of stomata is related to water availability. In sufficient supply of water stomata remain open while in limited supply of water stomata are closed to prevent excessive transpiration leading to wilting.

== Properties ==
Mesophytes generally require a more or less continuous water supply. They usually have larger, thinner leaves compared to xerophytes, sometimes with a greater number of stomata on the undersides of leaves. Because of their lack of particular xeromorphic adaptations, when they are exposed to extreme conditions they lose water rapidly, and are not tolerant of drought. Mesophytes are intermediate in water use and needs. These plants are found in average conditions of temperature and moisture and grow in soil that has no water logging. The roots of mesophytes are well developed, branched and provided with a root cap. The shoot system is well organised. The stem is generally aerial, branched, straight, thick and hard. Leaves are thin, broad in middle, dark green and of variable shape and measurement.

For example, in hot weather they may overheat and suffer from temperature stress. They have no specific adaptations to overcome this, but, if there is enough water in the soil to allow this, they can increase their rate of transpiration by opening their stomata, thus meaning some heat is removed by the evaporating water. However these plants can only tolerate saturated soil for a certain amount of time without a warm temperature. In dry weather they may suffer from water stress (losing more water via transpiration than can be gained from the soil). Again they have no specific adaptations to overcome this, and can only respond by closing their stomata to prevent further transpiration. This does actually have some benefits as it reduces the surface area of the leaves exposed to the atmosphere, which reduces transpiration. Prolonged periods of dehydration, however, can lead to permanent wilting, cell plasmolysis, and subsequent death. Since mesophytes prefer moist, well drained soils, most crops are mesophytes. Some examples are corn (maize), cucurbits, privet, lilac, goldenrod, clover, and oxeye daisy.

== See also ==
- Raunkiær plant life-form
- Appalachian mixed mesophytic forests
- South-Central Interior Mesophytic Forest
