= Northeastern interior dry–mesic oak forest =

Type of forest

The northeastern interior dry–mesic oak forest is a forest system found in Maine, Vermont, New Hampshire, Massachusetts, Connecticut, Rhode Island, New York, New Jersey, Ohio, Pennsylvania, Maryland, Virginia, and West Virginia. These forests cover large areas at low and middle elevations, typically on flat to gently rolling terrain.

== Tree types ==
Common oaks are red oak (Quercus rubra), white oak (Quercus alba), chestnut oak (Quercus montana) and black oak (Quercus velutina). Other trees include hickories (Carya spp.), red maple (Acer rubrum), sugar maple (Acer saccharum), white ash (Fraxinus americana), tulip tree (Liriodendron tulipifera), black locust (Robinia psuedoacacia), basswood (Tilia americana), American beech (Fagus grandifolia), black cherry (Prunus serotina), black birch (Betula lenta), black tupelo (Nyssa sylvatica), and American elm (Ulmus americana). Flowering dogwood (Cornus florida) is a common understory tree. Sprouts of American chestnut (Castanea dentata) are also common.

== Shrubs ==
Common shrubs are maple-leaved viburnum (Viburnum acerifolium), spicebush (Lindera benzoin), and witch hazel (Hamamelis virginiana). In sandier or more acidic soils are mountain laurel (Kalmia latifolia), blueberry (Vaccinium pallidum), huckleberry (Gaylussacia baccata), and swamp azalea (Rhododendron viscosum).

Mayapple (Podophyllum peltatum) is a common herbaceous plant.

== See also ==
- Allegheny–Cumberland dry oak forest and woodland
- Appalachian–Blue Ridge forests
- Appalachian hemlock-northern hardwood forest
- South-Central Interior Mesophytic Forest
- Central Appalachian dry oak–pine forest
