= Southern Ridge and Valley/Cumberland dry calcareous forest =

The Southern Ridge and Valley / Cumberland dry calcareous forest is a forest system found in Alabama, Georgia, Tennessee, Kentucky, Virginia, and West Virginia.

These forests occur on dry to dry–mesic calcareous habitats of the southern Ridge-and-Valley Appalachians and on low escarpments of the Cumberland Plateau. They often grow on deep soils and can be found on many landscapes within their range.

== Flora ==
Trees are mainly oaks and hickories, with other species less abundant. Oaks include white oak (Quercus alba), northern red oak (Quercus rubra), post oak (Quercus stellata), chinkapin oak (Quercus muehlenbergii), and Shumard oak (Quercus shumardii). Hickories include shagbark hickory (Carya ovata). Other trees can be sugar maple (Acer saccharum), eastern red-cedar (Juniperus virginiana), or pines.
