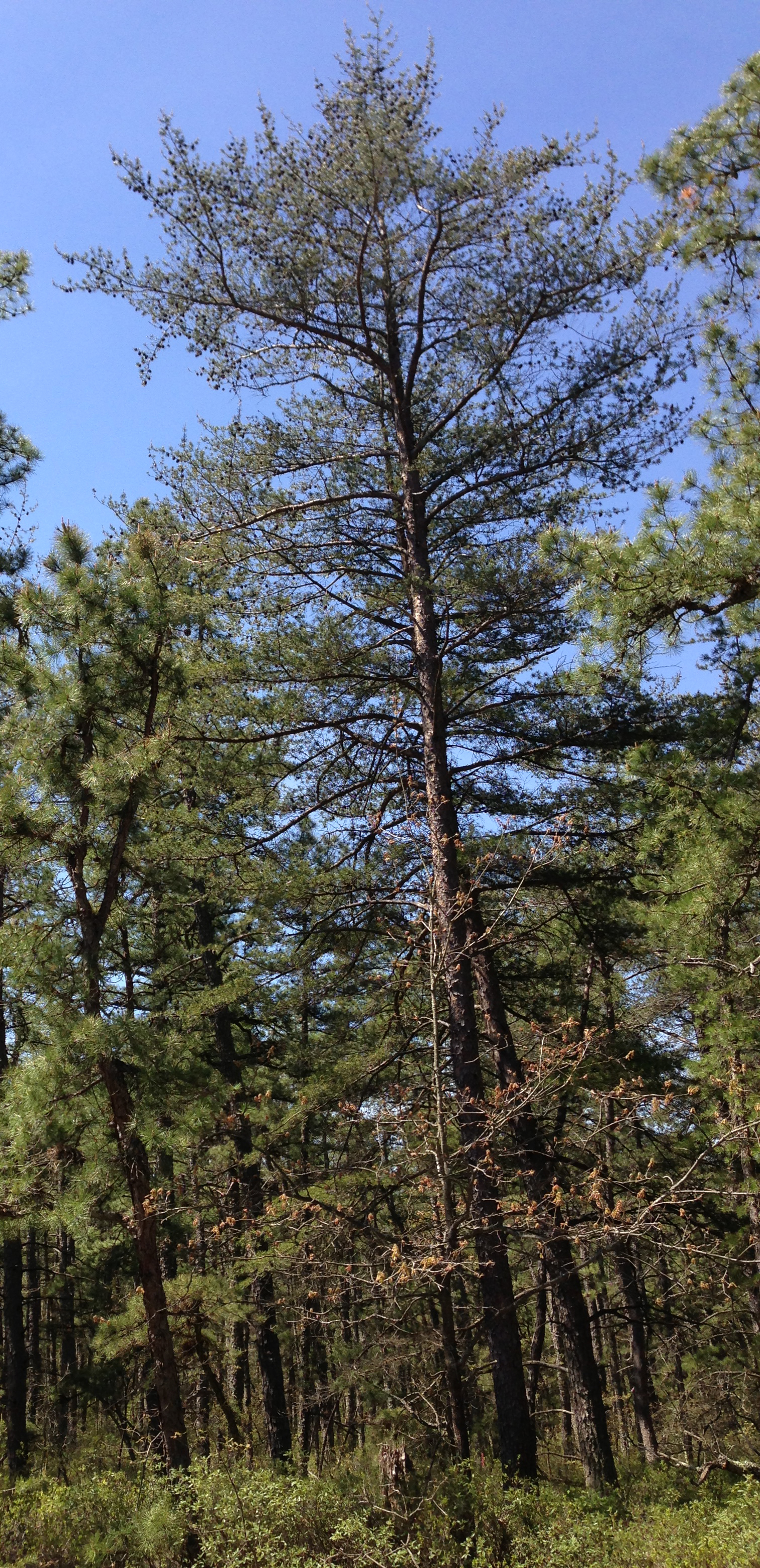

Conservation status
- Least Concern (IUCN 3.1)

Scientific classification
- Kingdom: Plantae
- Clade: Tracheophytes
- Clade: Gymnosperms
- Division: Pinophyta
- Class: Pinopsida
- Order: Pinales
- Family: Pinaceae
- Genus: Pinus
- Subgenus: P. subg. Pinus
- Section: P. sect. Trifoliae
- Subsection: P. subsect. Contortae
- Species: P. virginiana

Binomial name
- Pinus virginiana Mill.
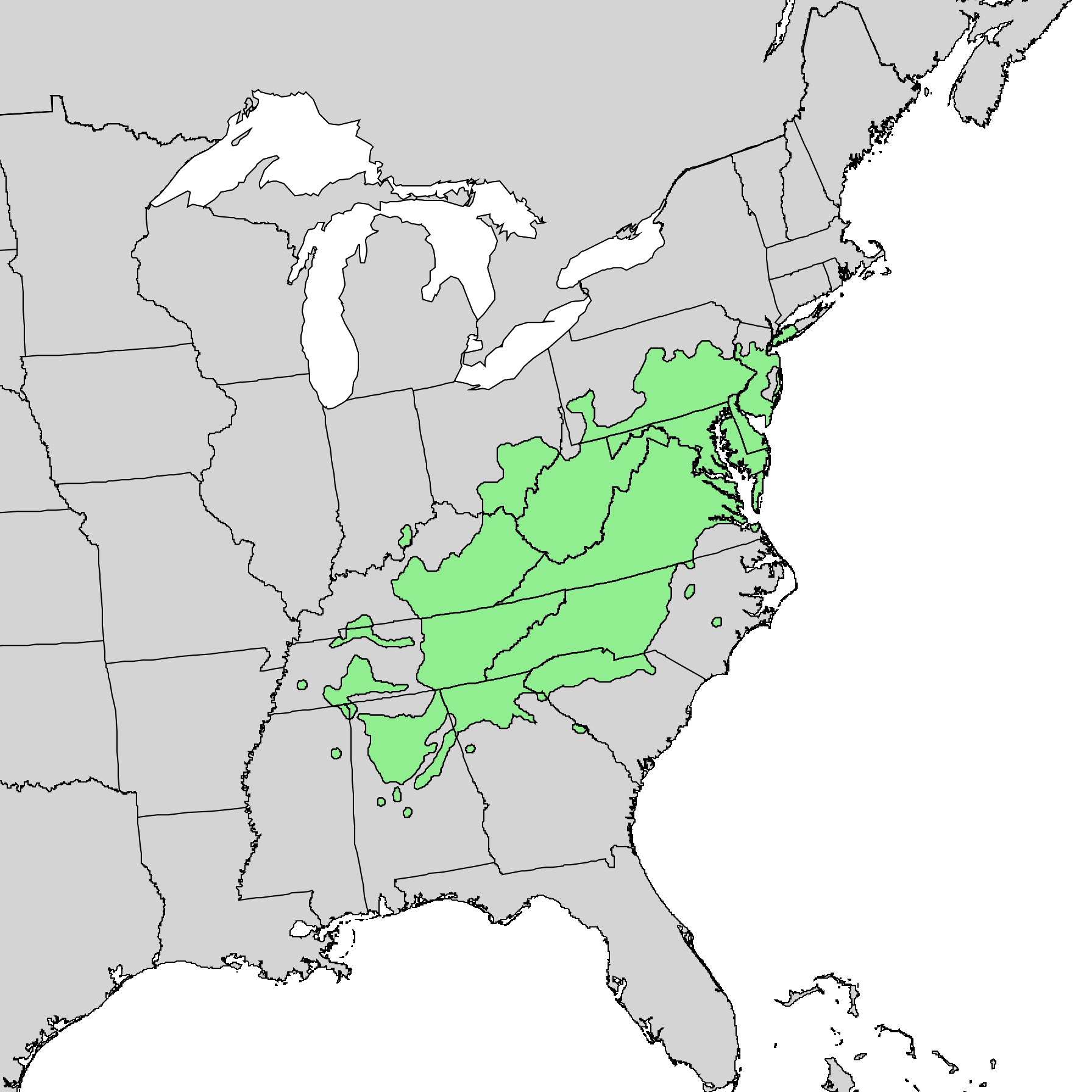
- Natural range

= Pinus virginiana =

Species of conifer

Pinus virginiana, the Virginia pine, scrub pine, Jersey pine, or possum pine, is a medium-sized conifer in the family Pinaceae, a pine often found on poorer soils from Long Island in southern New York south through the Appalachian Mountains to western Tennessee and Alabama. The usual size range for this pine is 5.5 to 18 metres. However, it can grow larger under optimum conditions. The trunk can be as large as 20 inches in diameter. This tree prefers a well-drained loam or clay, but will also grow on substandard, sandy soil, where it remains small and stunted. The typical life span is 65 to 90 years.

The short (4–8 cm), yellow-green needles are paired in fascicles and are often twisted. Pinecones are 4–7 cm long and may persist on the tree for many years, often (though not always) releasing their seeds in the second year. In growth habit, some trees may be inclined with twisted trunks.

This pine is useful for reforesting and provides nourishment for wildlife. Its other main use is on Christmas tree farms, despite having sharp-tipped needles and yellowish winter color. It can also provide wood pulp and lumber. Like some other southern yellow pines, Virginia pine lumber case hardens. That is, it becomes very hard over time during wood drying. Wood from Virginia pine is not normally considered to resist rot unless treated with preservatives.

== Description ==
Pinus virginiana is endemic to the United States and can be identified by a key characteristic: the relatively short needles are twisted and come in bunches of two. The needles are typically two to eight centimeters in length. There is hair on the bracts and the bud scales of the P. virginiana. The leaf sheath of the P. virginiana is greater than 2.5 millimeters long. The cones of the P. virginiana only open after they are mature. The branches of the Pinus virginiana are flexible. They will bend when pressure is added to them. Pinus virginiana is between 9 and 18 meters tall. The bark of P. virginiana is red and brown, and also tends to be rough with relatively small bark scales. The pollen cones are circular, almost elliptical and are 10–20 millimeters in size. They are the same color as the bark, typically. Seed cones are spread throughout the tree. The mature seed cones (4–7 cm) are much larger than the pollen cones. The P. virginiana prefers to grow in poor soils and dry loam or clay. They can grow on sandy soil, but this usually causes the tree to be smaller than the average P. virginiana.

== Taxonomy ==
Pinus virginiana is in the family Pinaceae and the order Pinales. A molecular phylogeny indicates that the sister taxa to Pinus virginiana are Pinus clausa, Pinus contorta, and Pinus banksiana. Pinus banksiana has shorter needles than P. virginiana at 2–3.5 centimeters in length, whereas P. virginiana is 2–8 centimeters in length. P. banksiana needles are not twisted, but curved, and have cones that are serotinous and unarmed. The leaf sheaths in P. banksiana are less than 2.5 millimeters long. In P. virginiana the needles are twisted and straight. The cones open at maturity, are not serotinous and the scales on the cones have prominent prickles. The sheaths of the P. virginiana are greater than 2.5 millimeters long. Pinus clausa has larger needles than the P. virginiana. The Pinus clausa has needles that are between 5 and 13 centimeters long, P. virginiana has needles that range between 2 and 8 centimeters long. Pinus clausa is also serotinous. Lastly, Pinus virginiana and Pinus contorta are distributed differently: Pinus virginiana are found on the eastern side of the United States, whereas Pinus contorta is found on the western side. A similarity between Pinus virginiana and Pinus contorta is that the needles of both species are twisted.

== Distribution and habitat ==
Pinus virginiana inhabits dry forested areas. The tree occurs in New York, New Jersey, Pennsylvania, Virginia, West Virginia, Ohio, Illinois, Kentucky, Tennessee, North Carolina, Georgia, Alabama, Mississippi, Indiana, South Carolina, Maryland and Delaware. In locations where the P. virginiana lives, rainfall is typically between 890 and 1400 millimeters. The average temperatures in the summer are between 21–24 degrees Celsius and in the winter it is around −4 to 4 degrees Celsius. Pinus virginiana is poorly adapted to fire, but if the tree is larger they are able to survive. Open-growth Virginia pines may begin cone production at only 5 years old. There have been documented cases of trees as young as 18 months beginning to flower. Virginia pine is monecious and some self-pollination is possible, but a significant seed crop requires two trees. Cones take two complete growing seasons to develop. Pollination takes place 13 months after cone formation begins, and dispersal occurs the following autumn. Unlike some other pines, Virginia pine produces cones in all parts of the canopy. Pinus virginiana is reportedly naturalized in southern Ontario

== Ethnobotany ==
Cherokee Native Americans used P. virginiana medicinally for a variety of purposes. Diarrhea, stiffness of the body, colds, fevers, hemorrhoids, tuberculosis, and constipation, among others, are all ailments treated with parts of the tree. Cherokee also used it in certain cultural rituals. In burial, P. virginiana branches were burned and the ashes were used for a fire in their homes. Ball players would consume apple juice infused with P. virginiana needles "for wind" prior to events. Root infusions from the plant may be used as a stimulant and the needles as a soap.

== Etymology ==
The etymology of the Pinus virginiana is as follows: Pinus is Latin for Pine and virginiana means of Virginia.

== Uses ==
Pinus virginiana was used historically as mine timbers, for railroad ties, and for fuel and tar. Currently, it is being planted in reclamation sites for coal mining operations. Pinus virginiana can also be used for wood pulp, which is used to make paper, and for lumber. The wood weighs 32 pounds (14 kg) per foot.

== Conservation ==
On the IUCN Red List of Threatened Species, the Pinus virginiana is considered a species that is of least concern. It is a species of least concern due to its relative commonness as an early successional species. In areas of abandoned farmland in the eastern US, P. virginiana tends to be common.

== Gallery ==
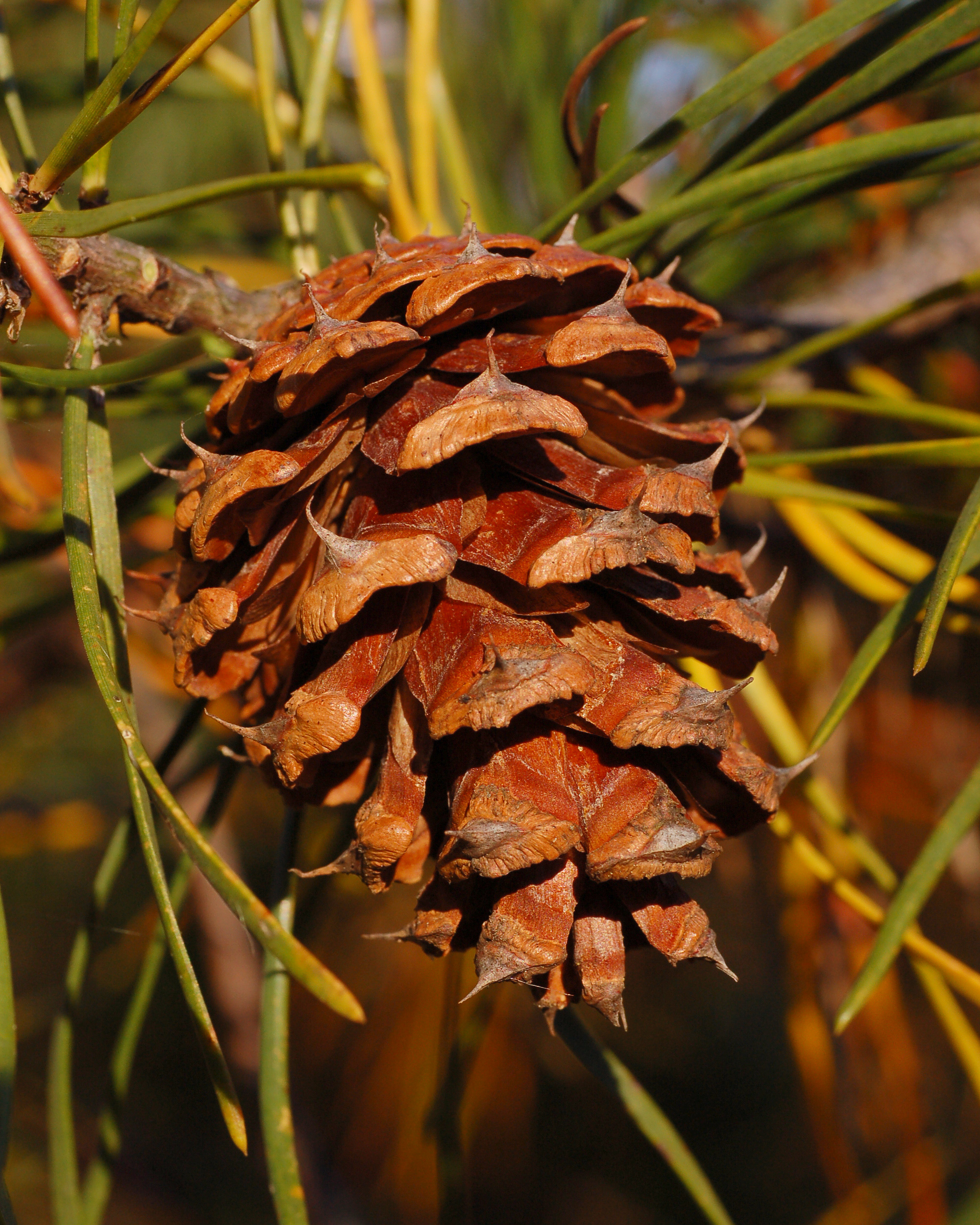
Cone closeup

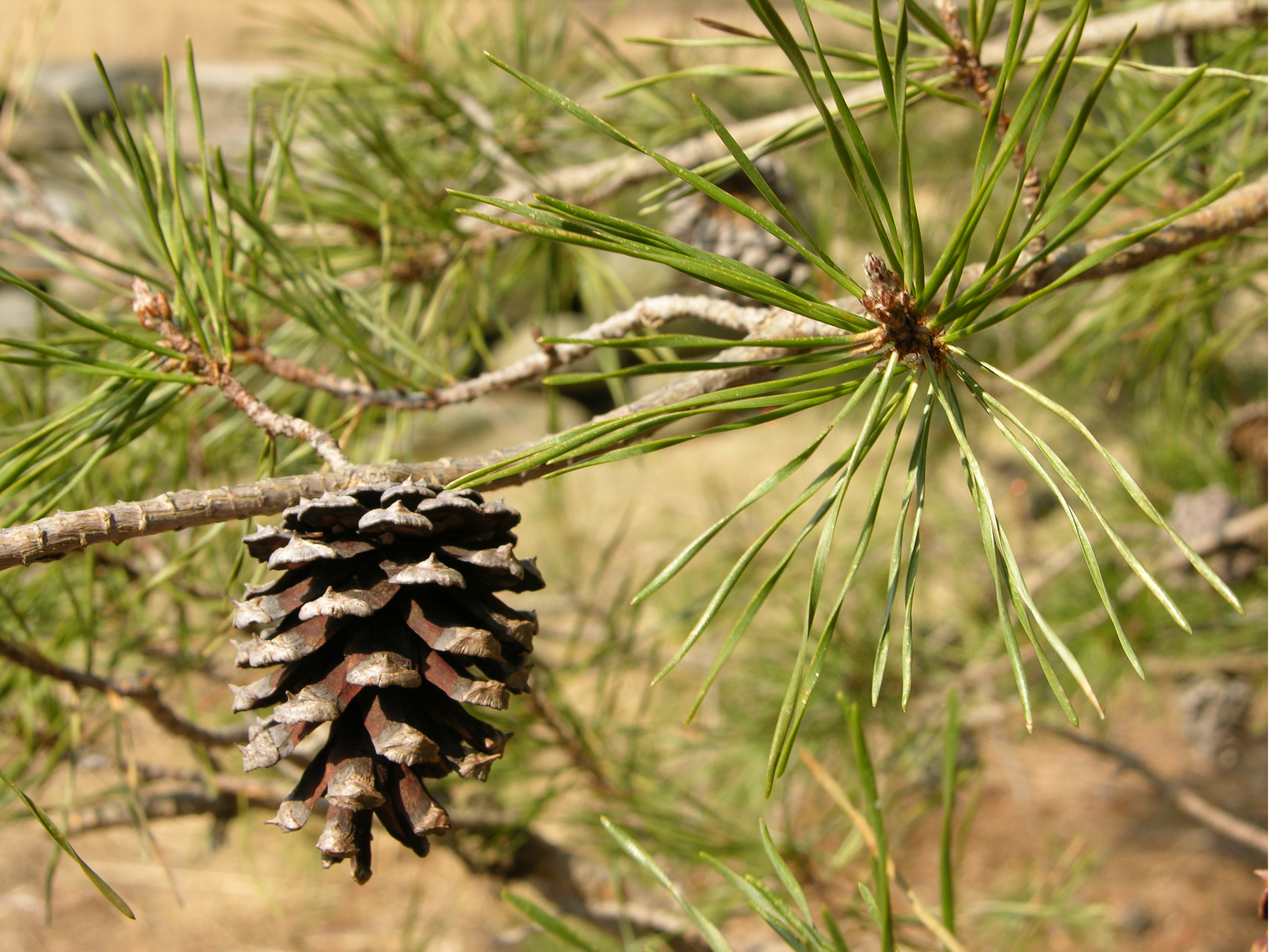
Cone and needles

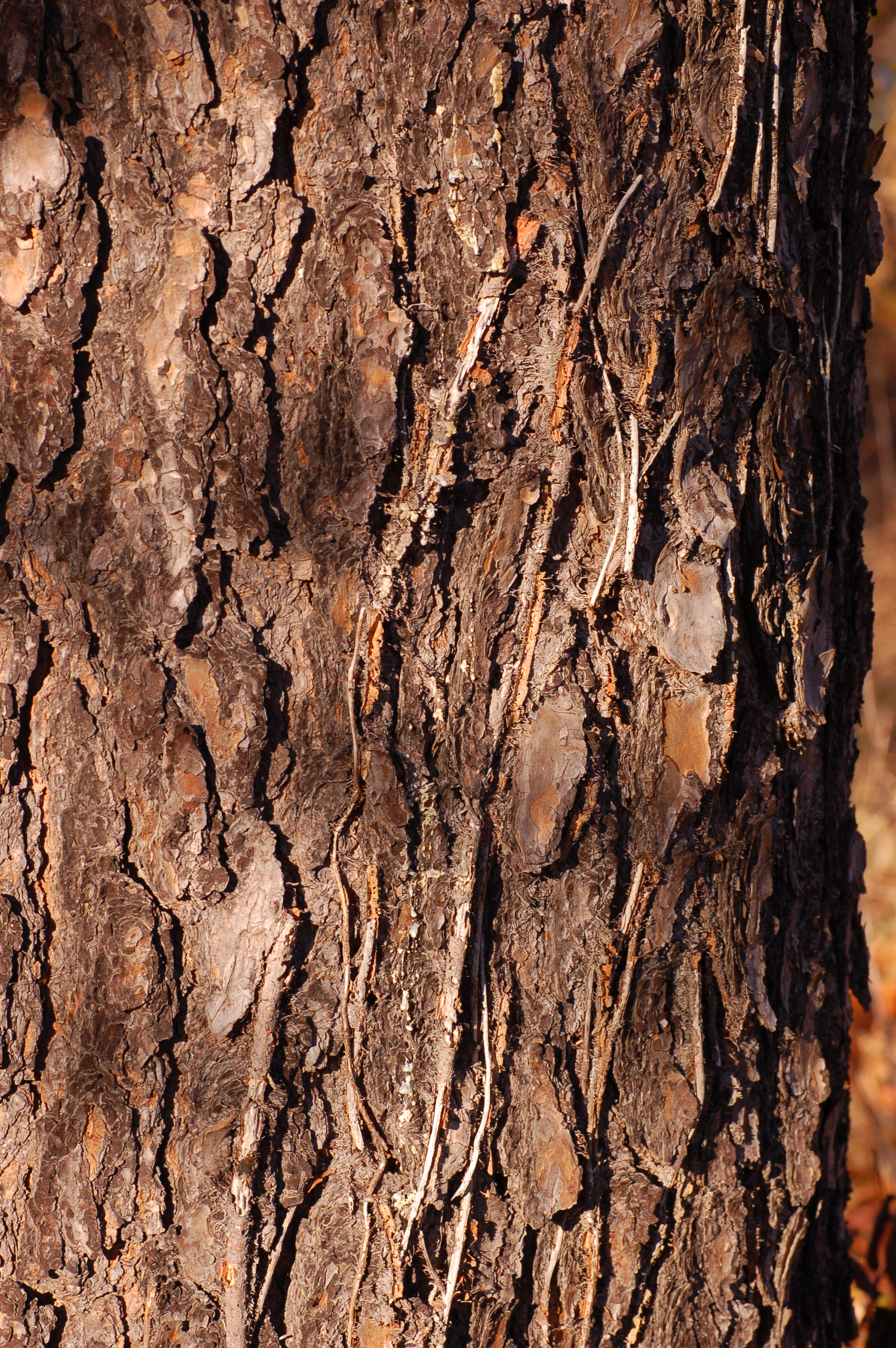
Bark

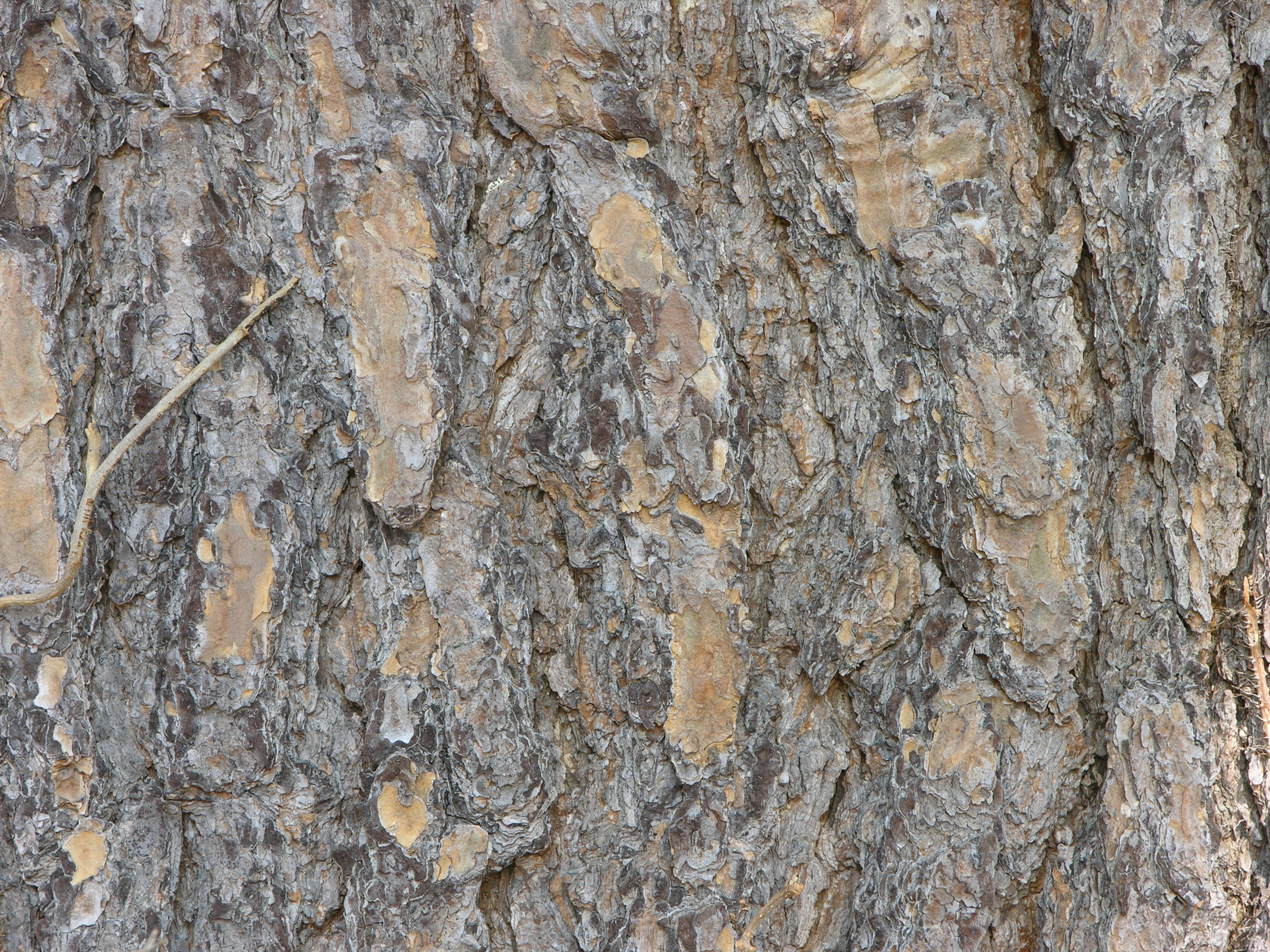
Bark closeup

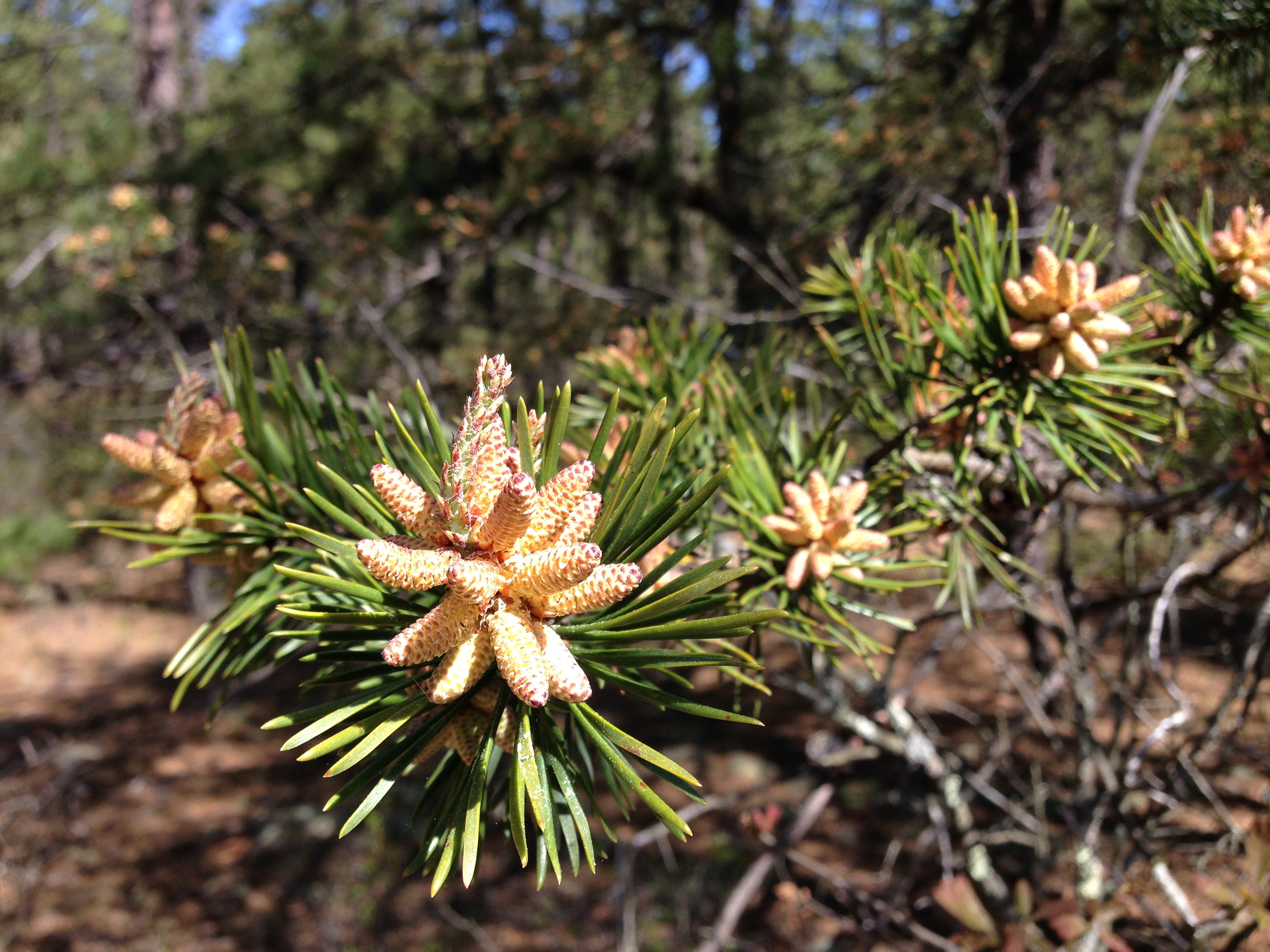
New growth and pollen cones

== See also ==
- Central Appalachian dry oak–pine forest
