= Central Appalachian dry oak–pine forest =

Type of forest

The central Appalachian dry oak–pine forest is a forest system found from Maine south through New Hampshire, Vermont, Massachusetts, Rhode Island, Connecticut, New York, New Jersey, Pennsylvania, Maryland, to West Virginia and Virginia. It is abundant in the low- and mid-elevation central Appalachian Mountains and in the central Piedmont.

These forests occur on dry sites with loamy to sandy soils. A mix of oak and pine tree species dominate the canopy, typically chestnut oak (Quercus prinus), Virginia pine (Pinus virginiana), and white pine (Pinus strobus), but sometimes white oak (Quercus alba) or scarlet oak (Quercus coccinea). Varying amounts of oaks and pines result in oak forests, mixed oak-pine forests, or small pine forests. Shrubs such as hillside blueberry (Vaccinium pallidum), black huckleberry (Gaylussacia baccata), and mountain laurel (Kalmia latifolia) are common in the understory and can form a dense layer.

This system is found on drier sites than the related northeastern interior dry–mesic oak forest. South of central Virginia, it is replaced by the Southern Piedmont dry oak–pine forest.
