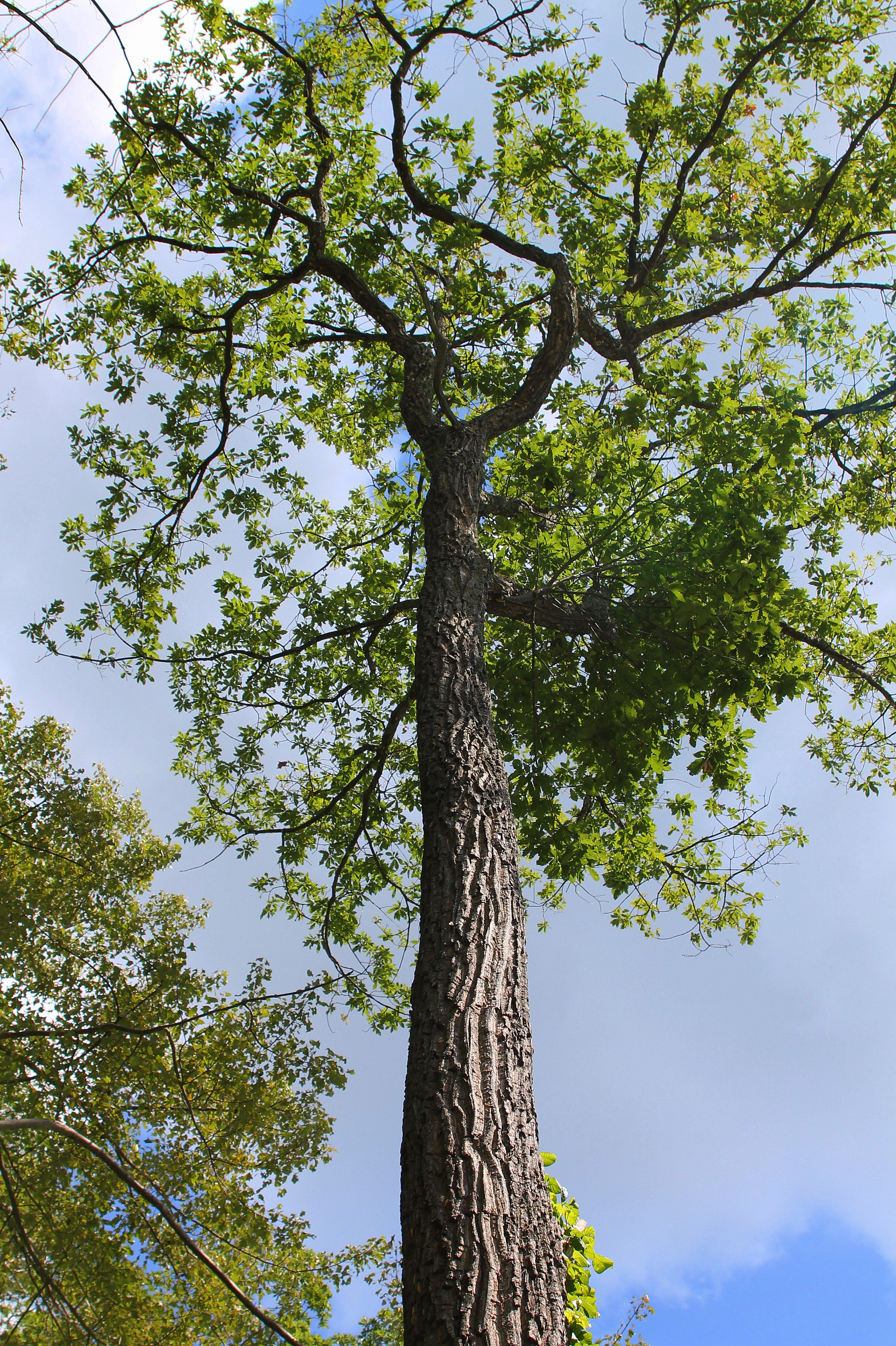
- In Weiser State Forest, Pennsylvania

Conservation status
- Least Concern (IUCN 3.1)

Scientific classification
- Kingdom: Plantae
- Clade: Tracheophytes
- Clade: Angiosperms
- Clade: Eudicots
- Clade: Rosids
- Order: Fagales
- Family: Fagaceae
- Genus: Quercus
- Subgenus: Quercus subg. Quercus
- Section: Quercus sect. Quercus
- Species: Q. montana

Binomial name
- Quercus montana Willd.
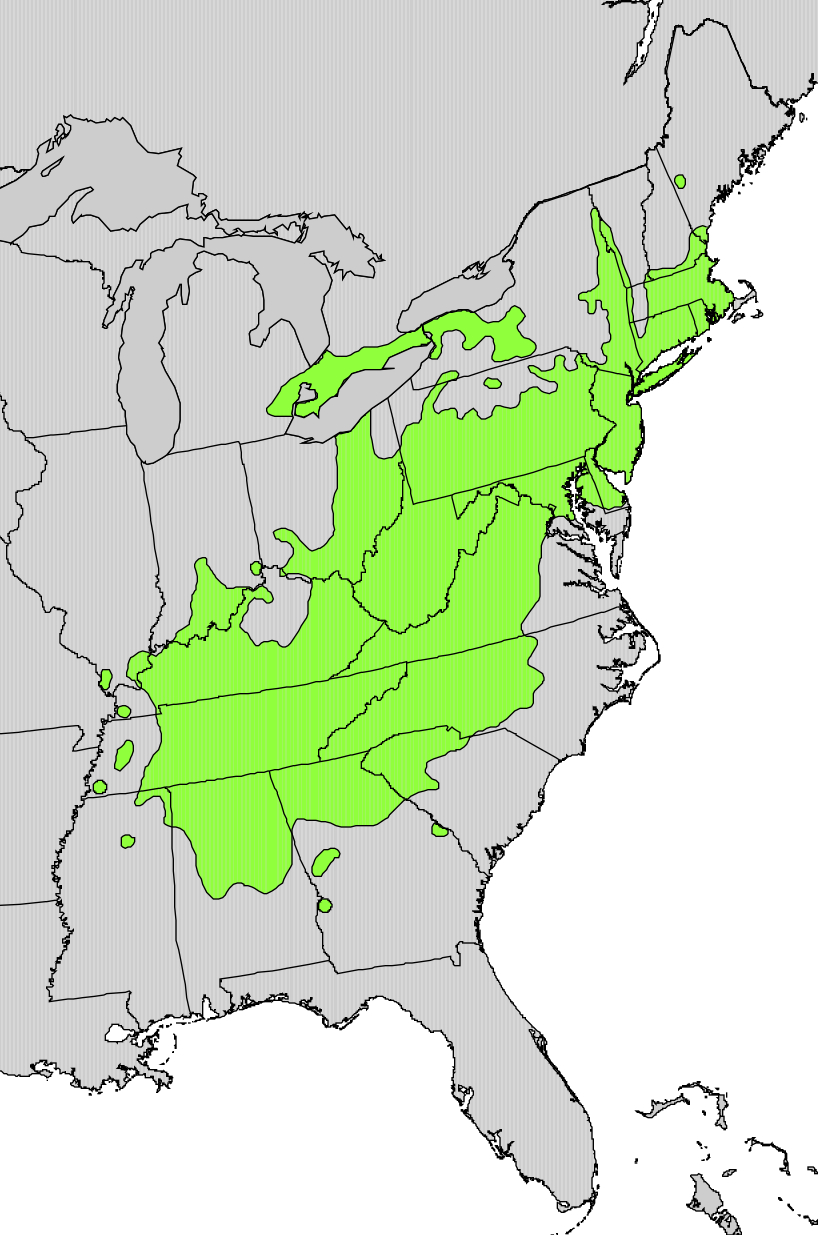
- Natural range

Synonyms
- Quercus prinus L.

= Quercus montana =

Chestnut oak

Species of oak tree

Quercus montana, the chestnut oak, is a species of oak in the white oak group, Quercus sect. Quercus. It is native to the eastern United States, where it is one of the most important ridgetop trees from southern Maine southwest to central Mississippi, with an outlying northwestern population in southern Michigan. It is also sometimes called rock oak because of its presence in montane and other rocky habitats.

== Description ==
As a consequence of its dry habitat and ridgetop exposure, Quercus montana is not usually a large tree, typically growing to 18–22 metres (59–72 feet) tall; specimens growing in better conditions can grow up to 40–43 m (131–141 ft) tall. It tends to have a similar spread of 18–22 m (59–72 ft). A 10-year-old sapling grown in full sun will stand about 5 m (16 ft) tall. This species is often an important canopy species in an oak-heath forest.

It is readily identified by its massively-ridged dark gray-brown bark, the thickest of any eastern North American oak. The leaves are 12–20 centimetres (4 3/4–7 3/4 inches) long and 6–10 cm (2 1/4–4 in) broad, shallowly lobed with 10–15 rounded lobes on each margin; they are virtually identical to the leaves of swamp chestnut oak and chinkapin oak, but the trees can readily be distinguished by the bark, that of the chinkapin oak being a light ash-gray and somewhat peeling like that of the white oak and that of swamp chestnut oak being paler ash-gray and scaly. The chinkapin oak also has much smaller acorns than the chestnut oak. The chestnut oak is easily distinguished from the swamp white oak because that tree has whitened undersides on the leaves. Another important distinction between the chestnut oak and the swamp chestnut oak is by the habitat; if it grows on a ridge, it is chestnut oak, and if it grows in wet bottomlands, it is probably the more massive swamp chestnut oak; however, this is not fully reliable.

Characteristics include:

- Bark: Dark, fissured into broad ridges, scaly. Branchlets stout, at first bronze green, later they become reddish brown, finally dark gray or brown. Heavily charged with tannic acid.
- Wood: Dark brown, sapwood lighter; heavy, hard, strong, tough, close-grained, durable in contact with the soil. Specific gravity 0.7499; weight of cubic foot, 21.20 kilograms or 46.73 pounds.
- Winter buds: Light chestnut brown, ovate, acute, one-fourth to one-half of an inch long.
- Leaves: Alternate, 13 to 23 cm (5 to 9 in) long, 8 to 11 cm (3 to 4 1/2 in) wide, obovate to oblong-lanceolate, wedge-shaped or rounded at base, coarsely crenately toothed, teeth rounded or acute, apex rounded or acute. They come out of the bud convolute, yellow green or bronze, shining above, very pubescent below. When full grown are thick, firm, dark yellow green, somewhat shining above, pale green and pubescent below; midribs stout, yellow, primary veins conspicuous. In autumn they turn a dull yellow soon changing to a yellow brown. Petioles stout or slender, short. Stipules linear to lanceolate, caducous.
- Flowers: May, when leaves are one-third grown. Staminate flowers are borne in hairy catkins (aments) two to three inches long; calyx pale yellow, hairy, deeply seven to nine-lobed; stamens 7 to 9; anthers bright yellow. Pistillate flowers in short spikes; peduncles green, stout, hairy; involucral scales hairy; stigmas short, bright red.
- Acorns: Annual, singly or in pairs; nut oval, rounded or acute at apex, bright chestnut brown, shining, one and a quarter to one and one-half inches in length; cup, cup-shaped or turbinate, usually enclosing one-half or one-third of the nut, thin, light brown and downy within, reddish brown and rough outside, tuberculate near the base. Scales small, much crowded toward the rim sometimes making a fringe. Kernel white, sweetish.

The acorns of the chestnut oak are 1.5–3 cm (1/2–1 1/4 in) long and 1–2 cm (3/8–3/4 in) broad, among the largest of Native American oaks, surpassed in size only by the bur oak and possibly swamp chestnut oak.

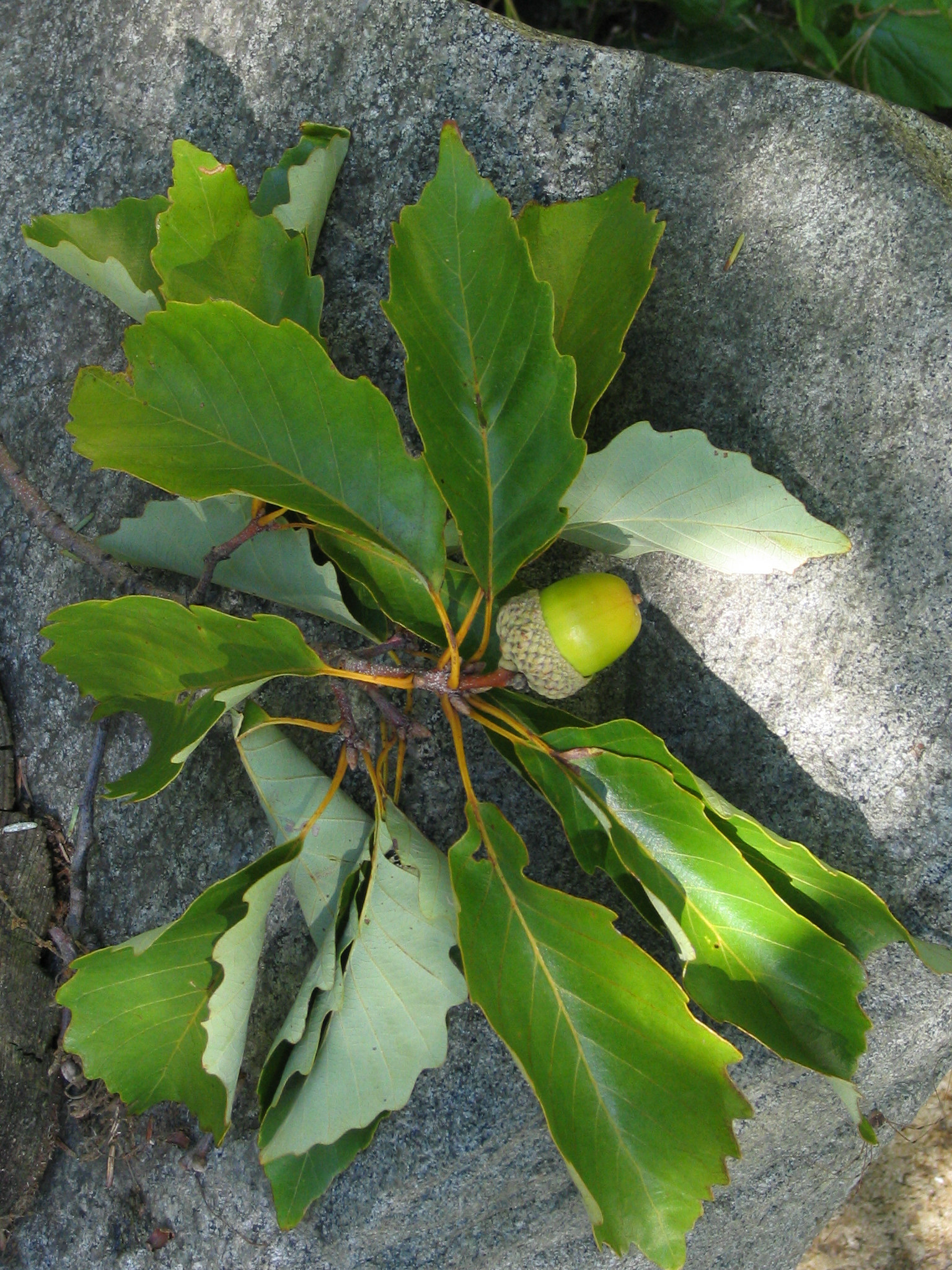
Leaf cluster

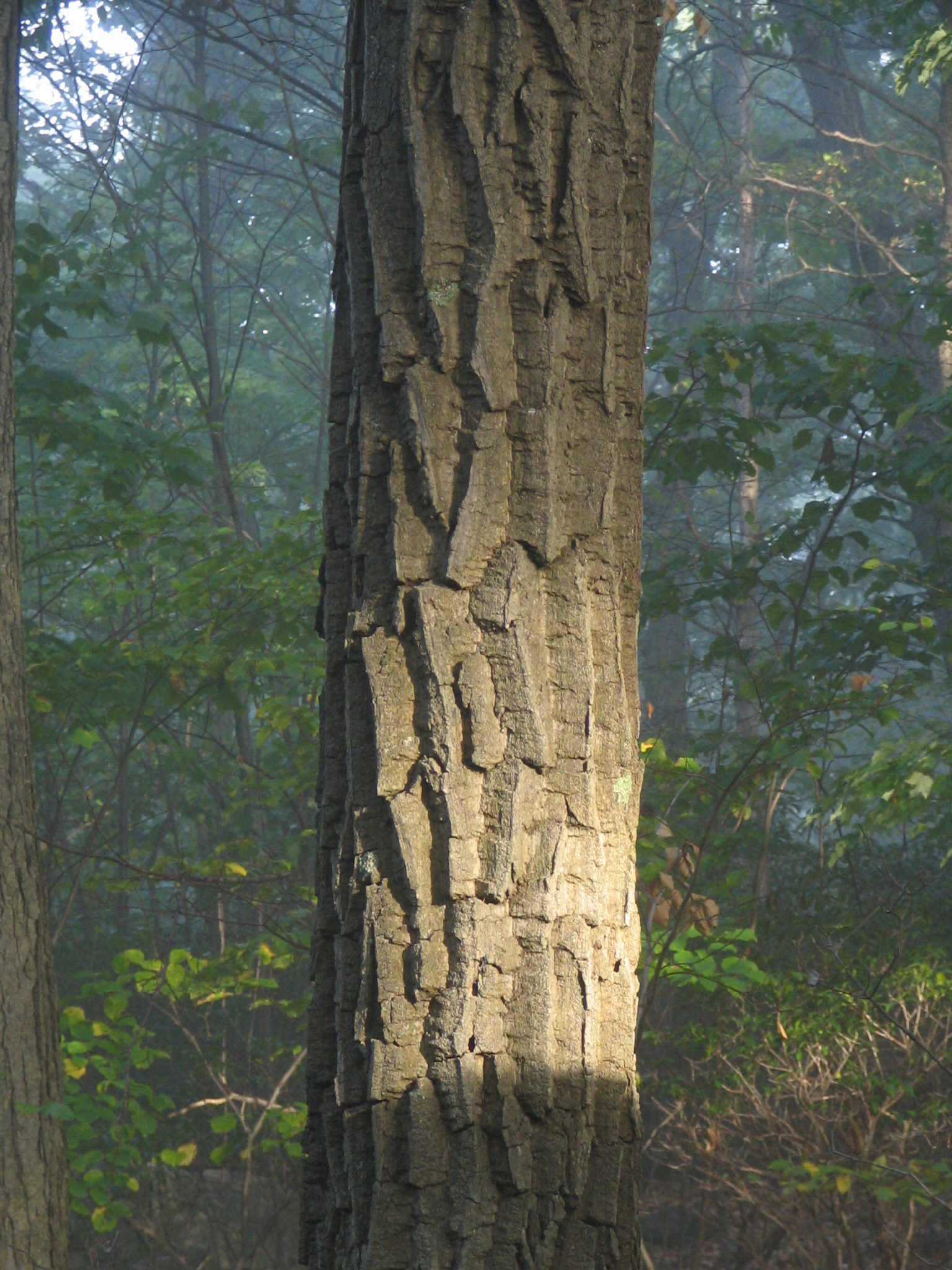
The distinctive bark

== Taxonomy and nomenclature ==
Extensive confusion between the chestnut oak (Quercus montana) and the swamp chestnut oak (Quercus michauxii) has occurred, and some botanists have considered them to be the same species in the past.

The name Quercus prinus was long used by many botanists and foresters for either the chestnut oak or the swamp chestnut oak, with the former otherwise called Q. montana or the latter otherwise called Q. michauxii. The application of the name Q. montana to the chestnut oak is now accepted, since Q. prinus is of uncertain position, unassignable to either species.

The Latin specific epithet montana refers to mountains or coming from mountains which probably refers to the tree's habitat and its ability to grow on rocks.

== Ecology ==
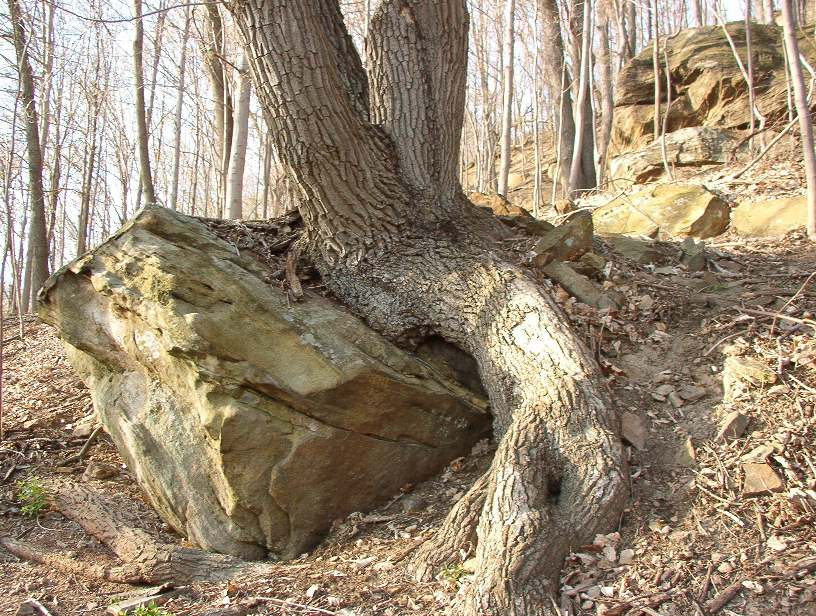
Chestnut oak growing on rock

This species is a predominant ridge-top tree in eastern North American hardwood forests. Young chestnut oaks are easily capable of reproducing from stump sprouts if cut. A significant amount of chestnut oaks in the Appalachians are trees that regrew from stump sprouts after being logged. It is a long-lived tree, with high-quality timber when well-formed. The acorns of the chestnut oak are a valuable wildlife food. Mature chestnut oaks that have thick bark helps them survive most surface fires. When fire kills he above ground stem, the tree can sprout vigorously from the root crown. Fire can also remove deep leaf litter that would otherwise inhibit acorn gemination, although sprouting is the main means of regeneration after fire.

Q. montana trees mast or produce more acorns under warmer summer temperatures rather than cooler summer temperatures. The results of a "thin and burn treatment" proved that increased light and resources correlated with a greater acorn yield. Associated with this, the Chestnut Oak drops it acorns around 2-5 weeks before many other native Oak species. This is due to the fact that Chestnut Oak acorns have no dormancy which means they must begin germinating instantly. This also helps with succession due to the acorns dropping before the peak foraging season.

== Uses ==
Chestnut oak trees are generally not the best timber trees because they are usually branched low and not very straight, but when they grow in better conditions, they are valuable for timber, which is marketed as 'mixed white oak'. The bark of chestnut oak has a high tannin content and prior to the 20th century was heavily used in the leather tanning industry, but the wood was usually discarded since it was considered inferior to that of Q. alba. By the late 19th century, as the population of mature white oaks in the eastern US was dwindling, loggers began exploiting chestnut oak wood more heavily. It serves many of the same applications as white oak wood and as it is fairly rot-proof, has also been used for fencing, railroad ties, and other uses where the wood comes into contact with soil. Due to a relatively high density (21 kg or 47 lb per cu. ft), chestnut oak makes excellent firewood.

The acorns can be eaten by humans but, if bitter, may need to have the tannins leached.

== See also ==
- Central Appalachian dry oak–pine forest
