= List of old-growth forests =

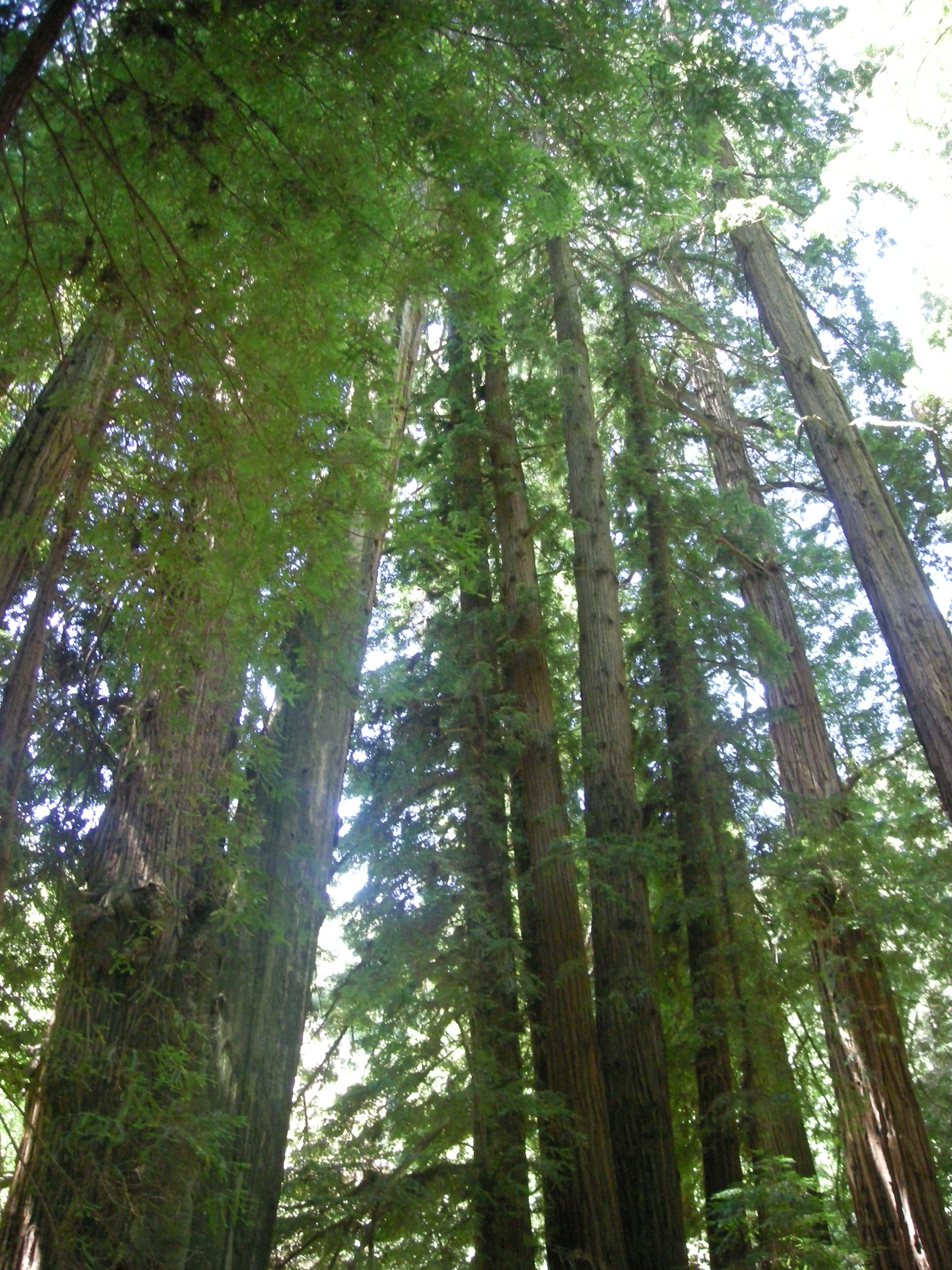
Redwood trees at Muir Woods National Monument, California

This is a list of areas of existing old-growth forest which include at least 10 acres (4.0 hectares) of old growth. Ecoregion information from "Terrestrial Ecoregions of the World".

(The terms "old growth" and "virgin" may have various definitions and meanings throughout the world. See old-growth forest for more information.)

== Africa ==
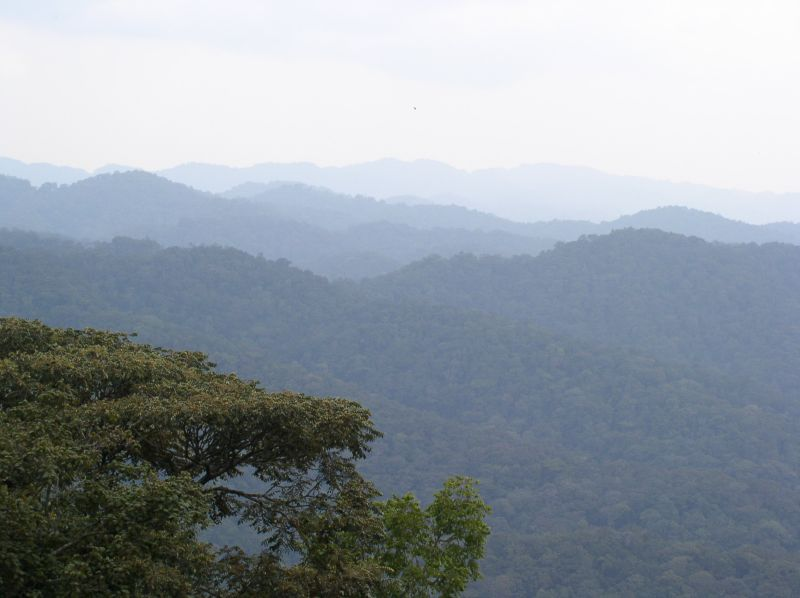
Bwindi Impenetrable Forest, Uganda

Country	Area	Old-growth extent	WWF ecoregion	Old-growth forest type
Democratic Republic of the Congo	Salonga National Park		Central Congolian lowland forests	
Réunion (France)	Réserve biologique intégrale du Bois des Nèfles	179 hectares (440 acres)	Tropical and subtropical dry broadleaf forests	
Réunion (France)	Réserve biologique intégrale du Piton de la Fournaise	21,005 hectares (51,900 acres)	Tropical and subtropical moist broadleaf forests	
Réunion (France)	Réserve biologique intégrale du Mazerin	2,491 hectares (6,160 acres)	Tropical and subtropical dry broadleaf forests	Pandanus scrub
Kenya	Kakamega Forest			

== Asia ==
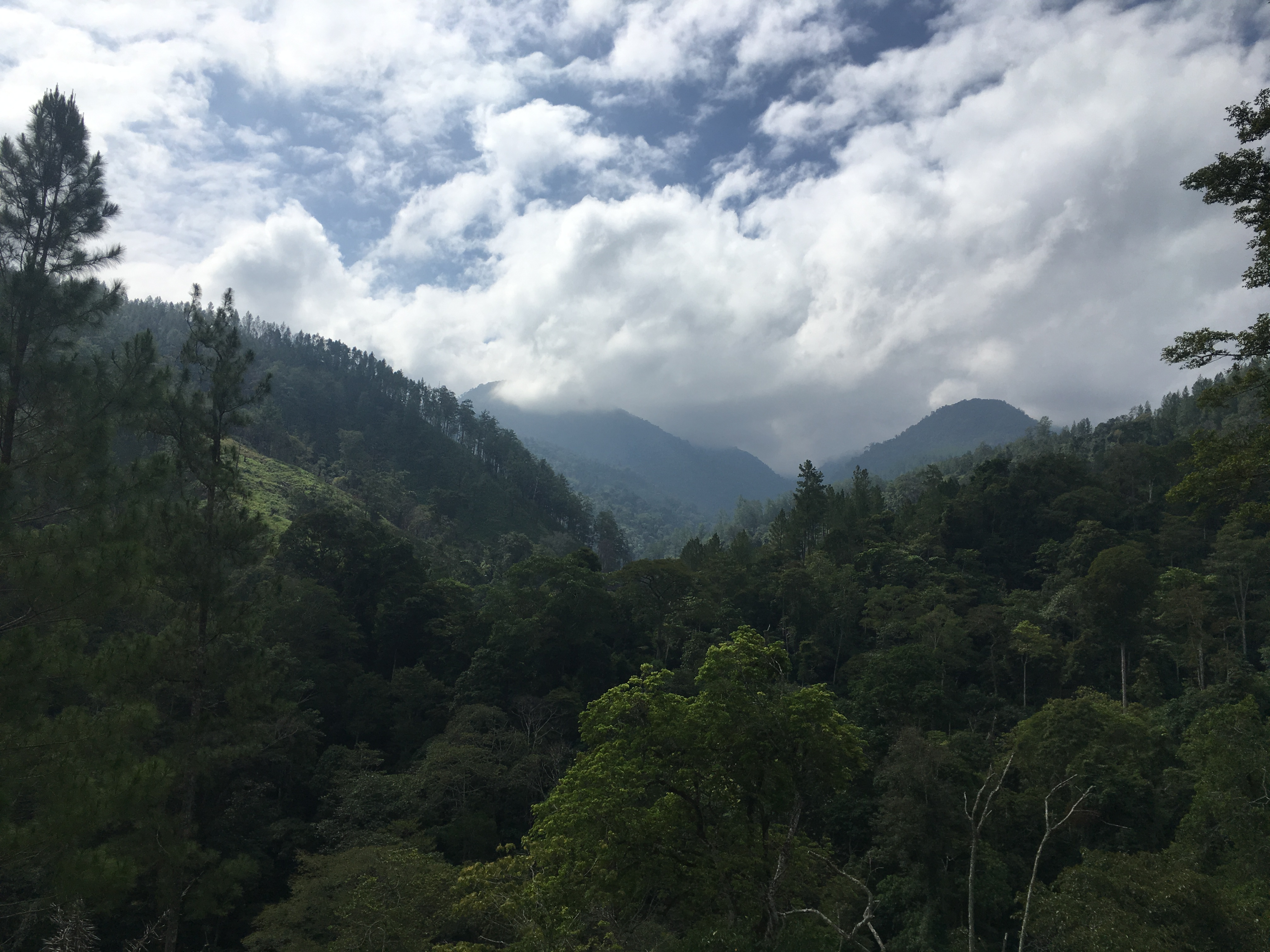
Gunung Leuser National Park, Indonesia

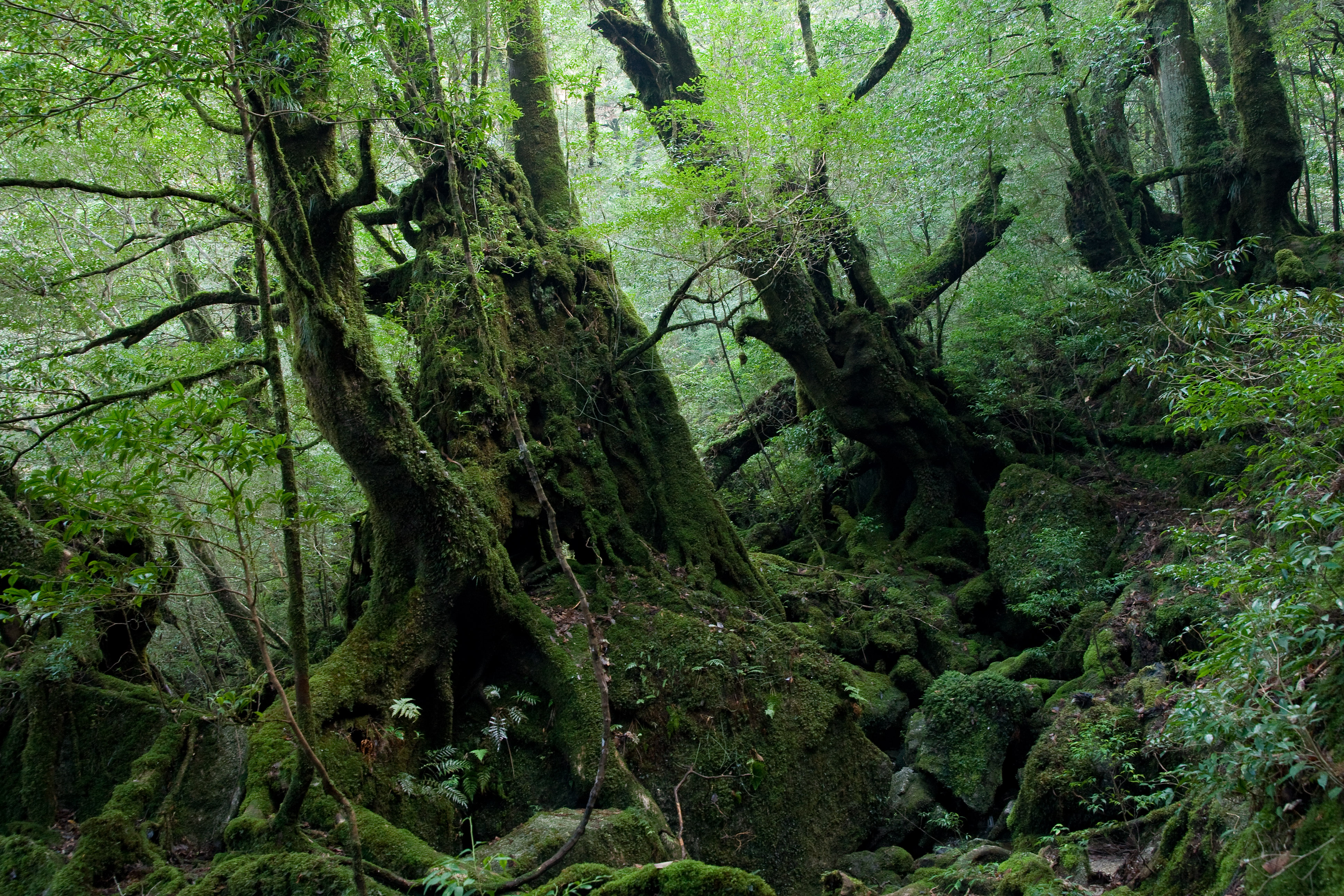
Yakushima, Japan

Country	Area	Old-growth extent	WWF ecoregion	Old-growth forest type
Bangladesh and India	Sundarbans		Sundarbans	Mangrove forest
Cambodia	Prey Lang		Tropical and subtropical dry broadleaf forests	
Georgia	Kintrishi Protected Landscape		Euxine-Colchic deciduous forests	temperate broadleaf rainforest
Georgia	Lagodekhi Protected Areas		Caucasus mixed forests	temperate broadleaf forest
Georgia	Mtirala National Park		Euxine-Colchic deciduous forests	temperate broadleaf rainforest
India	Dudhatoli Mountains, Uttarakhand	6,000 hectares (15,000 acres)	Western Himalayan broadleaf forests and subalpine conifer forests	temperate broadleaf mixed forests and montane forests biome
Indonesia	Leuser Ecosystem		Sumatran montane rain forests Sumatran lowland rain forests	tropical rainforest tropical montane forest
Indonesia	Lorentz National Park		New Guinea mangroves Southern New Guinea lowland forests New Guinea montane forests	
Indonesia	Mamberamo Foja Wildlife Reserve		Northern New Guinea lowland rain and freshwater swamp forests Northern New Guinea montane rain forests	
Iran	Coast along the Caspian Sea and the northern slopes of the Alborz mountains		Caspian Hyrcanian mixed forest	temperate broadleaf and mixed forests biome
Japan	Shiretoko National Park		Hokkaido deciduous forests, Hokkaido montane conifer forests	temperate and subalpine mixed forest
Japan	Yakushima Wilderness Area		Nansei Islands subtropical evergreen forests, Taiheiyo evergreen forests	subtropical and temperate rainforest
Japan	Kasugayama Primeval Forest		Taiheiyo evergreen forests	
Malaysia	Belum-Temengor		Peninsular Malaysian rain forests	
Malaysia	Danum Valley		Borneo lowland rain forests	
Malaysia	Taman Negara		Peninsular Malaysian rain forests	
Malaysia	Ulu Muda Forest		Peninsular Malaysian rain forests	
Pakistan	Ziarat Juniper Forest		East Afghan montane conifer forests	
Russia	Central Sikhote-Alin		Ussuri broadleaf and mixed forests	
Russia	Virgin Komi Forests		Urals montane tundra and taiga	Coniferous
Russia	Western Caucasus		Caucasus mixed forests	
Sri Lanka	Kanneliya-Dediyagala-Nakiyadeniya Forest Complex		Sri Lanka dry-zone dry evergreen forests	Tropical and subtropical dry broadleaf forests
Sri Lanka	Sinharaja Forest Reserve		Sri Lanka dry-zone dry evergreen forests	Tropical and subtropical dry broadleaf forests
Taiwan	Yushan National Park		Taiwan subtropical evergreen forests	Taiwania

== Australia ==
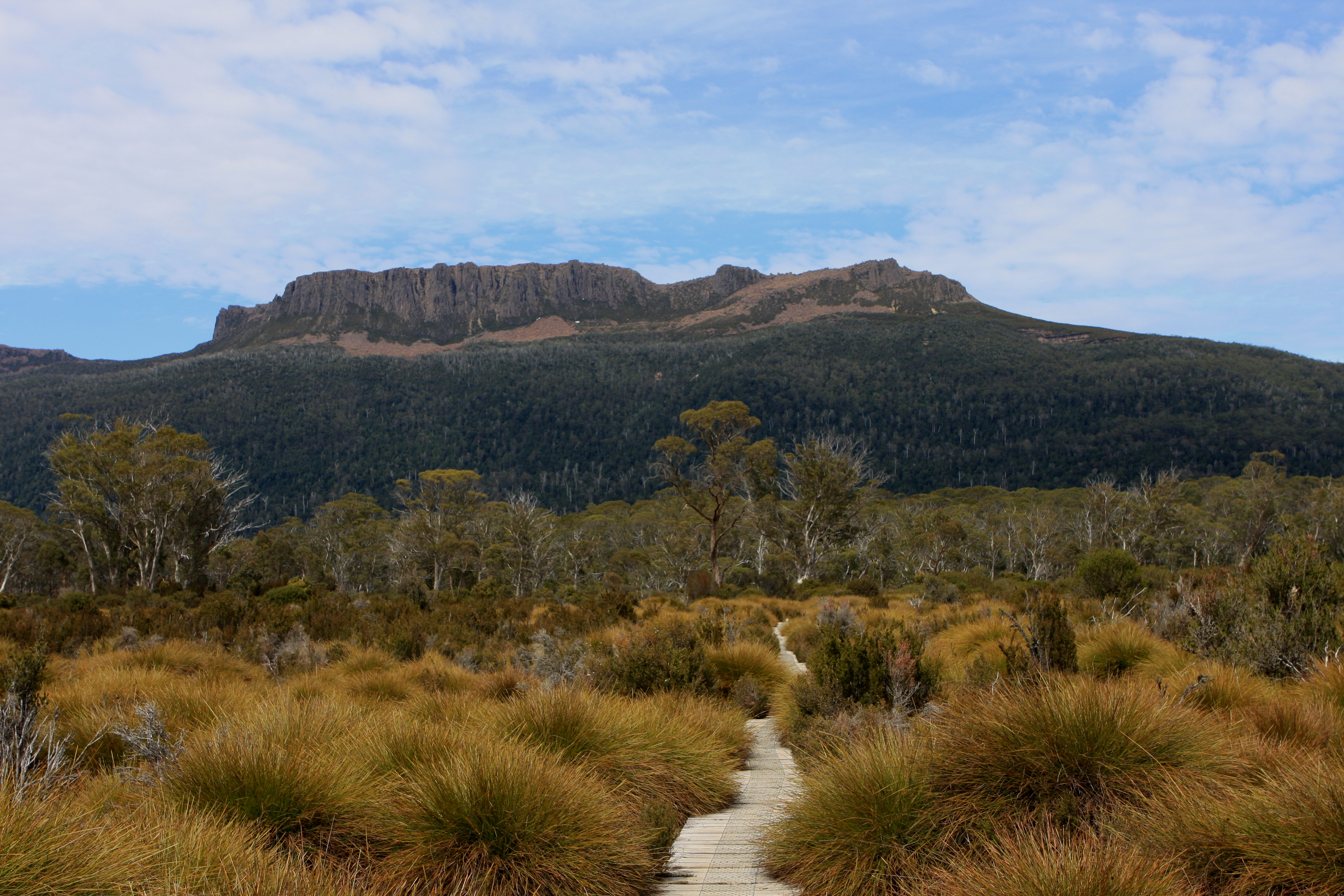
Eucalyptus forest in the Cradle Mountain-Lake St Clair National Park

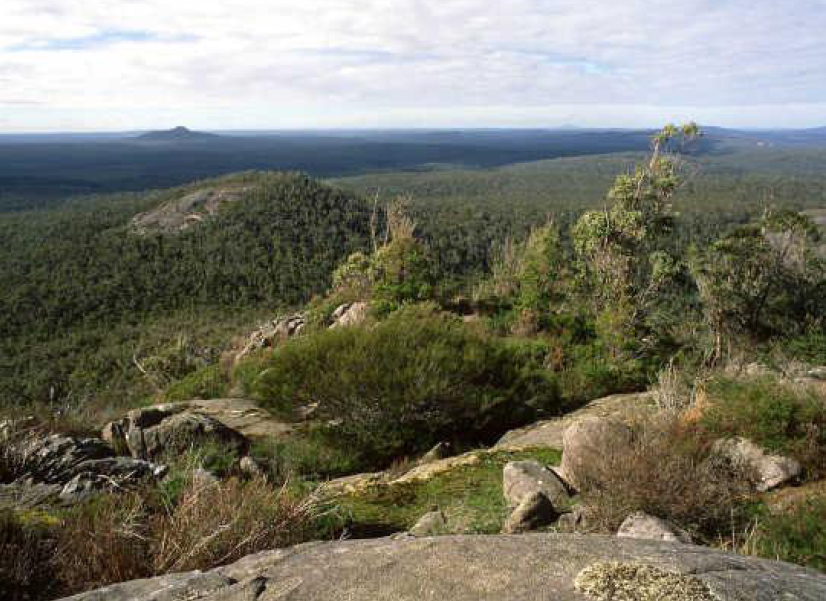
Walpole Wilderness Area

In Australia, the 1992 National Forest Policy Statement (NFPS) made specific provision for the protection of old growth forests. The NFPS initiated a process for undertaking assessments of forests for conservation values, including old growth values. A working group of state and Australian Government agencies took the NFPS definition into consideration in developing a definition that was accepted by all governments (JANIS 1997).

Old growth forest is ecologically mature forest where the effects of disturbances are now negligible.

— JANIS 1997

In 2008, only a relatively small area (15%) of Australia's forests (mostly tall, wet forests) had been assessed for old-growth values.

Of the 23 million hectares (57 million acres) of forest in Australia assessed for their old-growth status, 5 million hectares (12 million acres) (22%) is classified as old-growth. Almost half of Australia's identified old-growth forest is in NSW, mostly on public land. More than 73% of Australia's identified old-growth forests are in formal or informal nature conservation reserves.

In 2001, Western Australia became the first state in Australia to cease logging in old-growth forests.

Country	Area	Old-growth extent	WWF ecoregion	Old-growth forest type
Australia	Walpole Wilderness Area, Western Australia		Jarrah-Karri forest and shrublands	Karri, Jarrah, Eucalyptus jacksonii, Eucalyptus guilfoylei
Australia	Barrington Tops National Park, New South Wales		Eastern Australian temperate forests	subtropical and temperate rainforest and eucalypt
Australia	Greater Blue Mountains Area, New South Wales		Eastern Australian temperate forests	eucalypt forest
Australia	Tarkine, Tasmania	2,000 square kilometres (770 sq mi)	Tasmanian temperate rain forests	Temperate rainforest
Australia	Tasmanian Wilderness		Tasmanian temperate rain forests	temperate rainforest and eucalypt forest
Australia	Goolengook, East Gippsland, Victoria	Over 20 square kilometres (7.7 sq mi)	Eastern Australian temperate forests	rare warm temperate/cool temperate "Overlap Rainforest"
Australia	Blue Tier, Tasmania	100 hectares (250 acres)	Tasmanian temperate rain forests	myrtle canopy, unusually diverse understorey for temperate rainforest (celery top pine, waratah, sassafras, tree fern), threatened Simson's Stag Beetle.
Australia	Styx Forest, Tasmania		Tasmanian temperate rain forests	
Australia	Weld, Tasmania		Tasmanian temperate rain forests	
Australia	Upper Florentine Valley, Tasmania		Tasmanian temperate rain forests	
Australia	Badja State Forest, New South Wales		Eastern Australian temperate forests	Wet old-growth with sweeping tree-fern understoreys. 10+ threatened species (including squirrel glider and golden-tipped bat)
Australia	Dampier State Forest, New South Wales		Eastern Australian temperate forests	Wet old-growth. Most extensive rainforests in the South Coast.
Australia	Wandella / Peak Alone, New South Wales		Eastern Australian temperate forests	High old-growth and threatened species values. Important catchment value.
Australia	Monga State Forest / Buckenbowra, New South Wales		Eastern Australian temperate forests	Pristine Buckenbowra River, including an area on the northern side of the river with a golden-tipped bat record. Also an area around McGregors Creek, nominated for wilderness, and important for old-growth and to increase the viability of the connection / link between Buckenbowra and Deua National Park.
Australia	Dampier, New South Wales		Eastern Australian temperate forests	Upper Deua River (Identified Wilderness) and Big Belimba Creek catchment and contains extensive old-growth forests. Big Belimba Creek contains giant wet old-growth forest and extensive tree-fern forests.
Australia	Tallaganda State Forest, New South Wales		Eastern Australian temperate forests	Tall wet old-growth forest.
Australia	Gondwana Rainforests of Australia	50 separate reserves totaling 366,500 hectares (906,000 acres)	Subtropical rainforest	The most extensive area of subtropical rainforest in the world. Extremely high conservation value; over 200 rare or threatened plant and animal species.

The term "old-growth forests" is rarely used in New Zealand, instead, "The Bush" is used to refer to native forests. There are large contiguous areas of forest cover that are protected areas.

== Europe ==
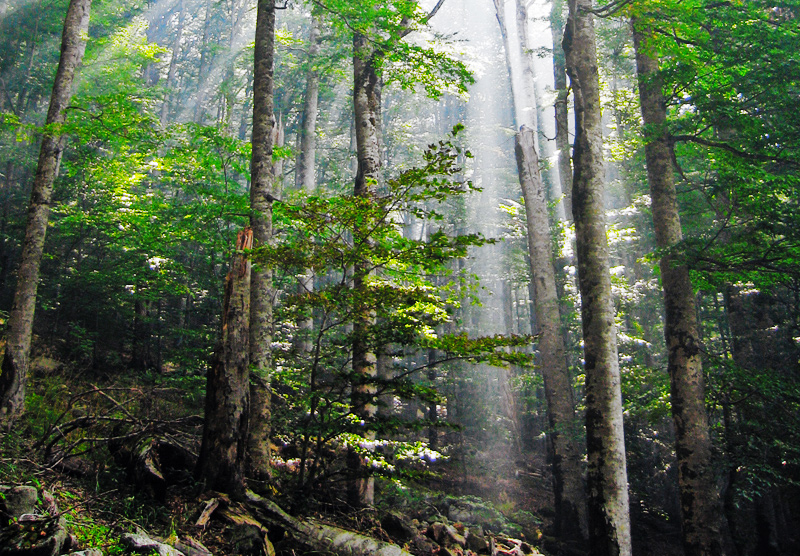
Biogradska Gora, Montenegro

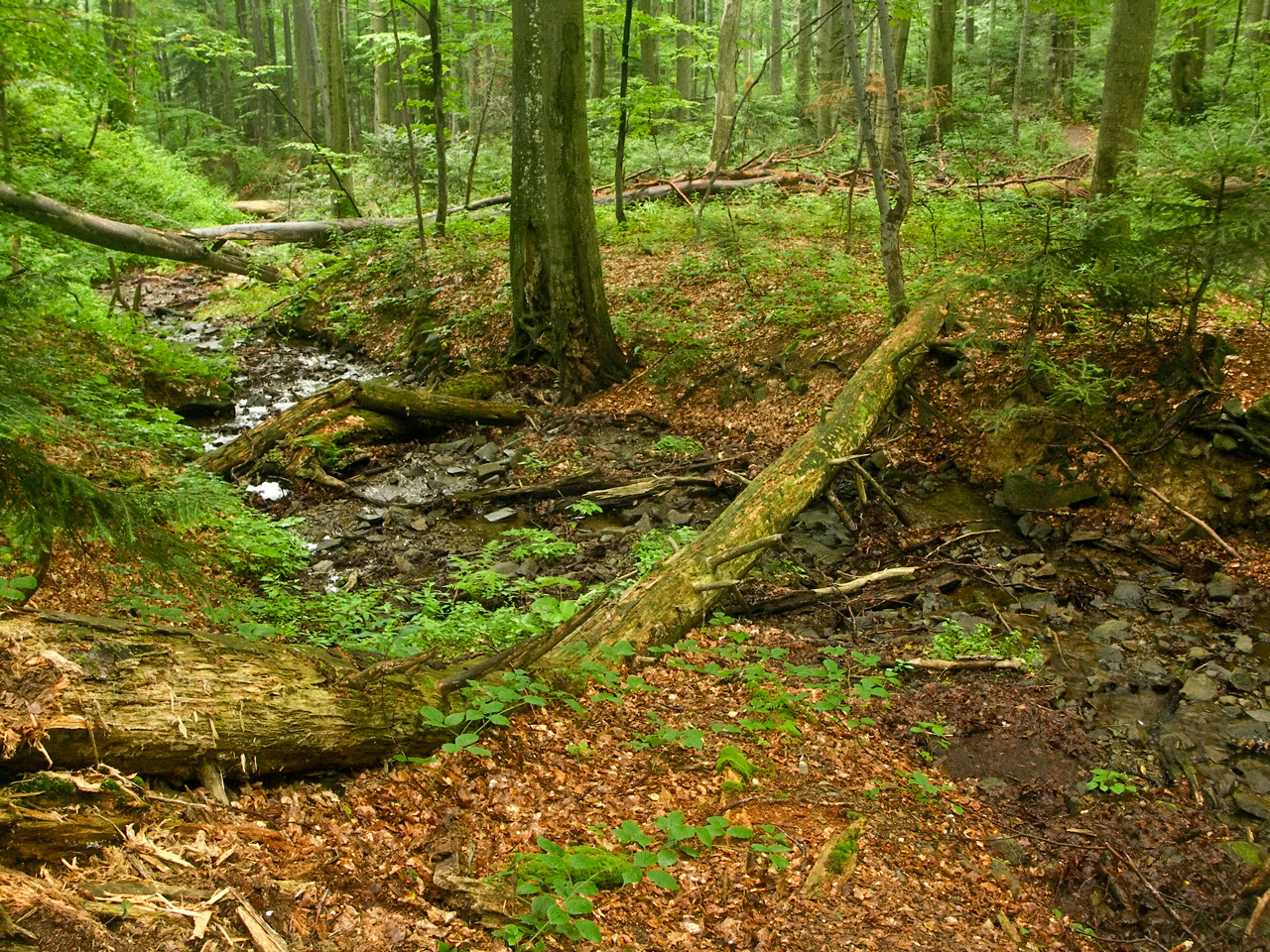
Primeval Beech Forests of the Carpathians

Country	Area	Old-growth extent	WWF ecoregion	Old-growth forest type
Austria	Kalkalpen National Park	UNESCO World Heritage protected beech forests: 5,262 hectares; primary forest remains: 400 hectares		Temperate broadleaf and mixed forests biome
Austria	Wildnisgebiet Dürrenstein (incl. primary forest Rothwald)	Total: 7,000 hectares; UNESCO World Heritage protected beech forests: 3,685.27 hectares; Rothwald: 420 hectares		Temperate broadleaf and mixed forests biome
Azerbaijan	Lankaran lowland and Talysh mountains		Caspian Hyrcanian mixed forest	temperate broadleaf and mixed forests biome
Belarus, Poland	Białowieża Forest	308,580 hectares (762,500 acres)	Central European mixed forests	
Bosnia and Herzegovina	Perućica	1,434 hectares (3,540 acres)	Dinaric Mountains mixed forests	Temperate mixed forest. Prevailing species: Fagus sylvatica, Abies alba, Picea abies.
Bosnia and Herzegovina	Ravna Vala	45.04 hectares (111.3 acres)	Dinaric Mountains mixed forests	
Bulgaria	Ancient and Primeval Beech Forests of Europe in the Central Balkan National Park	1,098,891 hectares (2,715,420 acres)	Rodope montane mixed forests	Temperate broadleaf and mixed forests biome
Bulgaria	Bayuvi Dupki–Dzhindzhiritsa (temperate coniferous forest), Pirin National Park	2,873 hectares (7,100 acres)	Rodope montane mixed forests	Temperate broadleaf and mixed forests biome
Bulgaria	Mantaritza Biosphere Reserve forests	1,320 hectares (3,300 acres)	Rodope montane mixed forests	Temperate broadleaf and mixed forests biome
Bulgaria	Parangalitsa Reserve forests, Rila National Park	1,509 hectares (3,730 acres)	Rodope montane mixed forests	Temperate broadleaf and mixed forests biome
Bulgaria	Uzunbodzhak Reserve temperate rainforest, Strandzha Nature Park, Strandzha Mountain	2,529.6 hectares (6,251 acres)	Euxine-Colchic deciduous forests	Temperate broadleaf and mixed forests biome (Euxine-Colchic deciduous forests)
Czech Republic	Boubin Primeval Forest	685.9 hectares (1,695 acres); core zone (primary forest): 46 hectares		
Estonia	Järvselja Nature Reserve	184 hectares (450 acres)	Scandinavian and Russian taiga	Variety of succession stages between carrs and Scots pine dominated taiga
Finland	Pyhä-Häkki National Park		Scandinavian and Russian taiga	Scots pine and Norway spruce
France	Réserve Biologique Intégrale d'Assan	1,032 hectares (2,550 acres)	Temperate coniferous forest	Pinus sylvestris, Abies alba, Larix decidua, Juniperus thurifera and Pinus uncinata
France	Réserve Biologique Intégrale de Chaux	148 hectares (370 acres)	Temperate broadleaf and mixed forest	Abies alba, Picea abies and Fagus sylvatica
France	Réserve Biologique Intégrale de la Glacière	28 hectares (69 acres)	Temperate broadleaf and mixed forest	Abies alba, Picea abies and Fagus sylvatica
France	Réserve Biologique Intégrale de la Sainte-Baume	138 hectares (340 acres)	Temperate broadleaf and mixed forest	Fagus sylvatica, Quercus pubescens, Taxus baccata, Ilex aquifolium, Tilia cordata, maple and Quercus ilex
France	Réserve Biologique Intégrale de la Sylve d’Argenson	2,579 hectares (6,370 acres)	Temperate broadleaf and mixed forest	Fagus sylvatica, Quercus petraea and Quercus robur
France	Réserve Biologique Intégrale de Saint-Pé-de-Bigorre	1,010 hectares (2,500 acres)	Temperate broadleaf and mixed forest	Fagus sylvatica, Tilia cordata and Maple
France	Réserve Biologique Intégrale des Maures	2,531 hectares (6,250 acres)	Mediterranean forests, woodlands, and scrub	Quercus ilex, Quercus suber, Castanea sativa and Pinus pinaster
France	Réserve Biologique Intégrale du Mont Ventoux	906 hectares (2,240 acres)	Temperate broadleaf and mixed forest	Pinus uncinata, Pinus nigra, Pinus sylvestris, Fagus sylvatica and Abies alba
France	Réserve Biologique Intégrale du Défilé de Straiture	124 hectares (310 acres)	Temperate broadleaf and mixed forest	Abies alba, Picea abies and Fagus sylvatica
France	Réserve Biologique Intégrale d'Oléron - Saint-Trojan	158 hectares (390 acres)	Temperate broadleaf and mixed forest	Quercus ilex, Quercus petraea and Pinus pinaster
France	Réserve Biologique Intégrale du Bois du Ruère	64 hectares (160 acres)	Temperate broadleaf and mixed forest	Fagus sylvatica, Quercus robur, Carpinus betulus, Tilia cordata and Maple
France	Réserve Biologique Intégrale du Vercors	2,160 hectares (5,300 acres)	Temperate broadleaf and mixed forest	Abies alba, Picea abies and Fagus sylvatica
Croatia	Klepina Duliba Old Growth forest	118 hectares (290 acres)	Temperate broadleaf and mixed forest	Abies alba,Picea abies and Fagus sylvatica
Italy	Valle Cervara	50 hectares (120 acres)	Oldest beech forest in Europe	temperate broadleaf and mixed forests biome. Fagus sylvatica Taxus. /lex, several Betulaceae (Carpinus spp., Ostrya. Corylus, Alnus cordata in some areas, Betula), Ulmus spp. (surtout U glabra), Fraxinus ornus (more rarely F excelsior) and Acer (A. opalus s.l., A. pseudoplatanus, A. platanoides, A. /obelii)
Montenegro	Biogradska Gora		Dinaric Mountains mixed forests	temperate broadleaf and mixed forest
Montenegro	Crna Poda		Dinaric Mountains mixed forests	Coniferous
Norway	Trillemarka		Scandinavian and Russian taiga	
Norway	Stabbursdalen National Park		Scandinavian and Russian taiga	
Norway	Øvre Dividal National Park		Scandinavian and Russian taiga, Scandinavian montane birch forest and grasslands	
Romania	Retezat National Park		Carpathian montane conifer forests	
Serbia	Vinatovača	37 hectares (91 acres)	Temperate broadleaf and mixed forest	Fagus sylvatica
Slovakia	Stužica	761.5 hectares (1,882 acres)	Pannonian mixed forests	European beech
Ukraine	Carpathian Biosphere Reserve	57,880 hectares (143,000 acres)	Ancient and Primeval Beech Forests of the Carpathians and Other Regions of Europe	
United Kingdom	Forest of Dean			mixed woodland
United Kingdom	Puzzlewood			

== North America ==
=== Canada ===
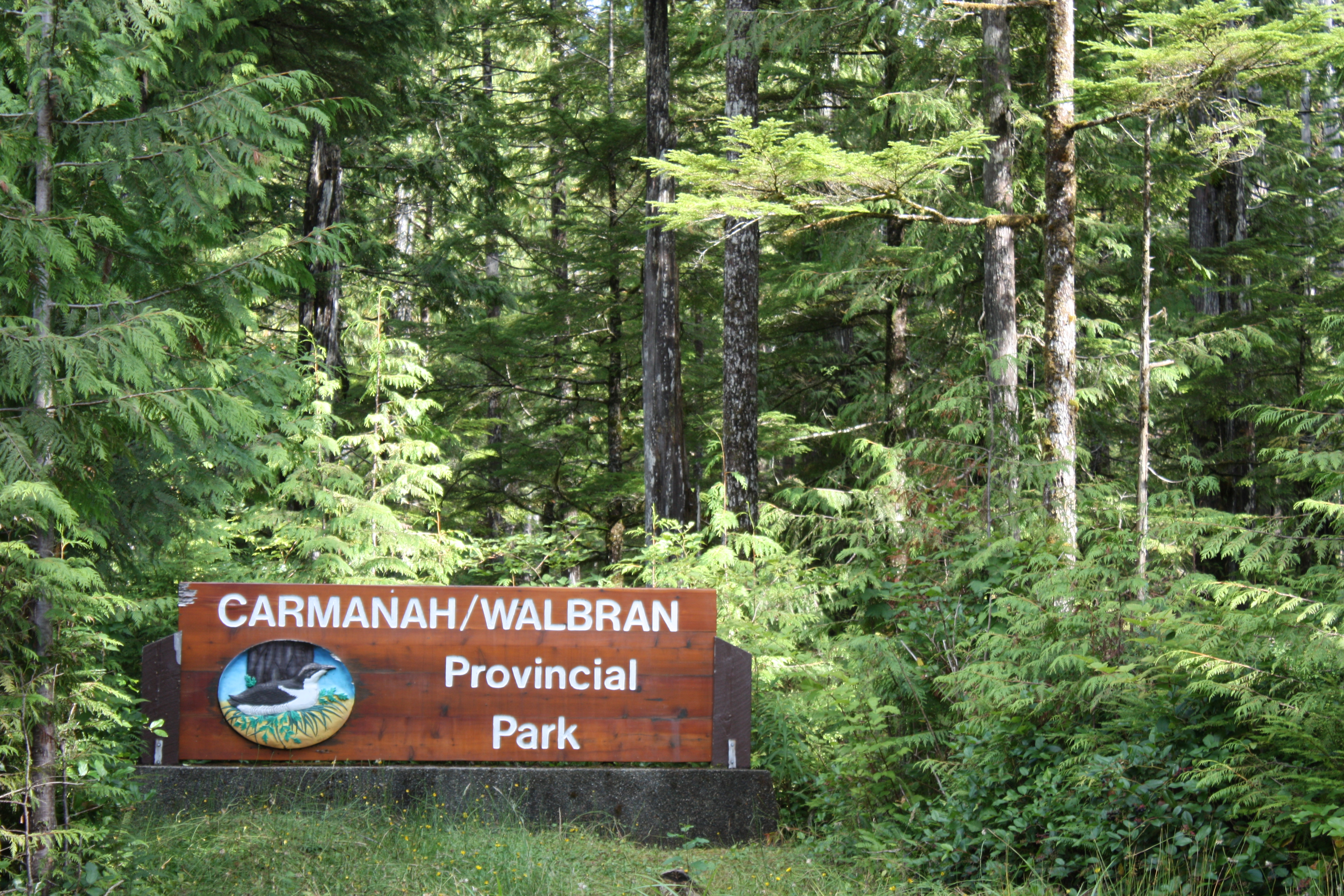
Carmanah Walbran Provincial Park, British Columbia

Province	Area	Old-growth extent	WWF ecoregion	Old-growth forest type
British Columbia	Carmanah Walbran Provincial Park	164 square kilometres (41,000 acres)	Central Pacific coastal forests	coniferous temperate rainforest
British Columbia	Clayoquot Sound	265,000 hectares (650,000 acres)	Central Pacific coastal forests	coniferous temperate rainforest
British Columbia	Great Bear Rainforest	16,000 square kilometres (4,000,000 acres)	British Columbia mainland coastal forests	coniferous temperate rainforest
Nova Scotia	North River Wilderness Area		New England-Acadian forests	Eastern Hemlock
Nova Scotia	Panuke Lake Nature Reserve	47 hectares (120 acres)	New England-Acadian forests	Eastern Hemlock, Red Spruce
Nova Scotia	Shelburne Heritage River		New England-Acadian forests	Eastern Hemlock, pine
Nova Scotia	Pollett's Cove		Eastern Canadian forests, New England-Acadian forests	boreal
Nova Scotia	French River Wilderness Area		New England-Acadian forests	Eastern Hemlock
Nova Scotia	Trout Brook Wilderness Area			deciduous
Nova Scotia	Tobeatic Wilderness Area		New England-Acadian forests	Eastern Hemlock, pine
Nova Scotia	Portapique River Wilderness Area		New England-Acadian forests	Eastern Hemlock, Red Spruce
Nova Scotia	Waverley–Salmon River Long Lake Wilderness Area		New England-Acadian forests	Eastern Hemlock, Red Pine, Eastern White Pine
Nova Scotia	Boggy Lake Wilderness Area		New England-Acadian forests	Sugar Maple, Yellow Birch, American Beech
Nova Scotia	Great Barren & Quinan Lakes Nature Reserve		New England-Acadian forests	Eastern Hemlock, Red Spruce
Nova Scotia	MacFarlane Woods Nature Reserve		New England-Acadian forests	Sugar Maple, Yellow Birch, American Beech
Nova Scotia	Bornish Hill Nature Reserve		New England-Acadian forests	hardwood
Nova Scotia	Sporting Lake Nature Reserve	25 hectares (62 acres)	New England-Acadian forests	Eastern Hemlock, White Pine, Red Spruce
Ontario	Gillies Grove, Arnprior	18 hectares (44 acres)	Eastern Great Lakes lowland forests	
Ontario	Obabika Old-Growth Forest	2,400 hectares (5,900 acres)	Eastern forest-boreal transition	
Ontario	Quetico Provincial Park	1,500 square kilometres (370,000 acres)	Western Great Lakes forests	
Ontario	White Bear Forest		Eastern forest-boreal transition	
Ontario	Wolf Lake Forest Reserve	336 hectares (830 acres)	Eastern forest-boreal transition	red pine
Quebec	Bois Beckett Forest, Sherbrooke	6 ha (15 acres)	New England-Acadian forests	hemlock, beech
Quebec	Papineau Woods, Laval,	100 ha (250 acres)		

=== United States ===
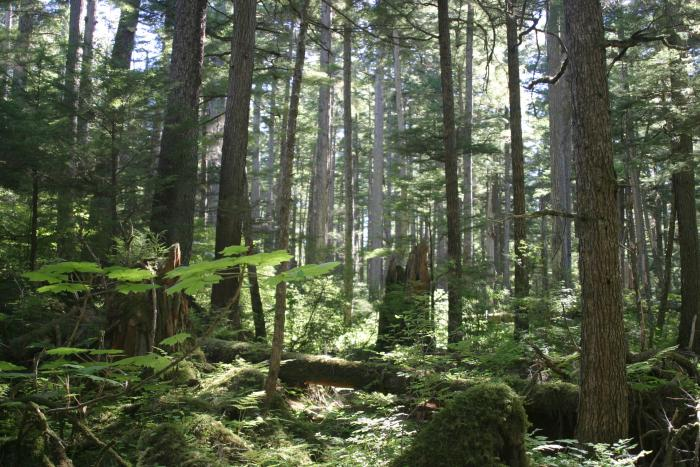
Tongass National Forest, Alaska

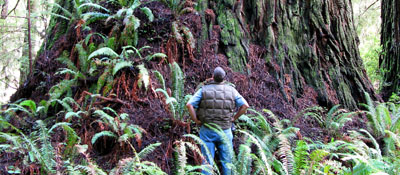
Arborist and Coast Redwood, Jedediah Smith Redwoods State Park, California

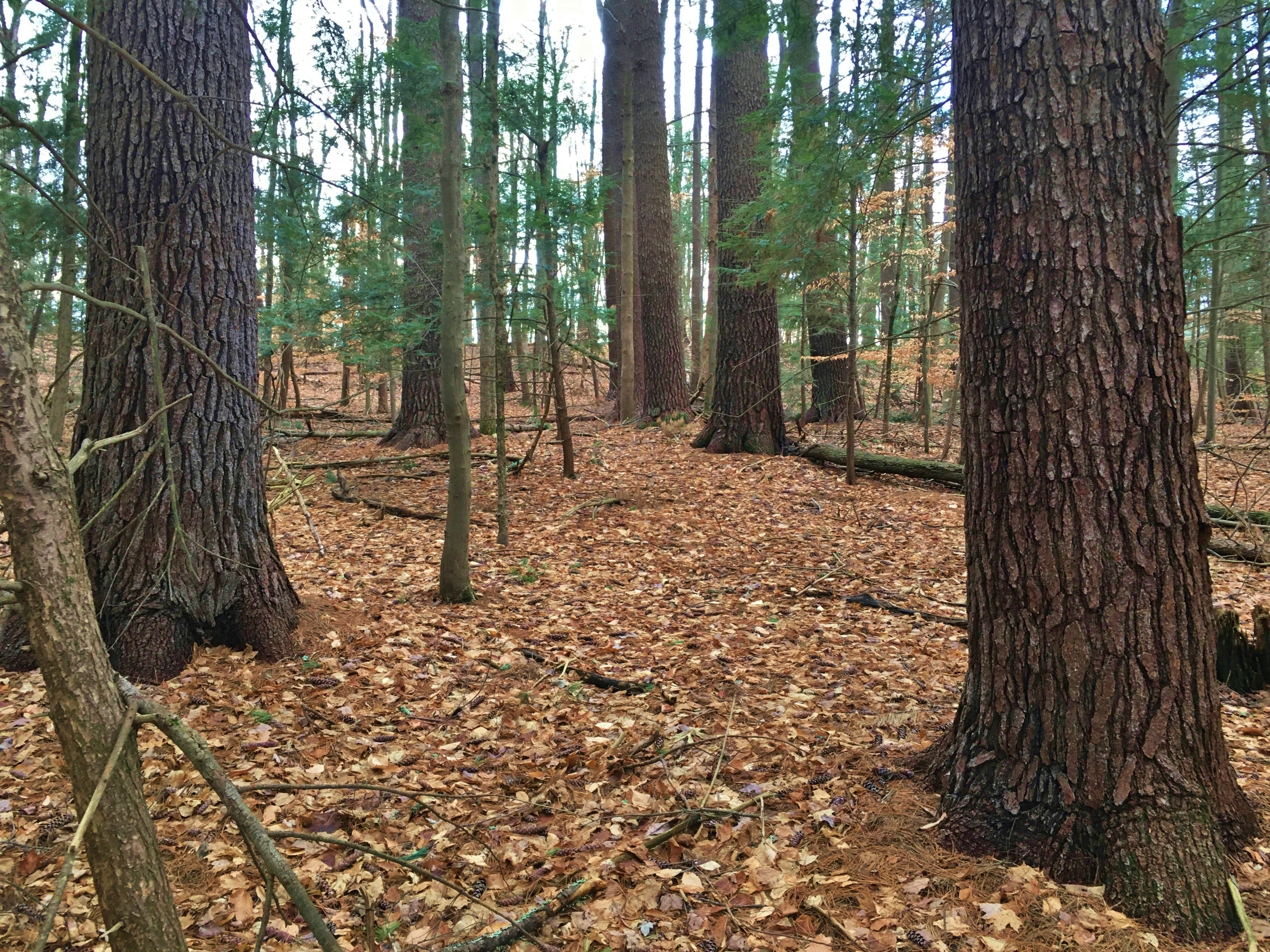
Belden Forest, Simsbury, Connecticut

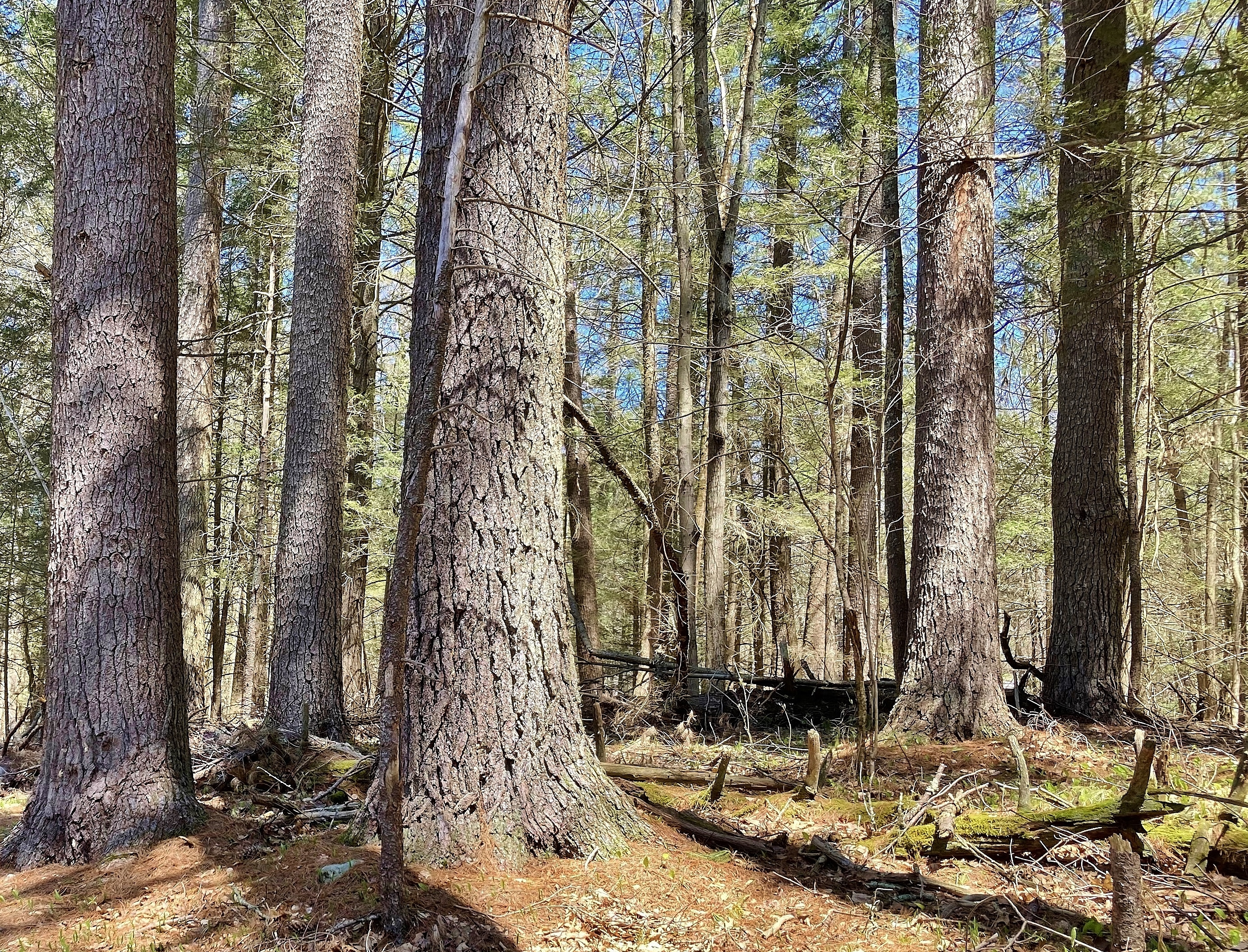
Cathedral Pines Preserve, Cornwall, Connecticut

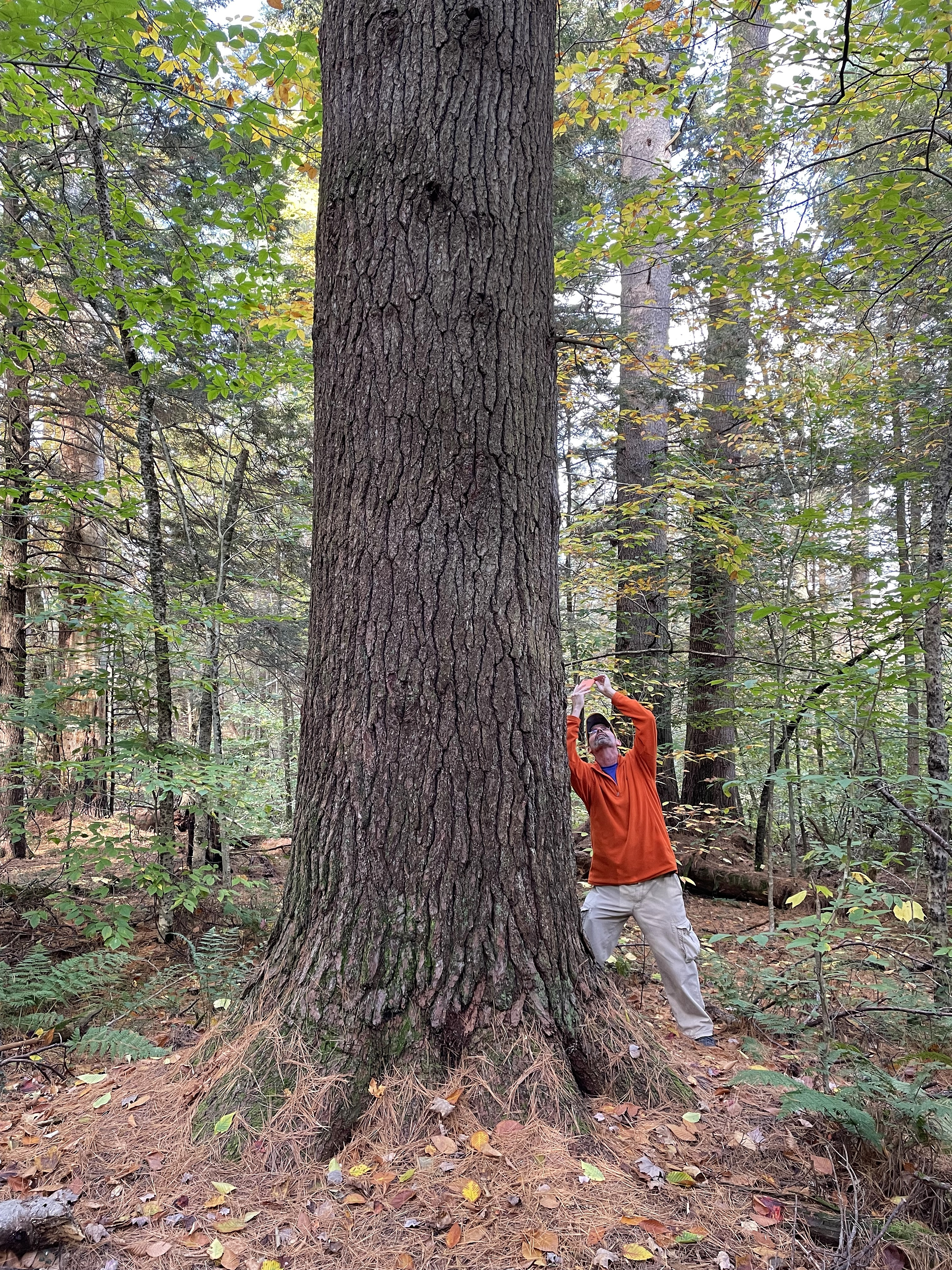
William Cullen Bryant Homestead, Cummington, Massachusetts

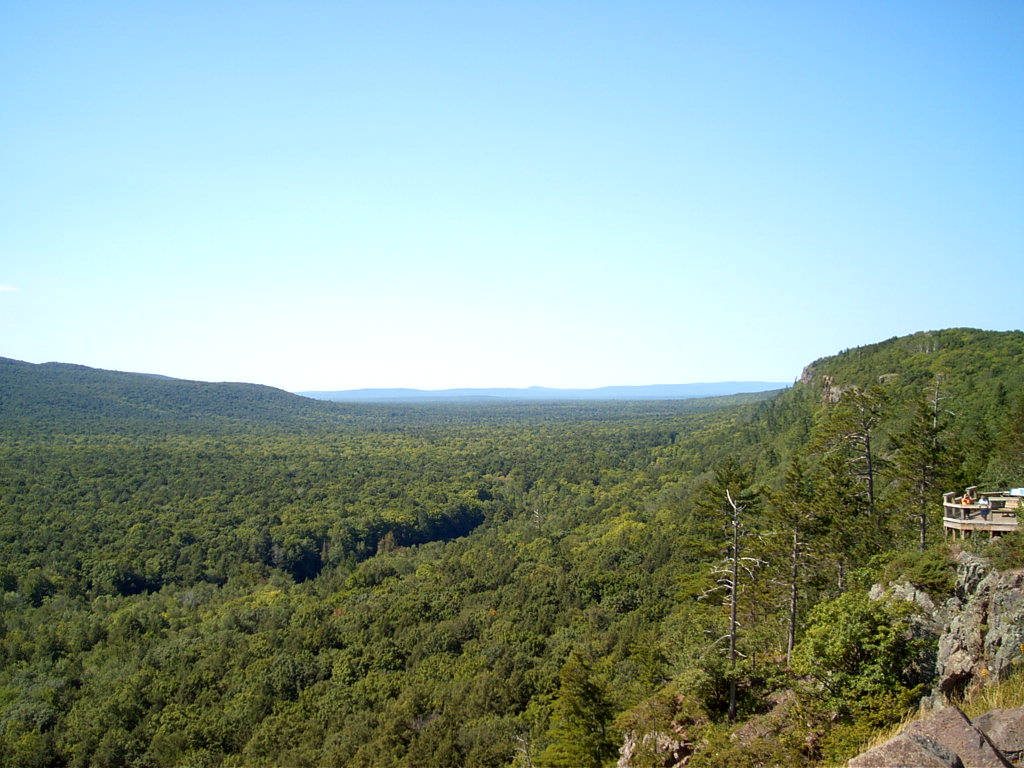
Porcupine Mountains, Michigan

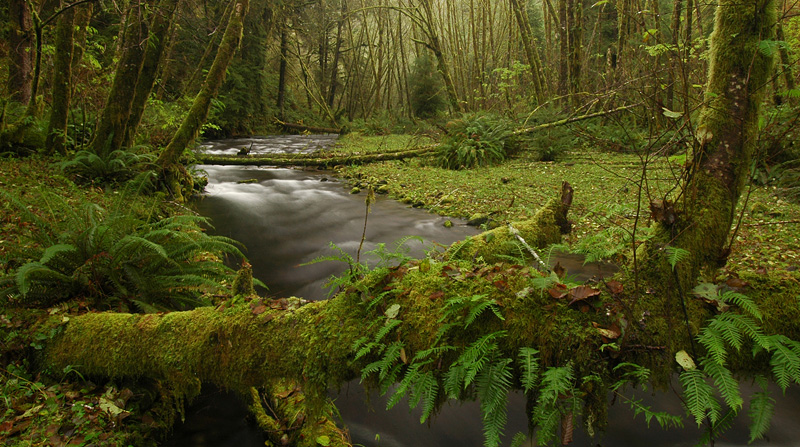
Rock Creek Wilderness, Oregon

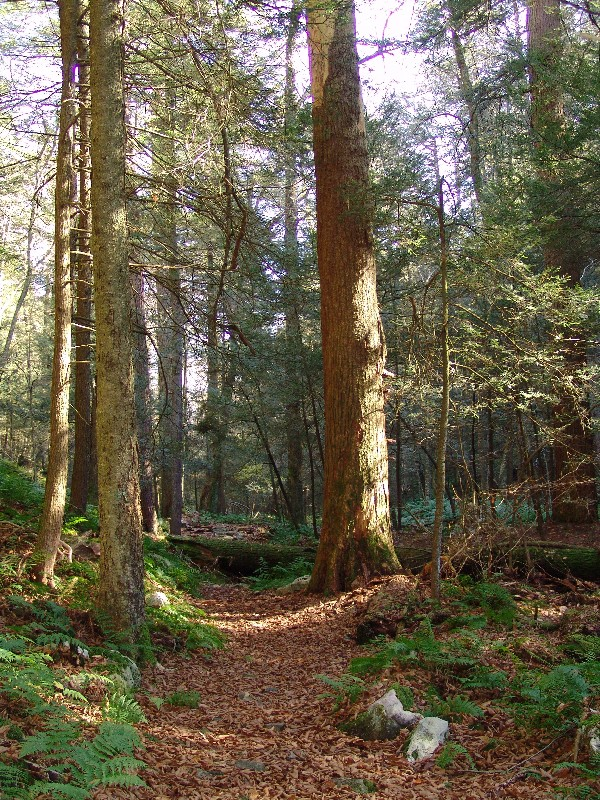
Snyder Middleswarth Natural Area, Pennsylvania

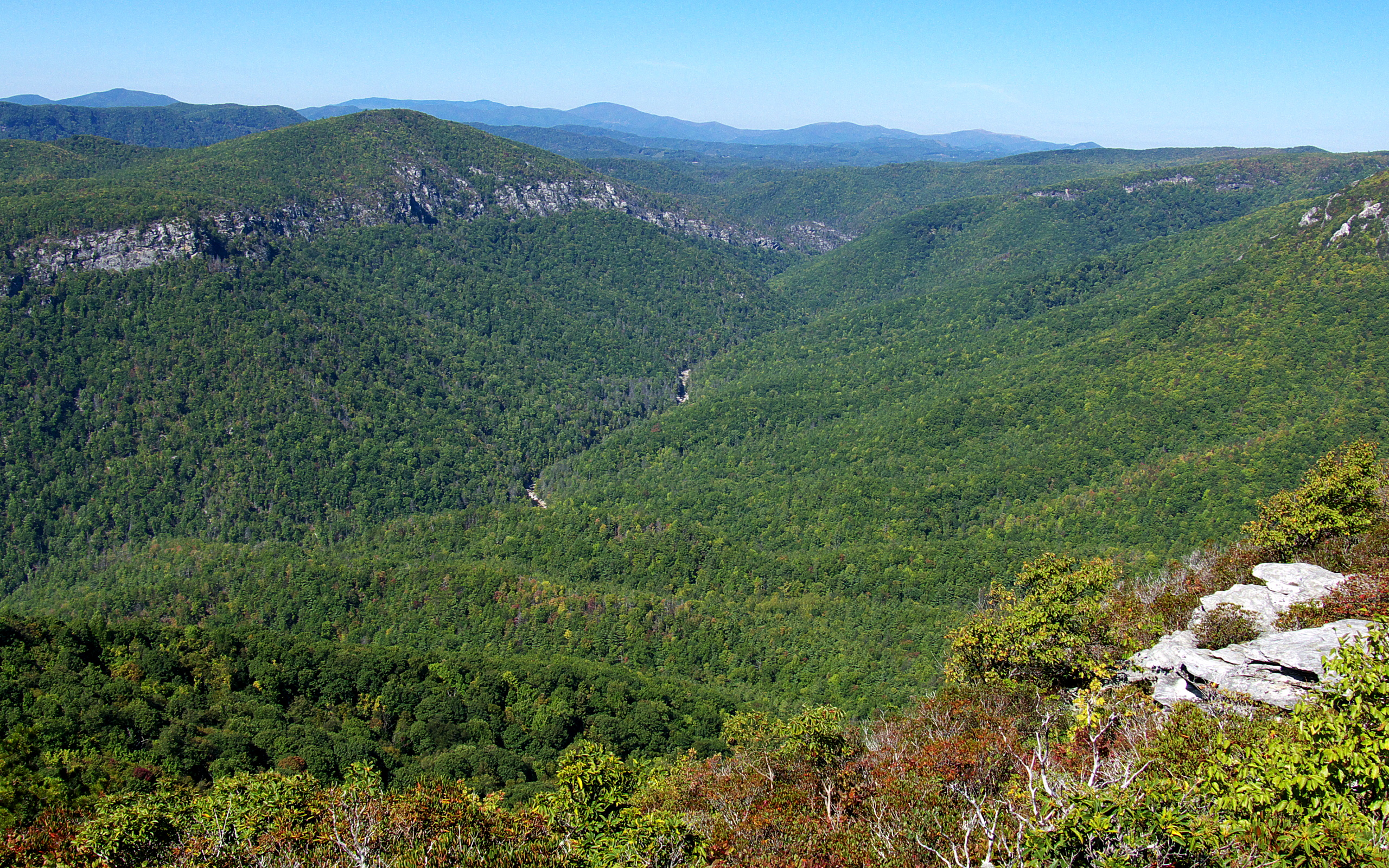
Linville Gorge Wilderness in the Pisgah National Forest, North Carolina

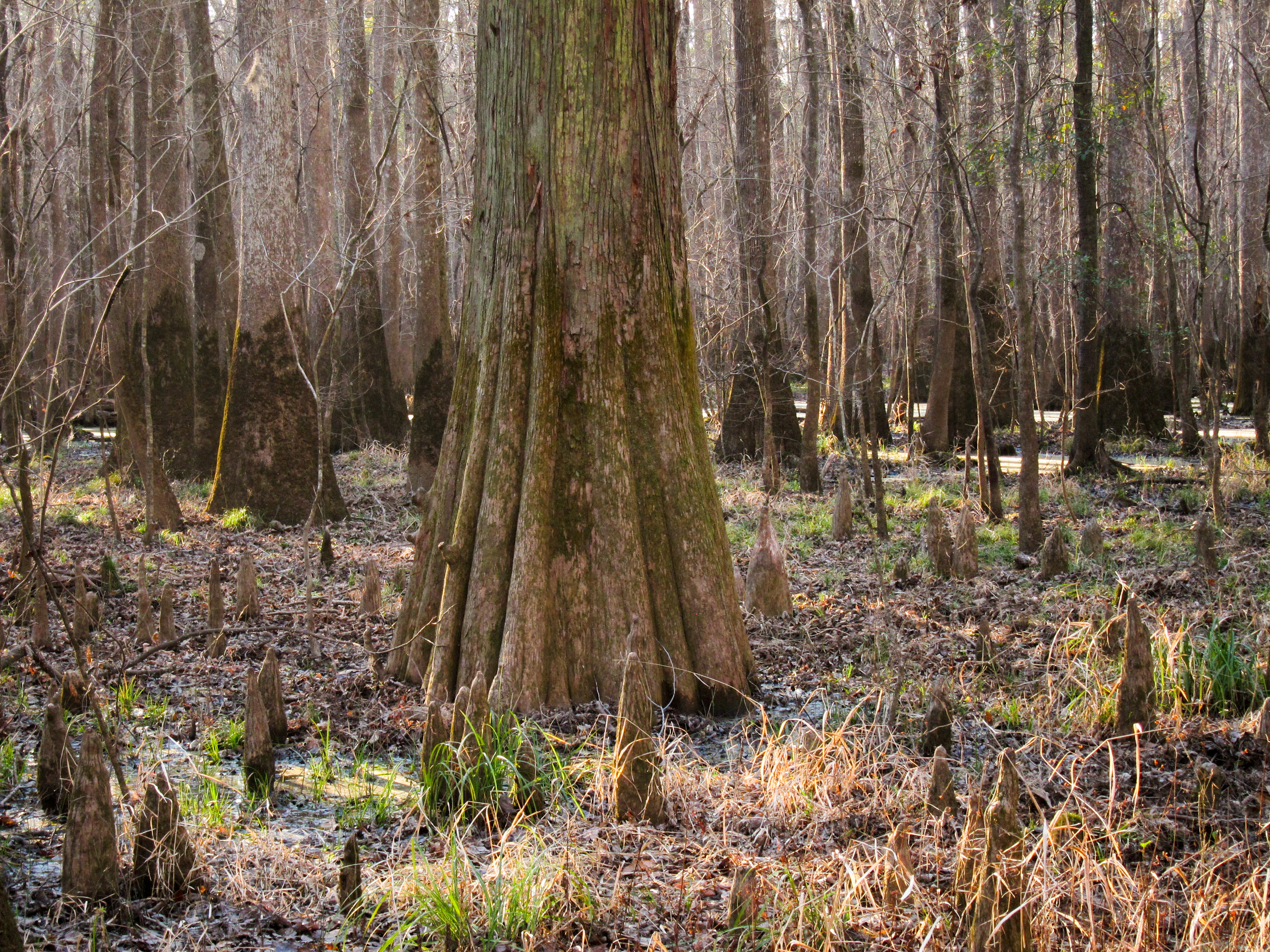
Congaree National Park, South Carolina

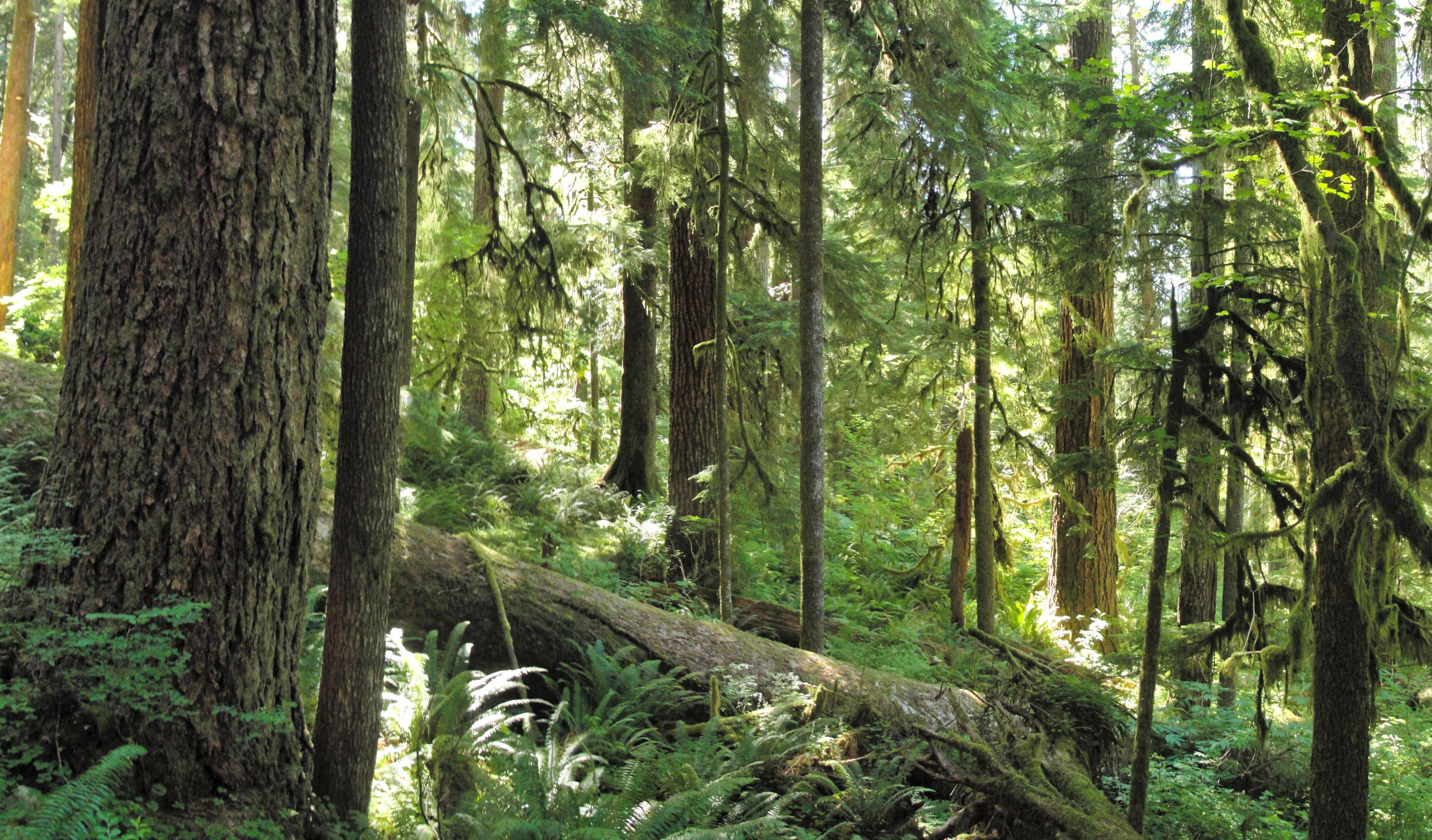
Olympic National Park, Washington

State	Area	Old-growth extent	WWF ecoregion	Old-growth forest type
Alabama	Sipsey Wilderness		Appalachian mixed mesophytic forests	Eastern Hemlock, American Beech, Sweet Birch, White Oak, Tulip Poplar
Alaska	Tongass National Forest	5,400,000 acres (2,200,000 ha)	Northern Pacific coastal forests, Pacific Coastal Mountain icefields and tundra	Western Red Cedar, Sitka Spruce, Western Hemlock
Arkansas	White River National Wildlife Refuge	973 acres (394 ha)	Mississippi lowland forests	American sweetgum, Nuttall's Oak, Willow Oak, Sugarberry, American elm, Green Ash, American Sycamore, Pecan, American elm, Baldcypress
Arkansas	Ouachita National Forest	800,000 acres (320,000 ha)		Post Oak, Shortleaf Pine, Hickory, Northern Red Oak, White Oak, Blackjack Oak, Eastern Redcedar, Gum Bumelia, Winged Elm, Yaupon
Arkansas	Ozark-St. Francis National Forest	11,000 acres (4,500 ha)		Shortleaf Pine, Post Oak, Blackjack Oak, Eastern Black Oak, White Oak, Northern Red Oak
Arkansas	Hot Springs National Park	320 acres (130 ha)		Shortleaf Pine, Blackjack Oak, White Oak
Arkansas	Overflow National Wildlife Refuge	230 acres (93 ha)		American Beech, Sugar Maple
California	Yosemite National Park	225,510 acres (91,260 ha)	Sierra Nevada forests	Giant Sequoia, Ponderosa Pine, Jeffrey Pine, Sugar Pine, White Fir, California Incense Cedar, Coast Douglas-fir, Red Fir, Western White Pine, Lodgepole Pine, Foxtail Pine
California	Sequoia-Kings Canyon National Park	202,430 acres (81,920 ha)	Sierra Nevada forests	Giant Sequoia, Ponderosa Pine, Jeffrey Pine, Sugar Pine, White Fir, Red Fir, California Incense Cedar
California	Lassen Volcanic National Park	27,130 acres (10,980 ha)	Sierra Nevada forests	Ponderosa Pine, Jeffrey Pine, Sugar Pine, White Fir, Red Fir, Western White Pine, Mountain Hemlock, Lodgepole Pine, Whitebark Pine
California	Redwood National and State Parks	38,982 acres (15,775 ha) or more	Northern California coastal forests	Coast Redwood
California	Humboldt Redwoods State Park	23,600 acres (9,600 ha)	Northern California coastal forests	Coast Redwood
California	Muir Woods National Monument	240 acres (97 ha)	California interior chaparral and woodlands	Coast Redwood
California	Samuel P. Taylor State Park	600 acres (240 ha)	California interior chaparral and woodlands	Coast Redwood
California	Big Basin Redwoods State Park	10,800 acres (4,400 ha)	Northern California coastal forests	Coast Redwood
California	Henry Cowell Redwoods State Park	200 acres (81 ha)	Northern California coastal forests	Coast Redwood, Coast Douglas-fir, Pacific Madrone, Ponderosa Pine
California	Headwaters Forest Reserve	3,088 acres (1,250 ha)	Northern California coastal forests	Coast Redwood
California	Blue oak woodlands	500,000–2,300,000 acres (200,000–930,000 ha)	California interior chaparral and woodlands	Blue Oak
California	Angeles National Forest	29,000 acres (12,000 ha)	California montane chaparral and woodlands	Jeffrey Pine, Bigcone Douglas-fir, Ponderosa Pine, White Fir, Lodgepole Pine
California	Eldorado National Forest	122,000 acres (49,000 ha)	Sierra Nevada forests	Coast Douglas-fir, Ponderosa Pine, White Fir, Lodgepole Pine, Red Fir
California	Inyo National Forest	238,000 acres (96,000 ha)	Sierra Nevada forests – Great Basin montane forests	Lodgepole Pine, Jeffrey Pine, Great Basin Bristlecone Pine
California	Klamath National Forest	168,000 acres (68,000 ha)	Klamath-Siskiyou forests	Ponderosa Pine, Jeffrey Pine, Coast Douglas-fir, Red Fir, White Fir, California Incense Cedar
California	Lassen National Forest	92,000 acres (37,000 ha)		Coast Douglas-fir, Ponderosa Pine, White Fir, Jeffrey Pine, Red Fir, Lodgepole Pine
California	Los Padres National Forest	18,900 acres (7,600 ha)		Jeffrey Pine, Coast Redwood, Coast Douglas-fir, White Fir
California	Mendocino National Forest	60,000 acres (24,000 ha)		Coast Douglas-fir, Ponderosa Pine, White Fir, Tanoak, Pacific madrone
California	Modoc National Forest	43,400 acres (17,600 ha)		Lodgepole Pine, Ponderosa Pine, White Fir, California Incense Cedar, Red Fir
California	Pfeiffer Big Sur State Park	1,006 acres (407 ha)		Redwood
California	Plumas National Forest	127,000 acres (51,000 ha)		Coast Douglas-fir, Ponderosa Pine, White Fir, Jeffrey Pine, Red Fir
California	San Bernardino National Forest	87,400 acres (35,400 ha)		Bigcone Douglas-fir, Ponderosa Pine, White Fir, Jeffrey Pine, Lodgepole Pine
California	Sequoia National Forest	196,000 acres (79,000 ha)		Giant Sequoia, Jeffrey Pine, Red Fir, Coast Douglas-fir, Ponderosa Pine, White Fir, Lodgepole Pine
California	Shasta-Trinity National Forest	230,000 acres (93,000 ha)		Coast Douglas-fir, Tanoak, Pacific madrone, Red Fir, White Fir, Jeffrey Pine
California	Sierra National Forest	383,000 acres (155,000 ha)		Lodgepole Pine, Red Fir
California	Six Rivers National Forest	137,000 acres (55,000 ha)		Coast Douglas-fir, Tanoak, Pacific madrone, White Fir
California	Stanislaus National Forest	139,000 acres (56,000 ha)		Lodgepole Pine, Jeffrey Pine, White Fir
California	Tahoe National Forest	84,000 acres (34,000 ha)		Coast Douglas-fir, Ponderosa Pine, White Fir, Sugar Pine, California Incense Cedar, California Black Oak, Lodgepole Pine, Red Fir
Colorado	Arapaho National Forest	2,590 hectares (6,400 acres)		Subalpine Fir, Engelmann Spruce
Connecticut	Cathedral Pines, Cornwall	42 acres (17 ha)		White Pine, Hemlock
Connecticut	Sages Ravine, Salisbury	100 acres (40 ha)		Hemlock, Oak
Connecticut	Great Mountain Forest, Norfolk—North Forty Tract	40 acres (16 ha)		Hemlock, Hardwoods, White Pine
Connecticut	Great Mountain Forest, Norfolk—Bigelow Pond Site	5 acres (2.0 ha)		Hemlock
Connecticut	Mount Riga Incorporated, Salisbury	8 acres (3.2 ha)		White Pine, Eastern Hemlock, Yellow Birch, American Beech
Connecticut	Bear Mountain, Salisbury	5 acres (2.0 ha)		Sweet Birch, Pitch Pine
Connecticut	Belden Forest, Simsbury	40 acres (16 ha)		Eastern White Pine
Florida	Eglin Air Force Base	6,795 acres (2,750 ha)		longleaf pine
Florida	Apalachicola National Forest		Southeastern conifer forests	Pondcypress, slash pine
Florida	Big Cypress National Preserve	23,000 acres (9,300 ha)	South Florida rocklands, Everglades	slash pine
Florida	Big Cypress National Preserve	158,000 acres (64,000 ha)	South Florida rocklands, Everglades	pondcypress
Florida	Tosohatchee Wildlife Management Area	1,000 acres (400 ha)		Floodplain swamp
Florida	Tosohatchee Wildlife Management Area	40 acres (16 ha)		Mesic flatwoods
Florida	Tosohatchee Wildlife Management Area	Unknown, up to 1000 acres		Hydric hammock
Georgia	Chattahoochee National Forest	346 acres (140 ha)	Appalachian-Blue Ridge forests	River floodplain hardwood, Dry-mesic oak forest, Seasonally wet oak-hardwood woodland
Georgia	Fernbank Forest	65 acres (26 ha)	Piedmont Hardwood Forest	Tulip Poplar – Oak – Hickory
Georgia	Big Trees Forest Preserve	30 acres (12 ha)	Piedmont Hardwood Forest	oak-hickory-pine forest
Illinois	Shawnee National Forest	2,800 acres (1,100 ha)		post oak – blackjack oak
Illinois	Cache River State Natural Area	1,600 acres (650 ha)	Central U.S. hardwood forests	
Illinois	Cypress Creek National Wildlife Refuge	500 acres (200 ha)	Central U.S. hardwood forests	
Illinois	Beall Woods State Park	329 acres (133 ha)	Central U.S. hardwood forests	
Indiana	Hoosier National Forest	390 acres (160 ha)	Central U.S. hardwood forests	Post Oak
Indiana	Douglas Woods	400 acres (160 ha)	Southern Great Lakes forests	Silver Maple, Oak, Hickory
Indiana	Wesselman Woods	200 acres (81 ha)	Central U.S. hardwood forests	Sugar Maple, Tulip Tree, Oak
Indiana	Pioneer Mothers Memorial Forest	88 acres (36 ha)	Central U.S. hardwood forests	Oak
Indiana	Ginn Woods	161 acres (65 ha)	Southern Great Lakes forests	
Indiana	Meltzer Woods	48 acres (19 ha)	Southern Great Lakes forests	Bur oak, Black ash, Swamp white oak, Beech, Maples
Indiana	Bicentennial Woods	79 acres (32 ha)	Southern Great Lakes forests	Oaks, Maples, Sycamores, Sassafras, Slippery elm and Flowering dogwood
Kansas	Fort Leavenworth	1,000 acres (400 ha)	Central forest-grasslands transition	Eastern floodplain
Kentucky	Blanton Forest	2,239 acres (906 ha)		
Kentucky	Lilley Cornett Woods	252 acres (102 ha)		
Maine	Baxter State Park	23,094 acres (9,346 ha)		Balsam Fir
Maine	Mahoosuc Mountains Ecological Reserve	2,444 acres (989 ha)		Balsam Fir
Maine	Bigelow Mountain Ecological Reserve	3,100 acres (1,300 ha)		Balsam Fir
Maine	Big Reed Forest Preserve	5,000 acres (2,000 ha) or less		northern hardwoods, spruce-fir, rich woods, and cedar swamps
Maryland	Belt Woods	43 acres (17 ha)		white oak – tulip poplar
Maryland	Swallow Falls State Park ("Hemlock Grove")	39 acres (16 ha)	Appalachian mixed mesophytic forests	eastern hemlock – white pine
Maryland	Potomac-Garrett State Forest ("Crabtree Woods")	500 acres (200 ha)	Appalachian mixed mesophytic forests	sugar maple – red oak – basswood – cucumber tree
Massachusetts	Mohawk Trail State Forest	612 acres (248 ha)	New England-Acadian forests	northern hardwood
Massachusetts	Ice Glen		New England-Acadian forests	northern hardwood
Massachusetts	Monroe State Forest	273 acres (110 ha)	New England-Acadian forests	northern hardwood
Massachusetts	Mount Everett State Reservation	530 acres (210 ha)	New England-Acadian forests	northern hardwood
Massachusetts	Mount Greylock	555 acres (225 ha)	New England-Acadian forests	northern hardwood
Massachusetts	Mount Wachusett	220 acres (89 ha)	New England-Acadian forests	northern hardwood
Massachusetts	Mount Washington State Forest	300 acres (120 ha)	New England-Acadian forests	northern hardwood
Massachusetts	William Cullen Bryant Homestead	109 acres (44 ha)	New England-Acadian forests	Eastern White Pine, Black Cherry, Sugar Maple
Michigan	Hartwick Pines State Park	49 acres (20 ha)	Western Great Lakes forests	Eastern White Pine, Red Pine, Eastern Hemlock, Beech, Sugar Maple
Michigan	Porcupine Mountains	31,000 acres (13,000 ha)	Western Great Lakes forests	northern hardwood
Michigan	Sylvania Wilderness	15,000 acres (6,100 ha)	Western Great Lakes forests	northern hardwood
Michigan	Warren Woods	200 acres (81 ha)	Southern Great Lakes forests	Beech-Maple forest
Minnesota	Boundary Waters	401,000 acres (162,000 ha)	Western Great Lakes forests	white pine, red pine, fir/birch, jack pine – black spruce, maple, aspen
Minnesota	Keeley Creek Natural Area	900 acres (360 ha)	Western Great Lakes forests	bog and upland
Minnesota	Itasca State Park	4,094 acres (1,657 ha)	Western Great Lakes forests	Eastern White Pine, Red Pine
Missouri	Mark Twain National Forest	30,000 acres (12,000 ha) or less	Central U.S. hardwood forests	Post Oak and Chinkapin Oak savanna and flatwoods
Missouri	Caney Mountain	4,000 acres (1,600 ha) or more	Central U.S. hardwood forests	post oak savanna
New Hampshire	Great Gulf			New England-Acadian forests
New Hampshire	Crawford Notch			New England-Acadian forests
New Hampshire	The Bowl Research Natural Area	510 acres (210 ha)	New England-Acadian forests	Red Spruce, Balsam fir, Beech, Yellow birch, Sugar maple, Paper birch
New Hampshire	Hemenway State Forest	135 acres (55 ha)	New England-Acadian forests	Eastern White Pine
New Hampshire	The Bowl Research Natural Area	510 acres (210 ha)	New England-Acadian forests	Red Spruce, Balsam fir, Beech, Yellow birch, Sugar maple, Paper birch
New Jersey	Saddler's Woods	25 acres (10 ha)	Northeastern coastal forests	Eastern Black Oak, White Oak, Northern Red Oak, American Beech, Tulip Poplar, Red Maple
New Jersey	Bear Swamp	215 acres (87 ha)	Atlantic coastal pine barrens	Black Gum, American sweetgum, Red Maple, Sweetbay Magnolia, American Beech, Swamp White Oak, American Holly
New Jersey	William L. Hutcheson Memorial Forest	65 acres (26 ha)	Northeastern coastal forests	White Oak, Eastern Black Oak, Northern Red Oak
New Jersey	Tillman Ravine	25 acres (10 ha)	Allegheny Highlands forests	Eastern Hemlock
New Jersey	Clayton Park	78 acres (32 ha)	Northeastern coastal forests	American Beech, White Oak, Northern Red Oak, Gray birch
New York	Catskill Mountains	60,000 acres (24,000 ha) or more	Allegheny Highlands forests	
New York	Adirondack Mountains	150,000 acres (61,000 ha) or more	Eastern forest-boreal transition	
New York	Thain Family Forest	50 acres (20 ha) or more	Northern hardwood forest	
New York	Mianus River Gorge Preserve	60 - 100 acres (24 - 40.5 ha)	Appalachian hemlock–northern hardwood forest	Eastern hemlock-beech forest
North Carolina	Great Smoky Mountains	187,000 acres (76,000 ha)	Appalachian-Blue Ridge forests	
North Carolina	Nantahala National Forest	30,800 acres (12,500 ha)	Appalachian-Blue Ridge forests	
North Carolina	Pisgah National Forest	46,600 acres (18,900 ha)	Appalachian-Blue Ridge forests	
North Carolina	Croatan National Forest	10,000 acres (4,000 ha)	Middle Atlantic coastal forests	pocosin
Ohio	Goll Woods State Nature Preserve	140 acres (57 ha)	Southern Great Lakes forests	
Ohio	Fowler Woods State Nature Preserve	50 acres (20 ha)	Southern Great Lakes forests	
Ohio	Crall Woods National Natural Landmark	40 acres (16 ha)	Southern Great Lakes forests	
Ohio	Dysart Woods	57 acres (23 ha)	Appalachian mixed mesophytic forests	
Ohio	Hawk Woods in Riddle State Nature Preserve	106 acres (43 ha)	Appalachian mixed mesophytic forests	
Ohio	Morgan Sisters Woods in Wayne National Forest	200 acres (81 ha)	Appalachian mixed mesophytic forests	
Ohio	California Woods Nature Preserve	40 acres (16 ha)	Southern Great Lakes forests, Central U.S. hardwood forests	
Ohio	Caldwell Park (Cincinnati)	122 acres (49 ha) or less	Southern Great Lakes forests, Central U.S. hardwood forests	
Ohio	Hueston Woods State Nature Preserve	165–200 acres (67–81 ha)	Southern Great Lakes forests	
Ohio	Davey Woods State Nature Preserve	15–40 acres (6.1–16.2 ha)	Southern Great Lakes forests	
Ohio	Gross (Samuel) Memorial Woods State Nature Preserve	49 acres (20 ha)	Southern Great Lakes forests	
Ohio	Johnson Woods State Nature Preserve	206 acres (83 ha)	Southern Great Lakes forests	
Oklahoma	Keystone Ancient Forest Preserve	1,300 acres (530 ha)	Central forest-grasslands transition zone	Post Oak, Blackjack Oak, Eastern Redcedar
Oregon	Crater Lake National Park	50,000 acres (20,000 ha)		
Oregon	Deschutes National Forest	348,100 acres (140,900 ha)		
Oregon	Malheur National Forest	312,000 acres (126,000 ha)		
Oregon	Mount Hood National Forest	345,300 acres (139,700 ha)		Coast Douglas-fir, Western Hemlock, Western Red Cedar
Oregon	Ochoco National Forest	95,000 acres (38,000 ha)		
Oregon	Rogue River-Siskiyou National Forest	345,300 acres (139,700 ha)	Klamath-Siskiyou forests	Coast Douglas-fir, Port Orford Cedar, Ponderosa Pine, Sugar Pine, Coast Douglas-fir, California Incense Cedar, White Fir, Red Fir, Mountain Hemlock
Oregon	Siuslaw National Forest	33,800 acres (13,700 ha) (1993 estimate)	Central Pacific coastal forests	
Oregon	Umatilla National Forest	190,741 acres (77,190 ha) (1993 estimate)		
Oregon	Umpqua National Forest	535,300 acres (216,600 ha) (1993 estimate)		Mountain Hemlock, Ponderosa Pine
Oregon	Wallowa-Whitman National Forest	173,000 acres (70,000 ha) (1993 estimate)		
Oregon	Willamette National Forest	594,800 acres (240,700 ha)		Coast Douglas-fir, Western Hemlock, Western Red Cedar, Bigleaf Maple
Oregon	Winema National Forest	711,674 acres (288,004 ha)		
Oregon	Fremont National Forest	549,800 acres (222,500 ha)		
Oregon	Emigrant Springs State Heritage Area		Blue Mountains forests	
Pennsylvania	Cook Forest State Park	1,500–2,000 acres (610–810 ha)	Allegheny Highlands forests	Eastern White Pine, Eastern Hemlock, Northern Red Oak, White Oak, Black Cherry, Red Maple, Sugar Maple, American Beech, White Ash, Yellow Birch, Black Birch, Cucumber Magnolia
Pennsylvania	Alan Seeger Natural Area	390 acres (160 ha)	Appalachian-Blue Ridge forests	Eastern White Pine, Eastern Hemlock
Pennsylvania	Bear Meadows Natural Area	320 acres (130 ha)	Appalachian-Blue Ridge forests	Black Spruce, Balsam Fir bog
Pennsylvania	Detweiler Run Natural Area	185 acres (75 ha)	Appalachian-Blue Ridge forests	Eastern White Pine, Eastern Hemlock
Pennsylvania	Thickhead Mountain Wild Area	50 acres (20 ha)	Appalachian-Blue Ridge forests	Chestnut Oak
Pennsylvania	Woodbourne Forest and Wildlife Preserve	120 acres (49 ha)	Allegheny Highlands forests	Eastern Hemlock, Sweet Birch, Sugar Maple, Northern Red Oak, White Ash, American Beech
Pennsylvania	Holtwood Environmental Preserve	200 acres (81 ha)	Northeastern coastal forests	Chestnut Oak, Eastern Hemlock, Umbrella Magnolia
Pennsylvania	Anders Run Natural Area	50 acres (20 ha)	Allegheny Highlands forests	Eastern White Pine, Eastern Hemlock, Cucumber Magnolia, American Beech, American Hornbeam, Black Cherry, oak
Pennsylvania	Sweet Root Natural Area	69 acres (28 ha)	Appalachian-Blue Ridge forests	Eastern Hemlock, Sweet Birch, Eastern White Pine, American Basswood, White Oak, Red Oak
Pennsylvania	Hearts Content Recreation Area	122 acres (49 ha)	Allegheny Highlands forests	Eastern White Pine, Eastern Hemlock, American Beech
Pennsylvania	Tionesta Scenic and Research Natural Areas	4,000 acres (1,600 ha)	Allegheny Highlands forests	Eastern Hemlock, American Beech, Sugar Maple
Pennsylvania	Allegheny Islands Wilderness	156 acres (63 ha)	Allegheny Highlands forests	Silver Maple, Sugar Maple, American Sycamore, Slippery Elm
Pennsylvania	Bark Cabin Natural Area	73 acres (30 ha)	Allegheny Highlands forests	Eastern Hemlock, Northern Red Oak, White Ash, Bigtooth Aspen, Hickories
Pennsylvania	Johnson Run Natural Area	26–50 acres (11–20 ha)	Allegheny Highlands forests	Eastern Hemlock, Eastern White Pine
Pennsylvania	Forrest H. Duttlinger Natural Area	158 acres (64 ha)	Allegheny Highlands forests	Eastern Hemlock, American Beech, Black Cherry, Sugar Maple
Pennsylvania	Pinchot State Forest, Montage Mountain	1,200 acres (490 ha)	Appalachian-Blue Ridge forests	Eastern Hemlock, American Beech, Black Cherry, Yellow Birch, Red Oak, White Oak, Chestnut Oak, Ash, Tulip Poplar, Red Maple
Pennsylvania	Snyder Middleswarth Natural Area	250 acres (100 ha)	Appalachian-Blue Ridge forests	Eastern Hemlock, Eastern White Pine, Pitch Pine
Pennsylvania	Hemlocks Natural Area	120 acres (49 ha)	Appalachian-Blue Ridge forests	Eastern Hemlock
Pennsylvania	Ricketts Glen State Park	2,000 acres (810 ha)	Allegheny Highlands forests	Northern Hardwood Forest
Pennsylvania	Peck Natural Area in Lake Winola	10–20 acres (4.0–8.1 ha)	Allegheny Highlands forests	Northern Hardwood Forest, Eastern White Pine, American Beech
Rhode Island	Great Swamp Wildlife Management Area	3,000 acres (1,200 ha)	Northeastern coastal forests	Red Maple, Atlantic White Cedar, Black Gum
Rhode Island	Lawton's Valley Forest		Northeastern coastal forests	Sugar Maple, White Ash, American Beech, Yellow Birch, Northern Red Oak
Rhode Island	Oakland Forest	20 acres (8.1 ha)	Northeastern coastal forests	American Beech, White Oak, Red Maple, Scarlet Oak
Rhode Island	Pawcatuck River floodplain forest	250 acres (100 ha)	Northeastern coastal forests	Red Maple floodplain
South Carolina	Congaree National Park	11,000 acres (4,500 ha)	Middle Atlantic coastal forests	bottomland hardwood forest
South Carolina	Francis Beidler Forest	1,700 acres (690 ha)	Middle Atlantic coastal forests	mixed hardwoods and cypress-tupelo swamp
South Carolina	Ellicott Rock Wilderness	1,000 acres (400 ha) or more	Appalachian-Blue Ridge forests	
Tennessee	Great Smoky Mountains	187,000 acres (76,000 ha)	Appalachian-Blue Ridge forests	
Tennessee	Forest within Nashville	225 acres (91 ha)	Central U.S. hardwood forests	Black Walnut, White Oak, American Sycamore, Persimmon, Pawpaw
Tennessee	Old Forest Arboretum of Overton Park	172 acres (70 ha)		
Utah	Red Canyon-Dixie National Forest	255 acres (103 ha)	Wasatch and Uinta montane forest	Ponderosa Pine, Douglas Fir, Pinyon-juniper woodland
Virginia	George Washington and Jefferson National Forests	230,000 acres (93,000 ha)	Appalachian-Blue Ridge forests	
Virginia	Caledon Natural Area	300 acres (120 ha)	Southeastern mixed forests	Upland White Oak – Tulip Poplar
Virginia	Warm Springs Mountain	425 acres (172 ha)	Appalachian-Blue Ridge forests	Oak-Hickory, Pitch Pine
Virginia	North Landing River Preserve	200 acres (81 ha)	Middle Atlantic coastal forests	Pond Pine, Atlantic White Cedar and scattered ancient Bald cypress
Virginia	James Madison Estate	200 acres (81 ha)	Southeastern mixed forests	Northern Red Oak, White Oak, Tulip Tree and Hickory
Washington	Olympic National Park	366,000 acres (148,000 ha)		
Washington	North Cascades National Park	236,000 acres (96,000 ha)		
Washington	Mount Rainier National Park	91,000 acres (37,000 ha)		
Washington	Colville National Forest	212,488 acres (85,991 ha)		
Washington	Gifford Pinchot National Forest	198,000 acres (80,000 ha)		
Washington	Mount Baker-Snoqualmie National Forest	643,500 acres (260,400 ha)		
Washington	Okanogan–Wenatchee National Forest	316,000 acres (128,000 ha)		
Washington	Olympic National Forest	266,800 acres (108,000 ha)		
Washington	Moran State Park	5,000 acres (2,000 ha)		Coast Douglas-fir
Washington	Rockport State Park (Washington)	632 acres (256 ha)		Coast Douglas-fir
Washington	Federation Forest State Park	619 acres (251 ha)		Coast Douglas-fir, Sitka Spruce
Washington	South Whidbey State Park	381 acres (154 ha)		Coast Douglas-fir, Sitka spruce, Western Hemlock and Western Red-cedar
Washington	Seward Park (Seattle)	300 acres (120 ha)		Coast Douglas-fir
Washington	Point Defiance Park	400 acres (160 ha)		Coast Douglas-fir, Western Redcedar, Western Hemlock, Bigleaf Maple, Pacific Madrone
Washington	West Hylebos Wetlands Park	120 acres (49 ha)		Sitka Spruce, Bigleaf Maple, Black Cottonwood, Coast Douglas-fir, Western Redcedar
Washington	Schmitz Preserve Park	53 acres (21 ha)		
West Virginia	Cathedral State Park	132 acres (53 ha)		Eastern Hemlock
West Virginia	Monongahela National Forest	318 acres (129 ha) in 6 separate stands		
Wisconsin	Apostle Islands National Lakeshore	1,500 acres (610 ha)		
Wisconsin	Chequamegon-Nicolet National Forest			
Wisconsin	Gerstberger Pines	20 acres (8.1 ha)		Eastern Hemlock, Yellow Birch, Red Oak, White Pine, Basswood, Red Maple
Wisconsin	Namekagon Barrens	4,000 acres (1,600 ha)		Jack pine and scrub oak
Wyoming	Yellowstone National Park			Lodgepole Pine

=== Central America ===
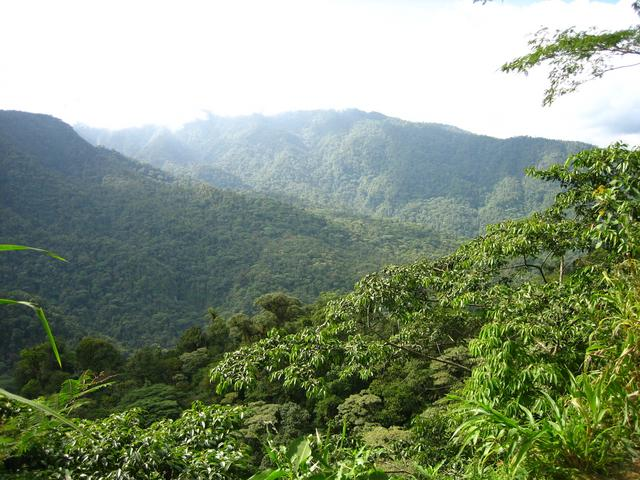
Braulio Carrillo National Park, Costa Rica

Country	Area	Old-growth extent	WWF ecoregion	Old-growth forest type
Costa Rica	Braulio Carrillo National Park	428 square kilometres (165 sq mi)	Talamancan montane and Isthmian–Atlantic moist forests	
Panama	Chagres National Park	428 square kilometres (165 sq mi)		coastal tropical

=== Caribbean ===
Country	Area	Old-growth extent	WWF ecoregion	Old-growth forest type
The Bahamas	Primeval Forest National Park	7.5 acres	Bahamian dry forests	evergreen tropical hardwood
Puerto Rico (United States)	El Toro Wilderness, El Yunque National Forest	13,700 acres	Puerto Rican moist forests	Ternstroemia luquillensis and Dacryodes excelsa mature forests.

== South America ==
Country	Area	Old-growth extent	WWF ecoregion	Old-growth forest type
French Guiana (France)	Lucifer Dékou-Dékou Biological Reserve	64,373 hectares (159,070 acres)	Tropical and subtropical moist broadleaf forests	Tropical rainforest

== See also ==
- List of oldest trees
- Old-Growth Forest Network
