= Woodbourne Forest and Wildlife Preserve =

Protected area in Pennsylvania, US

Coordinates: 41.761°N 75.898°W

The Woodbourne Forest and Wildlife Preserve is a protected area that is managed by The Nature Conservancy. It covers 648 acres (262 ha) in northeastern Pennsylvania in the United States.

It is located just south of Montrose, Pennsylvania.

== History and notable features ==
This nature preserve contains old fields, meadows, creeks, bogs, and forests that are home to a wide variety of animals. These include more than 180 species of birds, such as pileated woodpeckers, great horned owls and winter wrens.

The preserve's wetlands harbor frogs, snakes and nine species of salamander, including the spring salamander, northern two-lined salamander and four-toed salamander.

The preserve's forests, which are part of the Allegheny Highlands forests ecoregion, contain 120 acres (49 ha) of old growth northern hardwood forest with eastern hemlock, sweet birch, sugar maple, northern red oak, white ash, and American beech trees.

Visitor activities include hiking, snowshoeing, cross-country skiing, birdwatching, and photography.
