= Saddler's Woods =

Forest in Haddon Township, Camden County, New Jersey

Coordinates: 39.901°N 75.058°W

Saddler's Woods is a 25 acres (10 ha) forest in Haddon Township, Camden County, New Jersey that includes the headwater spring of Newton Creek. Despite its location just 5 miles (8.0 km) from Philadelphia, Saddler's Woods includes wetlands, young woodlands, and old-growth forest.

The Arowmen and Erinwonek tribes of the Lenape people once lived in the area. Beginning in the 17th century, the surrounding forests were cleared for farms, timber, and fuel by European settlers. The woods are named for a nineteenth-century owner, Joshua Saddler, who in 1868 he wrote in his will that none of his heirs "shall cut the timber thereon."

When threatened by development, part of the Woods was purchased by the Township in 1999. The remaining area was protected by a conservation easement in 2003. The Saddler's Woods Conservation Association currently works to restore and maintain the Woods.

Tree species in the Woods include Eastern Black Oak, White Oak, Northern Red Oak, American Beech, Tulip Poplar, and Red Maple. Some trees measure 13 feet (4.0 m) in diameter and are 300 years old. There are American Chestnut and Spicebush in the understory.

== See also ==
- List of old growth forests
