= Johnson Run Natural Area =

Nature reserve in Cameron County, Pennsylvania, U.S.

- IUCN category V (protected landscape/seascape)
- Location within Pennsylvania
- Location: Cameron County, Pennsylvania
- Nearest city: Driftwood
- Coordinates: 41.3590°N 78.1191°W
- Area: 216 acres (87 ha)
- Website: www.dcnr.state.pa.us/FORESTRY/oldgrowth/johnsonrun.aspx

Johnson Run Natural Area is a 216-acre (87 ha) nature preserve located in Cameron County, Pennsylvania. The topography consists of a rugged, bouldered plateau dissected by steep-sided streams and covered with somewhere from 26 acres (11 ha) to 50 acres (20 ha) of old-growth forest containing Eastern Hemlock and Eastern White Pine. Some of the white pines are nearly 4 feet (120 cm) in diameter at breast height.

== See also ==
- List of old growth forests
