= Allegheny Highlands forests =

Temperate broadleaf and mixed forests ecoregion of the United States

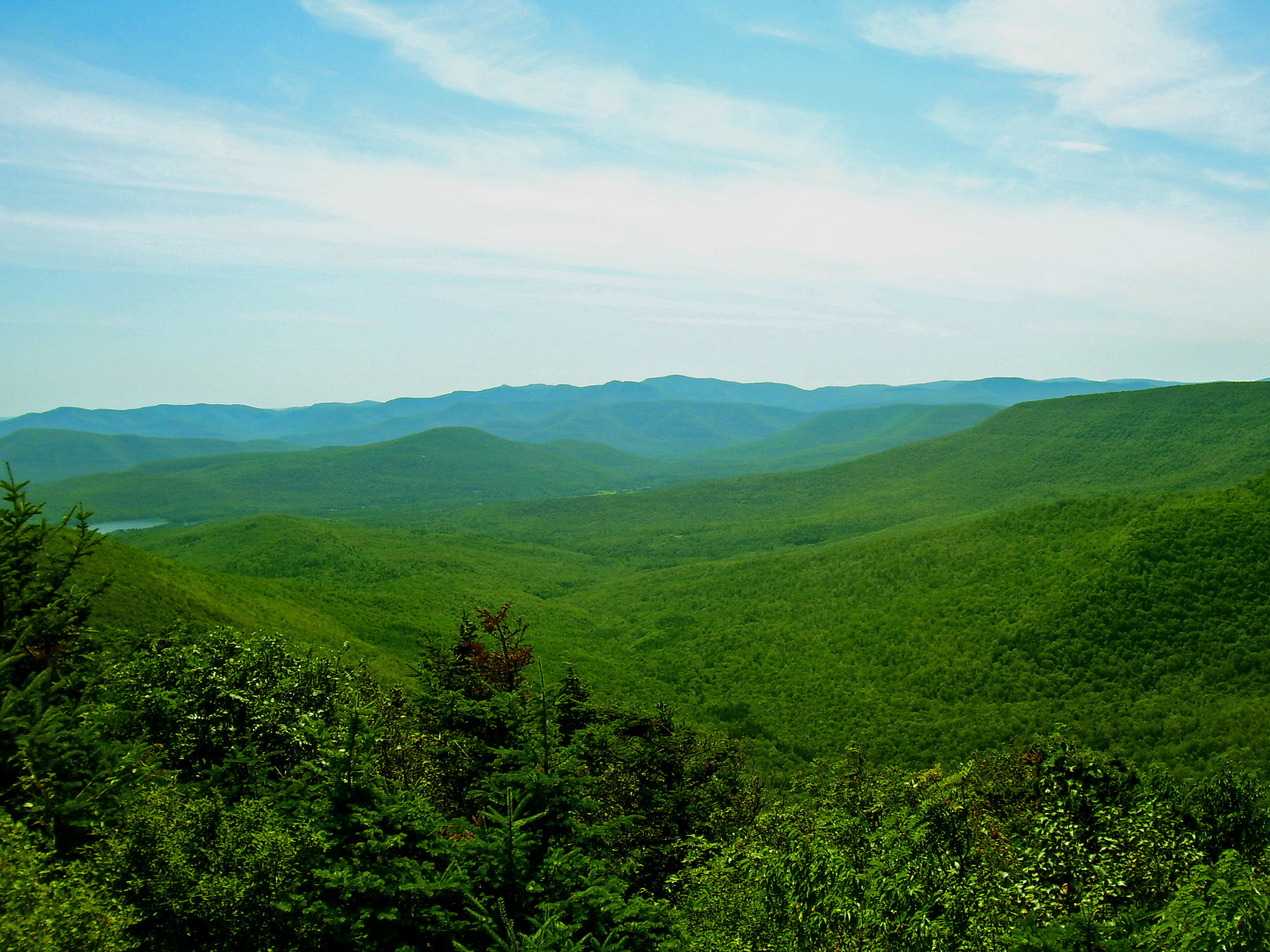
- Slide Mountain and surrounding peaks in the Catskill Mountains

- Allegheny Highlands Forests highlighted in green

Ecology
- Realm: Nearctic
- Biome: Temperate broadleaf and mixed forests
- Borders: List: Southern Great Lakes forests; Appalachian mixed mesophytic forests; Northeastern coastal forests; Appalachian-Blue Ridge forests; Eastern Great Lakes lowland forests
- Bird species: 198
- Mammal species: 58

Geography
- Area: 116,400 km^{2} (44,900 mi^{2})
- Country: United States
- States: Pennsylvania; New York; Ohio
- Climate type: Humid continental (Dfb)

Conservation
- Habitat loss: 23.3%
- Protected: 16.9%

The Allegheny Highlands forests are a temperate broadleaf and mixed forests ecoregion located in a large part of the Allegheny Plateau physiographic province, including both unglaciated and glaciated portions, in Pennsylvania and New York within North America, as defined by the World Wildlife Fund. The United States EPA defines the area as belonging to the Northern Central Appalachians and Northern Appalachian Plateau and Uplands ecoregions.

== Setting ==
The ecoregion consists of four separate blocks of mixed forest surrounded by lower lying areas of hardwood forest as follows: the Northern Allegheny Plateau in New York State and Pennsylvania including the Catskill Mountains, the Poconos, the Finger Lakes and French Creek areas. The geology is diverse, with Paleozoic shales, sandstones, limestones, and chert. The topography is generally hilly with some deeply cut river valleys and many waterfalls. Areas of the north and central Appalachians; the western Allegheny Plateau in western Pennsylvania and Ohio; and the upland plain around Lake Erie and Lake Ontario. The Finger Lakes overlap the Eastern Great Lakes Lowland Forests ecoregion to the north. These lakes were created by glaciers, which scoured, widened, and deepened existing river valleys. Glacial debris then dammed rivers and created the lakes.

== Climate ==
The North Central Appalachians ecoregion has a severe mid-latitude humid continental climate, marked by warm summers and snowy, cold winters. The mean annual temperature ranges from roughly 3 °C to 8 °C with an average of 1082 mm annual precipitation. The Northern Appalachian Plateau and Highlands ecoregion, also a severe mid-latitude humid continental climate, has a mean annual temperature of 7 °C, seeing an average of 969 mm of precipitation.

== Flora ==
Most of this forest was cleared in the late-19th and early-20th centuries. Although all individual trees species still remain, their quantities and distribution are radically different from the forest's original state. The pre-settlement forests were predominantly hemlock (Tsuga), white pine, and northern hardwoods forests. Most of these stands were dominated by eastern hemlock and beech. The Finger Lakes area has a particularly rich mixture of woodland, while the pinewoods in the Pocono Mountains are a unique habitat.

Upland hardwood forests include red maple (Acer rubrum), American beech (Fagus grandifolia), black cherry (Prunus serotina), and black birch (Betula lenta).

Allegheny hardwood forests consist of black cherry (Prunus serotina), white ash (Fraxinus americana), and tulip poplar (Liriodendron tulipifera).

Mixed-oak forests of northern red oak (Quercus rubra), white oak (Quercus alba), eastern black oak (Quercus velutina), and scarlet oak (Quercus coccinea) grow along major river drainages and on steep, drier slopes.

Northern hardwood forests include sugar maple (Acer saccharum) and American beech (Fagus grandifolia). Also common are yellow birch (Betula alleghaniensis), eastern hemlock (Tsuga canadensis), red maple, black cherry, and eastern white pine (Pinus strobus). Hemlock tends to follow stream drainages, while white pine prefers drier ridgetops. White ash, American elm (Ulmus americana), basswood (Tilia americana), and hop hornbeam (Ostrya virginiana) can occur locally.

Boreal forests occur at high elevations, particularly on the peaks of the Catskill Mountains. These forests include balsam fir (Abies balsamea), paper birch (Betula papyrifera), mountain ash (Sorbus americana), and red cherry (Prunus pensylvanica). Wild raisin (Viburnum cassinoides) and mountain holly (Ilex mucronata) are shrubs that grow in high elevation swamps, bogs, and ledge tops.

== Animals ==
Wildlife of the forest includes a wide variety of animals, reptiles, fish and birds. Bobcats, which are known to live in a wide variety of habitats, including boreal coniferous and mixed forests in the north like the Allegheny Highland forest. The American black bear is common throughout the Pacific Northwest's forests and mountains. They are also found in forests throughout Canada, Alaska, the Rocky Mountains, the upper Midwest, parts of the southern U.S., the Appalachian Mountains, and down into Mexico. Red foxes prefer areas where different habitats—forests, fields, orchards and brush lands—blend together. Gray foxes also prefer a landscape mosaic, but will thrive in dense northern hardwood and mixed forests where they often inhabit thickets and swamps. Coyotes can be found in a variety of habitats including fields, plains, and bushy areas.

Porcupines are native to the coniferous and mixed-forest habitats of Canada, the northeastern and western regions of the United States and northern Mexico. Beavers and river otters are known to live in ponds, lakes, rivers, marshes, streams and adjacent wetland areas and groundhogs are most commonly found along forest edges, meadows, open fields, roads and streams. They sometimes also live in dense forests. The snowshoe hare lives in dense woodlands and forest bogs. Elk inhabit a wide range of habitats, from open areas such as marshy meadows, grasslands, river flats, and aspen parkland, to coniferous forests, brushy clear cuts, or forest edges, and semi-desert areas. The preferred habitat for the Allegheny woodrat is rocky areas in deciduous forests.

White-tailed deer are highly adaptable species and thrive in a variety of habitats. The areas that provide the most suitable environment include a mixture of hardwoods, croplands, brush lands and pasturelands. The striped skunk live in wooded areas, deserts and plains, and have even adapted to urban and suburban environments. The big brown bat is found in virtually every American habitat ranging from timberline meadows to lowland deserts, though it is most abundant in deciduous forest areas. Chipmunk inhabit various forest types, from timberline slopes and rock-bordered alpine meadows downward through coniferous and deciduous forests to dry scrublands and sagebrush deserts.

The snapping turtle is found in a wide variety of aquatic habitats, preferably with slow-moving water and a soft muddy or sandy bottom. They inhabit almost any permanent or semi-permanent body of water, including marshes, creeks, swamps, bogs, pools, lakes, streams, rivers, and impoundment sand. Lastly, the timber rattlesnake lives in a variety of habitats, including mountainous or hilly forests, hardwood or pine forests, swamps and river floodplains, lowland cane thickets, and agricultural fields.

== Threats and Preservation ==
The Allegheny Highlands Forests ecoregion has been damaged by logging, agriculture, and exotic species, among other threats. Most of the ecoregion was cleared by loggers between 1890 and 1920. As well as logging and clearance for farmland another factor that affects the make-up of the forest is grazing, especially by deer, while suburban and tourist development is resulting in more habitat loss in the Catskills and the Finger Lakes especially. Agriculture, especially in the western and central lowlands of the ecoregion, has been a major source of habitat loss. Protected areas include Allegheny National Forest, Sproul State Forest, Susquehannock State Forest, Cook Forest State Park, Hammersley Wild Area, and Woodbourne Forest and Wildlife Preserve in Pennsylvania, and Allegany State Park, Catskill Park, Bergen-Byron Swamp and the shores of Hemlock Lake and Canadice Lakes in New York.

== See also ==
- List of ecoregions in the United States (WWF)
- List of ecoregions in the United States (EPA)
