= Mantaritza Biosphere Reserve =

Biosphere reserve in Bulgaria

- IUCN category Ia (strict nature reserve)
- Location within Bulgaria
- Location: Municipality of Rakitovo, Pazardzhik Province, Bulgaria
- Nearest city: Rakitovo
- Coordinates: 41°58′0″N 24°2′0″E
- Area: 10.68 km^{2} (4.12 sq mi)
- Established: 1968
- Governing body: Ministry of Environment and Water (Bulgaria), Regional Inspectorate of Environment and Water

Mantaritza Biosphere Reserve (Bulgarian: Биосферен резерват "Мантарица") is situated to the north of Golyama Syutka Peak in the Rhodope Mountains in Bulgaria, and covers an area of 1319,9 hectares. The reserve was established in 1968 to protect the old coniferous forests and the biotopes of the Western capercaillie (Tetrao urogalus). The area was declared as biosphere reserve in 1977. It represents century-old forests of pure and mixed stands of Norway spruce (Picea abies), European birch (Fagus sylvatica) and European silver fir (Abies alba). The reserve is situated in the Bulgarian Floristic sub-region of West Rhodope within the Central European mountain biotic province. The varied fauna includes brown bear (Ursus arctos), red deer (Cervus elaphus), roe deer (Capreolus capreolus), wild boar (Sus scrofa), pine marten (Martes martes), European badger (Meles meles), hazel grouse (Bonasa bonasia), black woodpecker (Dryocopus martius) and crested tit (Parus cristatus).

This area has been little affected by man. Before the biosphere reserve was designated in 1977, small-scale selective cutting took place and water reservoirs were constructed. This biosphere reserve is currently under revision.

== Sources ==
This article incorporates text from a free content work (license statement/permission). Text taken from UNESCO - MAB Biosphere Reserves Directory, UNESCO, UNESCO.
