= Belden Forest =

Old-growth forest in Connecticut

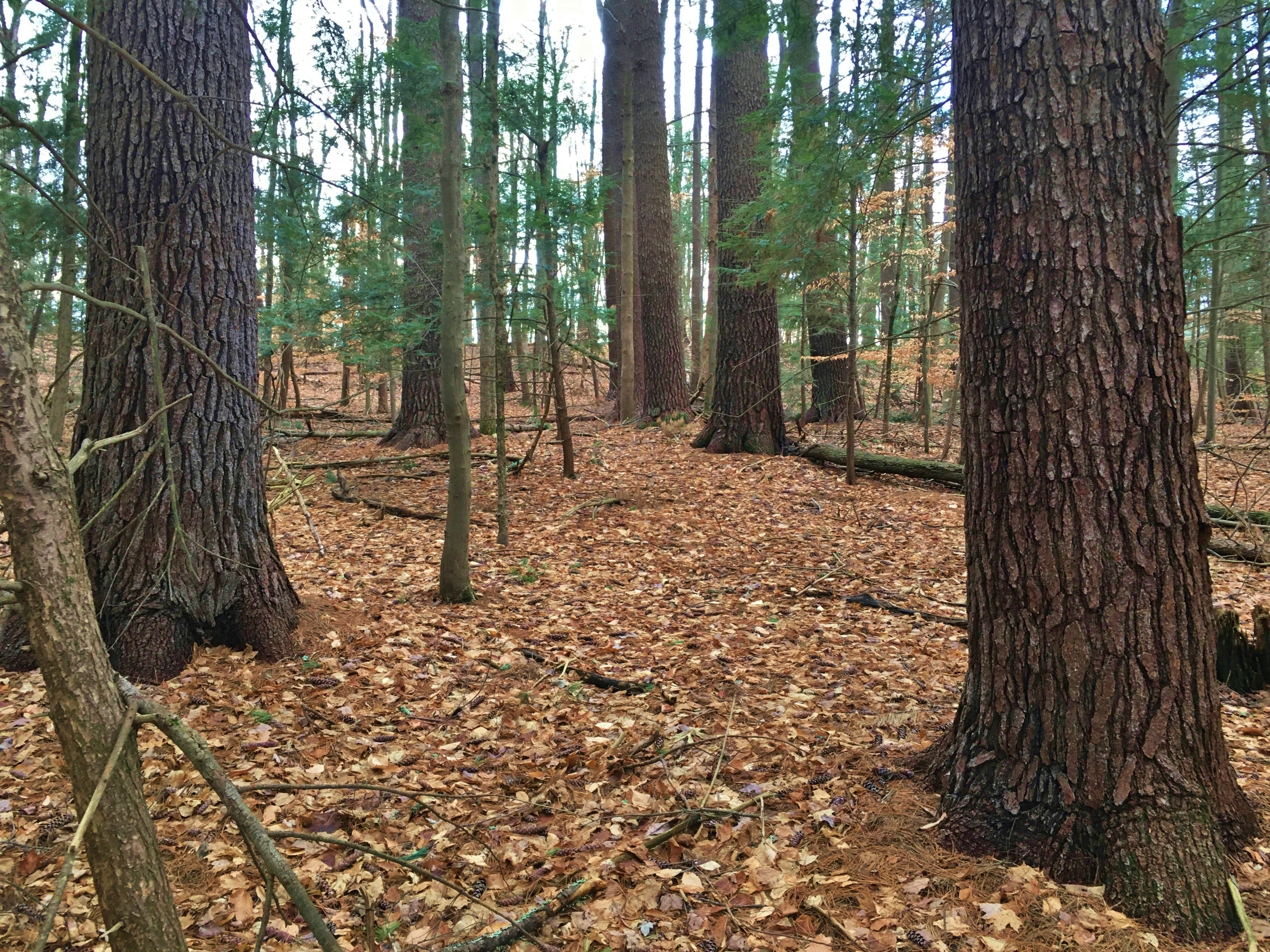
- Belden Forest in 2021

- Location within Connecticut
- Location: Simsbury, Connecticut
- Coordinates: 41.871640°N 72.804106°W
- Area: 40 acres (16 ha)

Belden Forest is a 40-acre (16 ha) wooded area owned by the Town of Simsbury, which was inducted into the Old-Growth Forest Network in October 2019. The trails are open to the public.

The property was previously part of the summer residence and estate of Amos R. Eno, and was acquired by the Town of Simsbury in 1946. The forest includes a large stand of old eastern white pines; many of which are over 100 feet tall. It also has beech trees, eastern hemlocks, oaks, maples and birch trees. All of the trees in the forest are permanently protected from commercial logging.
