= Blanton Forest =

Forest in Kentucky, United States

Blanton Forest State Nature Preserve
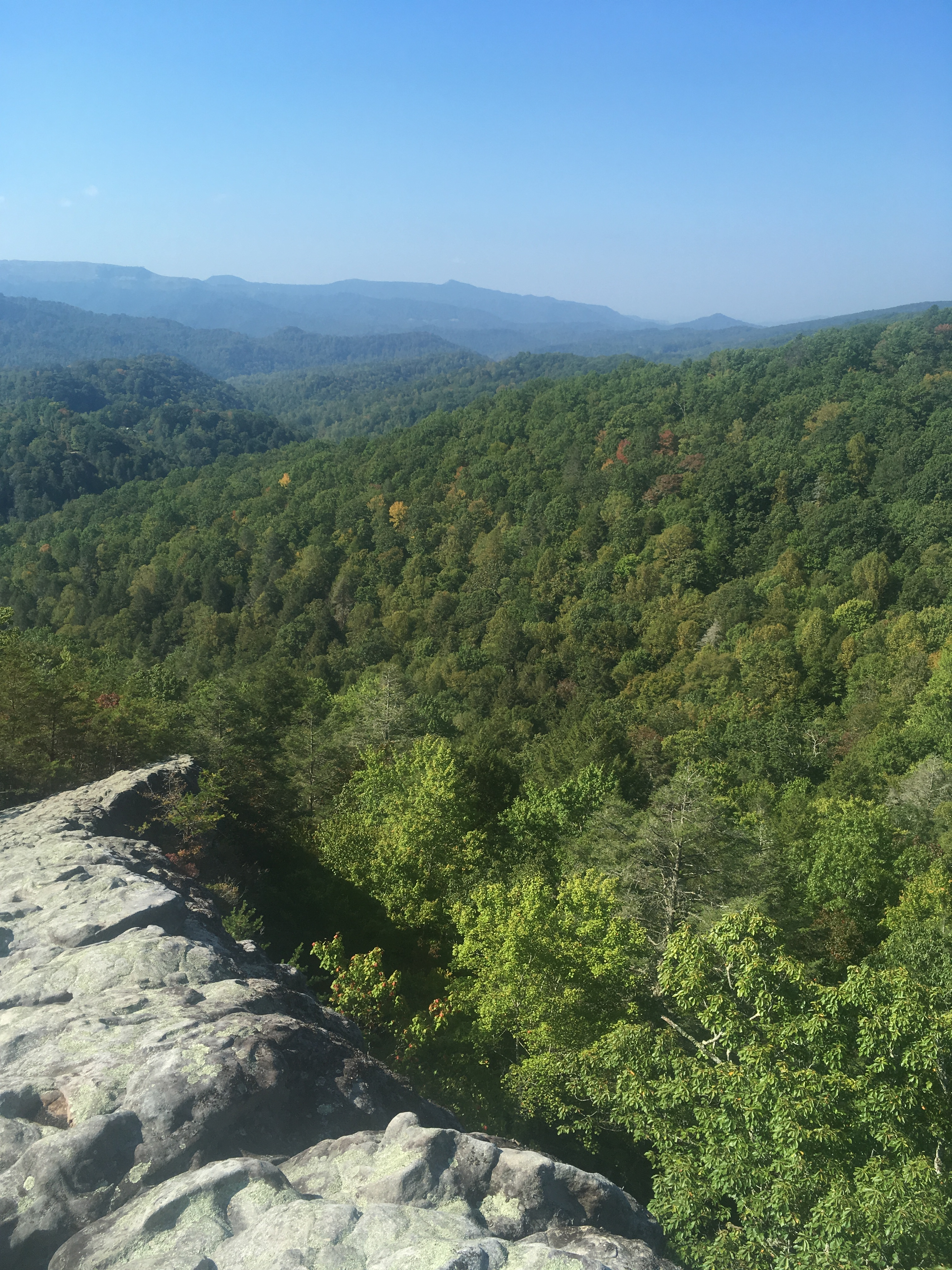
- Interactive map of Blanton Forest State Nature Preserve
- Location: Harlan County, Kentucky, United States
- Coordinates: 36°51′33″N 83°22′56″W
- Area: 3,510 acres (1,420 ha)
- Established: 1995
- Website: knlt.org/blanton/

Blanton Forest is a nature preserve and old-growth forest in the U.S. state of Kentucky, located in the Appalachian Mountains and protecting 3,510 acres of forest, including 2,200 acres that have never been logged. The dominant plant community is the Appalachian mixed mesophytic forest.

== History ==
Blanton Forest was purchased in 1928 by Grover and Oxie Blanton, for whom the forest is named, and was inherited by their daughters with the understanding that the forest would be protected from logging. In 1995 the Kentucky Natural Lands Trust formed to continue the Blanton family's legacy by protect the old-growth forest, which is the largest in the state of Kentucky and one of only 13 large tracts of old-growth forest remaining in the eastern USA.

In 2016 the forest was recognized as part of the Old-Growth Forest Network.
