= Cathedral Pines =

Nature preserve in Cornwall, Connecticut

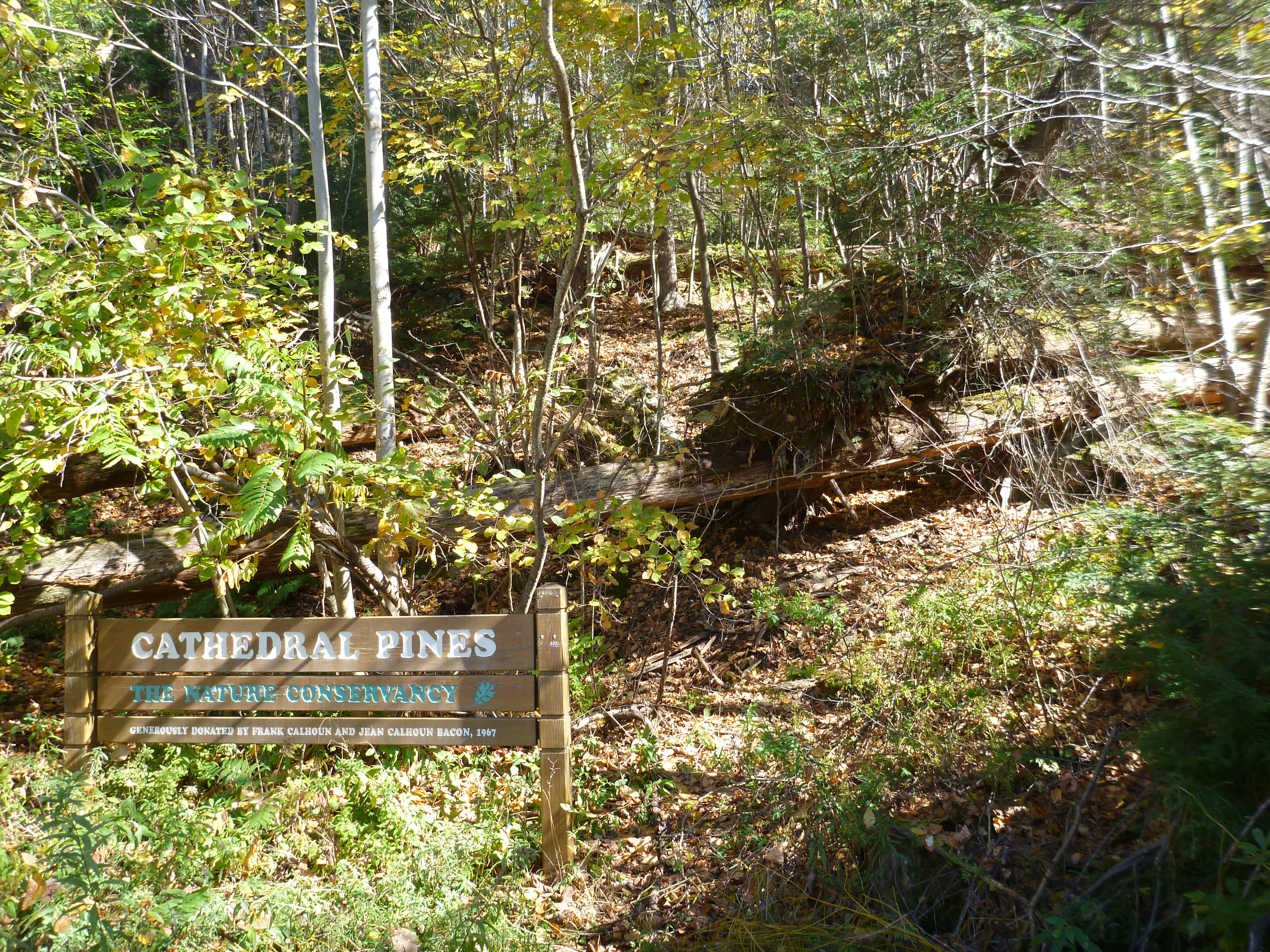
- Cathedral Pines in 2012

- Location within Connecticut
- Location: Cornwall, Connecticut
- Coordinates: 41.83604°N 73.32516°W
- Area: 42 acres (17 ha)
- Established: 1967

U.S. National Natural Landmark
- Designated: 1982

Cathedral Pines is a 42-acre (17 ha) nature preserve owned and managed by The Nature Conservancy in Cornwall, Connecticut. It is an old-growth white pine and hemlock forest which had been donated in 1967 by the Calhoun family who had purchased it in 1883 to prevent logging. It was mostly destroyed by tornadoes in July 1989 and has become a study site for ecological restoration. It was designated a National Natural Landmark in 1982.

The remaining white pines are approximately 120 feet (37 m) to 140 feet (43 m) high. It is open to the public.

In his book Second Nature, writer Michael Pollan uses the aftermath of the 1989 tornado damage at Cathedral Pines as a case for discussion of environmental ethics.

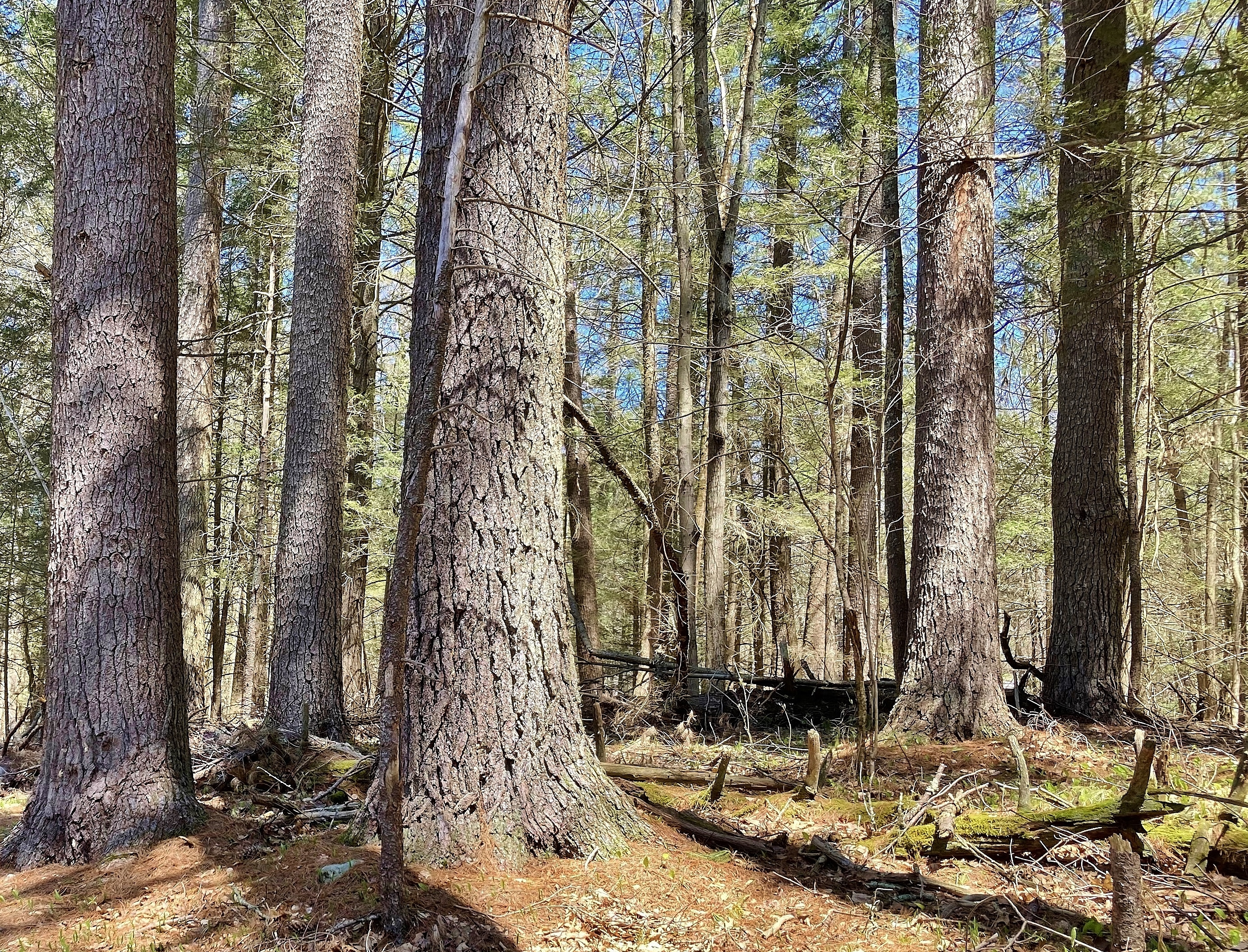
White pines (April 2022)
