= Davey Woods State Nature Preserve =

State Nature Preserve in Champaign County, Ohio

- Davey Woods Dedicated Nature Preserve
- IUCN category V (protected landscape/seascape)
- Location within Ohio Location within the United States
- Location: Champaign County, Ohio
- Nearest city: Urbana
- Coordinates: 40.138°N 83.908°W
- Area: 103 acres (42 ha)
- Website: naturepreserves.ohiodnr.gov/daveywoods

Davey Woods State Nature Preserve is a 103-acre (42 ha) nature preserve in Champaign County, Ohio. The preserve is classified as an old-growth forest.

It is one of the best woodlots remaining in this part of Ohio. Named in honor of the Davey Tree Expert Company which, through The Nature Conservancy, provided half the funding to acquire this site in 1989.

The terrain is hilly for this part of the state and offers hiking and the opportunity to catch the glimpse of native wildlife.
