= Järvselja Nature Reserve =

Protected area in Estonia

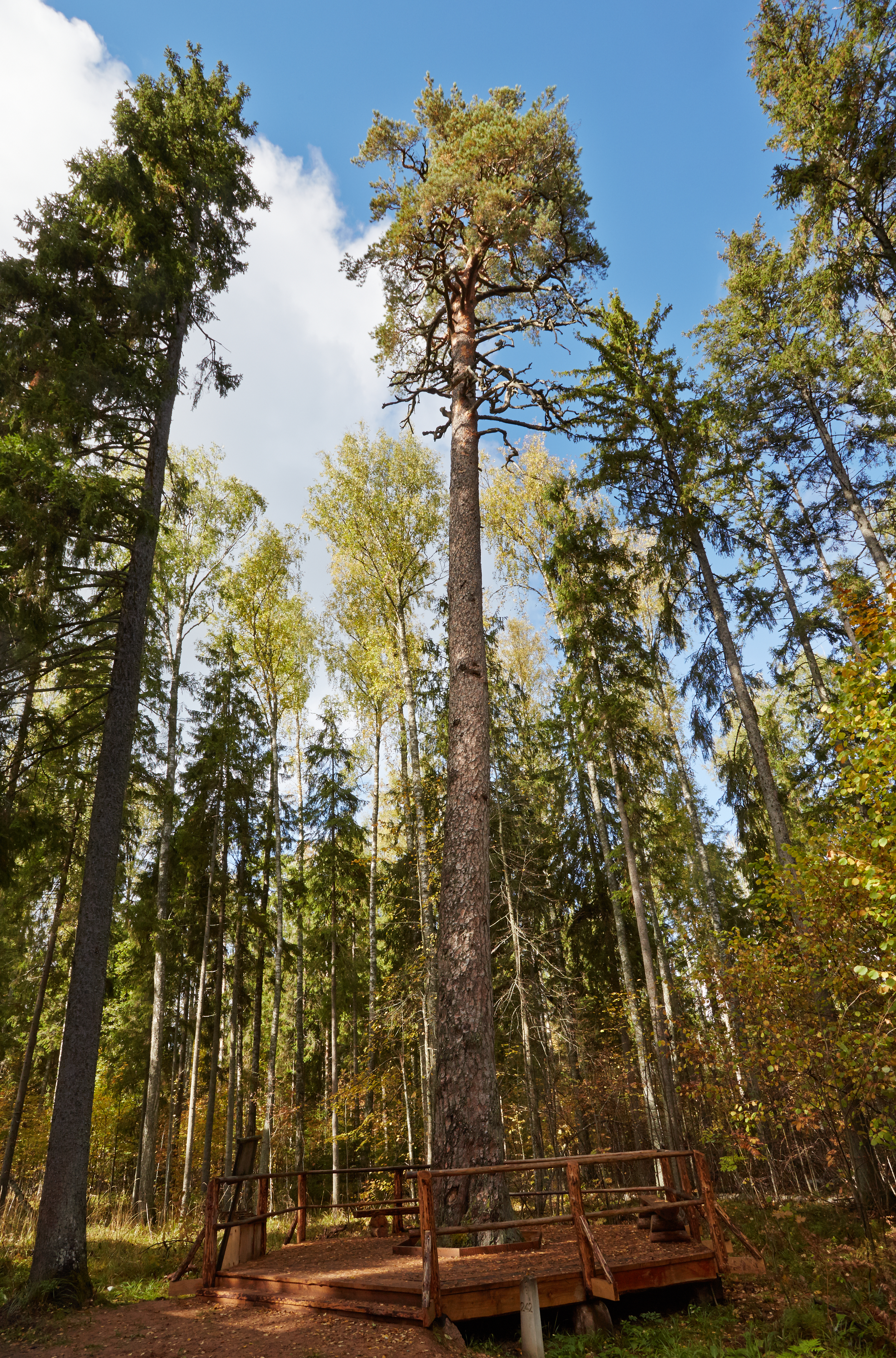
- King's Pine in Järvselja

- Location within Estonia
- Location: Estonia
- Nearest city: Tartu
- Coordinates: 58°16′32″N 27°19′26″E
- Established: 1924

Järvselja Nature Reserve is a nature reserve situated in south-eastern Estonia, in Tartu County.

The purpose of the nature reserve is to preserve the old-growth forest of the area, consisting mainly of Scots pine trees, including the so-called King's Pine Tree (Estonian: kuningamänd), which is over 360 years old. The nature reserve also functions as an important habitat for several species of birds, including pygmy owl, grey-headed woodpecker and wood grouse. A 5-kilometre trail has been prepared for the convenience of visitors.
