= Northern hardwood forest =

North American forest ecosystem

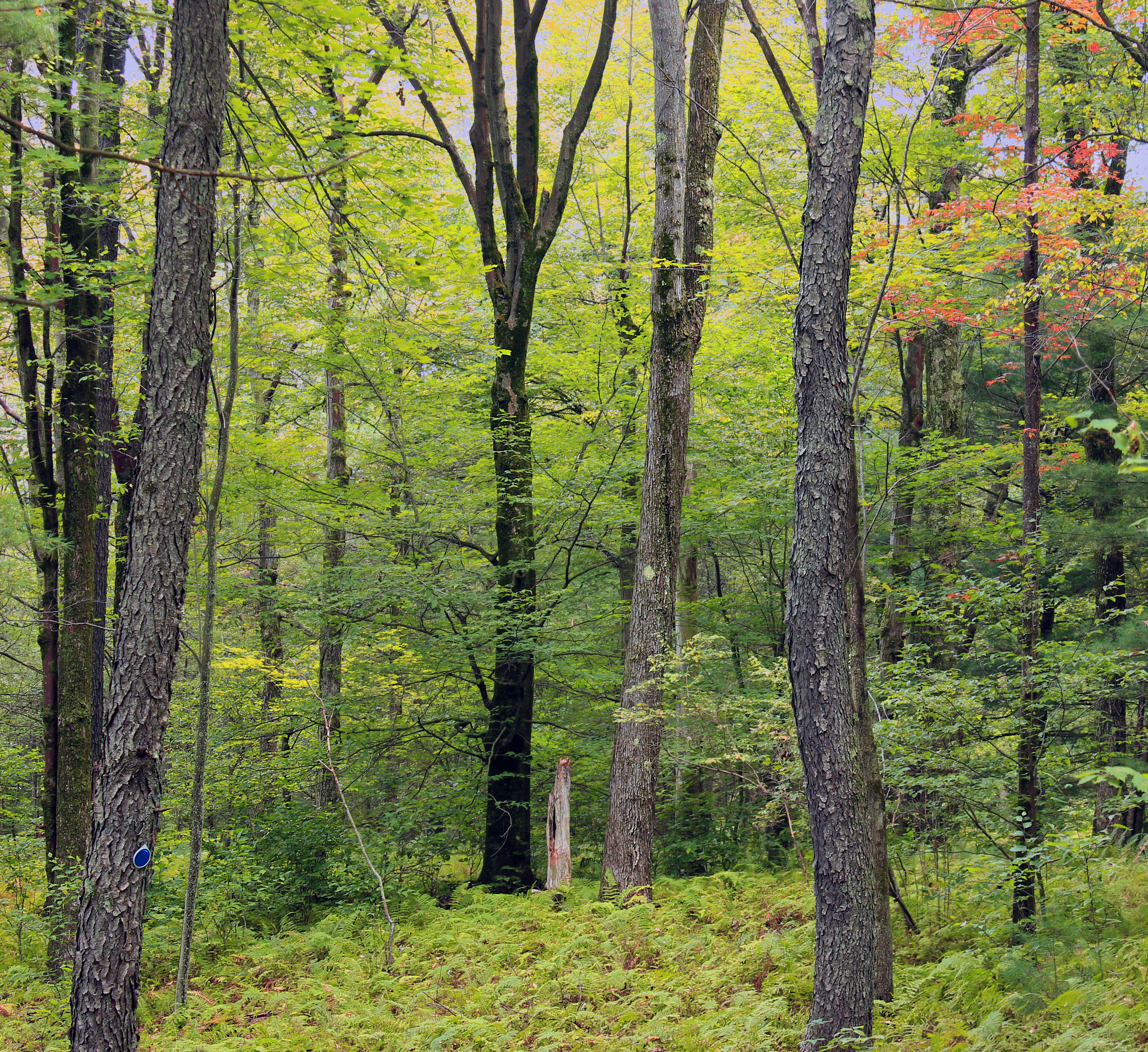
Austin T. Blakeslee Natural Area, Monroe County, Pennsylvania.

The northern hardwood forest is a general type of North American forest ecosystem found over much of southeastern and south-central Canada, Ontario, and Quebec, extending south into the United States in northern New England, New York, and Pennsylvania, and west along the Great Lakes to Minnesota and western Ontario. Some ecologists consider it a transitional forest because it contains species common to both the oak-hickory forest community to the south and the Boreal forest community to the north. The trees and shrub species of the Northern Hardwood Forest are known for their brilliant fall colors, making the regions that contain this forest type popular fall foliage tourist destinations.

== Composition ==
Sugar maple, yellow birch, American beech, and white ash are the common key indicator tree and shrub species in the Northern Hardwood Forest. Other species include eastern hemlock and eastern white pine. Herb and heath species include wintergreen, wild sarsaparilla, and wood sorrel. Birds and animals common to the Northern Hardwood Forest include the black-capped chickadee, white-throated sparrow, cedar waxwing, porcupine, snowshoe hare, white-tailed deer, and American red squirrel.

Most of the Northern Hardwood Forest is not virgin forest, but regrowth following centuries of commercial timber harvesting and the clearing of land for agricultural purposes. This is particularly true of New England, New York, and Eastern Canada, where the land was cleared to make room for farms in the 17th and 18th centuries and subsequently abandoned in the 19th century when farming interests migrated to the midwestern United States and central Canada.

The Northern Hardwood Forest is indigenous to several well-known parks and national forests, including the Boundary Waters region of Minnesota, New York's Adirondack Park, the White Mountain National Forest in New Hampshire, the Green Mountain National Forest in Vermont, Baxter State Park and Acadia National Park in Maine, and Fundy National Park in New Brunswick. The Berkshires region of western Massachusetts is very typical of a Northern Hardwood Forest ecosystem. Northern hardwood stands are also found in the higher elevations of the southern Blue Ridge Mountains, typically between 4,500 feet (1,400 m) and 5,500 feet (1,700 m), where climatic conditions resemble those in northern states and southern Canada.

== See also ==
- Hardwood forest plants
- Appalachian hemlock–northern hardwood forest
- Central U.S. hardwood forests
- New England/Acadian forests
- Temperate broadleaf and mixed forests
