= Garden Mountain Cluster =

Protected natural area in Virginia, United States

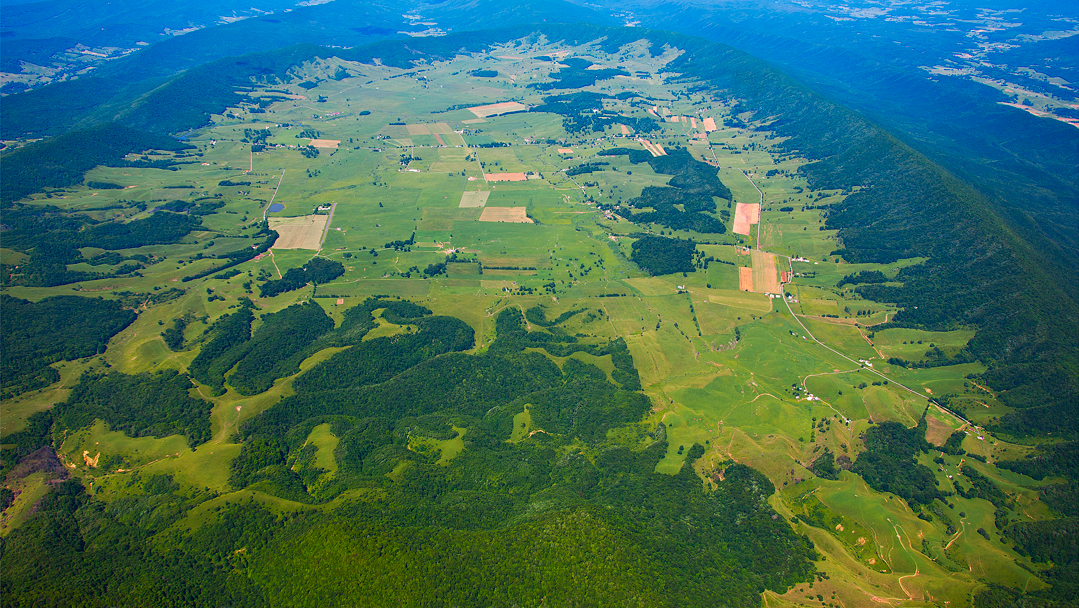
- Aerial view of Garden Mountain where it encircles Burke's Garden

- Location within Virginia Location within the United States
- Location: Bland, Tazewell, Smyth Counties; Virginia, United States
- Nearest town: Tazewell, Virginia
- Coordinates: 37°6′27″N 81°20′28″W
- Administrator: U.S. Forest Service

The Garden Mountain Cluster is a region in the Jefferson National Forest recognized by The Wilderness Society for its diversity of habitats extending along the east, south and west of Burke's Garden. The cluster, part of the Appalachian Mountains in southwest Virginia, connects wildlands in the high country of Garden Mountain and adjacent streams and ridges in one of the most remote areas of Virginia.

== Description ==
The Garden Mountain Cluster contains seven wildlands with different degrees of protection: wilderness areas, a study area and two areas recognized by the Wilderness Society as "Mountain Treasures", areas that are worthy of protection from logging and road construction.

The areas in the cluster are:

- Wilderness Areas
  - Hunting Camp Creek Wilderness
  - Garden Mountain Wilderness
  - Beartown Wilderness
- Study Areas
  - Lynn Camp Creek Wilderness Study Area
- Wild areas recognized by the Wilderness Society as "Mountain Treasures"
  - Beartown Wilderness Addition A
  - Beartown Wilderness Addition B

== Location and access ==
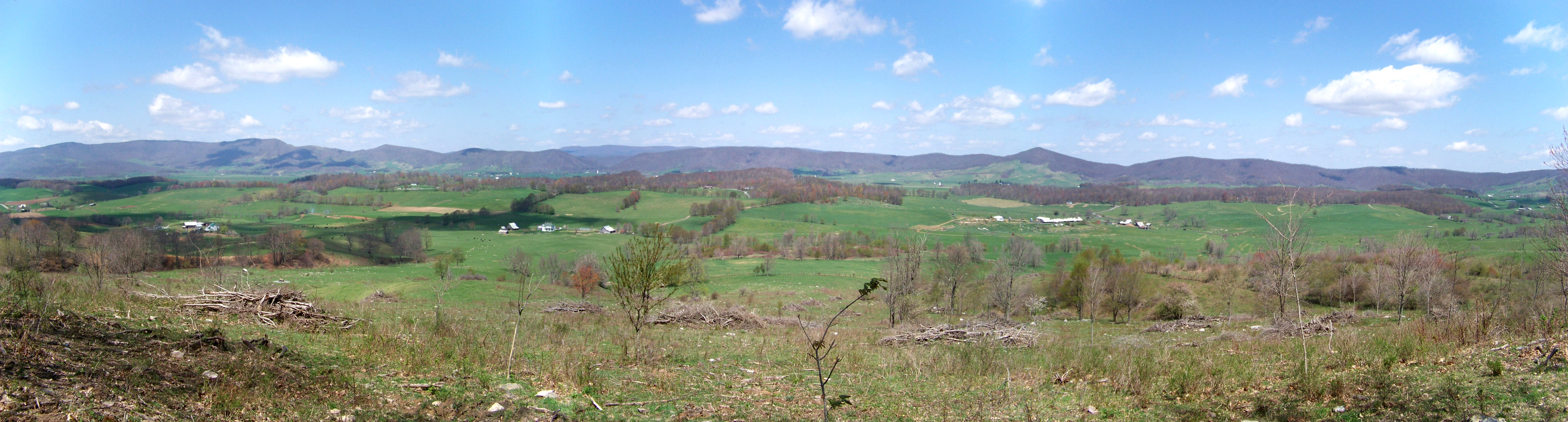

Panorama view of Burke's Garden

The cluster extends around the western, southern and eastern sides of Burke's Garden. VA 16, on the southern side, and VA 42, on the eastern side, intersect with roads leading into the cluster. Access from Burke's Garden is somewhat restricted because of the steep rise of the slopes around the bowl forming the garden.

The Appalachian Trail passes through the full length of the cluster for 26.6 miles. From north to south, the trail crosses Va 615, Suiter Road, to enter the cluster at Hunting Camp Creek Wilderness. The trail climbs Brushy Mountain, then descends to cross Hunting Camp Creek, passes by Jenkins Shelter, climbs Garden Mountain, continues along the ridge of Garden Mountain with views of Burke's Garden, passes by Davis Farm Campsite, and crosses Va 623. The trail then enters Garden Mountain Wilderness continuing along the ridge of Garden Mountain. After leaving Garden Mountain Wilderness, the trail passes by Chestnut Ridge Shelter, goes along the boundary of Beartown Wilderness then turns south, descends through Beartown Wilderness Addition B, crosses USFS road 222, Poor Valley Road, to reach Lick Creek. Now the trail enters Lynn Camp Creek Wilderness Study Area, crosses over Lynn Camp Mountain reaching Lynn Camp Creek, then ascends Brushy Mountain passing Knot Maul Branch Shelter before descending to VA 42 to exit the cluster at the boundary of the wilderness study area.

Roads and trails in the cluster are shown on National Geographic Map 787 (Blacksburg, New River Valley). A great variety of information, including topographic maps, aerial views, satellite data and weather information, is obtained by selecting the link with the wild land's coordinates in the upper right of this page.

== Biological significance ==
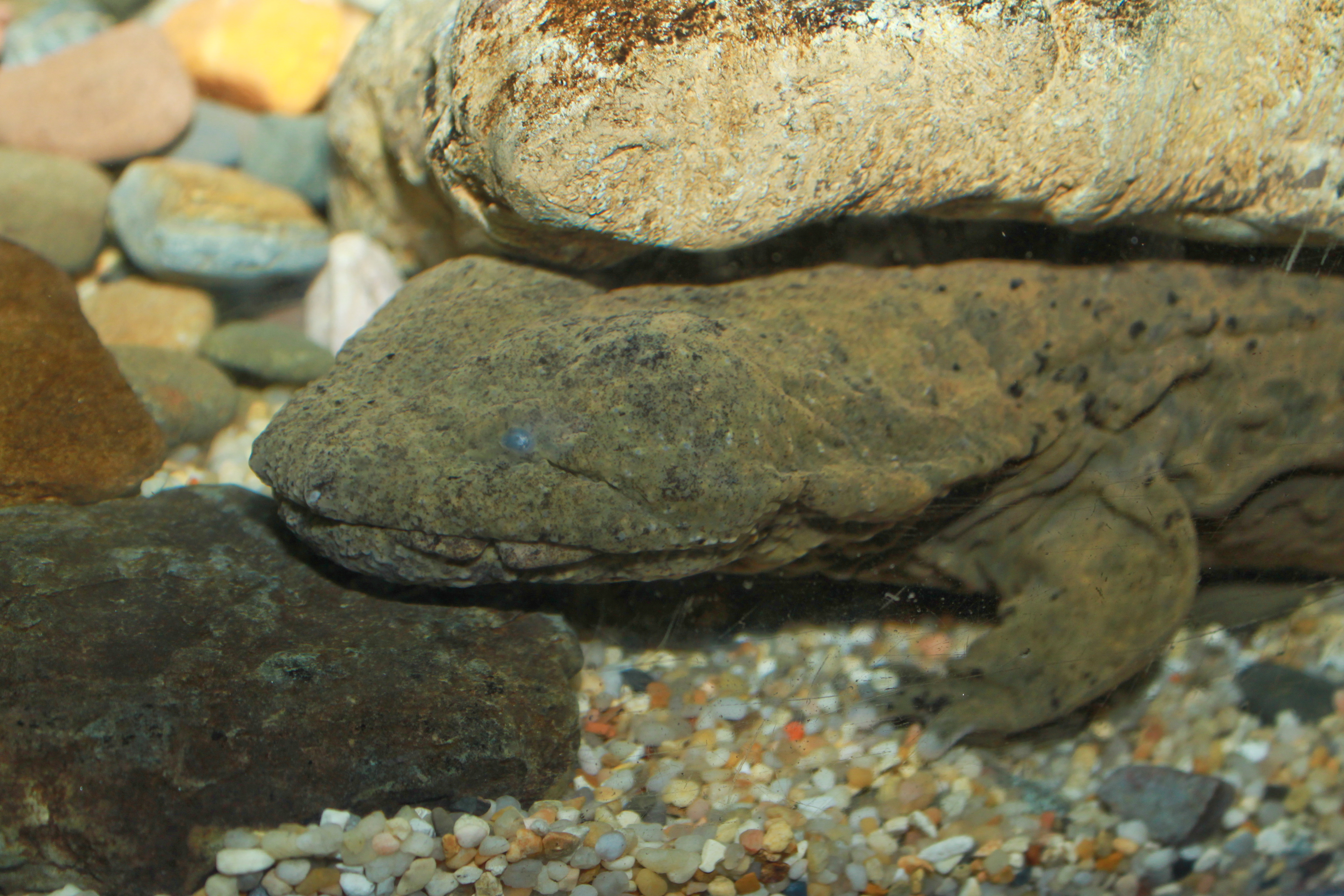
Hellbender, Cryptobranchus alleganiensis

The land form, climate, soils and geology of the Appalachian highlands, as well as its evolutionary history, have created one of the most diverse collection of plants and animals in the deciduous forests of the temperate world. The cluster's large tract of land supports species, such as black bear and some bird species, that require extensive tracts of unbroken forest for survival.

The cluster provides habitat and watershed for species that are critically imperiled (G1), imperiled (G2) or vulnerable (G3), as indicated by their NatureServe conservation status. The Virginia Department of Conservation and Recreation, Natural Heritage Program gives a list of these species for the counties included in the cluster, Bland, Smyth and Wythe. Among these are:

=== Animals ===
Mammals:

- Indiana bat, Myotis sodalis, G2
- Northern long-eared myotis, Myotis septentrionalis, G1, G2
- Virginia big-eared bat, Corynorhinus townsendii virginianus, G3, G4, T2

Amphibians:

- Hellbender, Cryptobranchus alleganiensis, G3, G4
- Northern pygmy salamander, Desmognathus organi, G3
- Weller's salamander, Plethodon welleri, G3

Fish:

- Blotchside logperch, Percina burtoni, G2, G3
- Bluestone sculpin, Cottus, G2
- Candy darter, Etheostoma osburni, G3
- Clinch dace, Chrosomus, G1
- Clinch sculpin, Cottus, G1, G2
- Ohio lamprey, Ichthyomyzon bdellium, G3, G4
- Popeye shiner, Notropis ariommus, G3
- Sickle darter, Percina williamsi, G2
- Tennessee dace, Chrosomus tennesseensis, G3
- Turquoise shiner, Erimonax monachus, G2
- Yellowfin madtom, Noturus flavipinnis, G1

Annelida (segmented worms):

- A cave lumbriculid worm, Stylodrilus beattiei, G2, G3

Arachnida (spiders and pseudoscorpions):

- A cave pseudoscorpion, Kleptochthonius, G1
- A cave pseudoscorpion, Kleptochthonius regulus, G1, G2
- Spruce-fir moss spider, Microhexura montivaga, G1

Bivalvia (mussels):

- Cumberland bean, Villosa trabalis, G1
- Fine-rayed pigtoe, Fusconaia cuneolus, G1
- Fluted kidneyshell, Ptychobranchus subtentum, G2
- Green floater, Lasmigona subviridis, G3
- Little-winged pearlymussel, Pegias fabula, G1
- Oyster mussel, Epioblasma capsaeformis, G1
- Purple bean, Villosa perpurpurea, G1
- Purple liliput, Toxolasma lividum, G3Q
- Rough rabbitsfoot, Theliderma cylindrica, G3, G4
- Shiny pigtoe, Fusconaia cor, G1
- Slabside pearlymussel, Pleuronaia dolabelloides, G2
- Spectaclecase, Margaritifera monodonta, G3
- Tan riffleshell, Epioblasma florentina aureola, G1
- Tennessee clubshell, Pleurobema oviforme, G2, G3
- Tennessee heelsplitter, Lasmigona holstonia, G3
- Tennessee pigtoe, Pleuronaia barnesiana,[ G2, G3

Crustacea (amphipods, isopods and decapods):

- A groundwater amphipod, Stygobromus, G2, G3
- Incurved cave isopod, Caecidotea incurva, G2, G4
- Tug Valley crayfish, Cambarus hatfieldi, GNR

Gastropoda (snails):

- Spiny riversnail, Io fluvialis, G2

Turbellaria (flatworms):

- A cave planarian, Geocentrophora cavernicola, G1, G2
- Chandler's planarian, Sphalloplana chandleri, G1, G2

Coleoptera (beetles):

- Burkes Garden cave beetle, Pseudanophthalmus hortulanus, G1
- Hoffman's cave beetle, Pseudanophthalmus hoffmani, G2, G3
- Maiden Spring cave beetle, Pseudanophthalmus virginicus, G1
- Vicariant cave beetle, Pseudanophthalmus vicarius, G2, G3

Diplopoda (millipedes):

- A millipede, Cleidogona lachesis, G2
- A millipede, Pseudotremia momus, G2
- A millipede, Dixioria pela, G2, T2
- A millipede, Dixioria fowleri, G2
- A millipede, Pseudotremia tuberculata, G2, G3
- A millipede, Appalachioria separanda hamata, G3, T2
- Armes' rough-backed millipede, Pseudotremia armesi, G2
- Big Cedar Creek millipede, Appalachioria falcifera, G1
- Hoffman's cleidogonid millipede, Cleidogona hoffmani, G3

Diplura (diplurans):

- A cave dipluran (Ward Cove), Litocampa, G1

Lepidoptera (butterflies and moths):

- Regal fritillary, Speyeria idalia, G3

Mecoptera (scorpionflies):

- Jefferson's short-nosed scorpionfly, Brachypanorpa jeffersoni, G2

Odonata (dragonflies and damselflies):

- Skillet clubtail, Gomphus ventricosus, G3

Plecoptera (stoneflies):

- Big stripetail stonefly, Isoperla major, G1
- Cryptic willowfly, Taeniopteryx nelsoni, G1
- Smokies needlefly, Megaleuctra williamsae, G2
- Virginia stonefly, Acroneuria kosztarabi, G1, G2

=== Plants ===
Non-vascular plants:

- A liverwort, Marsupella paroica, G3
- A liverwort, Bazzania nudicaulis, G2, G3
- A moss, Oncophorus raui, G3
- Horsehair threadwort, Sphenolobopsis pearsonii, G2?
- Rock gnome lichen, Cetradonia linearis, G3
- Sullivant's leafy liverwort, Plagiochila sullivantii, G2
- A lichen, Punctelia graminicola, GNR

Vascular plants:

- Appalachian black cohosh, Actaea rubifolia, G3
- Basil mountain-mint, Pycnanthemum clinopodioides, G1, G2
- Blue Ridge purple sedge, Carex manhartii, G3, G4
- Bog bluegrass, Poa paludigena, G3
- Box huckleberry, Gaylussacia brachycera, G3
- Canby's mountain-lover, Paxistima canbyi, G2
- Carey's saxifrage, Micranthes careyana, G3
- Fraser fir, Abies fraseri, G2
- Glade spurge, Euphorbia purpurea, G3
- Gray's lily, Lilium grayi, G3
- Large-leaved grass-of-parnassus, Parnassia grandifolia, G3
- Long-stalked holly, Ilex collina, G3
- Mountain bittercress, Cardamine clematitis, G3
- Piratebush, Buckleya distichophylla, G3
- Roan Mountain sedge, Carex roanensis, G2, G3
- Tennessee pondweed, Potamogeton tennesseensis, G2, G3
- Torrey's mountainmint, Pycnanthemum torreyi, G2
- Virginia roundleaf birch, Betula lenta var. uber, G1Q

=== Natural communities ===
Plant communities include:

- Terrestrial, high elevation forests, grasslands, and rock outcrops
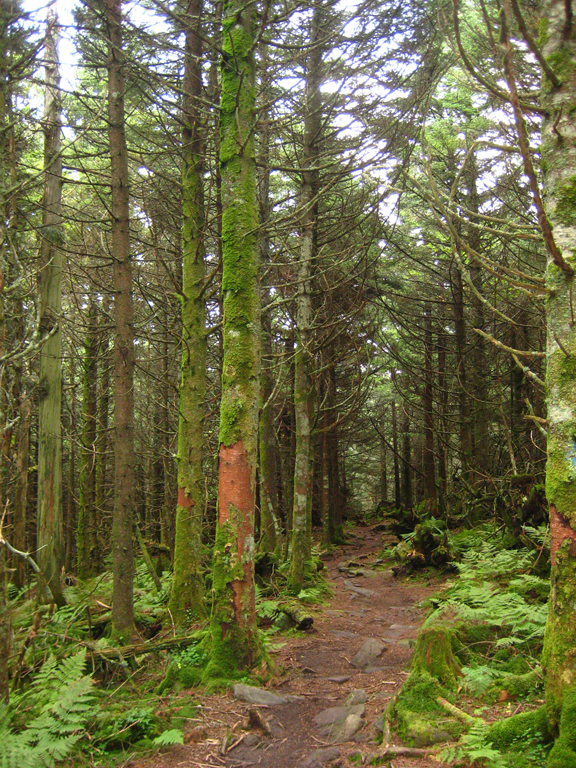
  Mount Rogers - spruce-fir forest
  - Spruce and fir forests
    - Southern Appalachian red spruce forest (deciduous shrub type)
      Picea rubens / Viburnum lantanoides - Vaccinium erythrocarpum / Huperzia lucidula - Clintonia borealis forest, G2
    - Southern Appalachian red spruce forest (evergreen shrub type)
      Picea rubens - (Abies fraseri) / (Rhododendron catawbiense, Rhododendron maximum) forest, G1
    - Southern Appalachian red spruce - northern hardwood forest / rhododendron forest
      Picea rubens - Betula alleghaniensis / Rhododendron (R. maximum, R. catawbiense) forest, G1?
  - Southern Appalachian shrub and grass balds
    - Southern Appalachian grassy bald
      Danthonia compressa - Carex brunnescens - Sibbaldia tridentata herbaceous vegetation, G1
    - Southern Appalachian deciduous heath bald
      Menziesia pilosa - Vaccinium (V. erythrocarpum, V. simulatum, V. corymbosum) - Sorbus americana shrubland, G2
  - Northern hardwood forests
    - Southern Appalachian northern hardwood forest
      Acer saccharum - Betula alleghaniensis - Fagus grandifolia - Aesculus flava / Ageratina altissima var. roanensis - Eurybia chlorolepis forest, G3, G4
  - High-elevation cove forest
    - Southern Appalachian high-elevation rich cove forest
      Acer saccharum - Aesculus flava - Betula alleghaniensis / Caulophyllum thalictroides - Actaea podocarpa - Dryopteris intermedia forest, G3
- Terrestrial-low elevation mesic forests
  - Rich cove forest
    - Southern Appalachian rich cove forest (sugar maple - buckeye type)
      Acer saccharum - Tilia americana var. heterophylla - Aesculus flava / Caulophyllum thalictroides - Hydrophyllum (H. canadense, H. macrophyllum) forest, G3, G4
    - Southern Appalachian limestone rich cove forest
      Tilia americana var. heterophylla - Aesculus flava - Acer saccharum / Staphylea trifolia / Cystopteris bulbifera - Asarum canadense forest, G3, G4
  - Montane mixed oak and oak - hickory forests
    - Southern Appalachian montane mixed oak forest (northern red oak - chestnut oak submesic type)
      Quercus rubra - Quercus montana - Magnolia (M. acuminata, M. fraseri) / Acer pensylvanicum forest, G4?
    - Central Appalachian montane oak - hickory forest (acidic type)
      Quercus rubra - Quercus (Q. montana, Q. alba) - Carya ovalis / Carex pensylvanica - (Calamagrostis porteri) forest, G3, G4
- Terrestrial low-elevation woodlands, barrens, and rock outcrops
  - Mountain / piedmont acidic woodlands
    - Central Appalachian xeric chestnut oak - Virginia pine woodland
      Quercus montana - Pinus virginiana - (Pinus pungens) / Schizachyrium scoparium - Dichanthelium depauperatum woodland, G3?
    - Appalachian xeric pine outcrop woodland
      Pinus (P. rigida, P. virginiana) / Gaylussacia baccata / (Carex pensylvanica, Danthonia spicata) woodland, G3
  - Mountain/piedmont cliffs
    - Southern Appalachian mesic calcareous cliff
      (Hydrangea arborescens, Physocarpus opulifolius) / Heuchera villosa - Micranthes caroliniana shrub herbaceous vegetation, G2
- Palustrine - non-alluvial wetlands of the mountains
  - Montane woodland seeps
    - Southern Appalachian high-elevation seep (umbrella-leaf - lettuce saxifrage type)
      Diphylleia cymosa - Micranthes micranthidifolia - Laportea canadensis herbaceous vegetation, G3
    - Ridge and valley inland salt marsh
      Juncus gerardii - Bolboschoenus robustus - Hibiscus moscheutos herbaceous vegetation, G1

== Geologic history ==
The cluster is in the Ridge and Valley Province that extends along the western boundary of Virginia. The Ridge and Valley Province is composed of long, relatively level-crested, ridges with highest elevations reaching over 3,600 feet (1,100 m). The province marks the eastern boundary in the Paleozoic era of an older land surface on the east. It was uplifted and eroded during the Paleozoic with extensive folding and thrust-faulting. Resistant quartzite, conglomerates and sandstones form the ridge caps while less resistant shales and limestones eroded to form the intervening valleys. The province is part of the Appalachian Mountains.

Garden Mountain extends from Abingdon to the New River, where the ridge of Garden Mountain continues across the river but is now named Sinking Creek Mountain. The mountain completely surrounds Burkes Garden, an unusual geologic formation. From above Burke's Garden looks like the remnant of a volcano or a large lake. It is about 10 miles long and 5 miles wide (16 × 8 km). Called the Great Swamp by Native Americans, it was probably too wet for crops. There are several proposals about its creation. One claims the valley was a lake drained by a creek, Burke's Garden Creek, flowing through the gap on the western edge. Another claims it was a 6,500-foot (2,000 m) dome formed by a sandstone cap. Eroded by water, the cap cracked forming a flat valley below.

The Tennessee Valley Divide passes through the cluster along the southern rim of Burke's Garden, dividing the drainage for the Tennessee River and the New River. Roaring Fork, Lick Creek and Lynn Camp Creek, on the southwest, flow into the North Holston River which then flows into the Tennessee. Hunting Camp Creek, on the northeast, is part of the New River drainage. Both the New River and Tennessee River flow into the Ohio River.

== Cultural history ==
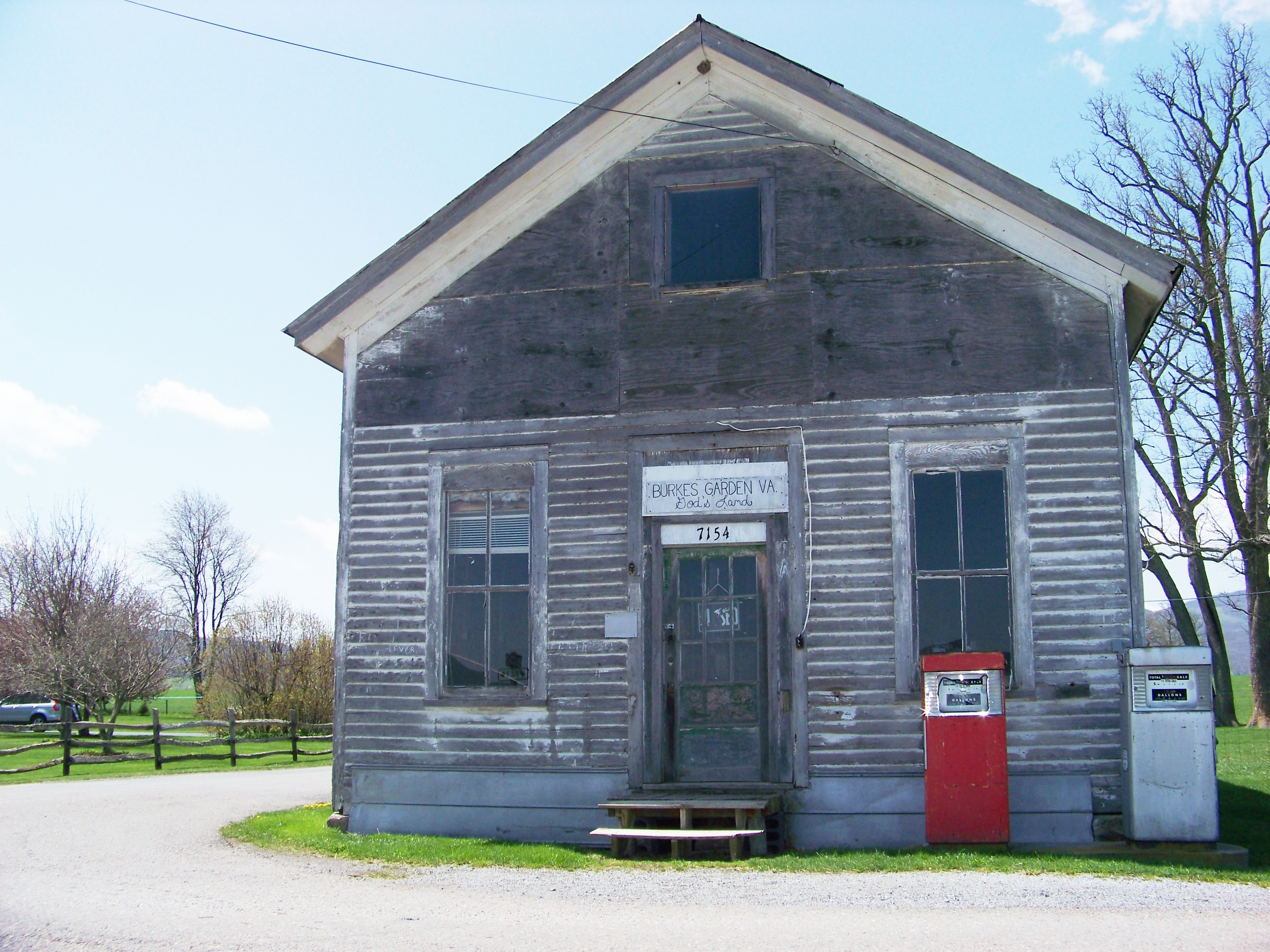
Burke's Garden

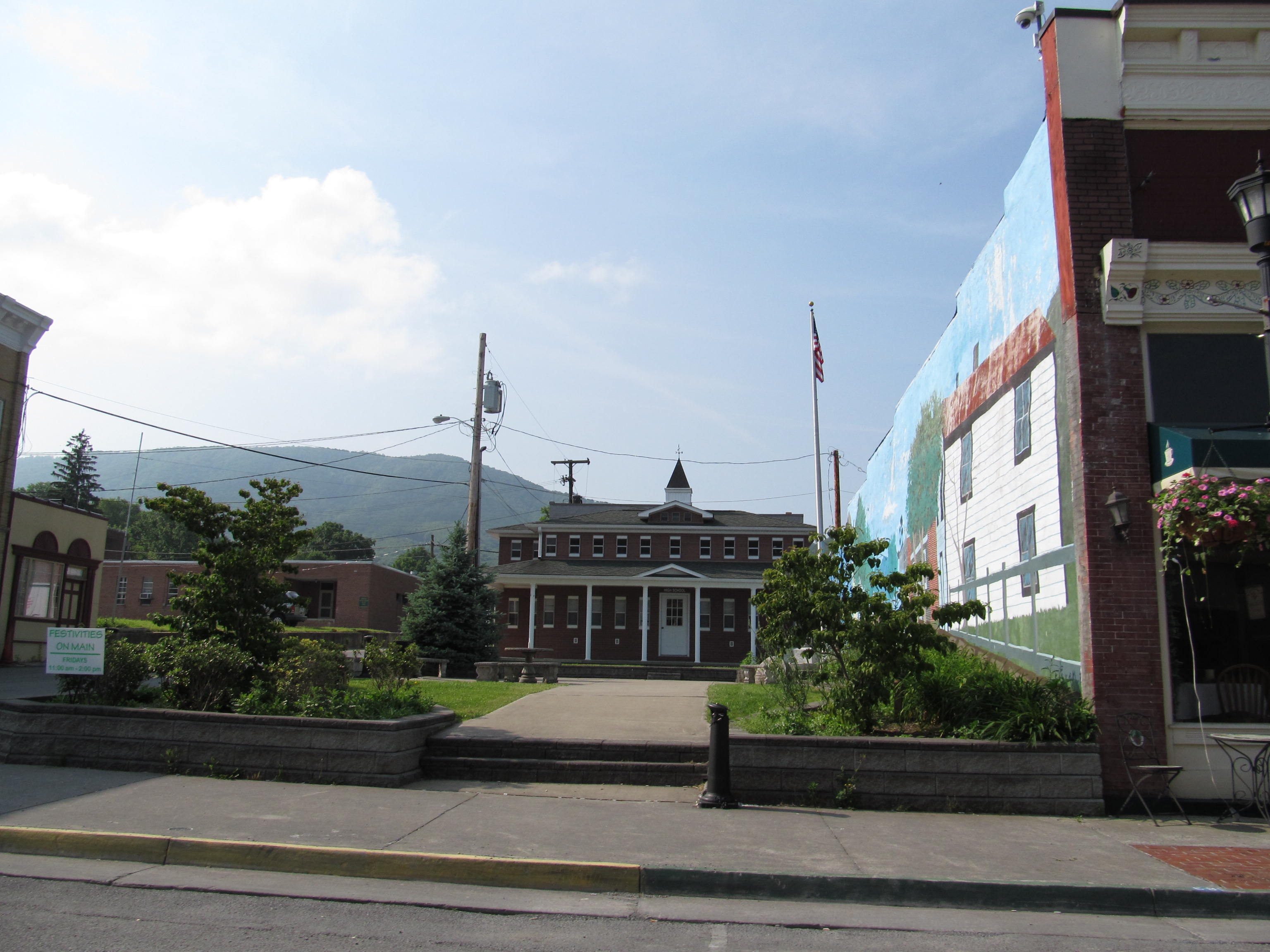
Tazewell, Virginia

According to legend, Burke's Garden was discovered in about 1748 by James Burk while chasing a wounded elk. After eating some potatoes, he covered the peelings with dirt in order to hide his presence from Indians. Later explorers, finding a large patch of potatoes that had sprouted from the peelings, named the place as "Burk's Garden". The "e" on the end of the name was added at a later time. The area was settled by German Lutherans who were so attached to the area that they refused to sell their land to George Vanderbilt. Vanderbilt, looking for a place to build a home, moved to North Carolina where he built the largest private home in America, the Biltmore Estate.

Tazewell, the largest town near the cluster and the seat of Tazewell County, has served as the financial center for the agricultural and coal mining interests in the region. Evidence of prosperity is given by the large homes built on several hills. The town was incorporated in 1866. The county was named for Henry Tazewell, who served from 1794 to 1799 as a United States senator.

== Other clusters ==
Other clusters of the Wilderness Society's "Mountain Treasures" in the Jefferson National Forest (north to south):

- Glenwood Cluster
- Craig Creek Cluster
- Barbours Creek-Shawvers Run Cluster
- Sinking Creek Valley Cluster
- Mountain Lake Wilderness Cluster
- Angels Rest Cluster
- Walker Mountain Cluster
- Kimberling Creek Cluster
- Mount Rogers Cluster
- Clinch Ranger District Cluster

== Gallery ==
=== Animals ===
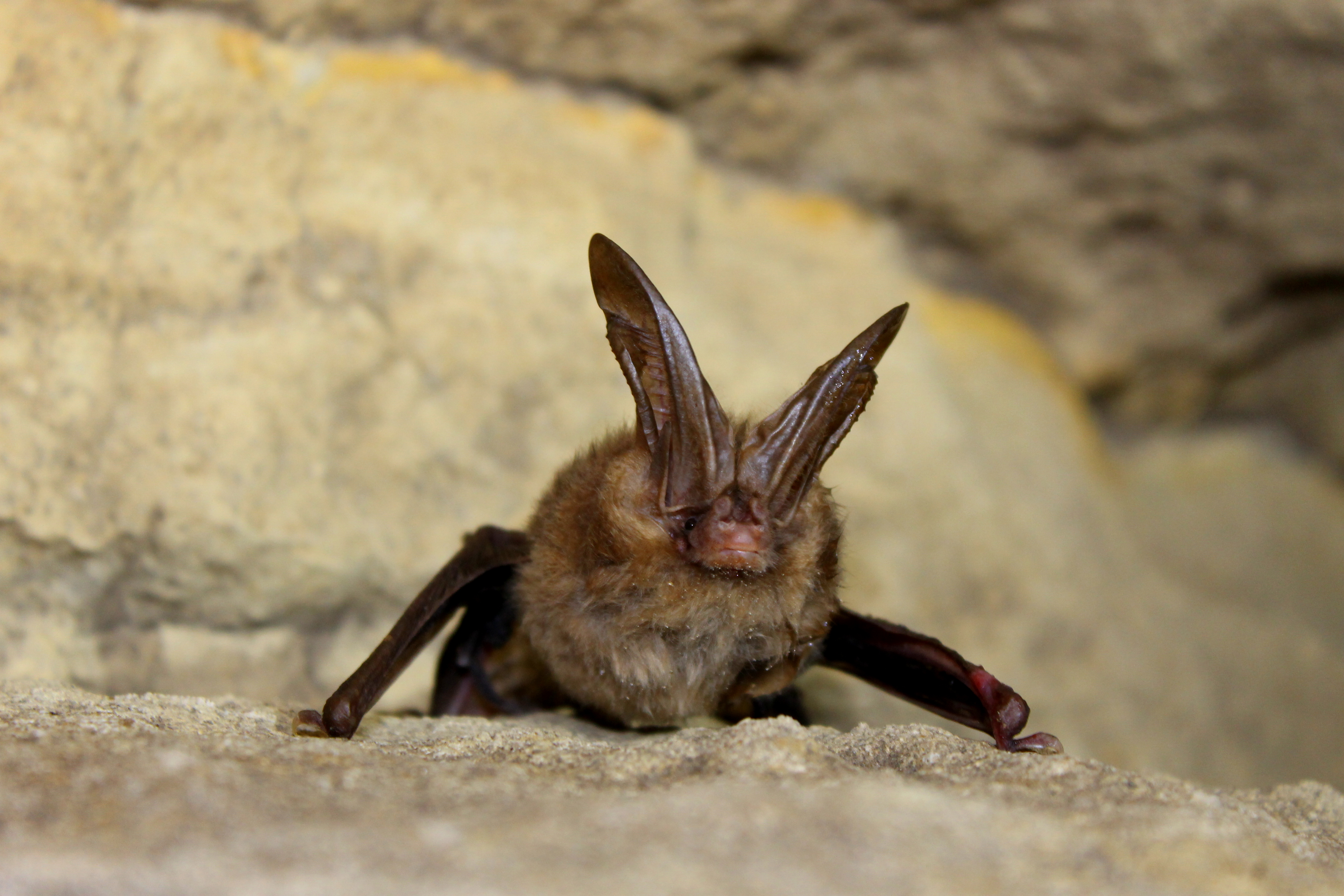
Virginia big-eared bat female

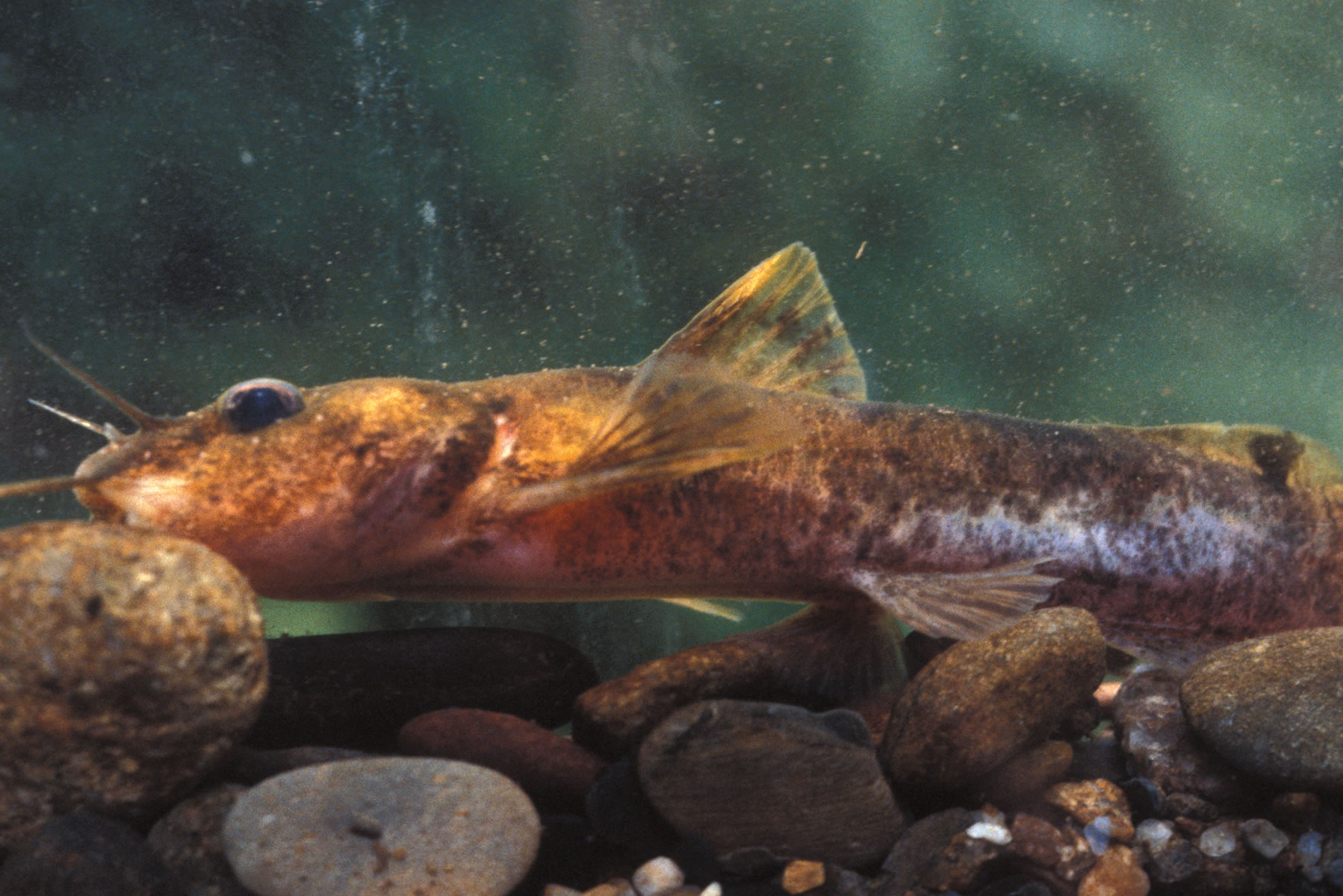
Noturus flavipinnis

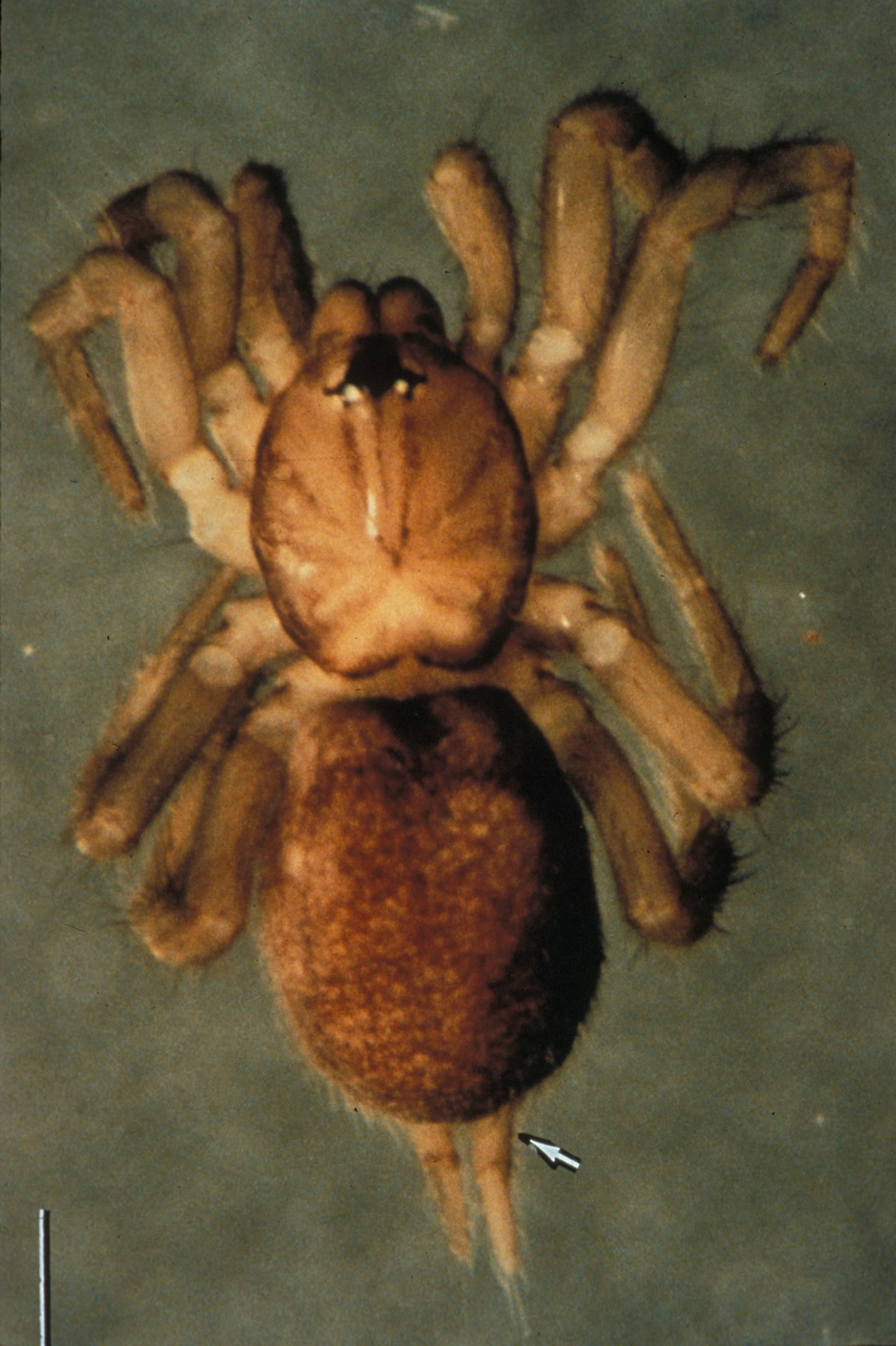
Spruce-fir moss spider

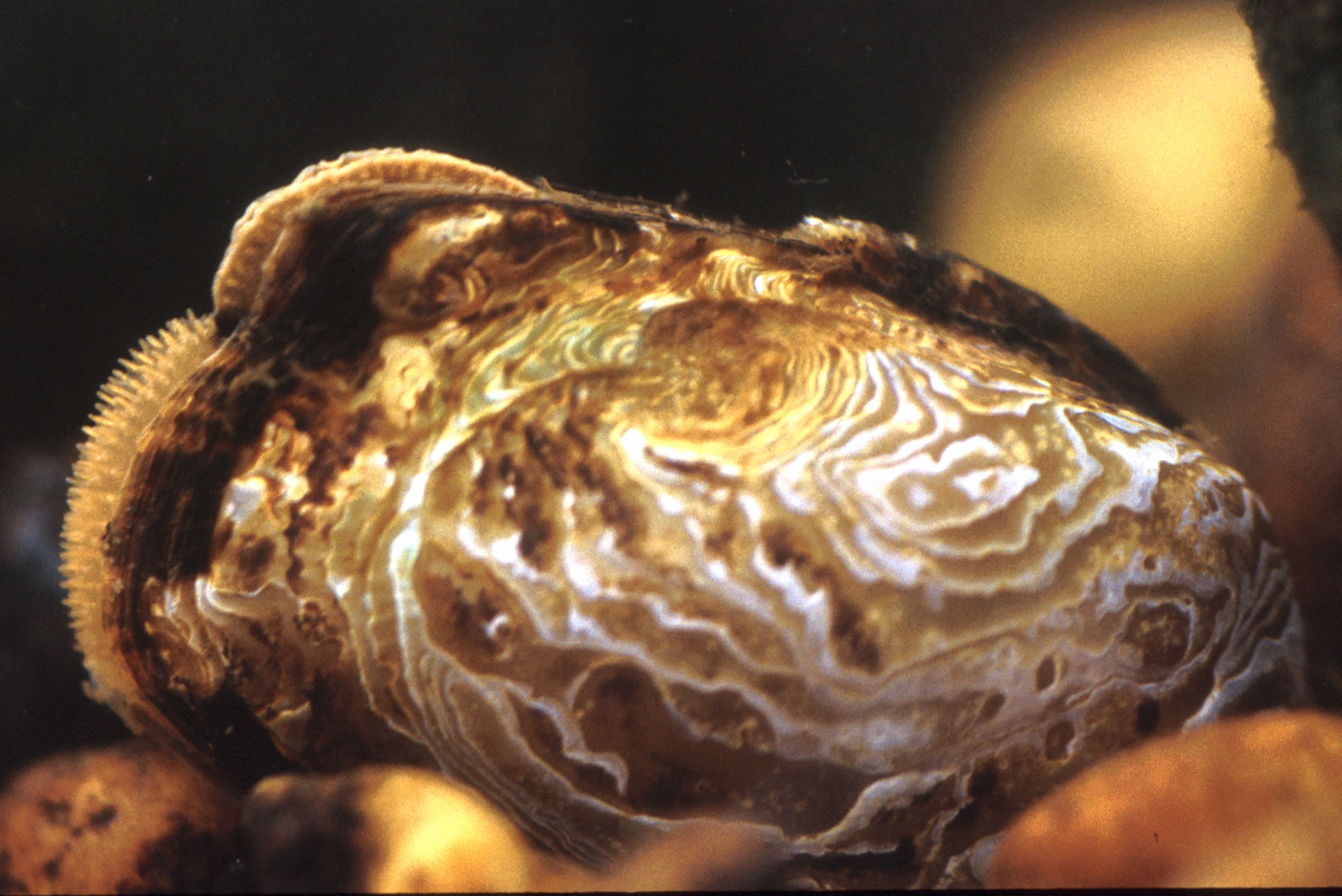
Pegias fabula

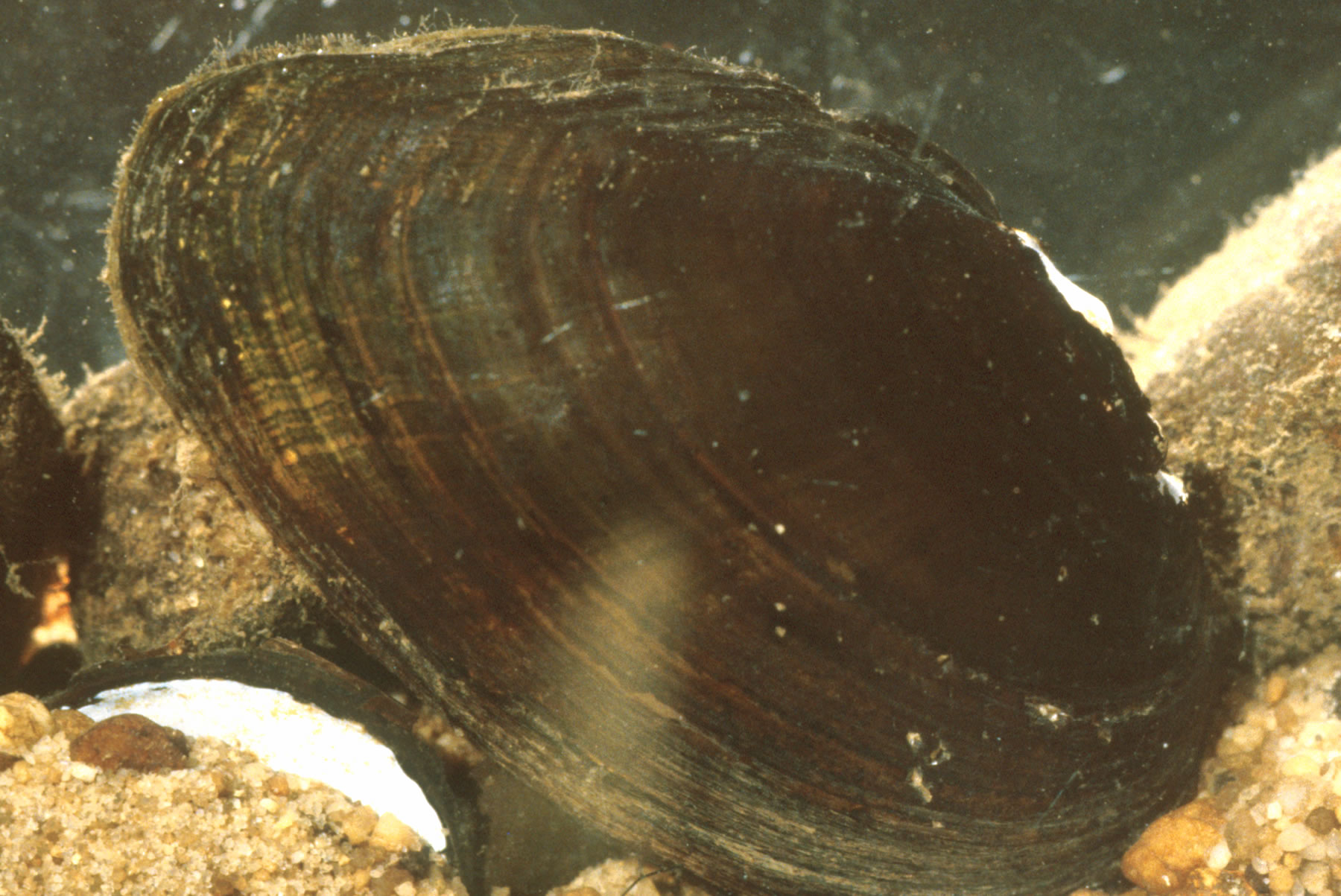
Villosa perpurpurea

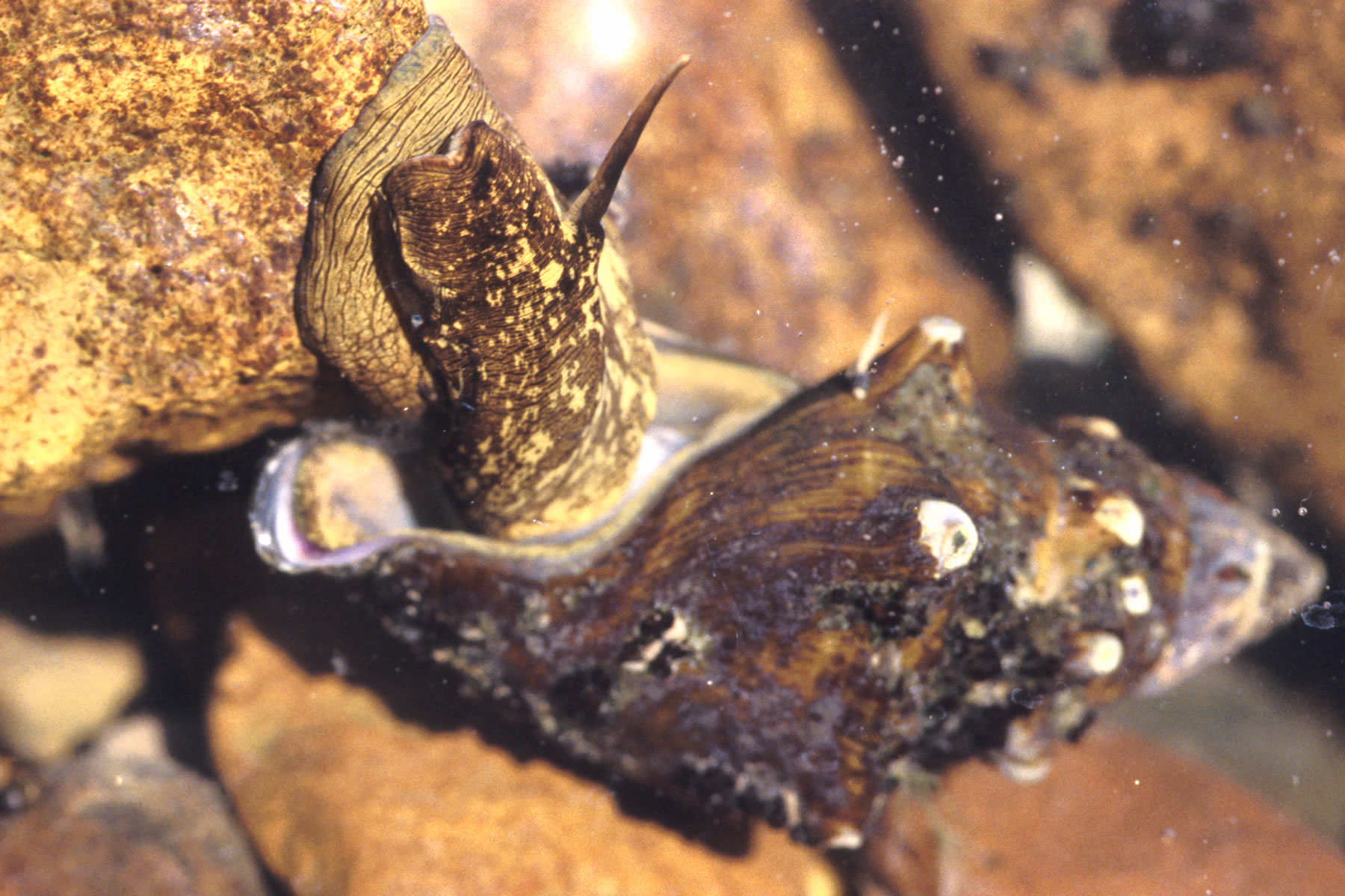
Io fluvialis

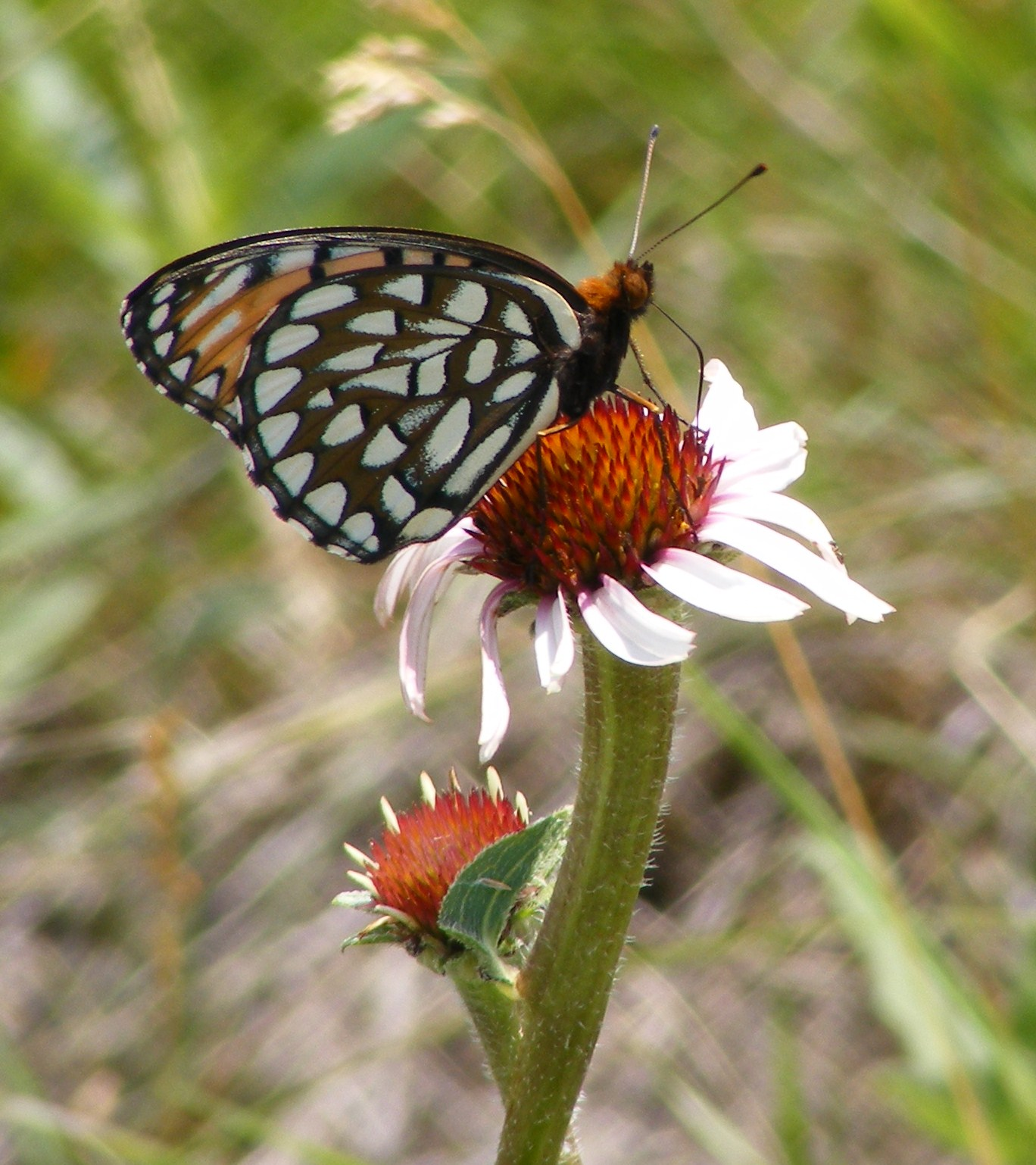
Regal fritillary

=== Plants ===
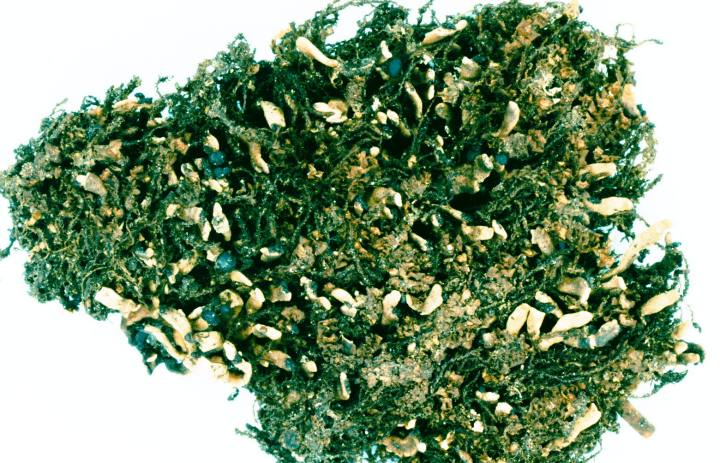
Cetradonia linearis

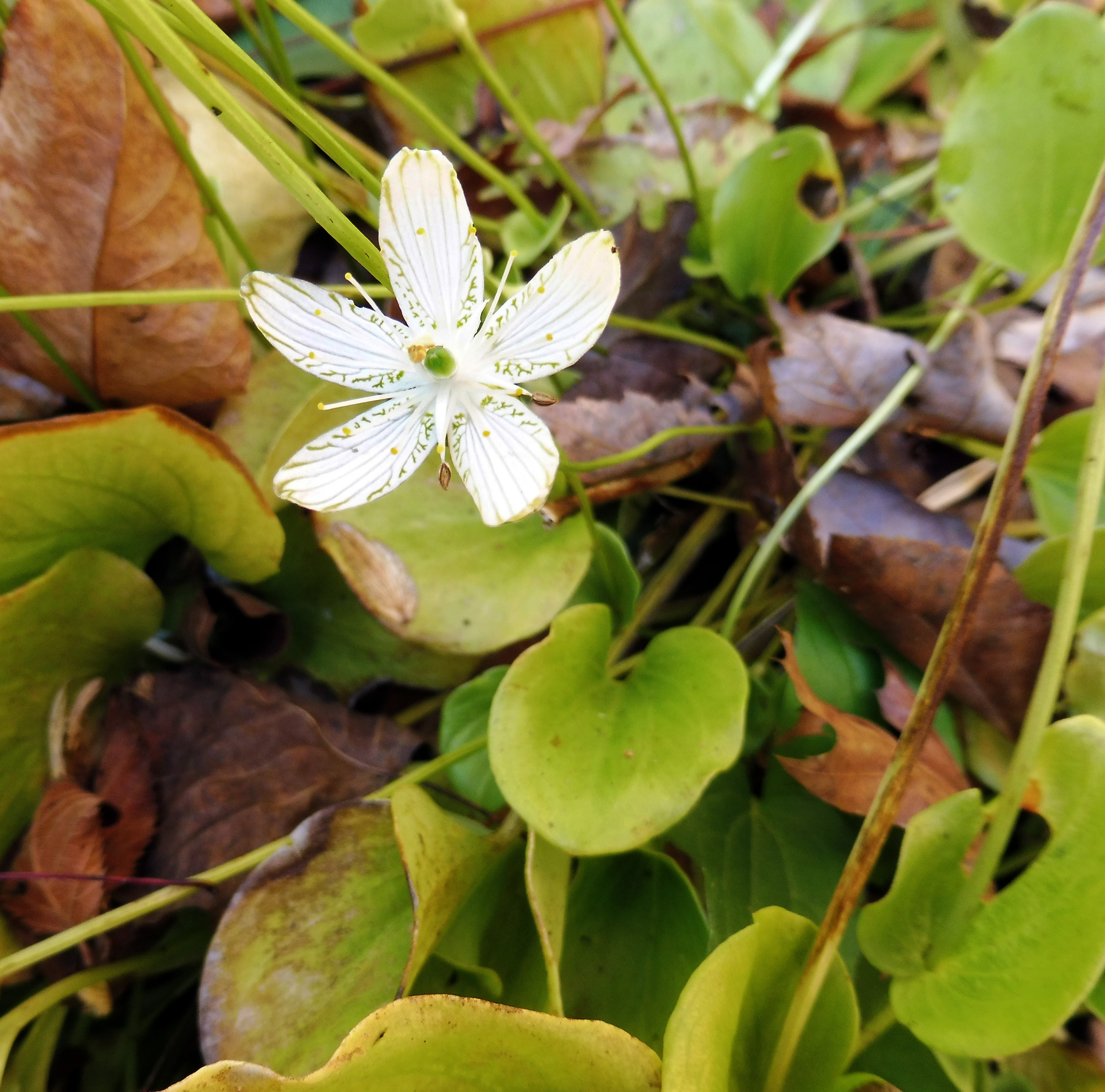
Parnassia grandifolia

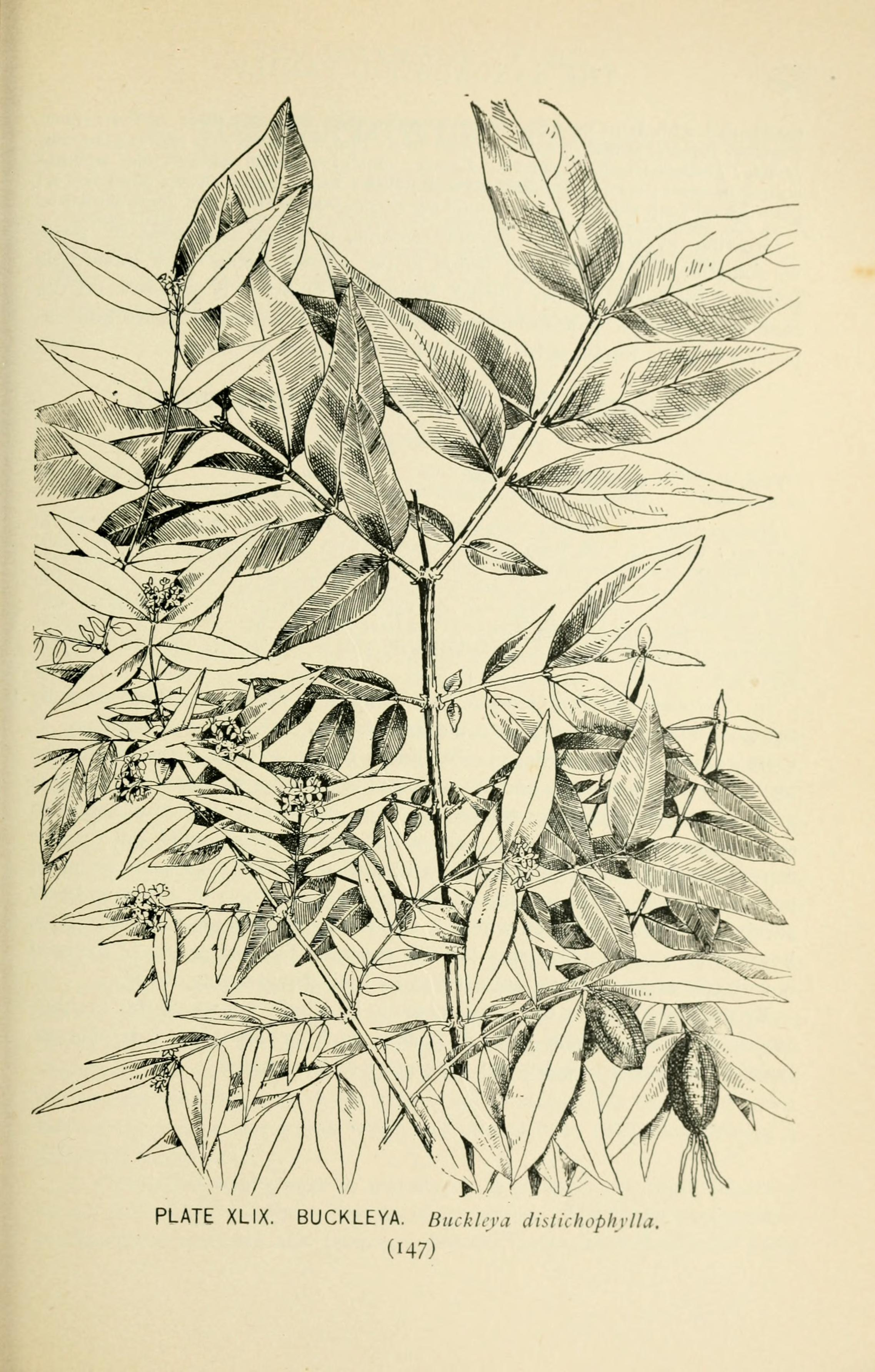
Pirate bush

== See also ==
- Appalachian-Blue Ridge forests
