= Beartown =

Beartown may refer to:

== Geography ==
- Beartown State Forest, a forest located in the towns of Great Barrington, Monterey, Lee, and Tyringham, Massachusetts, in the United States
- Beartown State Park, a state park located in Droop Mountain, in northern Greenbrier County, West Virginia, in the United States
- Beartown Mountain, a mountain located in the Clinch Mountain range, which is in eastern Russell County, Virginia, in the United States
- Balsam Beartown Mountain, a mountain located in Tazewell County, Virginia, in the United States
- Beartown Wilderness, a wilderness area in the George Washington and Jefferson National Forests, in Tazewell County, Virginia, in the United States
- Beartown Wilderness Addition A, a wildland in the George Washington and Jefferson National Forests of western Virginia, in the United States
- Beartown Wilderness Addition B, a wildland in the George Washington and Jefferson National Forests of western Virginia, in the United States

=== Communities ===
- Congleton is a town and civil parish in Cheshire, England, in the United Kingdom, nicknamed Beartown
- Beartown, New York, a hamlet located on Beartown Road in the Town of Western in Oneida County, New York, in the United States
- Beartown, West Virginia, an unincorporated community located in McDowell County, West Virginia, in the United States
- Beartown, Lancaster County, Pennsylvania, is an unincorporated community in Caernarvon Township in Lancaster County, Pennsylvania, in the United States

== Surname ==
Its Norwegian literal translation, Bjørnstad, is a family name

== Other ==
- Beartown (novel), a 2016 novel by Swedish writer Fredrik Backman
- Beartown (TV series), a 2020 television adaptation of Fredrick Backman's novel
