= Garden Mountain Wilderness =

Protected area in Virginia, US

- IUCN category Ib (wilderness area)
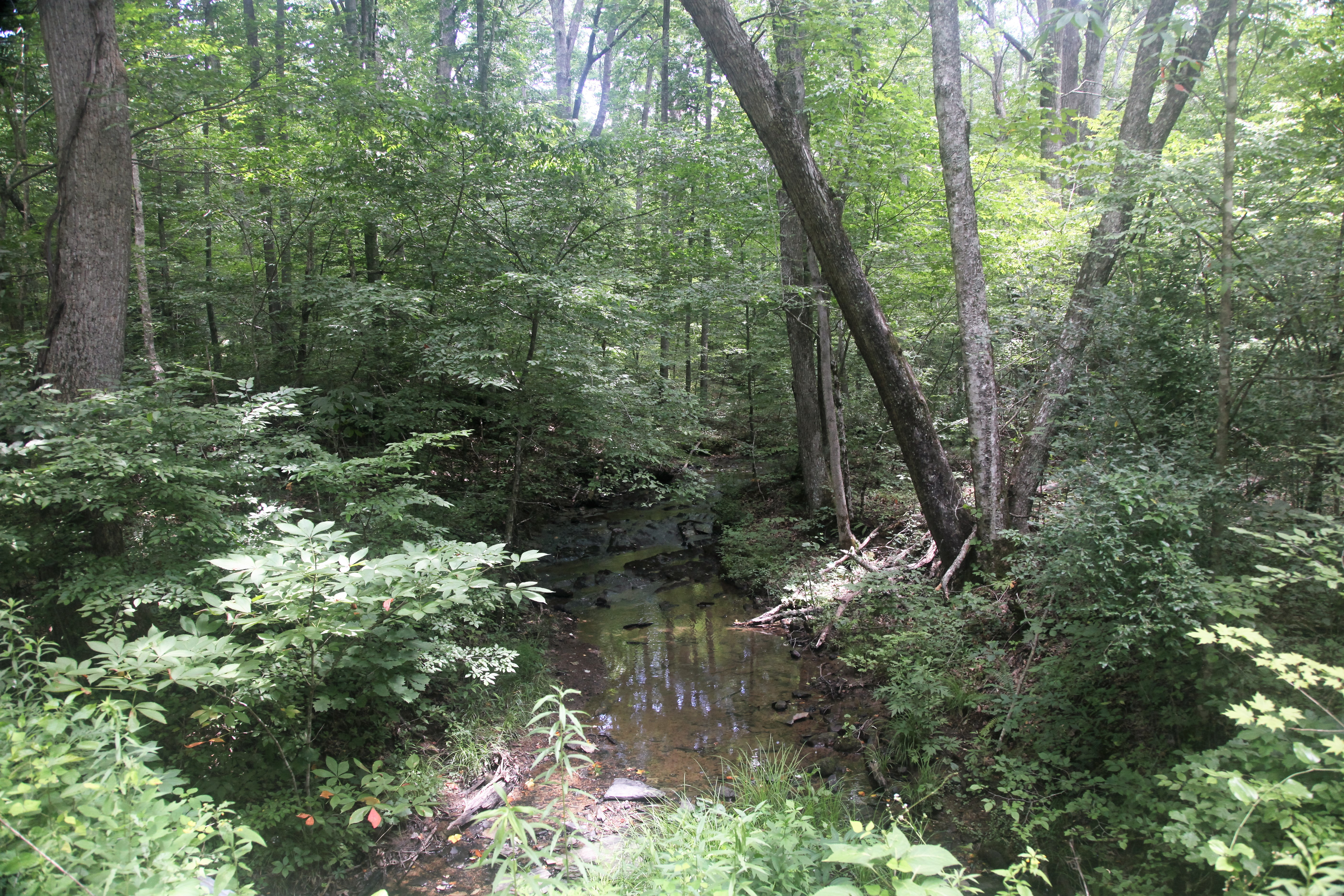
- Lick Creek, from Lick Creek Road

- Location within Virginia Location within the United States
- Location: Virginia, U.S.
- Nearest city: Burke's Garden, Virginia
- Coordinates: 37.05227°N 81.32556°W
- Area: 3,331 acres (13.48 km^{2})
- Established: 2009
- Governing body: U.S. Forest Service

Garden Mountain Wilderness is a U.S. wilderness area in the Eastern Divide Ranger District of the George Washington and Jefferson National Forests. It is a small wilderness area in western Virginia, consisting of an area of 3,331 acres (13.48 km^{2}) and bordering the Beartown and Hunting Camp Creek Wilderness. It was designated as wilderness area in 2009 by Omnibus Public Land Management Act of 2009. The wilderness area also borders a portion of the Appalachian Trail.

The Appalachian Trail passes along the ridge of Garden Mountain through a large stand of old-growth forest with an occasional glimpse of Burkes Garden, a valley formed when a large dome eroded leaving the valley surrounded by a ridge of mountains. Garden Mountain was part of the ancient dome.

The area is part of the Garden Mountain Cluster.

== Location and Access ==
Lying next to Burke's Garden, Virginia in Bland County, Virginia, the wilderness is bounded on the east by Va 623, on the northwest by the crest of Garden Mountain and on the southeast by the crest of Brushy Mountain. The area can be accessed from Va-623 on the east, Va 727 from the north and Va 625 from the south and west.

There are two trails in the area, the Appalachian Trail and the Lick Creek Trail. The Appalachian Trail stretches for 4.9 miles from the northern trailhead on Va 623 to the southern trailhead at Walker Gap. The Lick Creek Trail, 3.7 miles long, follows a grade along Lick Creek from the trailhead on Va 623 (Forest Trail 6522).

Old logging roads provide additional access, but are becoming overgrown except for those kept open by illegal ATV traffic along the western end of the area.

== Natural history ==
Yellow poplar, northern red oak, white oak, basswood, cucumbertree, white ash, eastern hemlock and red maple are found in the valleys while chestnut oak, scarlet oak, and yellow pine are found on ridgetops and exposed south and east slopes. A large part of the trees in the area are less than 100 years old because of logging and burning in the late 1800s and early 1900s, however there are about 840 acres of possible old growth trees. The area contains a pure stand of the unique table mountain pine, a tree that requires fire to reproduce.

Southern mountain cranberry, intermediate shield fern, Indian cucumber root, fire pink, wild sarsaparilla, bloodroot, black cohosh and white snake root are found along the tops of the mountains. Bird species include cerulean warblers, red crossbills, winter wrens and black throated green warblers.

Ponds and swamps created by beaver activity along Lick Creek provide a diversity of habitat for plants and other wildlife, including the endangered Tennessee dace.

== Topography ==
Surrounding the headwaters of Lick Creek, the wilderness has elevations ranging from 2500 feet at Lick Creek to 4080 feet at the crest of Garden Mountain. The area, lying within the Ridge and Valley Section of the central Appalachians, is marked by ridges tending northeast/southwest containing sandstone and shale. While the upper slopes of Garden Mountain have broad, shallow drainages, the lower slopes have narrow, deep drainages with steep side slopes

== Management ==
The wilderness is managed by the Forest Service through the Eastern Divide Ranger District of the George Washington & Jefferson National Forests.

There are some regulations to maintain the integrity of the area. For example, motorized equipment, motor vehicles and mountain bikes are prohibited, group size is limited to ten people, and limits are placed on camping.

== See also ==
- List of U.S. Wilderness Areas
- Garden Mountain Cluster
