= Bjørnstad =

Bjørnstad is a Norwegian surname. Notable people with the surname include:

- Alfred William Bjornstad (1874–1934), American army officer
- Anders Bjørnstad, Norwegian jazz trumpeter
- Andreas Skår Bjørnstad, Paralypmic swimmer
- Anne Bjørnstad, Norwegian screenwriter, co-creator of TV series Lilyhammer, Beforeigners, and others
- Eric Bjornstad (1934–2014), American climber and author
- Espen Bjørnstad, Norwegian skier
- Hans Bjørnstad (1928–2007), Norwegian ski jumper
- Helge Bjørnstad (born 1971), Norwegian ice sledge hockey player
- Henrik Bjørnstad (born 1979), Norwegian professional golfer
- Ivar Loe Bjørnstad, Norwegian jazz and rock drummer
- John Bjørnstad (1888–1968), Norwegian rower
- Jørgen Bjørnstad (1894–1942), Norwegian gymnast
- Ketil Bjørnstad (born 1952), Norwegian pianist and composer
- Ola Bjørnstad, Norwegian forester and civil servant
- Olaf B. Bjørnstad (1931–2013), Norwegian former ski jumper
- Olav Bjørnstad (1882–1963), Norwegian rower
- Roar Theodor Bjørnstad, after whom Björnstad syndrome was named
- Roy Bjørnstad (1925–2005), Norwegian actor
- Sivert Bjørnstad (born c.1990), Norwegian politician
- Svenn Erik Bjørnstad (born 1971), former Norwegian ice hockey player
- Tor Halvor Bjørnstad, Norwegian retired cross-country skier
- Victoria Hæstad Bjørnstad (born 1999), a Norwegian orienteer
- Vidar Bjørnstad (born 1955), Norwegian politician for the Labour Party

== See also ==
- Anthene bjoernstadi, or Bjørnstad's hairtail, a butterfly
