= Lynn Camp Creek Wilderness Study Area =

Wilderness area in Virginia, United States

- IUCN category Ib (wilderness area)
- Location within Virginia
- Location: Bland County Virginia, United States
- Nearest city: Bland, Virginia
- Coordinates: 37.02058°N 81.37478°W
- Area: 3,226 acres (1,306 ha)
- Established: 2009
- Administrator: U.S. Forest Service

The Lynn Camp Creek Wilderness Study Area, a 3226-acre site in the Eastern Divide Ranger District of the George Washington and Jefferson National Forests, was designated a wilderness study area by the Omnibus Public Lands Act of 2009.

Lying in a deep valley between Brushy Mountain and Lynn Camp Mountain, the area is remote with a section of the Appalachian Trail that is rarely visited.

The area is part of the Garden Mountain Cluster.

== Location and access ==
The area is located about 2 miles northwest of Ceres in Bland County, Virginia. There are two trails for access, the Appalachian Trail and the Lynn Camp Creek Trail.

Boundary of Lynn Camp Creek Wilderness Study Area

The Lynn Camp Creek Trail, Forest Trail 6511, is two miles long with trailhead on Forest Service Road 632, accessed by taking VA 625 from Ceres.

A 6.3 mile section of the Appalachian Trail passes through the area, with trailheads on the north at VA 622 and to the south on VA 42.

== Natural history ==
Valleys along streams in the study area contain thick groves of rhododendron with pines and hemlocks. Valley bottoms contain hardwoods, tulip tree, basswood, white ash, red maple, northern red oak, white oak, and cucumber tree while dry ridges are dominated by chestnut oak and scarlet oak. There are also stands of old-growth trees.

Lick Creek contains one of the three populations of the Tennessee Dace, listed as endangered in Virginia.

Lick Creek Natural Area, an 860-acre area created in 1961, borders the wilderness study area on Lynn Camp Creek Mountain.

== Topography ==
Three ridges surround the valleys of Lynn Camp Creek and Lick Creek with elevations ranging from about 2300 feet in the valley bottoms to about 3000 feet on the ridges.

== Management ==
Until Congress makes a decision as to its permanent status, the area is managed by the Forest Service under the same regulations as a Wilderness Area.

There are some regulations to maintain the integrity of the area as a wilderness. For example, motorized equipment, motor vehicles and mountain bikes are prohibited, group size is limited to ten people, and limits are placed on camping.

== See also ==
- List of U.S. Wilderness Areas
- Garden Mountain Cluster
