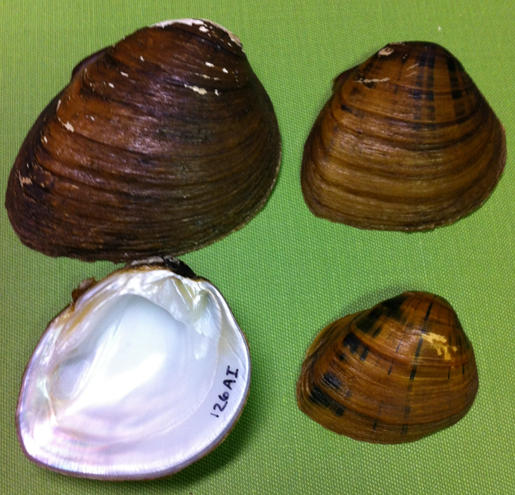
- Pleuronaia dolabelloides

Scientific classification
- Domain: Eukaryota
- Kingdom: Animalia
- Phylum: Mollusca
- Class: Bivalvia
- Order: Unionida
- Family: Unionidae
- Tribe: Pleurobemini
- Genus: Pleuronaia; Frierson, 1927

Synonyms
- Lexingtonia

= Pleuronaia =

Genus of Bivalvia

Pleuronaia is a genus of freshwater mussels, aquatic bivalve mollusks in the family Unionidae, the river mussels. They are native to the United States.

Some members of this genus were formerly included under the now-obsolete name Lexingtonia.

== Species ==
- Pleuronaia barnesiana
- Pleuronaia dolabelloides ("slab-sided naiad")
- Pleuronaia gibberum
