= Hunting Camp Creek Wilderness =

Protected area in Virginia

- IUCN category Ib (wilderness area)
- Location within Virginia Location within the United States
- Location: Bland County Virginia, United States
- Nearest city: Bland, Virginia
- Coordinates: 37.08795°N 81.24977°W
- Area: 8,471 acres (3,428 ha)
- Established: 2009
- Administrator: U.S. Forest Service

The Hunting Camp Creek Wilderness is an area protected by the Eastern Wilderness Act of Congress to maintain its present, natural condition. As part of the wilderness system, it helps to preserve a variety of natural life forms and contributes to a diversity of plant and animal gene pools. Over half of the ecosystems in the United States exist within designated wilderness.

Traversed by the Appalachian Trail, the wilderness spans two remote watersheds, giving the trail one of its wildest stretches in the southern Appalachians with an abundance of wildflowers and birdlife.

The area is part of the Garden Mountain Cluster.

== Location and access ==
Lying five miles west of Bland, Virginia in Bland County, Virginia, the wilderness is bounded on the west by Va 623, on the east by Va 615, on the north by Va 620 and on the northwest by the crest of Garden Mountain. A 9.7 mile section of the Appalachian Trail gives access to the area, extending from the trailhead on Va 615 to the trailhead at Va 623. In addition, there are abandoned logging roads, an old railroad grade, and a two-mile, blue-blazed "Low Water Trail" along Wolf Creek that can be used to explore the area.

Boundary of Hunting Camp Creek Wilderness

The wilderness is bordered by the Garden Mountain Wilderness on the west.

== Natural history ==
Forests species include white oak, tulip poplar, sugar maple, basswood, Frasier magnolia and white pine in valleys of both Hunting Camp Creek and Wolf Creek; and chestnut oak and hickory along the dry ridge crests of Brushy Mountain and Garden Mountain. In addition there are 522 acres of possible Old-growth forest.

The 500-acre Little Wolf Creek Primitive Management Area, is part of the wilderness, with 33 species of birds including 10 species of warblers and two species of orioles. The strikingly, orange-colored, imperiled Tennessee dace occurs in the area, often in ponds below springs.

In Little Wolf Creek Valley, interspersed acidic and alkaline soils support a variety of ferns and flowers, including New York fern, lady fern, Canada violet, wood nettle, foam flower, and black cohosh. In addition, rare roundleaf goldenrod, fringed gentian and Fraser's sedge are found.

Beaver ponds in the wetlands of upper Hunting Camp Creek provide a good habitat for cinnamon fern, red catchfly, Indian physic, columbine, and flame azalea.

== Topography ==
Garden and Brushy Mountains, the principal ridges in the wilderness, are part of the Ridge and Valley section of the central Appalachians, a section marked by ridges of sandstone and shale separated by shale valleys. Steep slopes produce a high density of streams flowing into Hunting Camp Creek and Little Wolf Creek. Laurel Creek flows along the eastern edge of the wilderness.

Elevations range from 2380 feet on Hunting Camp Creek to 4120 feet on Garden Mountain.

The wilderness is on the outer flank of an ancient, domed-shape geologic structure that has eroded to leave only the steep sides of the original rock arch. Burkes Garden, composed of older limestone deep inside the dome, was exposed by the erosion of the dome. The AT, as it travels south along Garden Mountain, offers an unobstructed view across the bowl of Burkes Garden.

== Management ==
Created in 2009, the wilderness now has a size of 8471 acres. It is managed by the U.S. Forest Service as part of the Eastern Divide Ranger District of the George Washington and Jefferson National Forests.

There are some regulations to maintain the integrity of the area. For example, motorized equipment, motor vehicles and mountain bikes are prohibited, group size is limited to ten people, and limits are placed on camping.

== See also ==
- Wilderness
- Eastern Wilderness Act
- Garden Mountain Cluster
