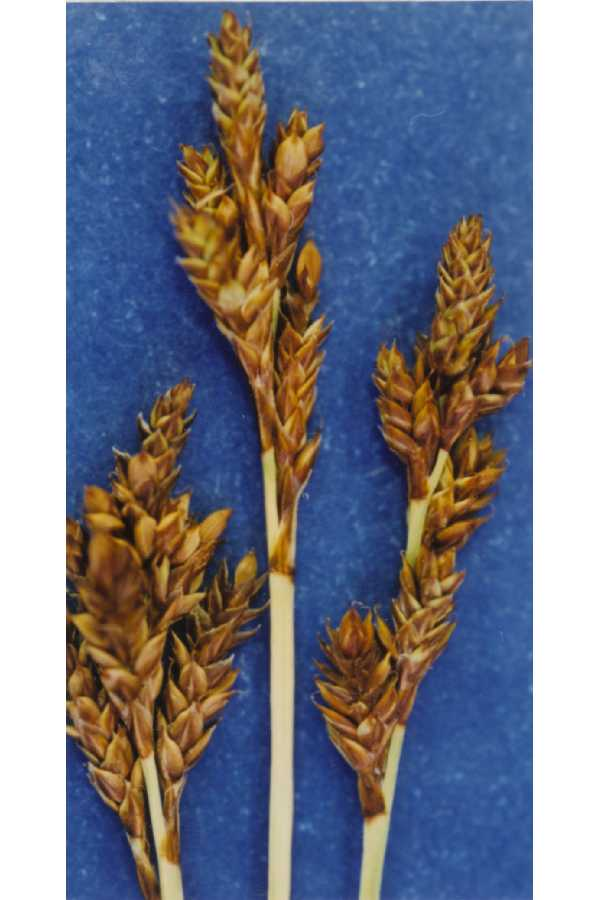

Conservation status
- Least Concern (IUCN 3.1)

Scientific classification
- Kingdom: Plantae
- Clade: Tracheophytes
- Clade: Angiosperms
- Clade: Monocots
- Clade: Commelinids
- Order: Poales
- Family: Cyperaceae
- Genus: Carex
- Subgenus: Carex subg. Vignea
- Section: Carex sect. Glareosae
- Species: C. brunnescens

Binomial name
- Carex brunnescens (Pers.) Poir.

Synonyms
- Carex cuta var. brunnescens Pers.; Carex canescens var. sphaerostachya Tuck.; Carex sphaerostachya (Tuck.) Dewey; Carex brunnescens var. gracilio Britt.; Carex brunnescens var. sphaerostachya (Tuck.) Kük.

= Carex brunnescens =

Species of grass-like plant

Carex brunnescens, the brownish sedge or green bog sedge, is a species of plant in the sedge family (Cyperaceae). It has a circumboreal distribution, and is native to North America and Eurasia. In the United States it is primarily found in the Northeast and Midwest extending south into the Appalachian Mountains, with disjunct populations westward in the Rocky Mountains. It has a wide-ranging natural habitat, is in found in forests, bogs, fens, and rock outcrops.

Carex brunnescens is morphologically variable across its wide range. It has a different morphology when growing in shade vs. sunlight. Shade growing specimens tends to be slender and weak-stemmed with green scales, and sun growing specimens tend to be stiffly erect with brown scales. The degree of variation in this species warrants further taxonomic study.

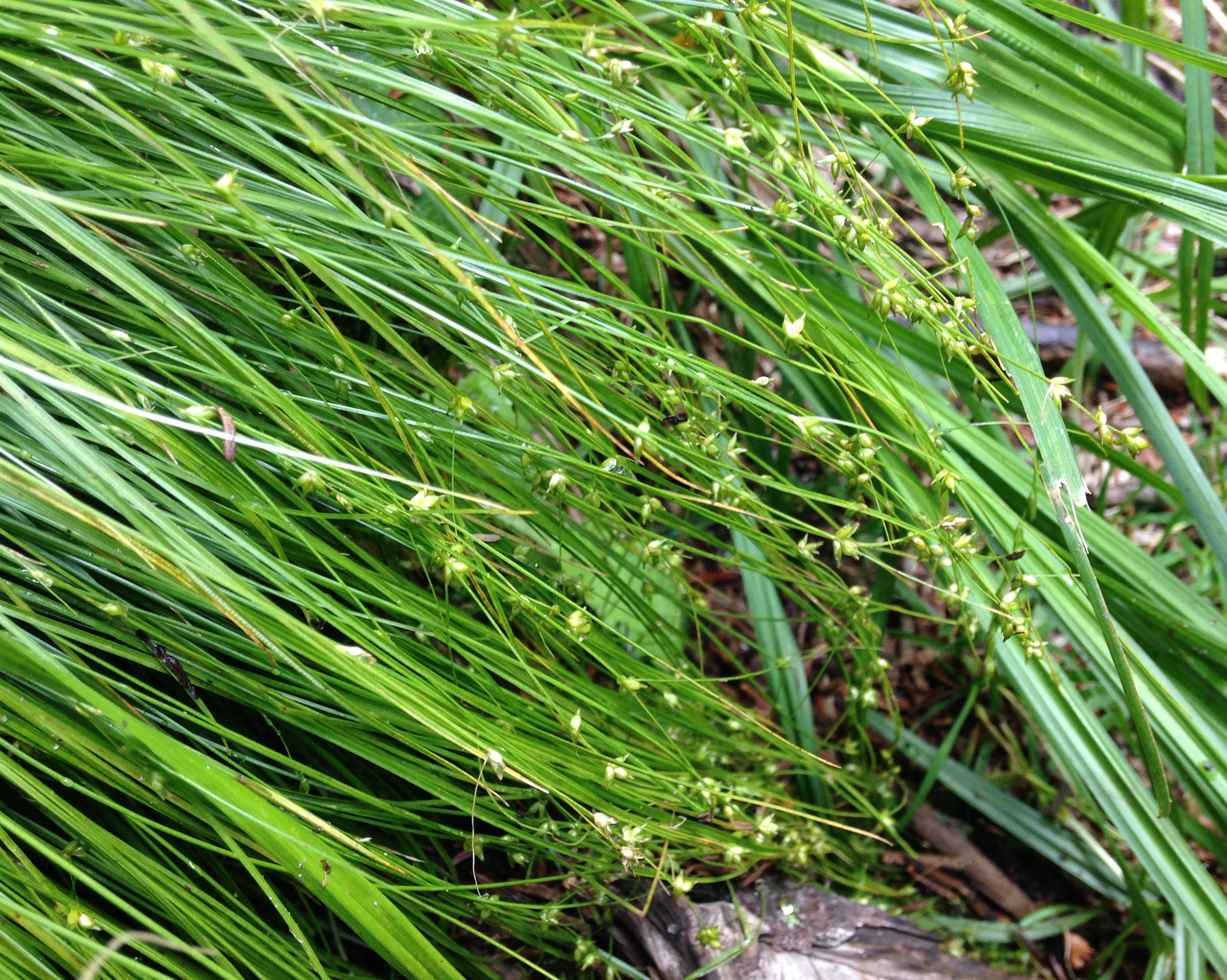
Showing green and arching shade form
