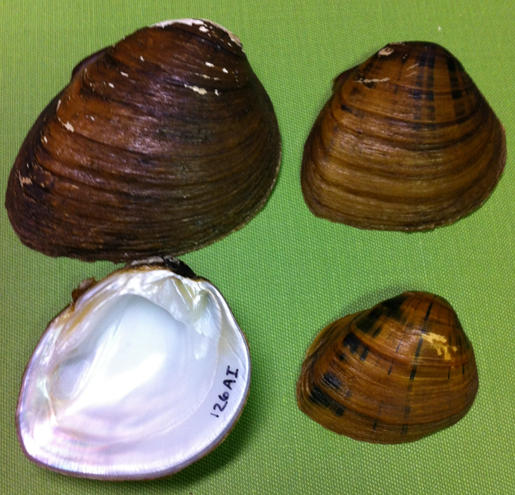

Conservation status
- Endangered (IUCN 3.1)

- Endangered (ESA)

Scientific classification
- Kingdom: Animalia
- Phylum: Mollusca
- Class: Bivalvia
- Order: Unionida
- Family: Unionidae
- Genus: Pleuronaia
- Species: P. dolabelloides

Binomial name
- Pleuronaia dolabelloides (Lea, 1840)

Synonyms
- List: Lexingtonia dolabelloides (Lea, 1840); Lexingtonia dolabelloides subsp. dolabelloides (Lea, 1840); Lexingtonia dolabelloides subsp. conradi (Vanatta, 1915); Unio maculatus Conrad, 1834; Unio dolabelloides Lea, 1840; Unio thorntonii Lea, 1857; Unio mooresianus Lea, 1857; Unio circumactus Lea, 1871; Unio recurvatus Lea, 1871; Unio subglobatus Lea, 1871; Pleurobema conradi Vanatta, 1915; Unio tornhatonii subsp. duckensis de Gregorio, 1914

= Pleuronaia dolabelloides =

Species of bivalve

Pleuronaia dolabelloides, the slab-sided naiad, slab-sided pearly mussel, or slabside pearlymussel, is a species of freshwater mussel, an aquatic bivalve mollusk in the family Unionidae, the river mussels. This species was formerly classified under the genus Lexingtonia.

This species is endemic to the Tennessee River system in the United States. It is currently found in Virginia, Tennessee, Mississippi and Alabama, but has been extirpated from North Carolina and Kentucky. A Pleuronaia species recorded from Georgia has not been established as representing P. dolabelloides.
