= Beartown Wilderness =

Protected area in Virginia, US

- IUCN category Ib (wilderness area)
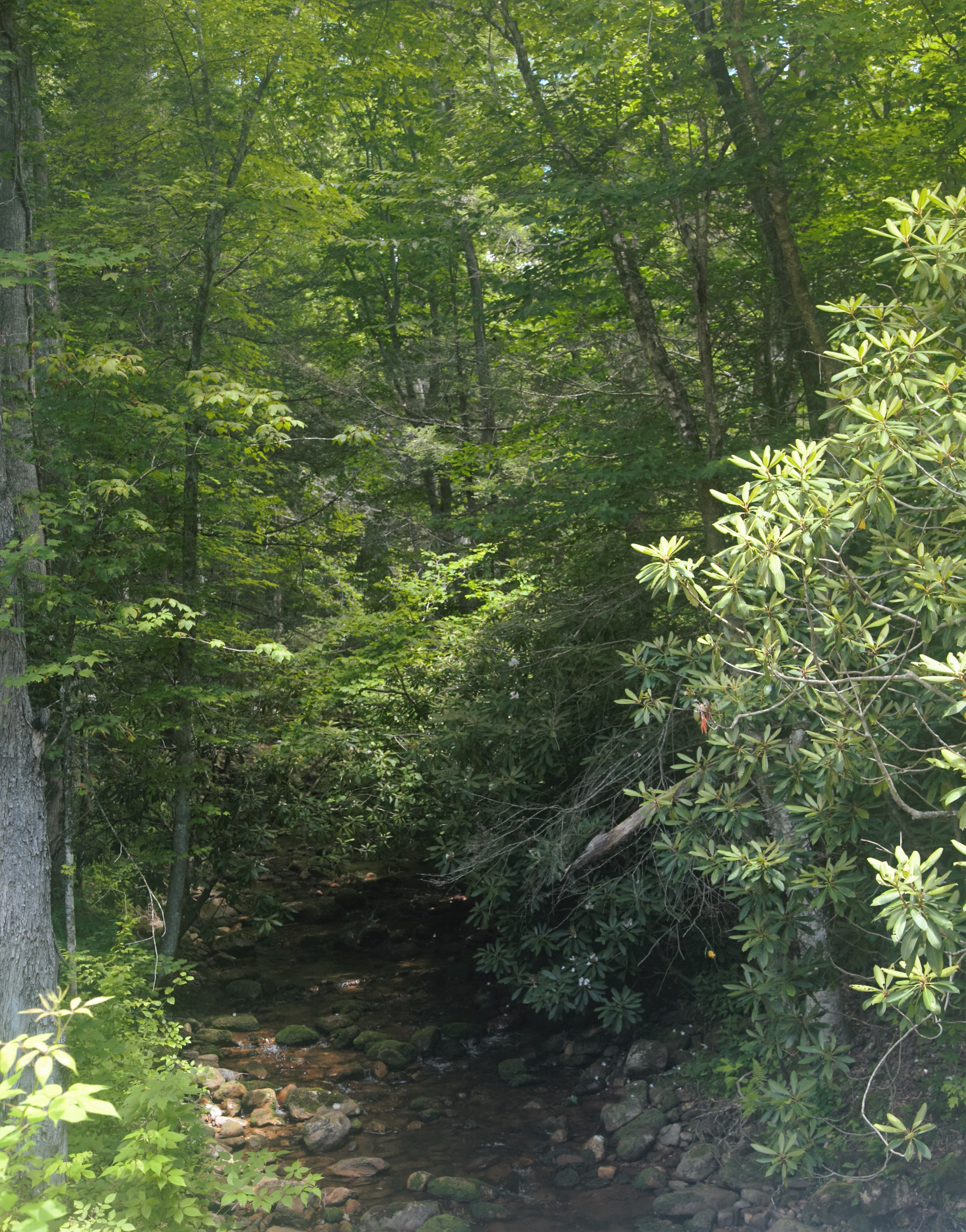
- Roaring Fork at Lick Creek Road

- Location within Virginia Location within the United States
- Location: Virginia, U.S.
- Nearest city: Tazewell, Virginia
- Coordinates: 37.06662°N 81.44242°W
- Area: 5,613 acres (22.72 km^{2})
- Established: 1984
- Governing body: U.S. Forest Service

Beartown Wilderness is a U.S. wilderness area in the Eastern Divide Ranger District of the George Washington and Jefferson National Forests. The Wilderness consists of 5,613 acres (22.72 km^{2}) of land with elevations ranging from 2,400 to 4,800 feet (730 to 1,460 m). It was created from existing National Forest lands in 1984 by the Virginia Wilderness Act of 1984.

With its remote location, steep terrain and thick vegetation, the wilderness is rarely visited. It contains a unique combination of fast flowing streams, rare old-growth communities, sphagnum bogs and outstanding views.

The area is part of the Garden Mountain Cluster.

== Location and Access ==
Lying to the southwest of Burke's Garden, Virginia in Tazewell County, Virginia, the wilderness is bounded on the northwest by Clinch Mountain and on the southeast by Chestnut Ridge.

The Appalachian Trail follows the boundary of the wilderness for about four miles as it passes along Chestnut Ridge from the trailhead on Route 222.

The Roaring Fork Trail, FS 6504, is a 2.3 mile trail following Roaring Fork, with trailhead on Forest Rd 222 that is reached by taking SR 625 from Va 42 at Ceres, Va.

A difficult 8.2 mile roundtrip, overnight-backpack begins at a trailhead on Forest Road 631.

A few logging roads, no longer maintained, allowing access by foot, can be identified by looking at older editions of the USGS topos (Hutchinson Rock) Some of these difficult hikes are:

- Coon Branch, 4 Miles, 1600 foot elevation change, trailhead Forest Service Road 631
- Clinch Mountain Trail, 2.7 miles, 600 foot elevation change, trailhead Coon Branch Trail
- Roaring Fork Connector Trail, 1.7 miles, 150 foot elevation change, trailhead Forest Service Road 631
- Hutchinson Rock Trail, 1.9 miles, 250 foot elevation change, trailhead Roaring Fork Connector Trail

== Natural history ==
An oak-hickory forest dominates the southern border giving way, at higher elevations, to northern hardwoods, spruce and yellow birch. A cove forest in the valley between Clinch Mountain and Chestnut Ridge contains large tuliptrees, Fraser magnolia, cucumber magnolia and basswood . Old growth forest can be found on Redoak Ridge, Barkcamp Branch, the north-facing slope west of Heniger Gap and steep ravines in the midsection of Cove Branch where the rough terrain has offered protection from logging.

A basin running from the headwaters of Cove Branch contains a sphagnum bog and beaver-formed ponds. The basin provides habitat for the rare long stalked holly and beaked dodder. Other flowers in the wilderness include Indian cucumber, alumroot, trillium, and plants such as yellow birch and hobble bush.

The forest provides good habitat for black bear, white-tailed deer, grouse and northern flying squirrel. The forest also contains blackcapped chickadee, red-breasted nuthatch and winter wren, birds more commonly found in more northern forests. The Beartown beetle is not found anywhere else in the world.

== Topography ==
Elevations in the wilderness range from 2400 to 4480 feet, with several peaks over 4000 feet; Clinch Mountain at 4450 feet, Hutchinson Rock at 4480 feet in the far northeast corner and adjacent Chestnut Ridge at 4400 feet.

The principal drainage is Roaring Fork with tributaries Cove Branch, Barkcamp Branch and Coon Branch rapidly descending through the wilderness.

Clinch Mountain is created from shale and sandstone, with some pockets of limestone mixed with the shale and sandstone to form pockets of rich habitat.

== Management ==
The area is managed as a wilderness by the Forest Service through the Eastern Divide Ranger District of the George Washington & Jefferson National Forests.

There are some regulations to maintain the integrity of the area. For example, motorized equipment, motor vehicles and mountain bikes are prohibited, group size is limited to ten people, and limits are placed on camping.

== Cultural History ==
Over the years many airplanes have crashed into Beartown Mountain leaving remnants which can still be seen today, including a WWII-era P-51D Mustang.

== See also ==
- List of U.S. Wilderness Areas
- Garden Mountain Cluster
- Beartown Wilderness Addition A
- Beartown Wilderness Addition B
- Vegetation in Beartown Wilderness
