= Anders Bjørnstad =

Norwegian jazz trumpeter

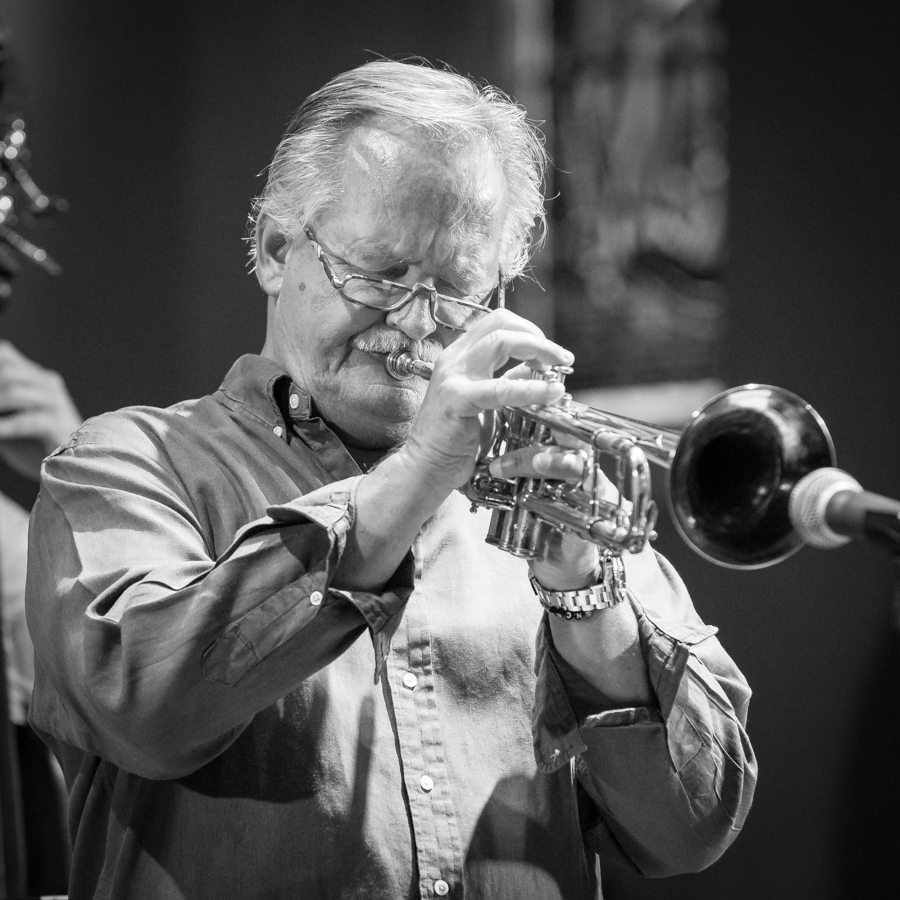
Anders Bjørnstad at Oslo Domkirke during the 2017 Oslo Jazzfestival

Anders Bjørnstad is a Norwegian jazz trumpeter.

== Career ==
Bjørnstad played at jam sessions in Drammen when he was 11 years of age, and between 1960-65 was a member of Papa Dennis Jazzband, first prize winner in the tradband class at amateur Norwegian Championship of Jazz in 1963 and thereafter he played at the 1964 Kongsberg Jazzfestival.

In the mid-1970s he was incorporated into the tradjazz community in Oslo and became a member of the Magnolia Jazz Band in 1974 and Christiania Jazz Band in 1976. In these two popular traditions, he has always been a leading musician and has gained attention with a game characterized by empathy and warmth. With each of the bands he has recorded several albums: 13 with Magnolia Jazz Band (1976 to 2011), 5 with Christiania Jazzband (1978 to 1990). Since the engagement at the 1978 Moldejazz he has played at a number of festivals both in Norway and abroad (also the United States).

In 1981-82 he collaborated on an album with Svein Sundby & Friends, and in 1992 he played on the album «Supertrad». When the tradjazz band «Christiania 12» was formed the same year, he was obvious candidate for the trumpet lineup. In 1995 he recorded both with Christiania 12 and Christiania Jazzband. An album of the Magnolia Jazz Band from 1976 was released in 2004, under the name «Classic Magnolia – Vintage 1976». The same year a new album with Christiania 12, «Happy feet» from 2002-04 was released. Recordings with Magnolia 2003-06 was released on DVD («Magnolia Jazzband celebrating New Orleans Music». In 2007, he participated on the album «Magnolia Jazzband & Topsy Chapman – Live at Oslo Concert Hall» and in 2009 the «Rhythm Crazy» with Christiania 12. The current last album with Magnolia Jazz Band is called «Molde Revisited» and contains recordings from the 2011 Moldejazz.
