= Beartown Wilderness Addition B =

Protected natural area in Virginia, United States

- Location within Virginia
- Location: Tazewell County; Virginia, United States
- Nearest town: Tazewell, Virginia
- Coordinates: 37°2′18″N 81°25′11″W
- Area: 3,060 acres (12.4 km^{2})
- Administrator: U.S. Forest Service

Beartown Wilderness Addition B, a wildland in the George Washington and Jefferson National Forests of western Virginia, has been recognized by the Wilderness Society as a special place worthy of protection from logging and road construction. The Wilderness Society has designated the area as a "Mountain Treasure". The area. adjacent to the Beartown Wilderness, is proposed as an addition to the wilderness.

The Forest Service classifies about 82 percent of the area as having high scenic integrity. It is easily accessed on a section of the Appalachian Trail, passing along a ridge with excellent views of Burke’s Garden.

The area is part of the Garden Mountain Cluster.

== Location and access ==
The area is located in the Appalachian Mountains of Southwestern Virginia east of Va 16, north of Beartown Wilderness and about 7 miles southeast of Tazewell, Virginia.

The Appalachian Trail passes through the area for 4.7 miles. From Forest Road 222, it goes in a northerly direction to Chestnut Ridge, then follows the ridge along the northeast side of the area to reach the Chestnut Knob shelter on the northern side The Chestnut Knob shelter was a forest warden cabin before 1994 when the Forest Service and a group of volunteers converted it to a fully enclosed shelter. An intermittent water supply is 0.2 miles away.

Vehicle access from the west is gained by taking Va 16 to Forest Road 222. Access from the north and east is gained from VA 42 at Ceres where VA 625 goes north to connect with Forest Road 222. Forest Road 222 passes along the southern boundary.

Bear Hollow Road, VA 631, extends from Forest Road 222 for 1.7 miles. At this point the road is gated, but hikers can continue on the Roaring Fork Trail, Forest Trail 6504, for 2.3 miles crossing Beartown Wilderness Addition B into the Beartown Wilderness to reach Roaring Fork.

The area has about 10 to 16 miles of abandoned logging roads and informal trails still passable because of illegal ATV use. These routes are busy with foot and ATV traffic, especially during hunting season.

Old logging roads and railroad grades can be located by consulting the historical topographic maps available from the United States Geological Survey (USGS). The wild area is covered by USGS topographic map Hutcheson Rock.

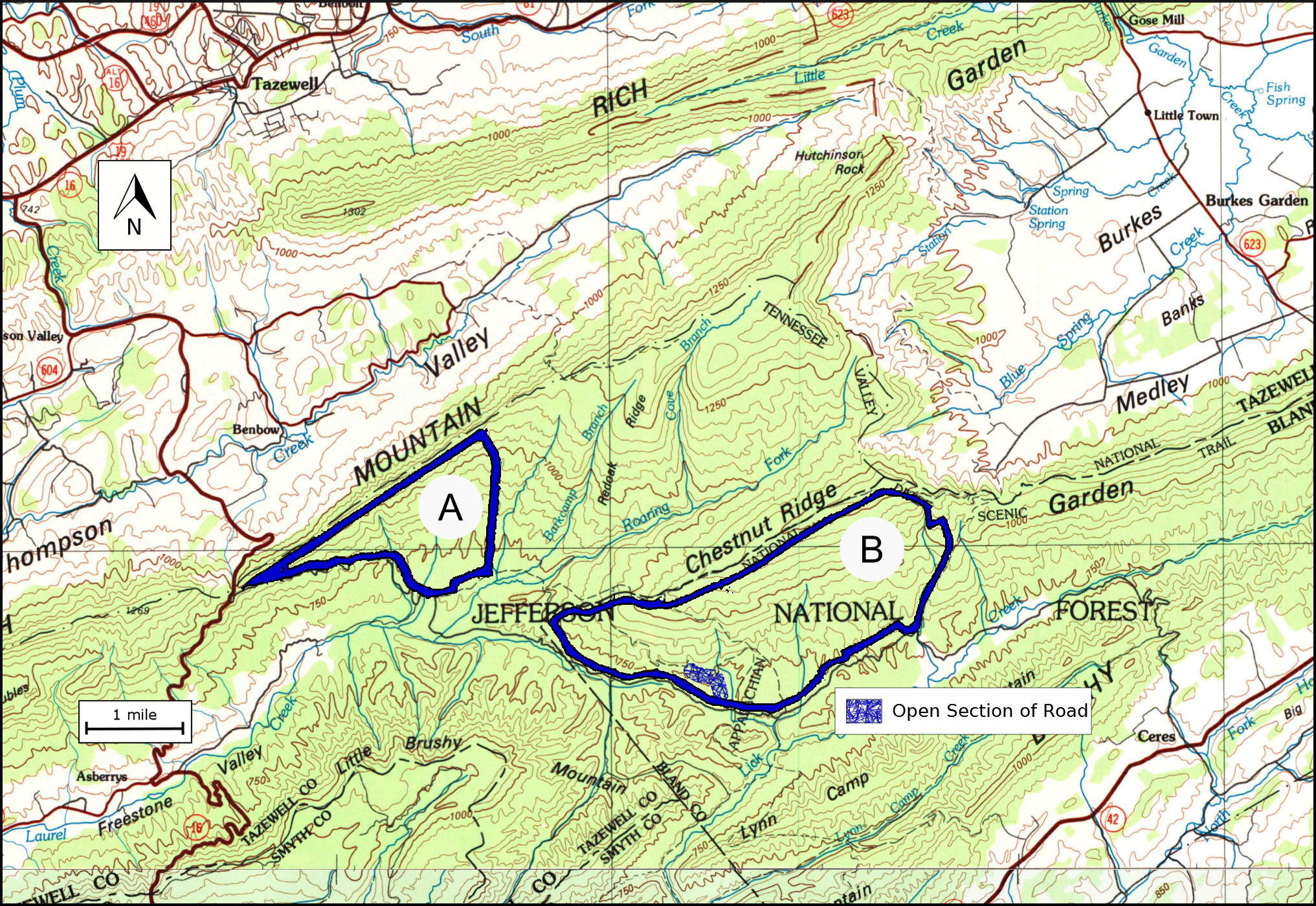
Boundaries of the Beartown Wilderness Additions. Beartown Wilderness Addition B, as identified by the Wilderness Society, is on the right.

The boundary of the wildland as determined by the Wilderness Society is shown in the adjacent map. Additional roads and trails in the vicinity are given on National Geographic Maps 787 (Blacksburg, New River Valley, Trails Illustrated Hiking Maps, 787). A great variety of information, including topographic maps, aerial views, satellite data and weather information, is obtained by selecting the link with the wild land's coordinates in the upper right of this page.

== Natural history ==
The area is part of the Central Appalachian Broadleaf Coniferous Forest-Meadow Province. Most of the vegetation is broadleaf. Yellow poplar, northern red oak, white oak, basswood, cucumber tree, white ash, eastern hemlock and red maple are found in colluvial drainages, toeslopes and along flood plains of small to medium-sized streams. White oak, northern red oak, and hickory dominate on the north and west, while chestnut oak, scarlet oak and yellow pine are found on the north and west.

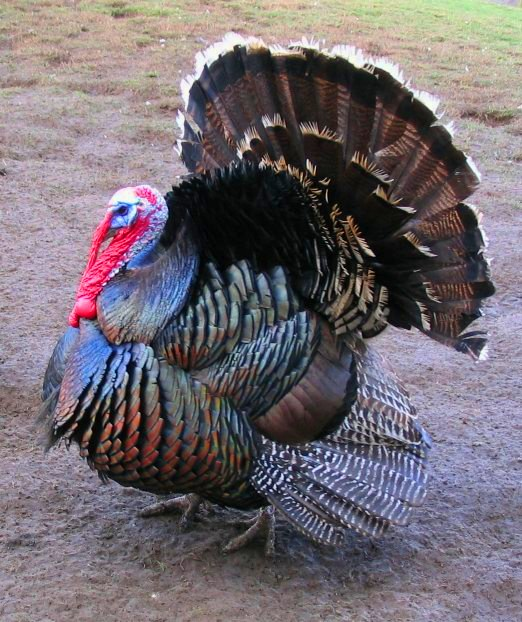
American Turkey

Turkey and bear are the featured species in the area. Wildlife populations are supported by the presence of two artificial waterholes. With time, the waterholes are gaining a natural appearance.

Arthrophycus tracks can be found on gray sandstone along the Appalchain Trail. Looking like long, finger shaped branches, they are the remains of an ancient worm trail.

The varied topography of the area includes a wide variety of ecological types with hot, dry, windswept ridges to cool, moist coves. Most of the area is in the Dry Mesic Oak ecological community type.

The area contains about 307 acres of potential old growth forest. These acres include the community types Dry and Dry-Mesic Oak-Pine(4 acres), Dry Mesic Oak (266 acres) and Mixed and Western Mesophytic (37 acres).

== Topography ==
The wildland is part of the Ridge and Valley Subsection of the Northern Ridge and Valley Ecosystem Section. Ridges, composed of sandstone and shale, run northeast–southwest, with parallel valleys created from limestone or shale.

The area is on the south-eastern side of Chestnut Ridge. The lowest elevation of 2320 feet is found along the southern boundary, and the high elevation of 4400 feet is found at a point on Chestnut Knob on the Bland and Tazewell County line. The area includes the headwaters of several streams flowing into Lick Creek and Laurel Creek.

== Forest Service management ==
The Forest Service has conducted a survey of their lands to determine the potential for wilderness designation. Wilderness designation provides a high degree of protection from development. The areas that were found suitable are referred to as inventoried roadless areas. Later a Roadless Rule was adopted that limited road construction in these areas. The rule provided some degree of protection by reducing the negative environmental impact of road construction and thus promoting the conservation of roadless areas. Beartown Wilderness Addition B was inventoried in the roadless area review, and therefore protected from possible road construction and timber sales.

Four special use permits authorize spring boxes and waterlines from Laurel Branch to private property with cabins near the boundary of the area. There is also a road use authorization for access to a private inholding. The top of Chestnut Ridge has grassy open areas that were excluded from the area so as to allow mowing by Appalachian Trail maintaining clubs. With the decline in funding for Forest Service maintenance, the maintaining clubs are providing this service as their resources allow.

The area has a history of illegal vehicle use, but much of it has been eliminated by law enforcement.

The area, owned by the National Park Service as part of the Appalachian Trail corridor, is managed by the Forest Service under a Memorandum of Understanding.

There are 671 acres of privately owned mineral rights in the area.

The Forest Service classifies areas under their management by a recreational opportunity setting that informs visitors of the diverse range of opportunities available in the forest. Much or the area is designated "Backcountry Nonmotorized", with an area on the west prescribed as "Black Bear Habitat", and some inclusions of "Old Growth with Disturbance".

== Cultural History ==
The remains of an old homesite can be seen next to the Appalachian Trail on Chestnut Ridge. There is also a prehistoric site within the area.

== See also ==
- Garden Mountain Cluster
- Natural Communities
- Beartown Wilderness
