= Svenn Erik Bjørnstad =

Norwegian ice hockey player

Svenn Erik Bjørnstad (born 4 January 1971) is a former Norwegian ice hockey player. He was born in Oslo. He played for the Norwegian national ice hockey team at the 1994 Winter Olympics.
