= Pleuronaia barnesiana =

Conservation status
- Least Concern (IUCN 3.1)

- Imperiled (NatureServe)

Scientific classification
- Kingdom: Animalia
- Phylum: Mollusca
- Class: Bivalvia
- Order: Unionida
- Family: Unionidae
- Genus: Pleuronaia
- Species: P. barnesiana

Binomial name
- Pleuronaia barnesiana (I. Lea, 1838)

Species of bivalve

Pleuronaia barnesiana is a species of bivalve in the family Unionidae, common name Tennessee Pigtoe. It is endemic to the United States.
