= Cambarus hatfieldi =

Scientific classification
- Kingdom: Animalia
- Phylum: Arthropoda
- Clade: Pancrustacea
- Class: Malacostraca
- Order: Decapoda
- Suborder: Pleocyemata
- Family: Cambaridae
- Genus: Cambarus
- Species: C. hatfieldi

Binomial name
- Cambarus hatfieldi Loughman, Fagundo, Lau, Welsh & Thoma, 2013

Species of crayfish

Cambarus hatfieldi (common name Tug Valley crayfish) is a species of crayfish.

== Name ==
Biologists from the University of West Virginia named this species inspired by the Hatfield-McCoy feud. One of the scientists, Zachary Loughman, said this:

Since this is the same region of the famous Hatfield and McCoy rivalry, we thought it was only fitting to name the animal Cambarus hatfieldi, especially since the majority of its range occurs in West Virginia.

== Taxonomy ==
The species was originally thought to be a disjunct population of Cambarus sciotensis.

== Morphology ==
The species can reach sexual maturity under the age of 2 years.

Juvenile C. hatfieldi appear to be usually brown. Adults are still usually brown, but can come in variations of grey. Adults also have blue and green on their legs, as well of parts of their abdomens and cephalothorax.

== Habitat and distribution ==
The species is endemic to the United States. It is present in the U.S. states of Virginia, West Virginia, and Kentucky.

The species resides in freshwater.

The species prefers to reside under slab boulders. But woody and leaf debris will do if boulders are not present.
