= Beartown Wilderness Addition A =

Protected natural area in Virginia, United States

- Location within Virginia
- Location: Tazewell County; Virginia, United States
- Nearest town: Tazewell, Virginia
- Coordinates: 37°3′13″N 81°28′33″W
- Area: 1,369 acres (5.54 km^{2})
- Administrator: U.S. Forest Service

Beartown Wilderness Addition A, a wildland in the George Washington and Jefferson National Forests of western Virginia, has been recognized by the Wilderness Society as a special place worthy of protection from logging and road construction. The Wilderness Society has designated the area as a "Mountain Treasure". The area adjacent to the Beartown Wilderness, is proposed as an addition to the wilderness.

An area in a remote location, the Forest Service has classified it as possessing high scenic integrity with a steep and rugged terrain offering a challenge for those practicing orienteering or backcountry camping.

The area is part of the Garden Mountain Cluster.

== Location and access ==
The area is located in the Appalachian Mountains of Southwestern Virginia east of Va 16, west of Beartown Wilderness and about 6 miles south of Tazewell, Virginia.

The area has no improved or unimproved roads. However, there are about three to five miles of informal trails and logging roads which are passable. Old logging roads and railroad grades can be located by consulting the historical topographic maps available from the United States Geological Survey (USGS). The wild area is covered by USGS topographic maps Hutcheson Rock and Tazewell South.

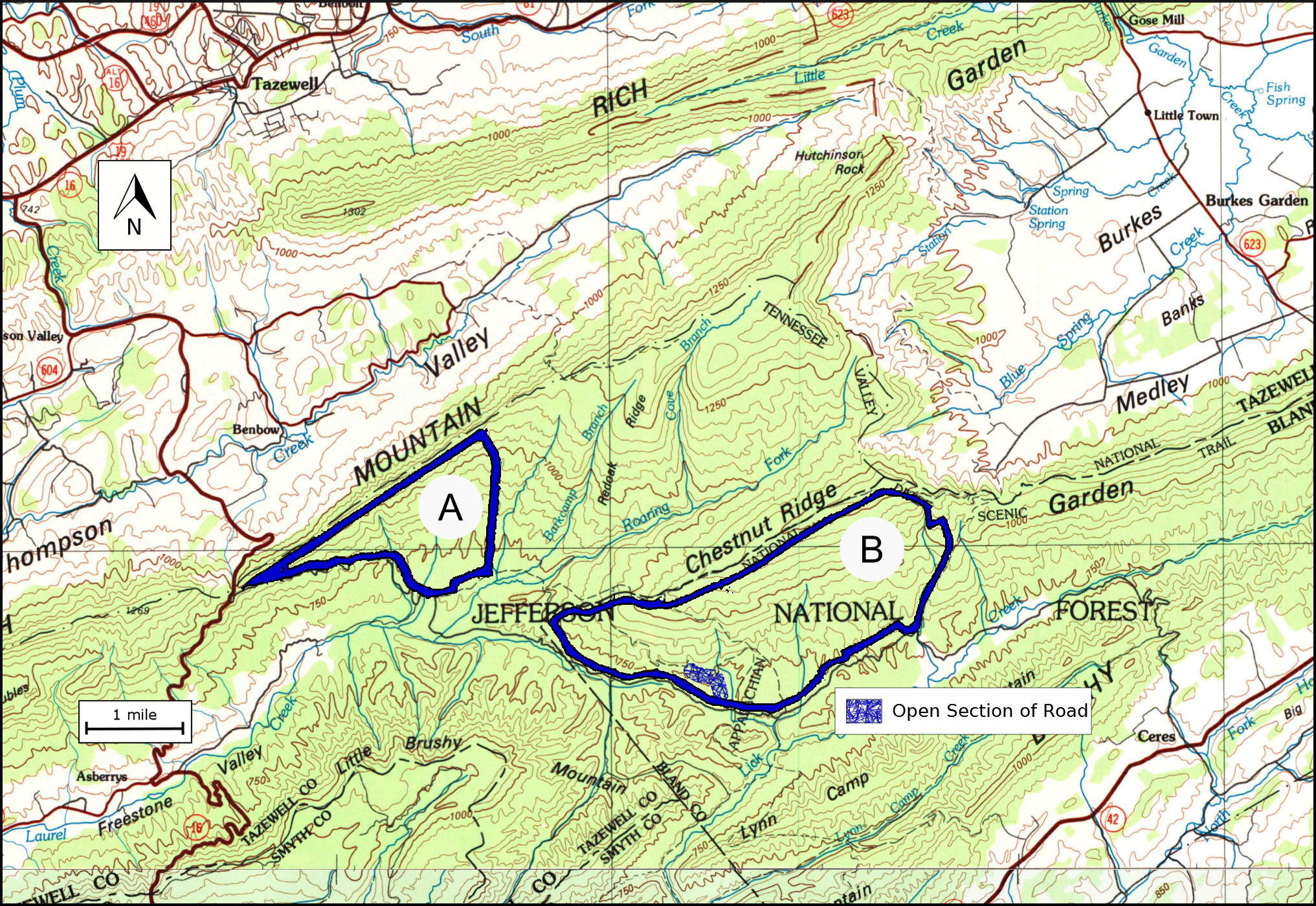
Boundaries of the Beartown Wilderness Additions. Beartown Wilderness Addition A, as identified by the Wilderness Society, is on the left.

The boundary of the wildland as determined by the Wilderness Society is shown in the adjacent map. Additional roads and trails in the vicinity are given on National Geographic Maps 787 (Blacksburg, New River Valley, Trails Illustrated Hiking Maps, 787). A great variety of information, including topographic maps, aerial views, satellite data and weather information, is obtained by selecting the link with the wild land's coordinates in the upper right of this page.

== Natural history ==
The area is part of the Central Appalachian Broadleaf Coniferous Forest-Meadow Province. Yellow poplar, northern red oak, white oak, basswood, cucumber tree, white ash, eastern hemlock and red maple are found in colluvial drainages, toeslopes and along flood plains of small to medium-sized streams. White oak, northern red oak, and hickory dominate on the north and west, while chestnut oak, scarlet oak and yellow pine are found on ridgetops and exposed sites.

The area contains about 285 acres of potential old growth forest.

Most of the area is in the Dry Mesic Oak ecological community type.

The varied topography of the area includes a wide variety of ecological types with hot, dry, windswept ridges to cool, moist coves.

== Topography ==
The wildland is part of the Ridge and Valley Subsection of the Northern Ridge and Valley Ecosystem Section. Ridges, composed of sandstone and shale, run northeast–southwest, with parallel valleys created from limestone or shale.

The area is on the south side of Clinch Mountain where the mountain ends, making a change into a breached, dome-shaped geologic structure called Burkes Garden. The lowest elevation of 2320 feet is found along the southern boundary, and the high elevation of 3800 feet is found at a point on the north on the crest of Clinch Mountain.

The area includes the headwaters of Roaring Fork and Laurel Creek. Roaring Fork is a tributary of Laurel Creek, which drains into the North Fork Holston River. The creek is canoeable from the point where it flows along VA 601 near Asberrys Virginia

== Forest Service management ==
The Forest Service has conducted a survey of their lands to determine the potential for wilderness designation. Wilderness designation provides a high degree of protection from development. The areas that were found suitable are referred to as inventoried roadless areas. Later a Roadless Rule was adopted that limited road construction in these areas. The rule provided some degree of protection by reducing the negative environmental impact of road construction and thus promoting the conservation of roadless areas. Beartown Wilderness Addition A was inventoried in the roadless area review, and therefore protected from possible road construction and timber sales.

The area includes 1246 acres of land with the ownership of subsurface mineral in private hands.

The forest service classifies areas under their management by a recreational opportunity setting that informs visitors of the diverse range of opportunities available in the forest. The area is designated "Backcountry—Natural Process", the strongest level of protection for a backcountry area.

== See also ==
- Garden Mountain Cluster
- Natural Communities
- Beartown Wilderness
