= Shield fern =

Shield fern is a common name for ferns in several genera and may refer to:

- Dryopteris
- Lastreopsis
- Polystichum
- Thelypteris
