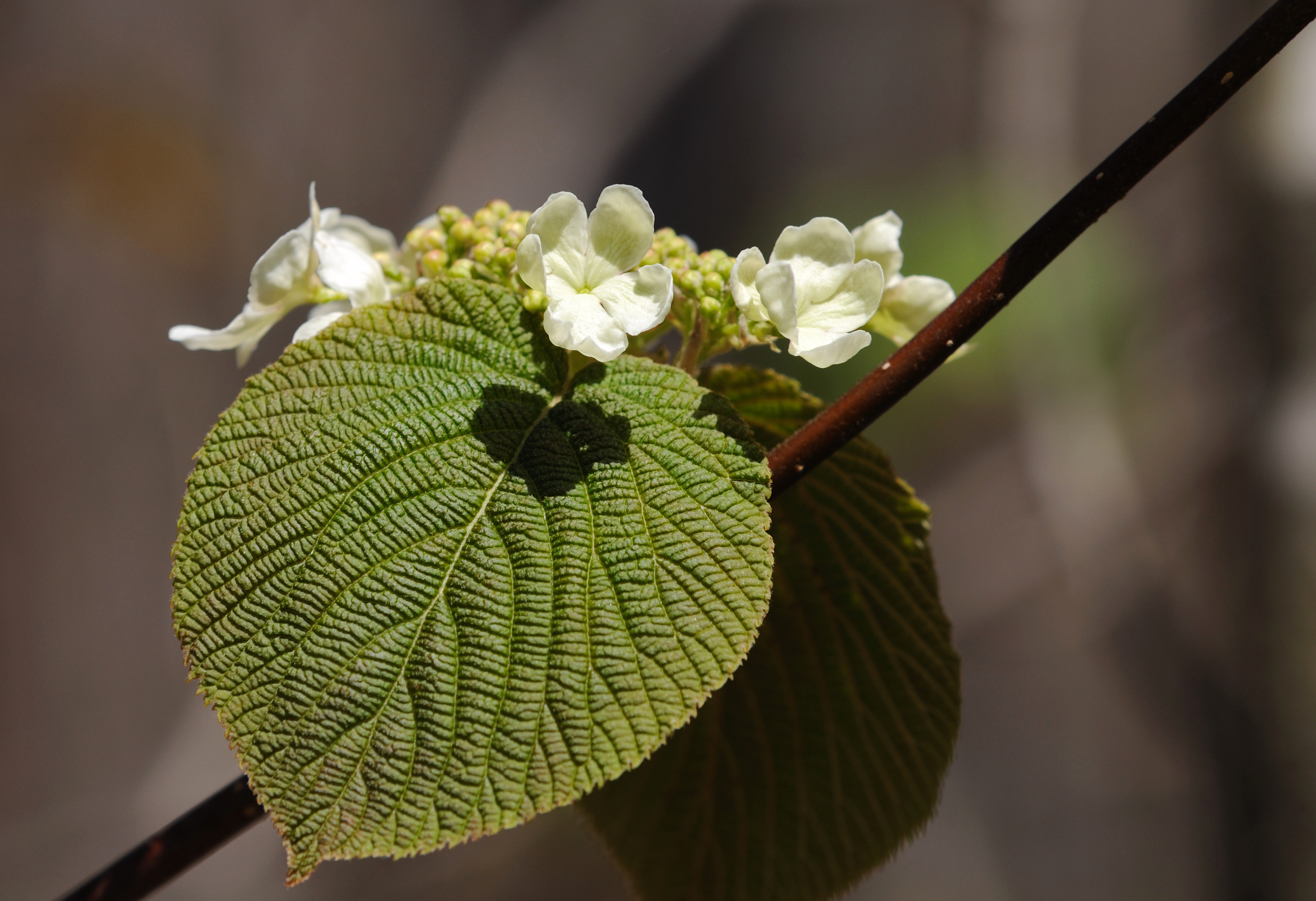

Scientific classification
- Kingdom: Plantae
- Clade: Embryophytes
- Clade: Tracheophytes
- Clade: Spermatophytes
- Clade: Angiosperms
- Clade: Eudicots
- Clade: Asterids
- Order: Dipsacales
- Family: Viburnaceae
- Genus: Viburnum
- Species: V. lantanoides

Binomial name
- Viburnum lantanoides Michx.

Synonyms
- Viburnum alnifolium Marshall

= Viburnum lantanoides =

Species of flowering plant

Viburnum lantanoides (commonly known as hobble-bush, witch-hobble, alder-leaved viburnum, American wayfaring tree, and moosewood) is a perennial shrub of the family Viburnaceae (formerly in the Caprifoliaceae), growing 2–4 meters (6.6–13.1 ft) high with pendulous branches that take root where they touch the ground. These rooted branches form obstacles which easily trip (or hobble) walkers – hence the common name.

The shrub forms large clusters of white to pink flowers in May–June. The flowers on the outer edge of the clusters are much larger (3–5 cm across). The whole cluster is typically 10 cm across. It has large, cardioid leaves which are serrate, 10–20 cm long. The bark is gray-brown and warty and the fruit is a red drupe, which turns to black when ripe.

The flowers provide nectar for the Celastrina ladon (Spring Azure) butterfly. Mammals and birds feed on its fruit, twigs, and leaves. The large showy flowers along the edge of the cluster are sterile, while the small inner flowers have both male and female parts.

== Distribution and habitat ==
Viburnum lantanoides is found in the eastern U.S. and Canada from Georgia to the Canadian Maritimes. It grows in rich, moist acidic woods, stream banks, and swamps.

== Uses ==
The fruits can be eaten raw or made into jelly.

== Gallery ==
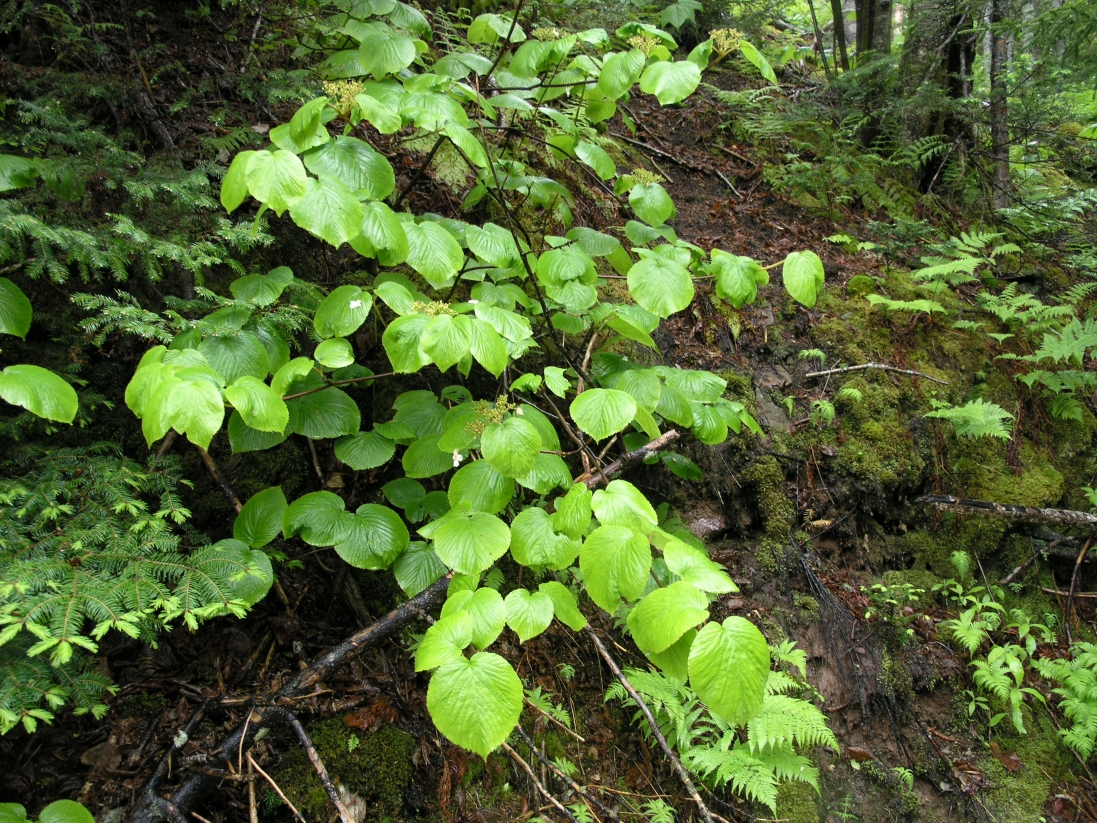
Viburnum lantanoides in mixed northern forest of Picea rubens (red spruce) and Betula alleghaniensis (yellow birch). Fundy National Park, New Brunswick, Canada.

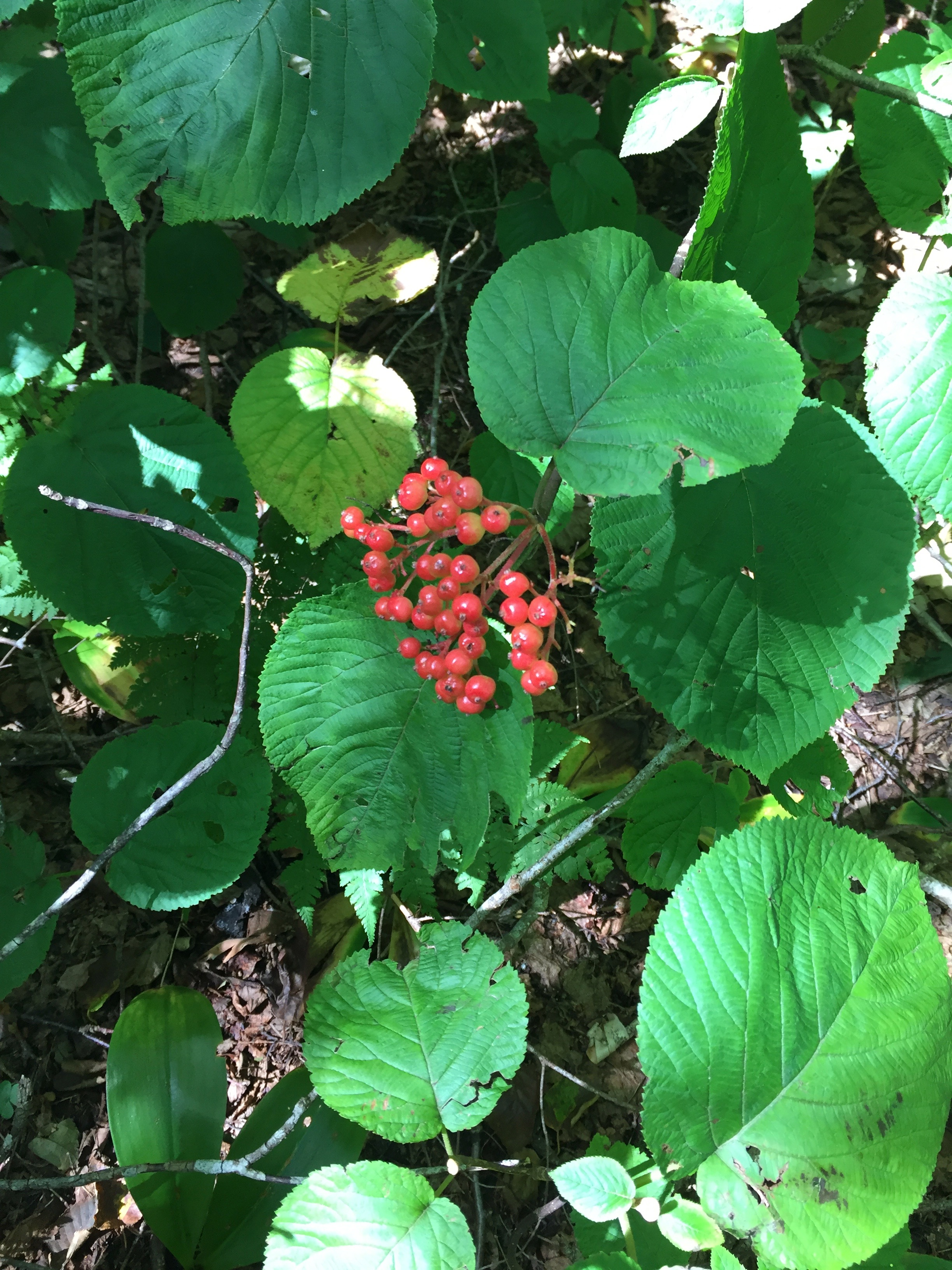
Viburnum lantanoides in September, near Duxbury, Vermont, U.S.A.

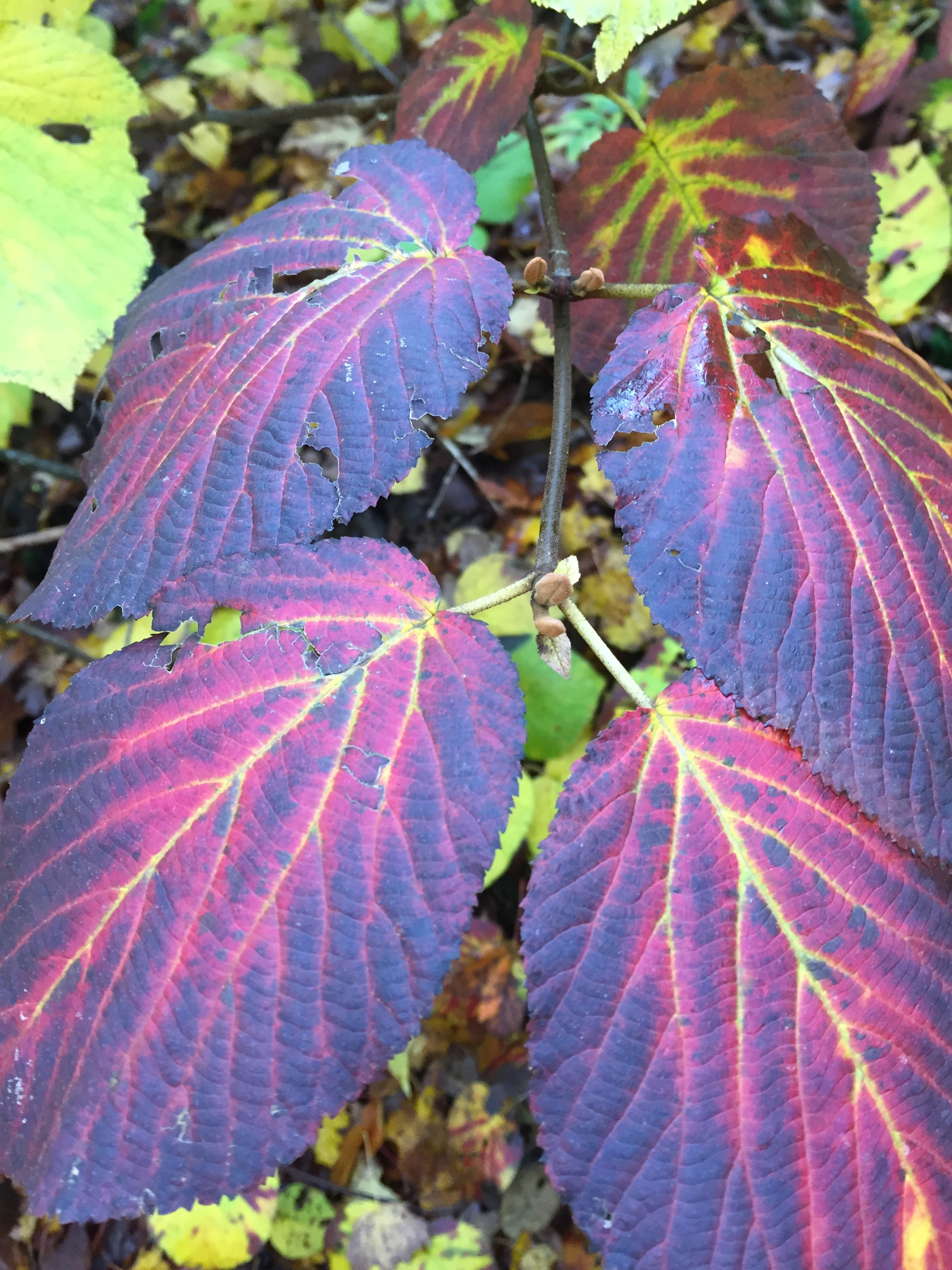
Viburnum lantanoides in October, near Huntington, Vermont, U.S.A.
