= Appalachian–Blue Ridge forests =

Temperate broadleaf and mixed forests ecoregion of the United States

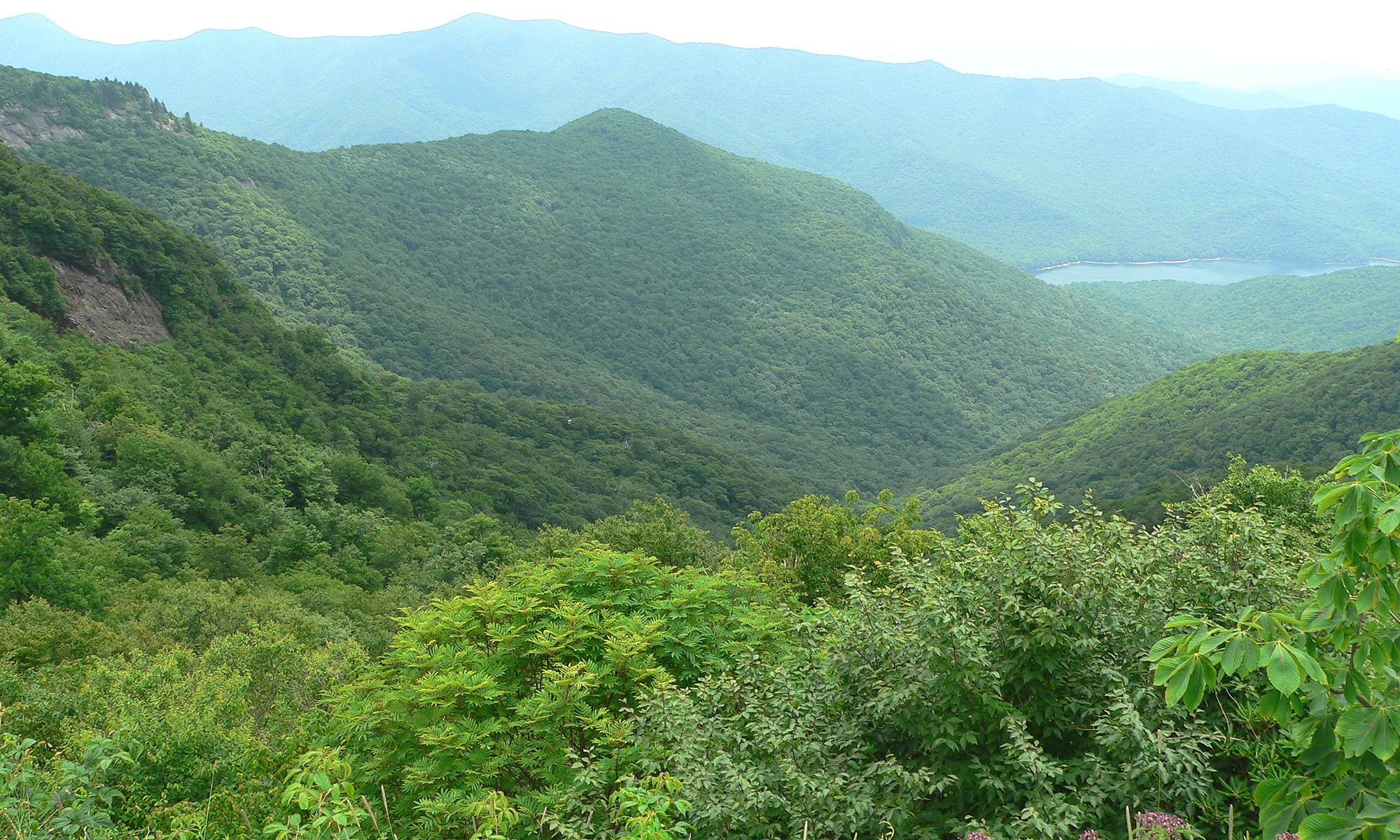
- View from the Blue Ridge Parkway in North Carolina

Ecology
- Realm: Nearctic
- Biome: Temperate broadleaf and mixed forests
- Borders: Northeastern coastal forests; Allegheny Highlands forests; Appalachian mixed mesophytic forests; Southeastern mixed forests
- Bird species: 194
- Mammal species: 73

Geography
- Area: 159,300 km^{2} (61,500 mi^{2})
- Country: United States
- States: List: Pennsylvania; New York; New Jersey; Maryland; Virginia; West Virginia; North Carolina; South Carolina; Georgia; Alabama; Tennessee
- Climate type: Humid continental (Dfb), humid subtropical (Cfa), and oceanic climate (Cfb)

Conservation
- Habitat loss: 27.1%
- Protected: 18.6%

The Appalachian–Blue Ridge forests are an ecoregion in the Temperate broadleaf and mixed forests Biome, in the Eastern United States. The ecoregion is located in the central and southern Appalachian Mountains, including the Ridge-and-Valley Appalachians and the Blue Ridge Mountains. It covers an area of about 61,500 square miles (159,000 km^{2}) in: northeast Alabama and Georgia, northwest South Carolina, eastern Tennessee, western North Carolina, Virginia, Maryland, and central West Virginia and Pennsylvania; and small extensions into Kentucky, New Jersey, and New York.

They are one of the world's richest temperate deciduous forests in terms of biodiversity; there are an unusually high number of species of both flora and fauna, as well as a high number of endemic species. The reasons for this are the long-term geologic stability of the region, its long ridges and valleys which serve both as barrier and corridors, and their general north-south alignment which allowed habitats to shift southward during ice ages. The mountains also contain a large variety of diverse landscapes, microclimates and soils all constituting microhabitats allowing many refugia areas and relict species to survive and thrive.

== Climate ==
The climate varies from humid continental in the north to humid subtropical in the south. Summers are hot at lower elevations and warm at higher elevations. Winters are cold at higher elevations and cool at lower elevations.

== Flora ==
In terms of biodiversity, the only comparable temperate deciduous forest regions in the world are in central China, Japan, and in the Caucasus Mountains. Both the Appalachians (along with the neighbouring Appalachian mixed mesophytic forests ecoregion) and central China contain relict habitats of an ancient forest that was once widespread over the Northern Hemisphere. There are species, genera, and families of plants that occur only in these two locations. The Great Smoky Mountains are particularly rich in biodiversity.

The Appalachians are home to 158 different species of tree, more than anywhere else in North America. There are two main types of forest: deciduous oak forest at low elevations (between 250m and 1350m), and coniferous spruce-fir forest above that. Until the 1930s the oaks were mixed with American chestnut, but these were largely wiped out by the chestnut blight fungus by the middle of the 20th century. The American Sycamore (Platanus occidentalis) is also found in these areas.

=== Cove forests ===
Cove forests occur in coves and on low north- and east-facing slopes in the southern Blue Ridge and central Appalachian Mountains. They are among the most biologically diverse ecosystems in the country. Typical trees of these forests are sugar maple (Acer saccharum), American beech (Fagus grandifolia), eastern hemlock (Tsuga canadensis), Carolina silverbell (Halesia tetraptera), tulip poplar (Liriodendron tulipifera), red maple (Acer rubrum), white oak (Quercus alba), northern red oak (Quercus rubra), yellow birch (Betula alleghaniensis), yellow buckeye (Aesculus flava), and basswood (Tilia americana). Oaks gain numbers on drier sites.

=== Low-elevation pine forests ===
Southern Appalachian low-elevation pine forests occur on a variety of topographic and landscape positions, including ridgetops, upper- and mid-slopes, and in lower elevations (generally below 2,300 feet (700 m)) such as mountain valleys. These forests are dominated by shortleaf pine (Pinus echinata) and Virginia pine (Pinus virginiana). Pitch pine (Pinus rigida) may sometimes be present. Hardwoods are sometimes abundant, especially dry-site oaks such as southern red oak (Quercus falcata), chestnut oak (Quercus montana), and scarlet oak (Quercus coccinea), but also pignut hickory (Carya glabra), red maple (Acer rubrum), and others. The shrub layer may be well-developed, with hillside blueberry (Vaccinium pallidum), black huckleberry (Gaylussacia baccata), or other acid-tolerant species most characteristic. Herbs are usually sparse but may include narrowleaf silkgrass (Pityopsis graminifolia) and goat-rue (Tephrosia virginiana).

=== Oak forests ===
Southern Appalachian oak forests, widespread in the southeastern United States, occur on dry, upland sites on southern and western aspects and ridgetops. The composition of these forests varies throughout their range but often includes chestnut oak (Quercus montana), northern red oak (Quercus rubra), eastern black oak (Quercus velutina), white oak, (Quercus alba), and scarlet oak (Quercus coccinea). Hickories such as bitternut (Carya cordiformis), shagbark (Carya ovata), and mockernut (Carya tomentosa), are found here, as are black tupelo (Nyssa sylvatica), red maple (Acer rubrum), white pine (Pinus strobus), and white ash (Fraxinus americana).

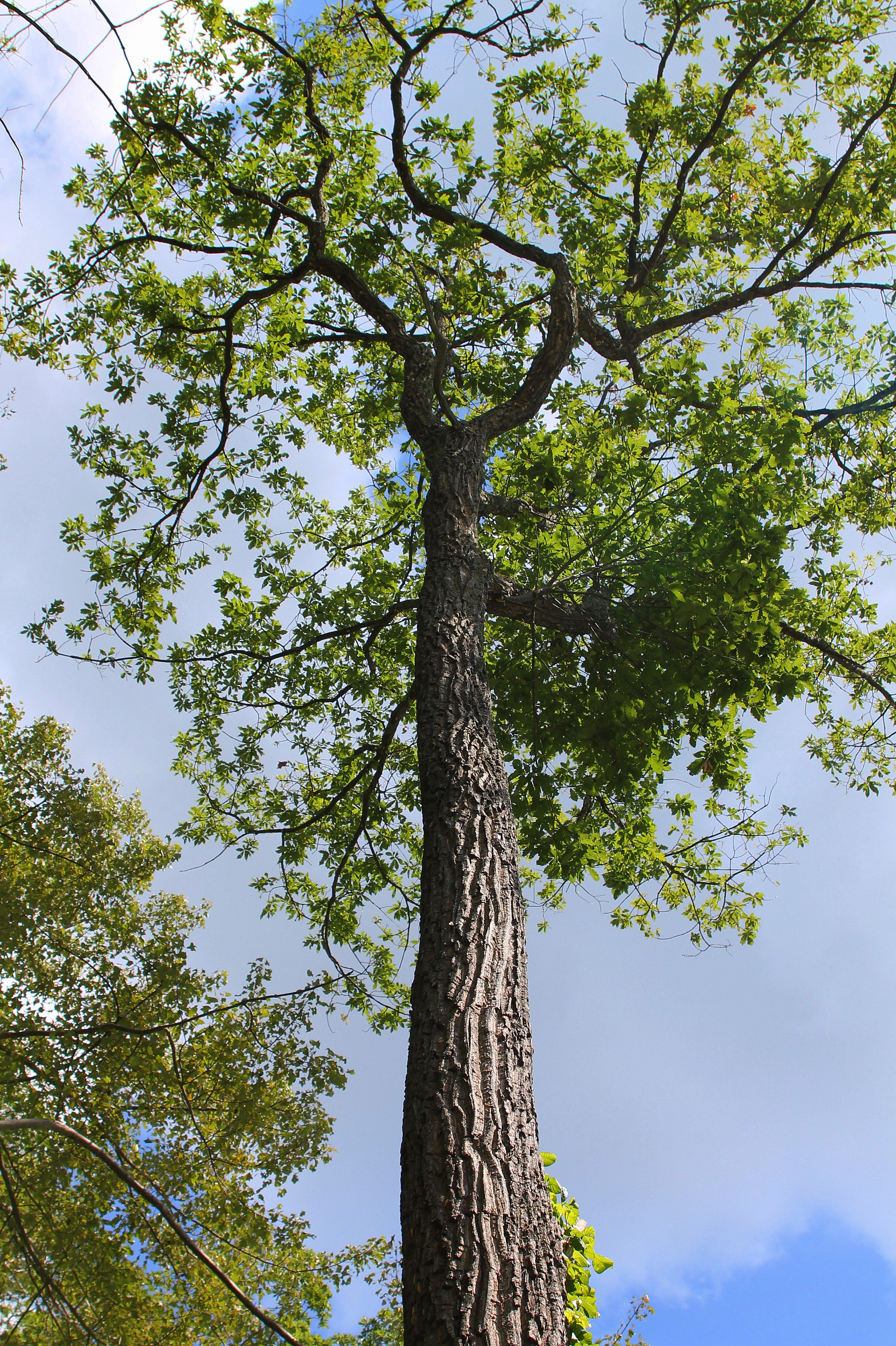
Quercus montana

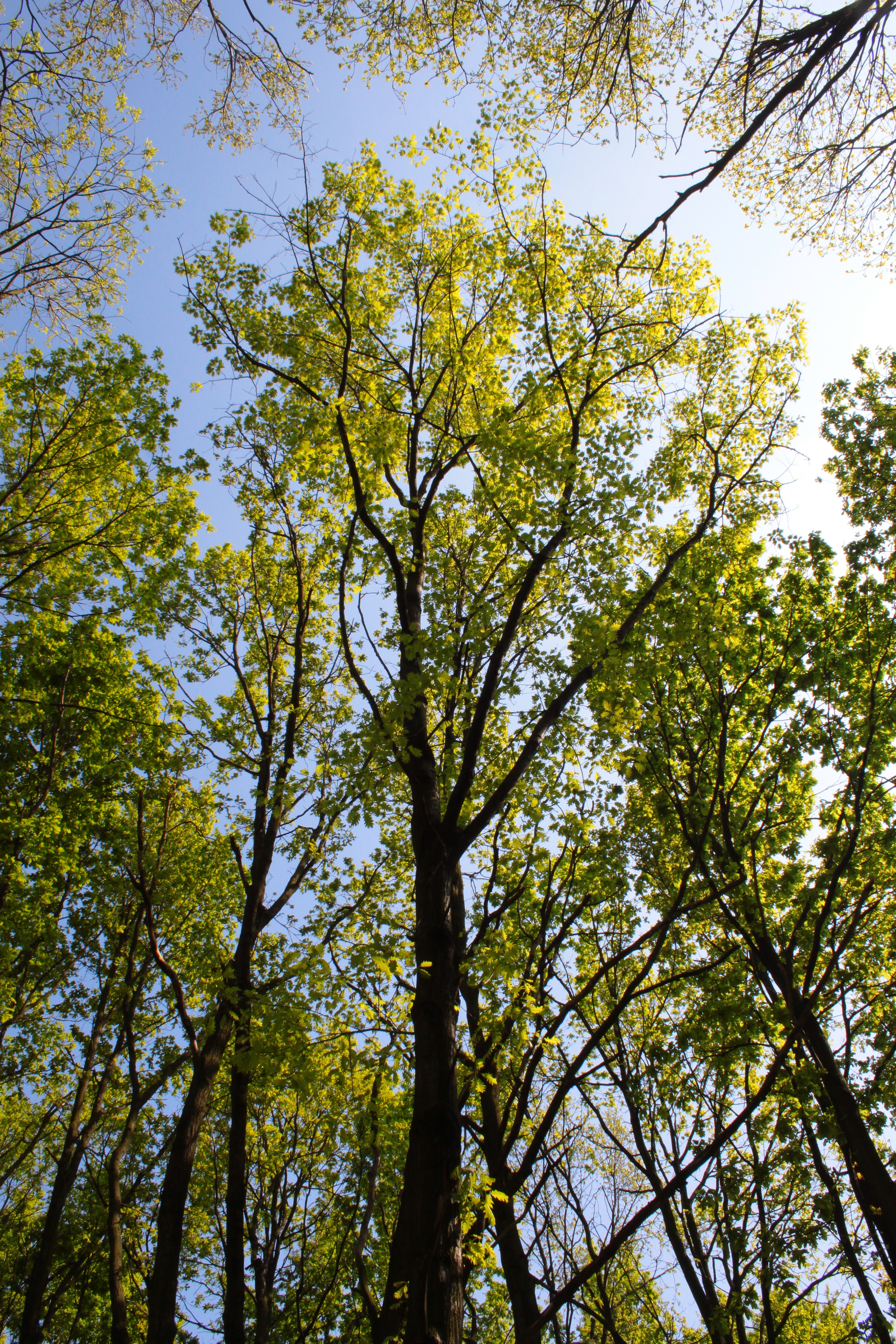
Quercus rubra

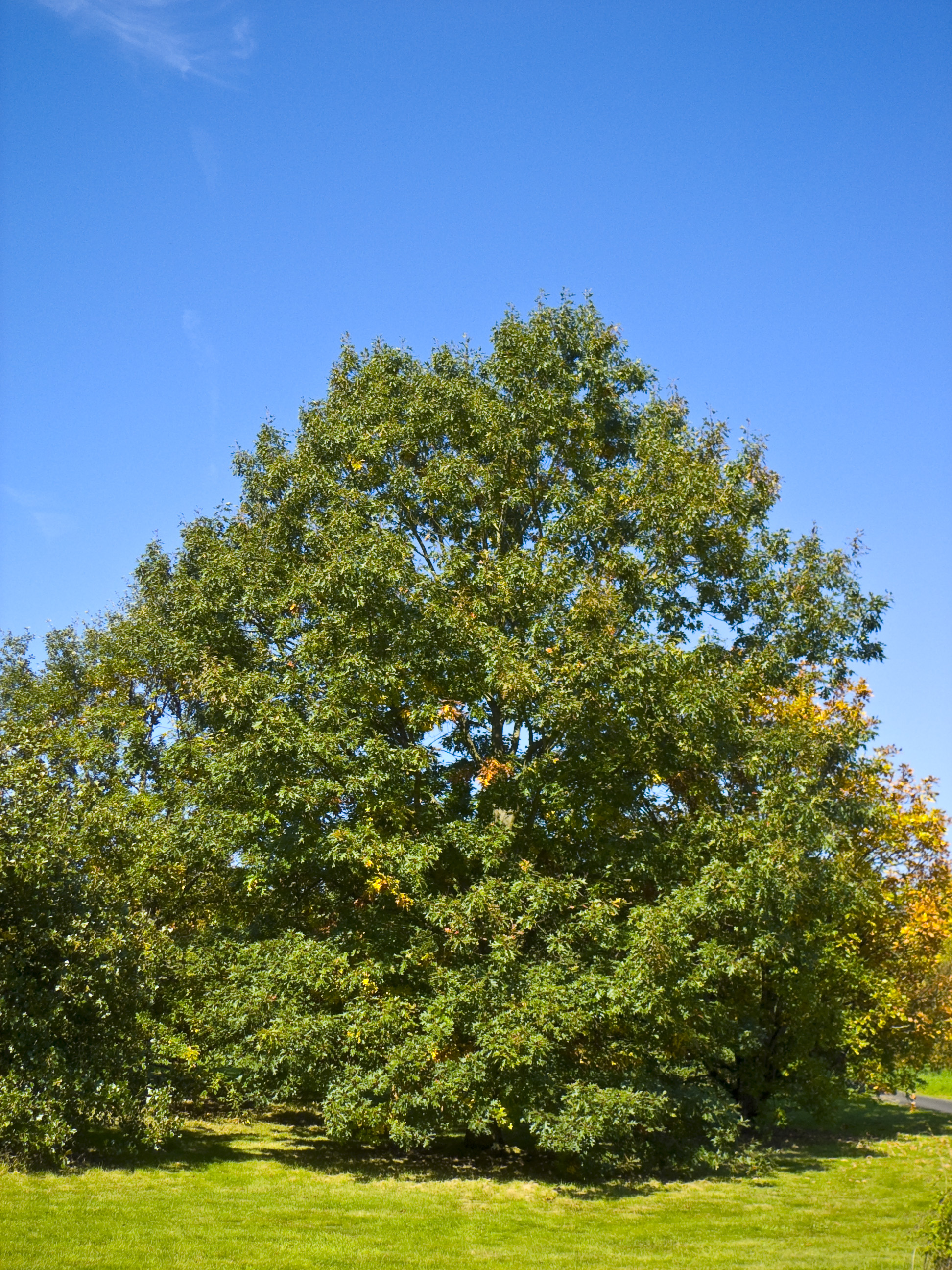
Quercus velutina

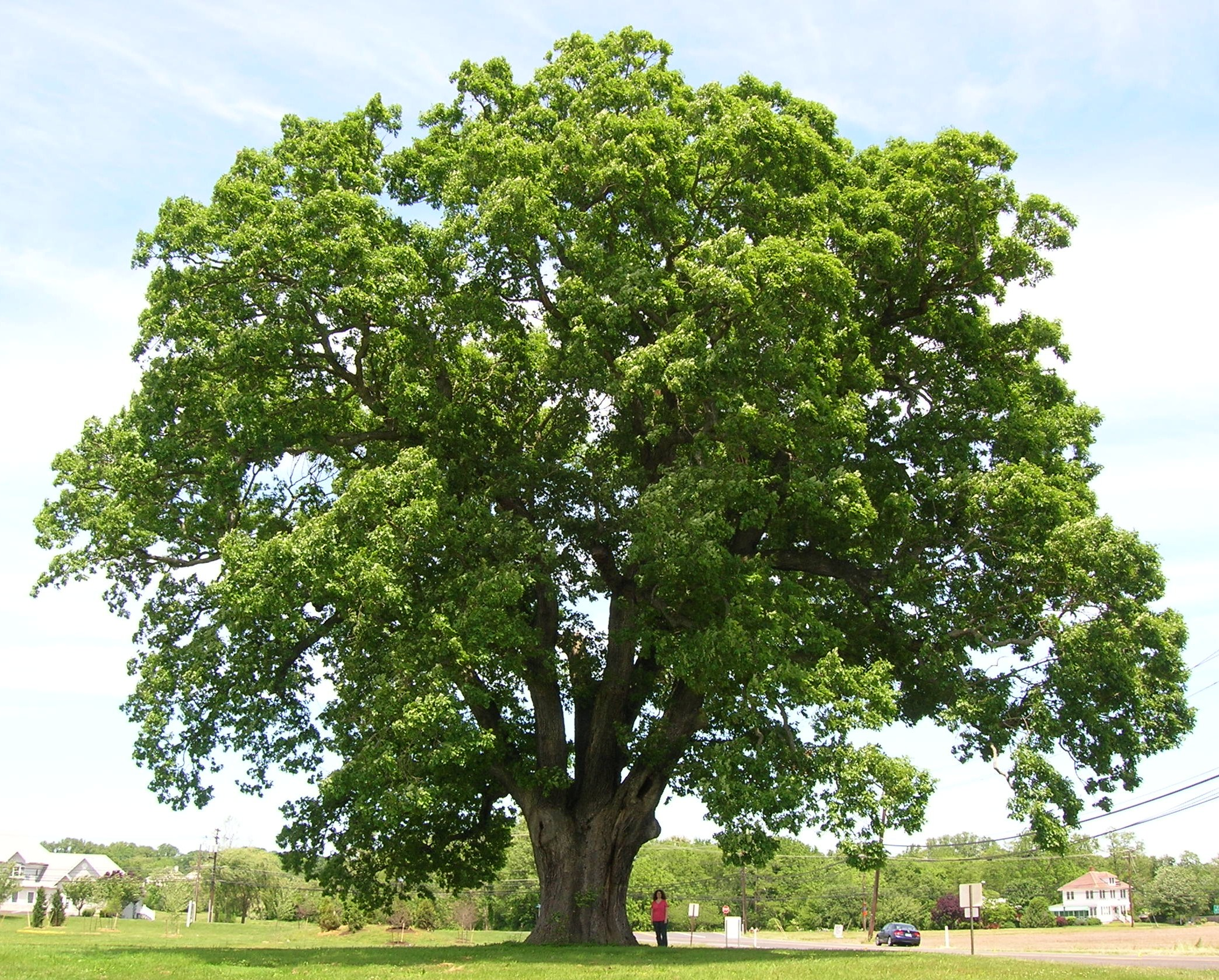
Quercus alba

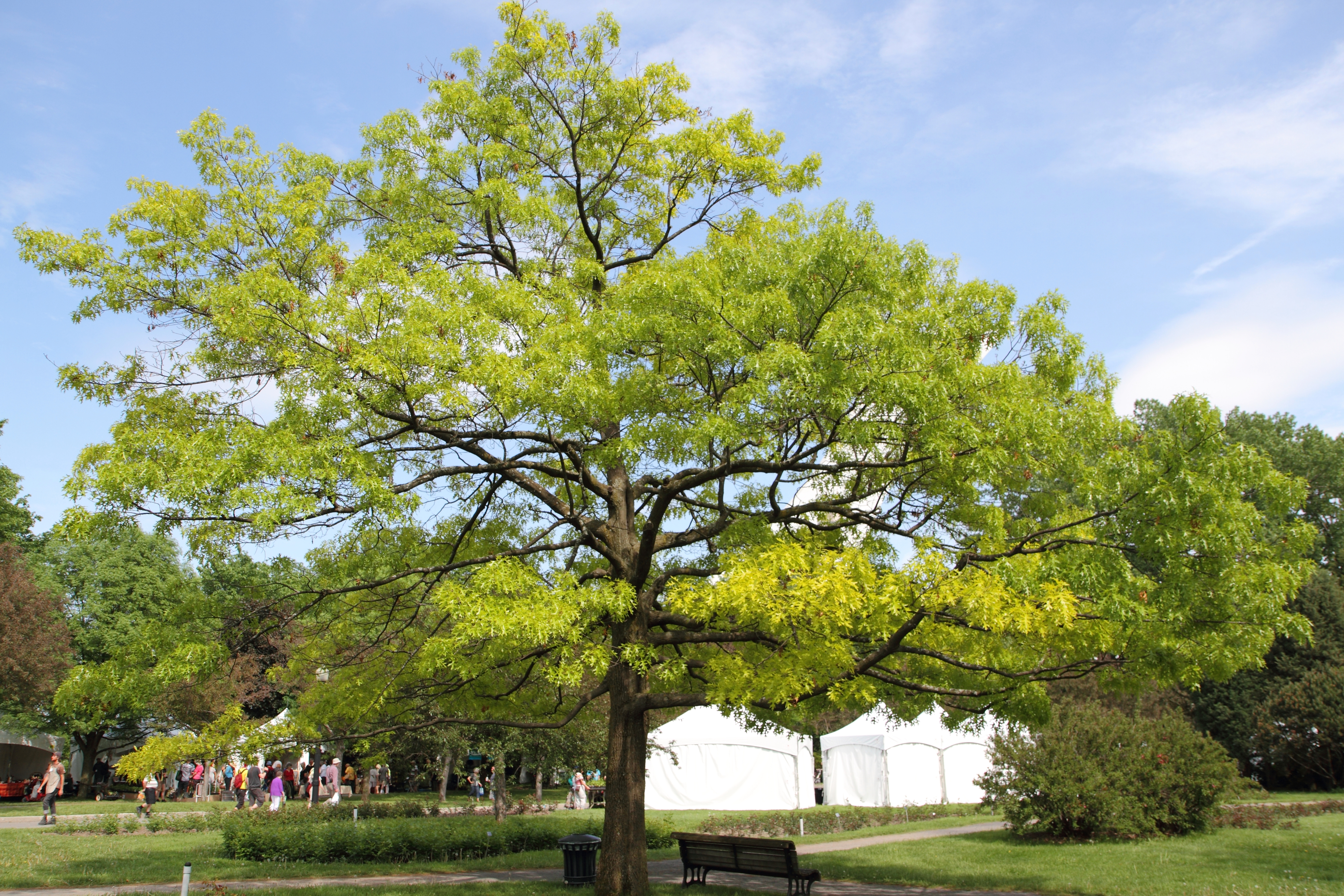
Quercus coccinea

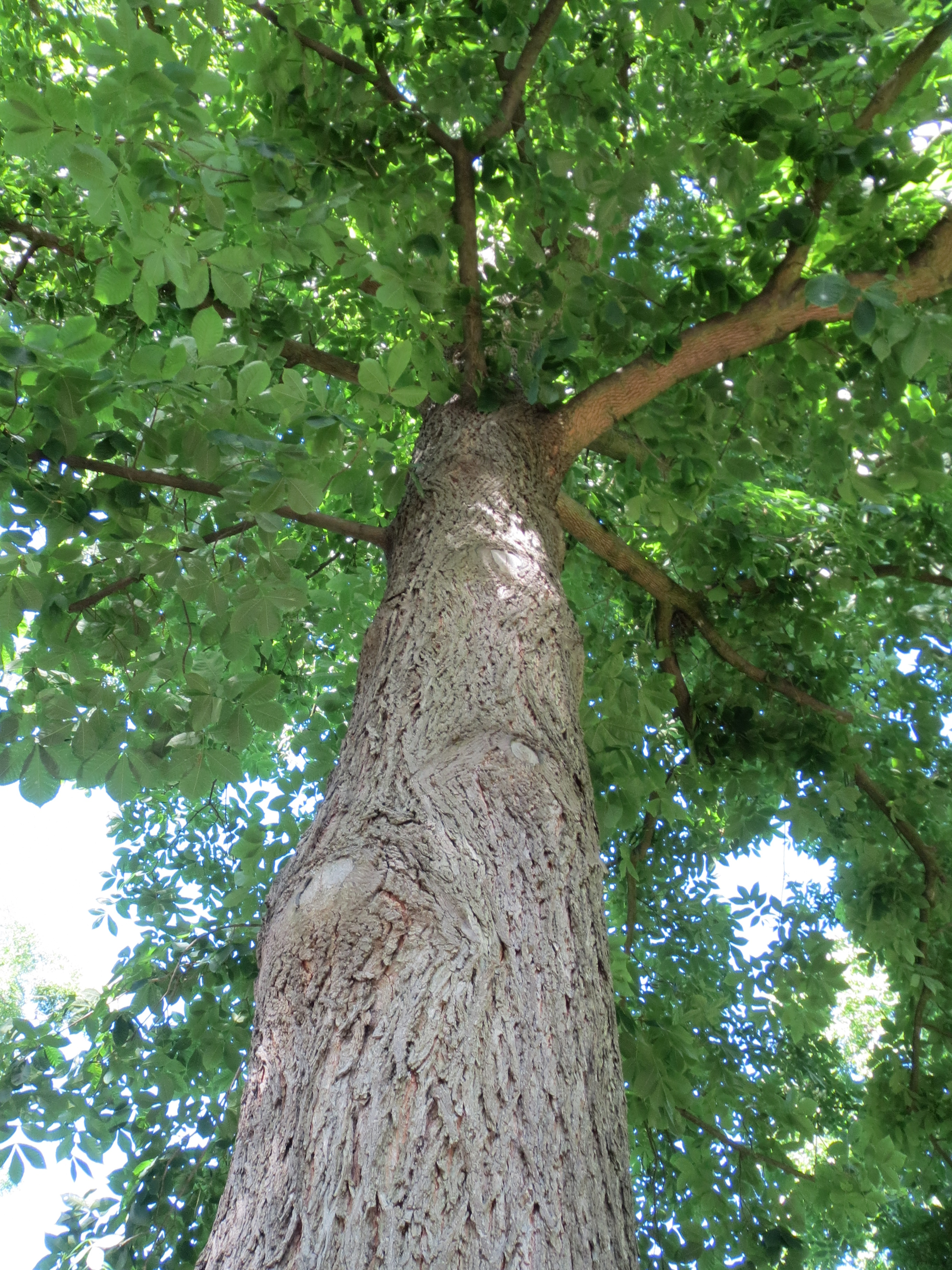
Carya cordiformis

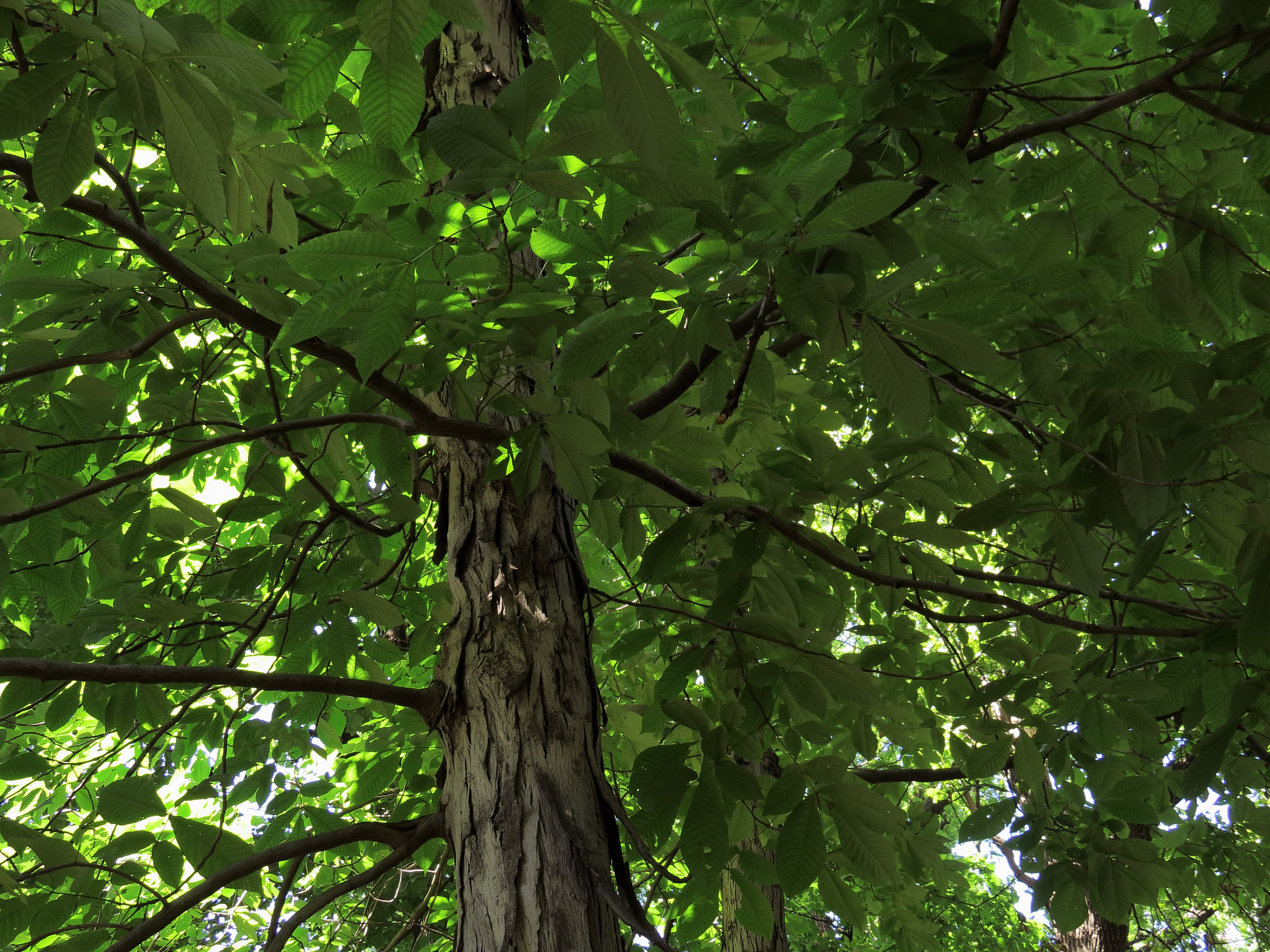
Carya ovata

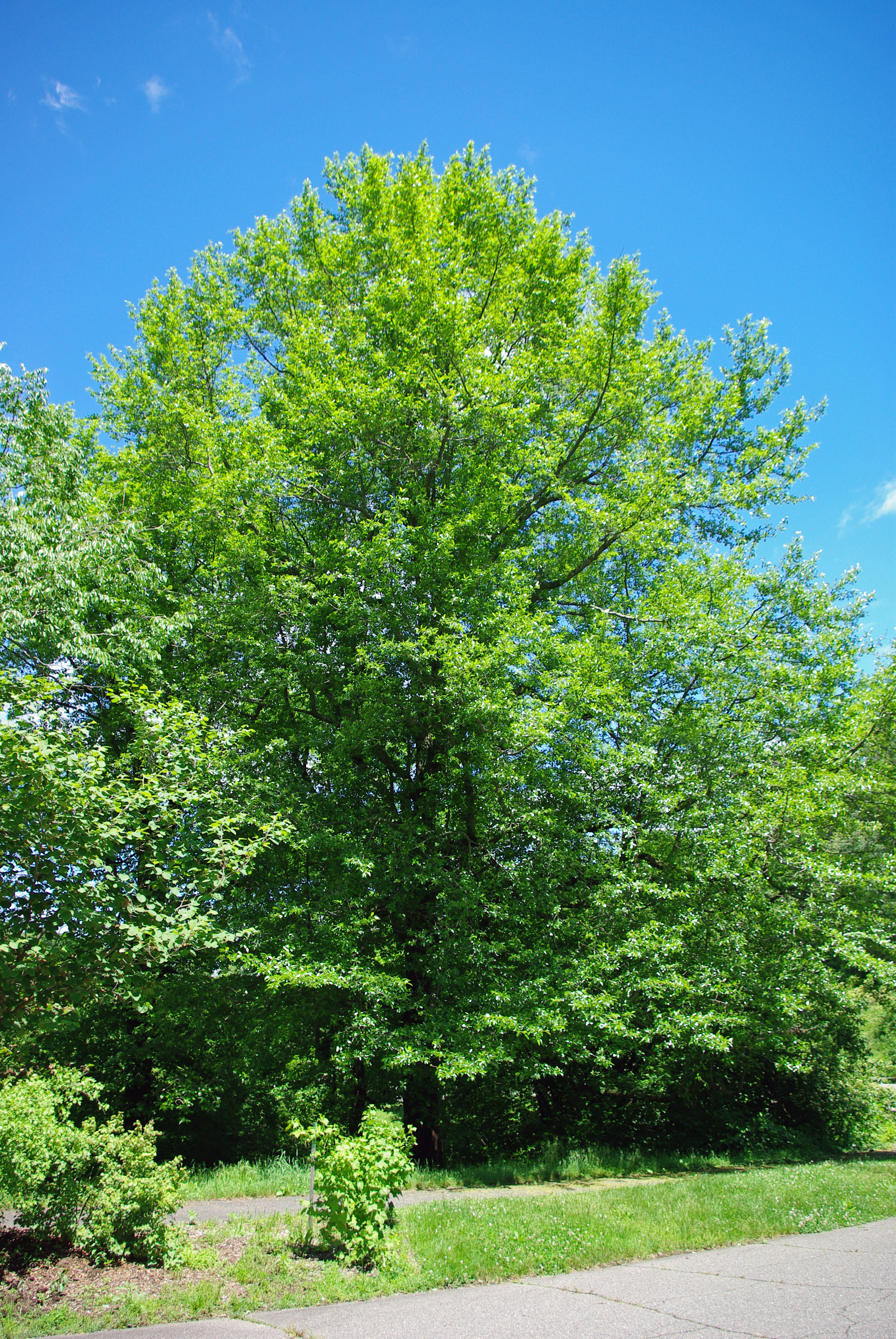
Nyssa sylvatica

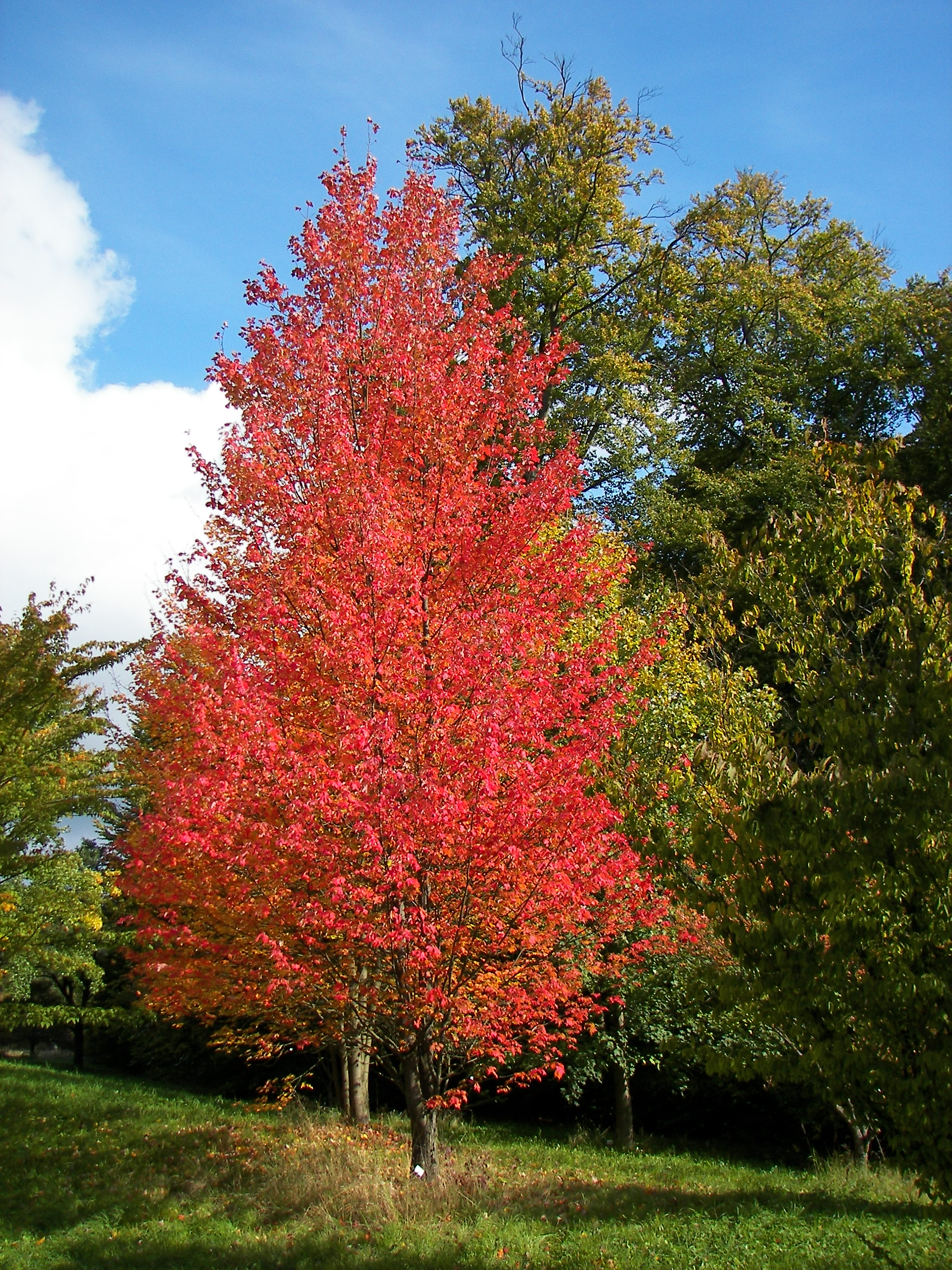
Acer rubrum

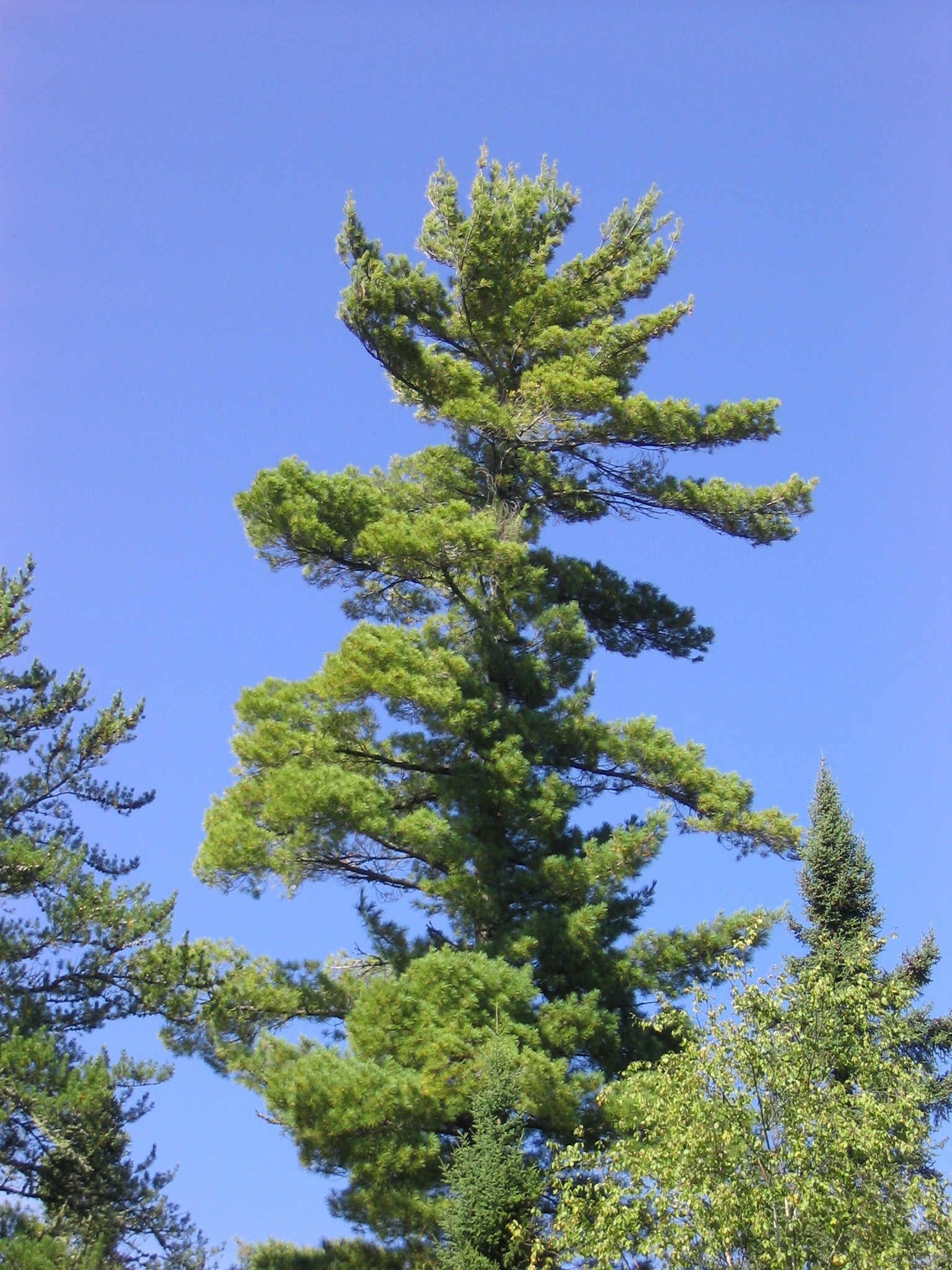
Pinus strobus

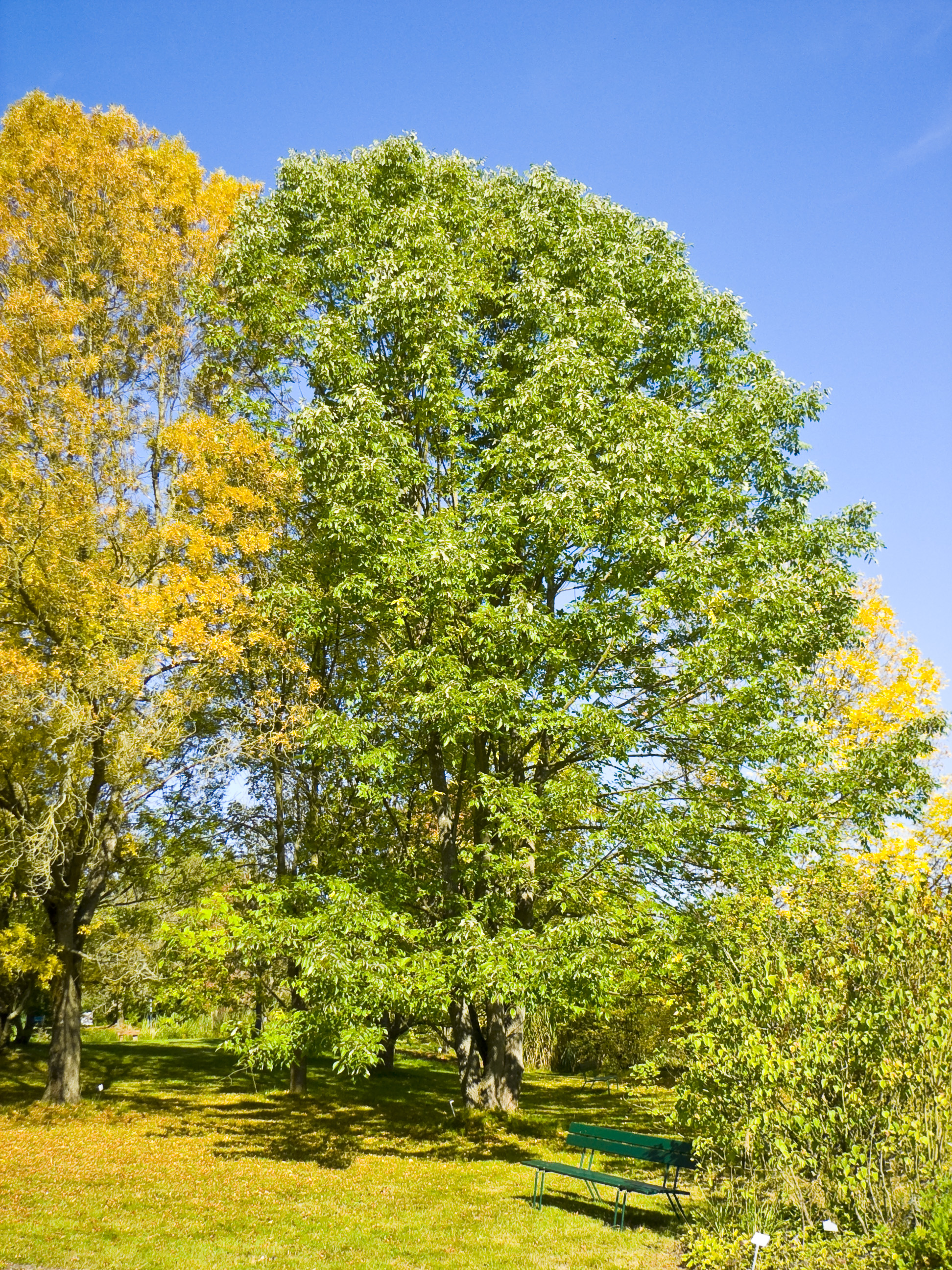
Fraxinus americana

=== Dry calcareous forests ===
The Southern Ridge and Valley/Cumberland dry calcareous forests occur on dry to dry–mesic calcareous habitats in the southern Ridge-and-Valley Appalachians. They are often found on deep soils in a variety landscapes within their range. Trees are mainly oaks and hickories, with other species less abundant. Oaks include white oak (Quercus alba), northern red oak (Quercus rubra), post oak (Quercus stellata), chinkapin oak (Quercus muehlenbergii), and Shumard oak (Quercus shumardii). Hickories include shagbark hickory (Carya ovata). Other trees can be sugar maple (Acer saccharum), eastern red-cedar (Juniperus virginiana), or pines.

=== Dry oak forests and woodlands ===
The Allegheny-Cumberland dry oak forest and woodland forest system is found on ridges in the southern Ridge and Valley. The forests are typically dominated by white oak (Quercus alba), southern red oak (Quercus falcata), chestnut oak (Quercus montana), scarlet oak (Quercus coccinea), with lesser amounts of red maple (Acer rubrum), pignut hickory (Carya glabra), and mockernut hickory (Carya tomentosa). A few shortleaf pines (Pinus echinata) or Virginia pines (Pinus virginiana) may occur, particularly adjacent to escarpments or following fire. Sprouts of chestnut (Castanea dentata) can often be found where it was formerly a common tree.

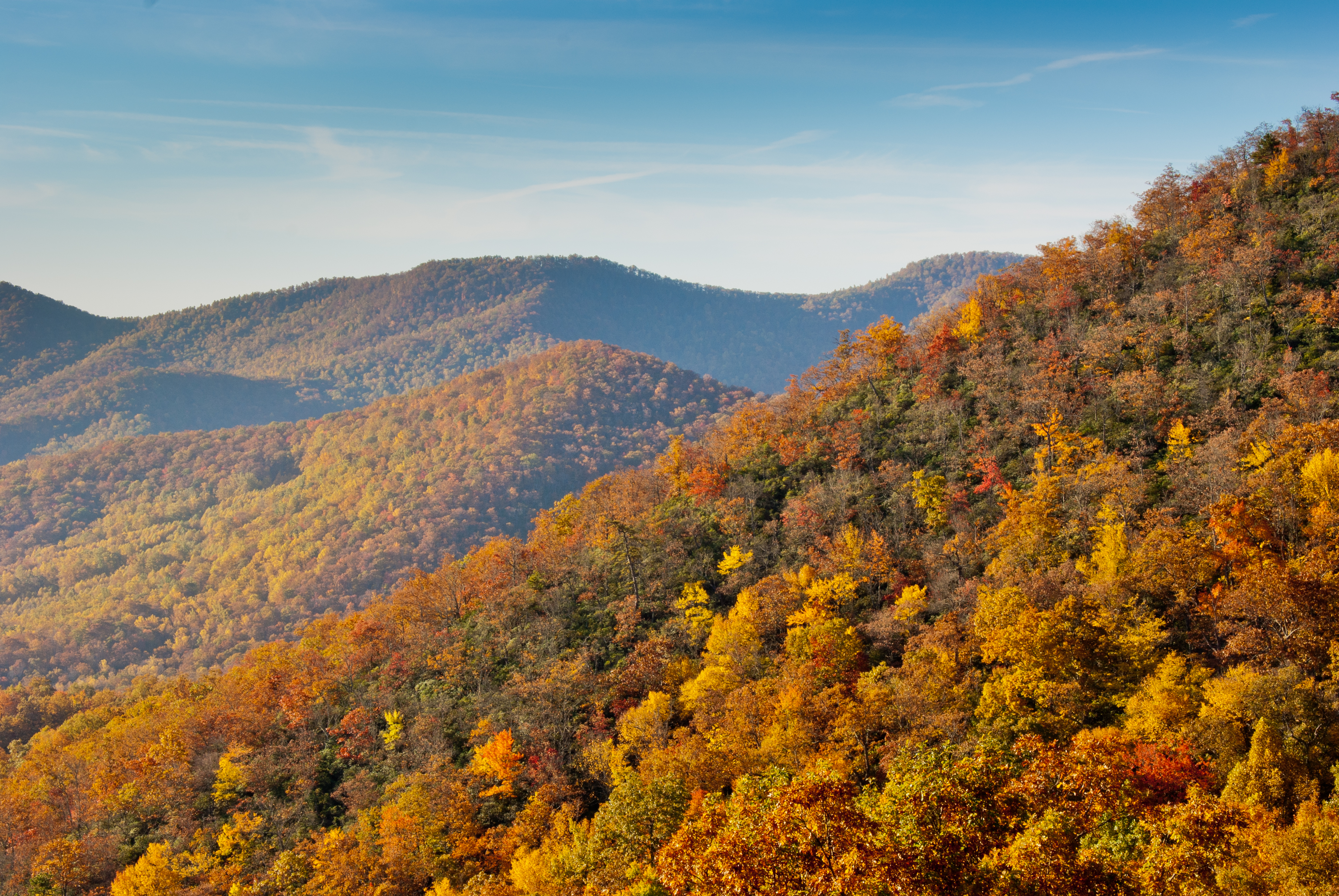
Fall colors near Asheville, North Carolina.

=== Dry oak–pine forests ===
Central Appalachian dry oak–pine forests occur on dry sites with loamy to sandy soils. A mix of oak and pine tree species dominate the canopy, typically chestnut oak (Quercus montana), Virginia pine (Pinus virginiana), and white pine (Pinus strobus), but sometimes white oak (Quercus alba) or scarlet oak (Quercus coccinea). Varying amounts of oaks and pines can result in oak forests, mixed oak–pine forests, or small pine forests. Flowering dogwood (Cornus florida), sourwood (Oxydendrum arboreum), sassafras (Sassafras albidum), and blackgum (Nyssa sylvatica) live in the midstory and hillside blueberry (Vaccinium pallidum), black huckleberry (Gaylussacia baccata), and mountain laurel (Kalmia latifolia) are common in the understory, where they can form a dense layer.

=== Dry–mesic oak forests ===
Northeastern interior dry–mesic oak forests cover large areas at low and middle elevations, typically on flat to gently rolling terrain. Red oak (Quercus rubra), white oak (Quercus alba), and black oak (Quercus velutina) are common oaks in this habitat. Other trees include hickories (Carya spp.), red maple (Acer rubrum), sugar maple (Acer saccharum), white ash (Fraxinus americana), tulip tree (Liriodendron tulipifera), American beech (Fagus grandifolia), black cherry (Prunus serotina), black birch (Betula lenta), black tupelo (Nyssa sylvatica), and American elm (Ulmus americana). Flowering dogwood (Cornus florida) is a common understory tree.

=== Pine-oak rocky woodland ===
Central Appalachian pine-oak rocky woodlands occur on lower-elevation hilltops, outcrops, and rocky slopes and have a patchy or open aspect. Pitch pine (Pinus rigida) and Virginia pine (Pinus virginiana) are common within their respective ranges. These pines are often mixed with dry-site oaks such as chestnut oak (Quercus montana), bear oak (Quercus ilicifolia), northern red oak (Quercus rubra), and scarlet oak (Quercus coccinea). Sprouts of chestnut (Castanea dentata) can also be found. In the northeast, eastern red-cedar (Juniperus virginiana) or hophornbeam (Ostrya virginiana) are sometimes important. In the understory, some areas have a fairly well-developed heath shrub layer, others a graminoid layer, the latter particularly common under deciduous trees such as oaks.

=== Montane oak forests ===
Montane oak forests occur on exposed ridges and on south- to west-facing slopes at middle elevations. Soils are thin and nutrient-poor and trees are often stunted and wind-flagged. Northern red oak (Quercus rubra) and white oak (Quercus alba) are common, as are sprouts of American chestnut (Castanea dentata). Winterberry (Ilex montana), flame azalea (Rhododendron calendulaceum), catawba rhododendron (Rhododendron catawbiense), and great rhododendron (Rhododendron maximum) are common shrubs.

=== Montane pine forests and woodlands ===
These forests and woodlands are found on exposed ridges, clifftops, and south- and west-facing slopes. They occur at elevations between 1,500 to 4,000 feet (460 to 1,220 m) on often rocky ground. The underlying rock is acidic and sedimentary or metasedimentary (e.g., quartzites, sandstones and shales). The soil is shallow, arid, and infertile. Dead wood, ericaceous shrubs, and a thick layer of poorly decomposed plant litter make this habitat very fire-prone. Most examples are dominated by table mountain pine (Pinus pungens), often with pitch pine (Pinus rigida) or Virginia pine (Pinus virginiana), and occasionally with Carolina hemlock (Tsuga caroliniana) and chestnut oak (Quercus montana). This habitat takes the form of patchy to open woodlands, although closed-canopy may also be found.

=== Northern hardwood forests ===
Northern hardwood forests occur in cool, mesic habitats found above 4,500 feet (1,400 m) on north- and east-facing slopes of the southern Appalachians. Oak forests are often found nearby, either at lower elevations or in more exposed areas. Sugar maple (Acer saccharum), beech (Fagus grandifolia), yellow birch (Betula alleghaniensis), and yellow buckeye (Aesculus flava) dominate but are sometimes joined by the conifers eastern hemlock (Tsuga canadensis), eastern white pine (Pinus strobus), and red spruce (Picea rubens). Black cherry (Prunus serotina) and white basswood (Tilia heterophylla) are occasionally abundant. Red oak (Quercus rubra) may be present but is not dominant. Areas where beech is dominant are known as beech gaps.

=== Hemlock–northern hardwood forests ===
Hemlock–northern hardwood forests are found in deep coves, moist flats, and ravines from Virginia and West Virginia northward. They include yellow birch (Betula alleghaniensis), mountain maple (Acer spicatum), sugar maple (Acer saccharum), and beech (Fagus grandifolia). These trees are sometimes joined by hemlock (Tsuga canadensis) or white pine (Pinus strobus).

=== Spruce-fir forests ===
Uncommon but significant are montane and allied spruce and southern Appalachian spruce-fir forests. These occur only on the highest peaks and ridges, where the soils are poor, the growing season short, and moisture comes from rain, snow, and fog. Red spruce, Fraser fir, yellow birch, mountain ash, and mountain maple identify these forests, while hobblebush and bearberry occur in the understory.

=== Balds ===
Appalachian balds are areas covered by native grasses or dense shrubs that occur only on some high-elevation summits and slopes.

=== Bogs ===
Appalachian bogs are boreal ecosystems, which occur in many places in the Appalachians, particularly the Allegheny and Blue Ridge subranges. Though popularly called bogs, many of them are technically fens. Bog species include cranberry and blueberry (Vaccinium spp.), bog rosemary (Andromeda glaucophylla), and buckbean (Menyanthes trifoliata). These bogs are relicts that have survived since the last glacial period.

=== Sods ===
Sods is a term used in the Allegheny Mountains of eastern West Virginia for a mountaintop meadow or bog, in an area that is otherwise generally forested. The term is similar to that of an Appalachian bald.

== Fauna ==
Endangered or threatened species of the Appalachians include some snails and salamanders, the red wolf (Canis rufus) and the spruce-fir moss spider (Microhexura montivaga). The limestone caves of the Appalachians are important habitat for bats, invertebrates, fish and salamanders including 34 species of lungless salamander, more than anywhere else on earth.

== Threats ==
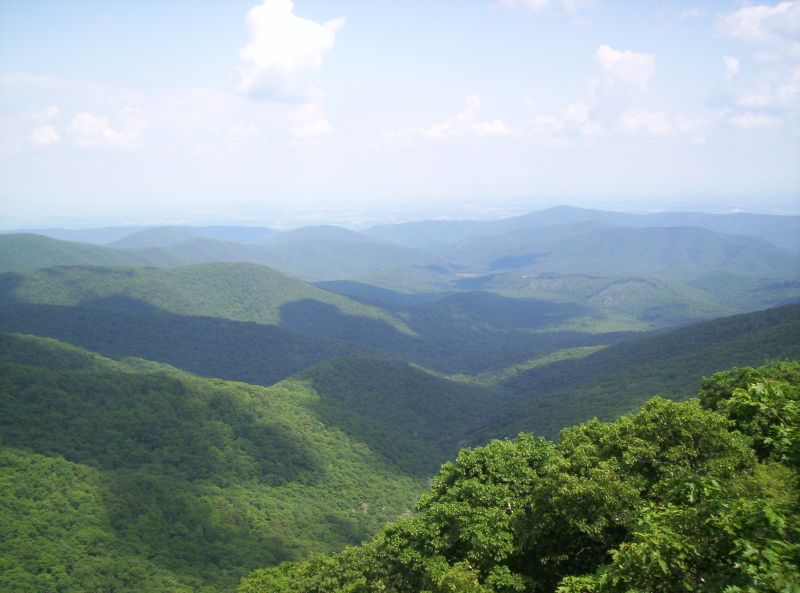
View from Little Bald Knob on the Wild Oak Trail.

The forests have been altered by logging and clearance for agriculture, urban and industrial development (including mining) with only small patches of original forest remaining, the largest of which is in the Great Smoky Mountains; nearly all of Shenandoah National Park, for example, is regrown forest but still vital habitat for wildlife. The spruce and fir forests of the highlands have been logged particularly intensively and in many cases have not regenerated leaving areas of Appalachian balds heath. Also, as large predators such as wolves and cougars have been removed, the forests are now being overgrazed by deer. Plants and animals are also threatened by introduced species including the gypsy moth (Lymantria dispar), spruce budworm (Choristoneura fumiferana), hemlock woolly adelgid (Adelges tsugae), balsam woolly adelgid (A. piceae) and the Discula destructiva that affects dogwoods and is similar to chestnut blight.

== Areas of intact habitat ==
Areas of intact forest, mostly in public ownership, include:

- Alabama
  - Talladega National Forest
    - Dugger Mountain Wilderness
  - Mountain Longleaf National Wildlife Refuge
  - The Indian Mountain Tract
  - Little River Canyon National Preserve
- Georgia
  - Crockford-Pigeon Mountain Wildlife Management Area
  - Chattahoochee National Forest
    - Blood Mountain Wilderness
    - Raven Cliffs Wilderness
    - Mark Trail Wilderness
    - Southern Nantahala Wilderness
    - Ellicott Rock Wilderness
    - Big Frog Wilderness
    - Brasstown Wilderness
    - Tray Mountain Wilderness
    - Cohutta Wilderness
    - Rich Mountain Wilderness
- South Carolina
  - Gorges State Park
  - Mountain Bridge Wilderness Area
  - Sumter National Forest
    - Ellicott Rock Wilderness
- North Carolina
  - DuPont State Forest
  - Pisgah National Forest
    - Shining Rock Wilderness
    - Middle Prong Wilderness
    - Linville Gorge Wilderness
  - Nantahala National Forest
    - Ellicott Rock Wilderness
    - Joyce Kilmer-Slickrock Wilderness
  - Cherokee National Forest
  - Great Smoky Mountains National Park
  - South Mountains State Park
- Tennessee
  - Great Smoky Mountains National Park
  - Cherokee National Forest
    - Little Frog Wilderness
    - Big Frog Wilderness
    - Cohutta Wilderness
    - Gee Creek Wilderness
    - Bald River Gorge Wilderness
    - Citico Creek Wilderness
    - Joyce Kilmer-Slickrock Wilderness
    - Sampson Mountain Wilderness
    - Unaka Mountain Wilderness
    - Pond Mountain Wilderness
    - Big Laurel Branch Wilderness
- Virginia
  - George Washington and Jefferson National Forests
    - Ramsey's Draft Wilderness
    - Rough Mountain Wilderness
    - Rich Hole Wilderness
    - Saint Mary's Wilderness
    - Priest Wilderness
    - Three Ridges Wilderness
    - James River Face Wilderness
    - Shawvers Run Wilderness
    - Peters Mountain Wilderness
    - Mountain Lake Wilderness
    - Brush Mountain East Wilderness
    - Brush Mountain Wilderness
    - Hunting Camp Creek Wilderness
    - Garden Mountain Wilderness
    - Beartown Wilderness
    - Little Dry Run Wilderness
    - Raccoon Branch Wilderness
    - Little Wilson Creek Wilderness
    - Lewis Fork Wilderness
  - Clinch Mountain Wildlife Management Area
  - Hidden Valley Wildlife Management Area
  - Nathaniel Mountain Wildlife Management Area
  - Sleepy Creek Wildlife Management Area
  - Shenandoah National Park
  - Indian Springs Wildlife Management Area
- West Virginia
  - Monongahela National Forest
    - Laurel Fork North Wilderness
    - Laurel Fork South Wilderness
    - Spice Run Wilderness
    - Big Draft Wilderness
- Maryland
  - Savage River State Forest
  - Green Ridge State Forest
- Pennsylvania
  - Buchanan State Forest
  - Michaux State Forest
  - Tuscarora State Forest
  - Rothrock State Forest
  - Bald Eagle State Forest
- New Jersey
  - Delaware Water Gap National Recreation Area
  - Bear Swamp Wildlife Management Area
  - Worthington State Forest
  - Wallkill River National Wildlife Refuge
- New York
  - Highland Lakes State Park
  - Stewart State Forest

== See also ==
- Appalachian temperate rainforest
- Southern Appalachian spruce-fir forest — an adjacent higher elevations ecoregion.
- Appalachian balds
- List of ecoregions in the United States (WWF)
