= Northeastern coastal forests =

Temperate broadleaf and mixed forest ecoregion of the United States

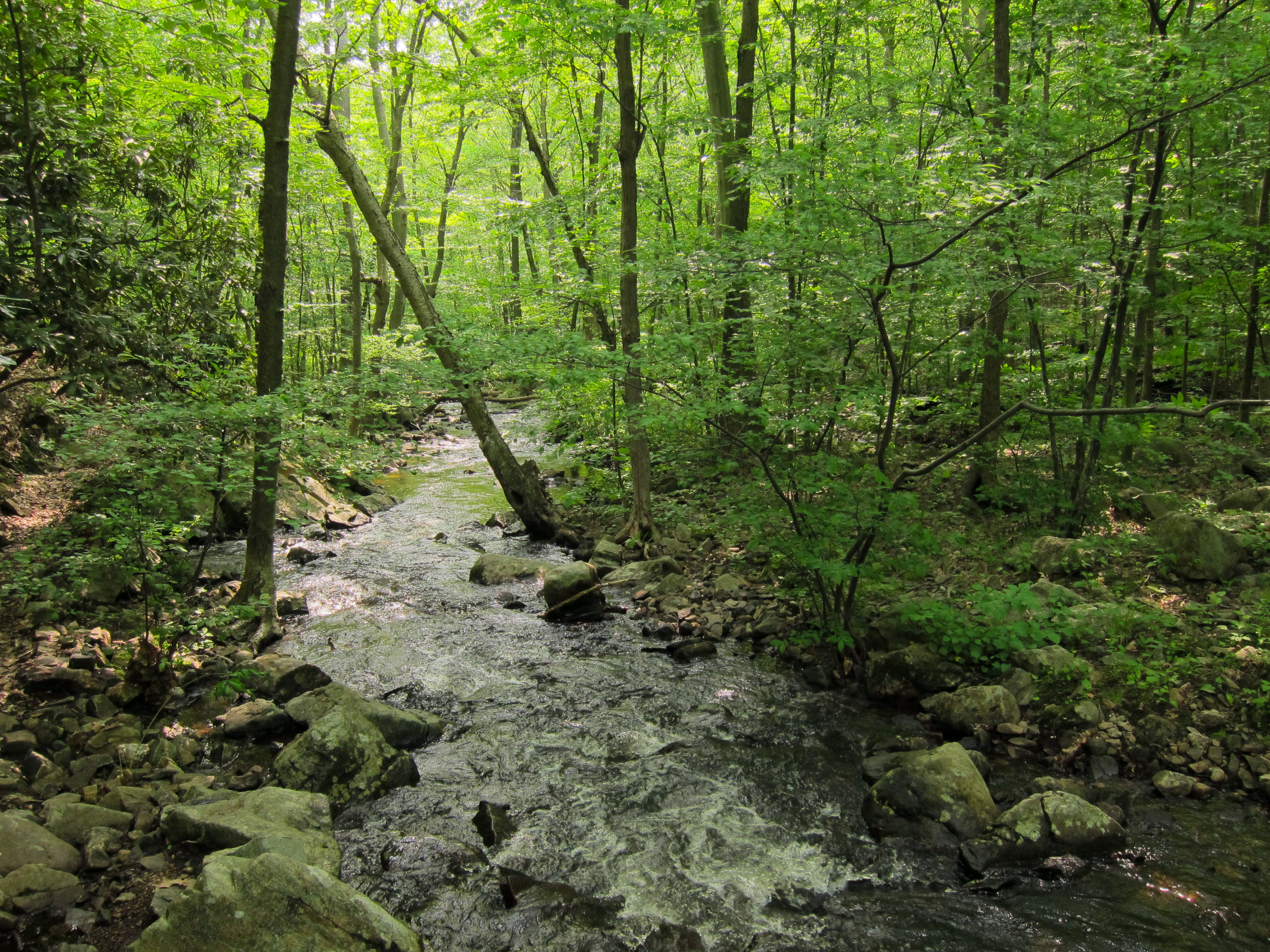
- Norvin Green State Forest in New Jersey

Ecology
- Realm: Nearctic
- Biome: Temperate broadleaf and mixed forests
- Borders: List: New England-Acadian forests; Eastern Great Lakes lowland forests; Allegheny Highlands forests; Appalachian-Blue Ridge forests; Southeastern mixed forests; Middle Atlantic coastal forests; Atlantic coastal pine barrens
- Bird species: 251
- Mammal species: 63

Geography
- Area: 89,691 km^{2} (34,630 mi^{2})
- Country: United States
- States: List: Connecticut; Delaware; Maine; Maryland; Massachusetts; New Hampshire; New Jersey; New York; Pennsylvania; Rhode Island; Vermont
- Climate type: Humid continental (Dfa and Dfb) and humid subtropical (Cfa)

Conservation
- Habitat loss: 40.8%
- Protected: 6.2%

The Northeastern coastal forests are a temperate broadleaf and mixed forests ecoregion of the northeast and middle Atlantic region of the United States. The ecoregion covers an area of 34,630 sq miles (89,691 km^{2}) encompassing the Piedmont and coastal plain of seven states, extending from coastal southwestern Maine, southeastern New Hampshire, eastern Massachusetts, and Rhode Island, southward through Connecticut, New York State, New Jersey, southeast Pennsylvania, Delaware and Maryland.

The ecoregion is bounded on the east by the Atlantic Ocean. To the north, it transitions to the New England-Acadian forests, which cover most of northern and inland New England. To the west, the ecoregion transitions to Allegheny Highlands forests and the Appalachian-Blue Ridge forests of the Appalachian Mountains. To the south lie the Southeastern mixed forests and the Middle Atlantic coastal forests. The ecoregion surrounds the distinct Atlantic coastal pine barrens ecoregion, which covers portions of New Jersey, Long Island and Cape Cod in southeastern Massachusetts.

== Climate ==
The climate in this ecoregion is the broad transition from the humid continental in the north to the humid subtropical climate in the south.

== Flora ==
Oak forests dominate this ecoregion. American chestnut (Castanea dentata) was formerly important, but its population was devastated by the chestnut blight early in the 20th century.

=== Dry-mesic oak forests ===
Northeastern interior dry-mesic oak forests are found throughout this ecoregion. They cover large areas at low and middle elevations, typically on flat to gently rolling terrain. Red oak (Quercus rubra), white oak (Quercus alba), and black oak (Quercus velutina) are common oaks in this habitat. Other trees include hickories (Carya spp.), red maple (Acer rubrum), sugar maple (Acer saccharum), white ash (Fraxinus americana), tulip tree (Liriodendron tulipifera), American beech (Fagus grandifolia), black cherry (Prunus serotina), black birch (Betula lenta), black tupelo (Nyssa sylvatica), and American elm (Ulmus americana). Flowering dogwood (Cornus florida) is a common understory tree.

Common shrubs are maple-leaved viburnum (Viburnum acerifolium), spicebush (Lindera benzoin), and witch hazel (Hamamelis virginiana). In sandier or more acidic soils are mountain laurel (Kalmia latifolia), blueberry (Vaccinium pallidum), huckleberry (Gaylussacia baccata), and swamp azalea (Rhododendron viscosum).

Mayapple (Podophyllum peltatum) is a common herbaceous plant.

=== Hemlock-northern hardwood forests ===
Hemlock-northern hardwood forests occur in deep coves, moist flats, and ravines. They include sugar maple, yellow birch (Betula alleghaniensis), and beech. These trees often form a deciduous canopy, but are sometimes mixed with hemlock (Tsuga canadensis) or white pine (Pinus strobus). Other common trees include oaks (most commonly red oak), tuliptree, black cherry, and sweet birch. In the Northeast, red spruce (Picea rubens) can be a minor canopy associate. Hophornbeam (Ostrya virginiana) is frequent but not dominant.

=== Dry oak-pine forests ===
Central Appalachian dry oak-pine forests occur on dry sites with loamy to sandy soils. A mix of oak and pine tree species dominate the canopy, typically chestnut oak (Quercus prinus), Virginia pine (Pinus virginiana), and white pine (Pinus strobus), but sometimes white oak (Quercus alba) or scarlet oak (Quercus coccinea). Varying amounts of oaks and pines result in oak forests, mixed oak-pine forests, or small pine forests. Shrubs such as hillside blueberry (Vaccinium pallidum), black huckleberry (Gaylussacia baccata), and mountain laurel (Kalmia latifolia) are common in the understory and can form a dense layer.

=== Pine-oak rocky woodlands ===
Central Appalachian pine-oak rocky woodlands occur on lower-elevation hilltops, outcrops, and rocky slopes and have a patchy or open aspect. Pitch pine (Pinus rigida) and Virginia pine (Pinus virginiana) are common within their respective ranges. These pines are often mixed with dry-site oaks such as chestnut oak (Quercus prinus), bear oak (Quercus ilicifolia), northern red oak (Quercus rubra), and scarlet oak (Quercus coccinea). Sprouts of chestnut (Castanea dentata) can also be found. In the northeast, eastern red-cedar (Juniperus virginiana) or hophornbeam (Ostrya virginiana) are sometimes important. In the understory, some areas have a fairly well-developed heath shrub layer, others a graminoid layer, the latter particularly common under deciduous trees such as oaks.

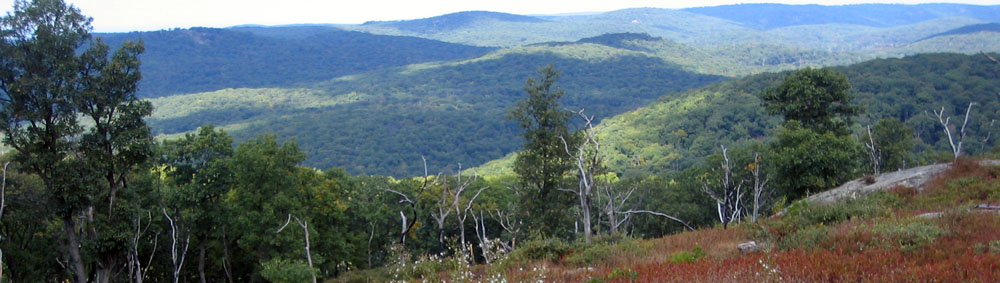
Harriman State Park in New York.

=== Successional plant communities ===
These occur in formerly cleared land, such as old farms, that have been abandoned. eastern red cedar (Juniperus virginiana) are some of the first trees to occupy these lands.

=== Freshwater wetlands ===
Marshes occur where standing water is present for most of the year. Common reed (Phragmites australis) and cattails (Typha spp.) are often abundant.

Swamps and floodplains occur where standing water is present for only some parts of the year. Red maple is a common tree, and can be found with swamp tupelo, white ash, American elm, pin oak (Quercus palustris), swamp white oak (Quercus bicolor), and silver maple (Acer saccharinum). Spicebush is a common shrub. Skunk cabbage (Symplocarpus foetidus) is found here.

== Fauna ==
Some of the animals that live in the Northeastern coastal deciduous forests are white-tailed deer, eastern gray squirrels, chipmunks, red foxes, sparrows, chickadees, copperheads, rattlesnakes, northern water snakes, box turtles, snapping turtles, black rat snakes, garter snakes, snails, American toads, coyotes, black bears, bobcats, beavers, woodchucks, skunks, and raccoons. Chickadees, white-tailed deer, and eastern gray squirrels can be seen quite often. Eastern wolves and eastern cougars used to be quite common, but are extirpated, causing endemic growth in deer populations near suburban areas, with eastern coyotes generally taking their place by the mid-20th century. Moose may also be seen in some of the northernmost regions of the Northeastern coastal forests, though this is very, very rare. Other fauna that occupy the area include bog turtles, ducks, rabbits, eagles, and (formerly) Canada lynx and sea mink.

== Areas of intact habitat ==
The following natural areas are within this ecoregion

- New Hampshire
  - Bear Brook State Park
  - Pawtuckaway State Park
- Massachusetts
  - Douglas State Forest
  - Freetown-Fall River State Forest
  - Great Salt Marsh
  - Hockomock Swamp
  - Parker River National Wildlife Refuge
  - Frederick Weston Memorial Forest
  - Wompatuck State Park
- Rhode Island
  - Arcadia Management Area
  - Great Swamp Management Area
- Connecticut
  - Meshomasic State Forest
  - Natchaug State Forest
  - Pachaug State Forest
  - Yale-Myers Forest
- New York
  - Bear Mountain State Park
  - Black Rock Forest
  - Clarence Fahnestock State Park
  - Harriman State Park
  - Hudson Highlands State Park
  - Oyster Bay National Wildlife Refuge
  - Sterling Forest State Park
  - Storm King State Park
- New Jersey
  - Abram S. Hewitt State Forest
  - Cheesequake State Park
  - Great Piece Meadows
  - Jenny Jump State Forest
  - Mahlon Dickerson Reservation
  - Norvin Green State Forest
  - Rancocas State Park
  - Ringwood State Park
  - Troy Meadows
  - Wawayanda State Park
- Pennsylvania
  - Hopewell Big Woods
  - Ridley Creek State Park
  - Evansburg State Park
  - French Creek State Park
- Maryland
  - Patuxent River State Park
  - Elk Neck State Forest
  - Elk Neck State Park
- Delaware
  - White Clay Creek State Park
  - Brandywine Creek State Park
  - Cedar Swamp Wildlife Area
  - Bellevue State Park
  - Auburn Valley State Park
  - Valley Garden Park
  - Alapocas Run State Park
  - Middle Run Valley Natural Area
  - Brandywine Park
  - First State National Historical Park
  - Forwood Preserve
  - Fox Point State Park
  - Bringhurst Woods Park
  - Rockwood Park
  - Sellers Park
  - Talley Day Park
  - William M. Redd, Jr. Park
  - The Hermitage (New Castle, Delaware)

== See also ==
- List of ecoregions in the United States (WWF)
