= Southern Appalachian low-elevation pine forest =

The Southern Appalachian low-elevation pine forest is a forest system that occurs in Indiana, Kentucky, Tennessee, Alabama, Virginia, North Carolina, South Carolina, and Georgia. It is found in the lower elevations of the southern Appalachian Mountains and adjacent Piedmont and Cumberland Plateau, extending into part of the Interior Low Plateaus. Pine Mountain (Bartow County, Georgia) is a great example of this forest type, as well as Sweat Mountain in the northern part of the Atlanta metropolitan area. Both of these mountain ridges are dominated by (Virginia Pine) Pinus virginiana

== Flora ==
These forests are dominated by shortleaf pine (Pinus echinata), Virginia pine (Pinus virginiana) and Loblolly Pine in the southern and western portions of the region. They can occur on a variety of topographic and landscape positions, including ridgetops, upper and midslopes, and lower elevations (generally below 2,300 feet (700 m) but mainly above 1,000 feet (300 m) ) in the Southern Appalachians. Examples occur on a variety of acidic bedrock types.

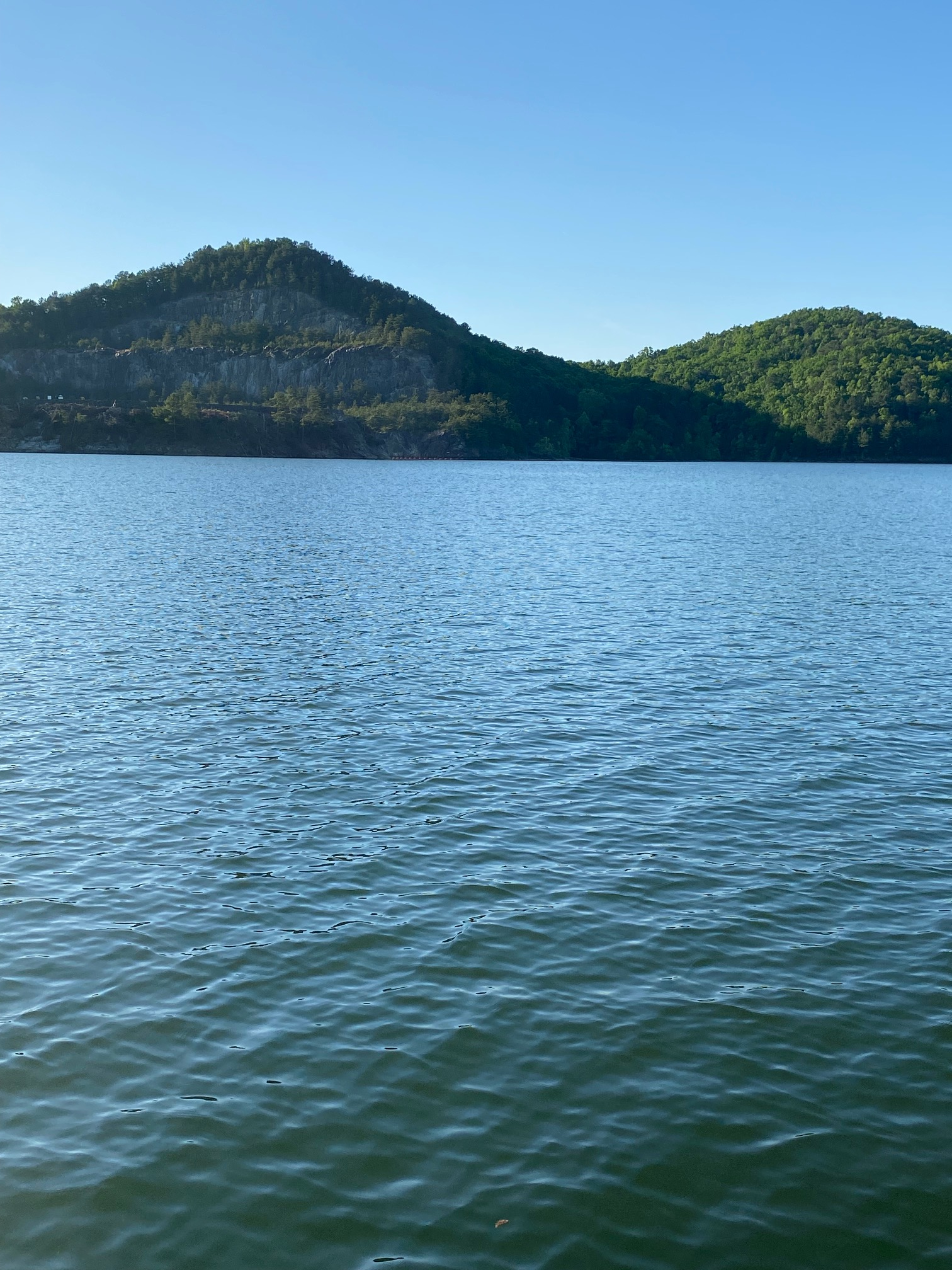
Virginia Pine covered mountain on Carters Lake Georgia

Pitch pine (Pinus rigida) may sometimes be present. Hardwoods are sometimes abundant, especially dry-site oaks such as southern red oak (Quercus falcata), chestnut oak (Quercus prinus), and scarlet oak (Quercus coccinea), but also pignut hickory (Carya glabra), red maple (Acer rubrum), and others. The shrub layer may be well-developed, with hillside blueberry (Vaccinium pallidum), black huckleberry (Gaylussacia baccata), or other acid-tolerant species most characteristic. Herbs are usually sparse but may include narrowleaf silkgrass (Pityopsis graminifolia) and goat-rue (Tephrosia virginiana).

This system is distinguished from Southern Appalachian montane pine forest and woodland by its occurrence over larger areas of less extreme terrain. The vegetation is similar, but pitch pine (Pinus rigida) and table mountain pine (Pinus pungens) are more typical in the montane pine forests and woodlands.
