= Dichomeris vacciniella =

Scientific classification
- Domain: Eukaryota
- Kingdom: Animalia
- Phylum: Arthropoda
- Class: Insecta
- Order: Lepidoptera
- Family: Gelechiidae
- Genus: Dichomeris
- Species: D. vacciniella

Binomial name
- Dichomeris vacciniella Busck, 1915

Synonyms
- Nothris nephanthes Meyrick, 1929

Species of moth

Dichomeris vacciniella is a moth in the family Gelechiidae. It was described by August Busck in 1915. It is found in North America, where it has been recorded from Nova Scotia, southern Quebec and southern Ontario to Florida, Michigan, Missouri and Arkansas.

The wingspan is 15–17 mm. The forewings are dark brown, sparsely and irregularly dusted with black scales and with three small, round, black dots, edged with white scales, one on the middle of the cell, one obliquely below and before it on the fold and one at the end of the cell. The apical part of the wing is strongly suffused with purplish black scales and the extreme apical and terminal edge is black. The hindwings are light fuscous, suffused with black on the outer costal part. Adults are on wing from February to October.

The larvae feed on Vaccinium species, including Vaccinium macrocarpon and Vaccinium pallidum.
