= Sampson Mountain Wilderness =

Wilderness area in the Cherokee National Forest, Tennessee

- IUCN category Ib (wilderness area)
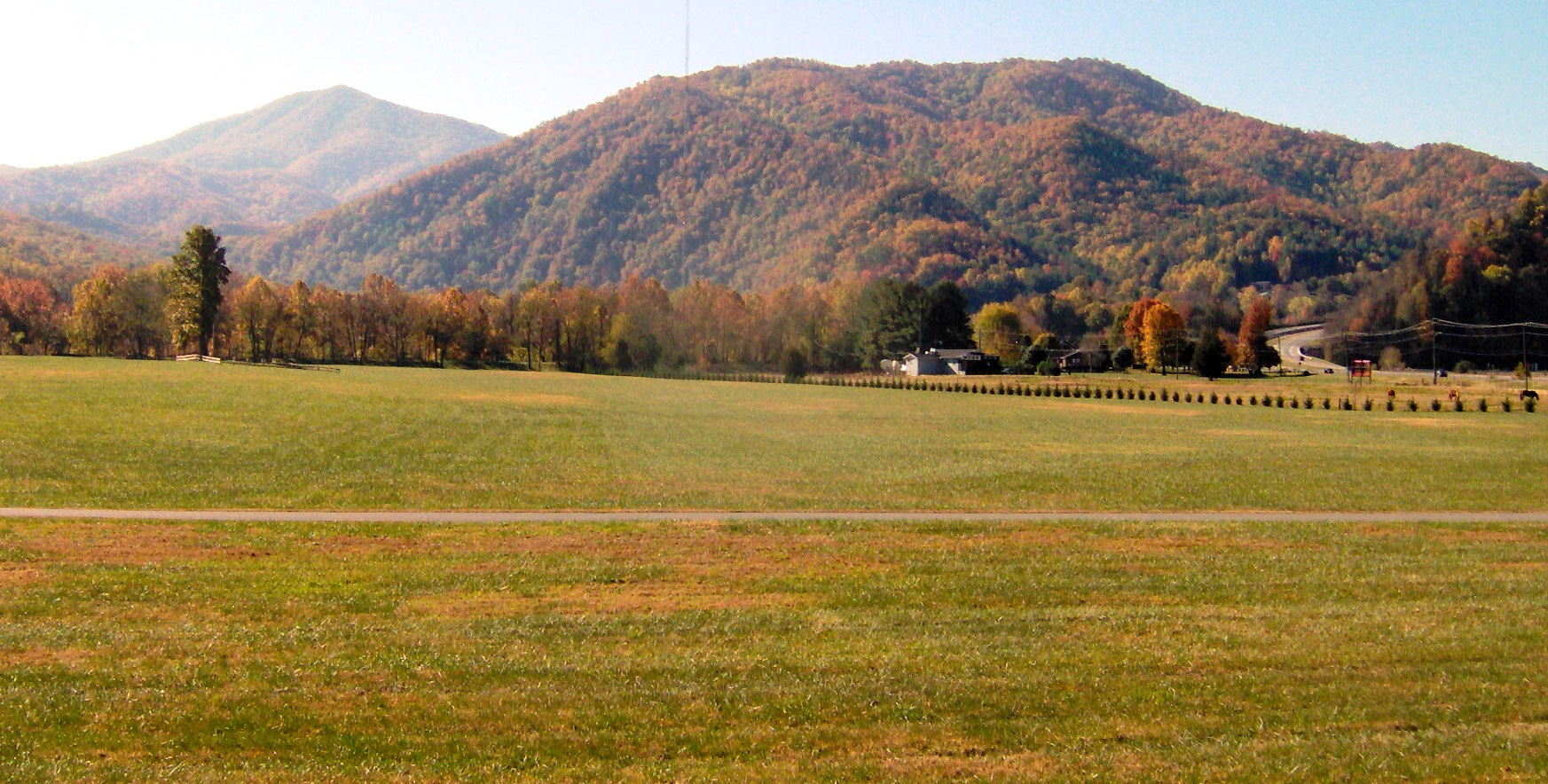
- Bald Mountains near Erwin, Tennessee (Cherokee National Forest)

- Location within Tennessee
- Location: Cherokee National Forest, northeastern Tennessee, United States
- Nearest city: Greeneville and Erwin
- Coordinates: 36.10234°N 82.59856°W
- Area: 10,896 acres (44.09 km^{2})
- Established: 1986
- Governing body: United States Forest Service

Sampson Mountain Wilderness is a federally designated wilderness area in the Cherokee National Forest (Nolichucky/Unaka Ranger District) in northeastern Tennessee. The U.S. Forest Service lists the wilderness at 10,896 acres (44.1 km^{2}). It was designated by Congress in 1986 and expanded in 2018 (the Sampson Mountain Addition). The wilderness spans portions of Greene, Unicoi, and Washington counties and ranges in elevation from about 1,780 to 4,060 feet (540–1,240 m).

== Geography and landscape ==
The wilderness lies within the Bald Mountains region of the Cherokee National Forest, a backcountry area characterized by rugged slopes and limited road access. Sampson Mountain, the wilderness's namesake high point, rises to about 4,060 feet (1,237 m).

The area is cut by steep hollows and ridges drained by multiple clear, rocky streams, with several waterfalls along the drainage network. Forest cover is dominated by mixed pine and hardwoods, including a documented component of older forest (“old growth”) within the designated boundary.

== Ecology ==
Vegetation includes mixed pine–hardwood forest with abundant understory and shrub communities; commonly noted flowering shrubs include mountain laurel, rhododendron, and flame azalea, with diverse wildflower displays seasonally. The wilderness supports black bears and other Appalachian wildlife, and native blueberries are a locally common fruit resource for wildlife and visitors.

Cold, swift streams provide habitat suitable for trout, and the area is described as offering trout fishing in multiple stream reaches.

== Recreation ==
Recreation in the wilderness emphasizes primitive, non-motorized travel consistent with wilderness management. Designated trails include the Squibb Creek Trail (about 2.2 miles (3.5 km) one way) to a waterfall, and the Turkeypen Cove Trail (about a 4-mile (6.4 km) loop when combined with the Middle Spring Ridge Trail), which includes ridge views and steeper climbs.

In the broader Bald Mountains backcountry, the Appalachian Trail follows the Tennessee–North Carolina state line, and the region contains an extensive trail network connecting backcountry destinations and trailheads. Nearby developed recreation areas (outside the wilderness boundary) provide day-use amenities, camping, and additional trail access into the surrounding backcountry landscape.

== Administration and regulations ==
The wilderness is administered by the United States Forest Service. As in other units of the National Wilderness Preservation System, motorized use and “mechanical transport” (including bicycles) are generally prohibited, subject to applicable exceptions and valid existing rights.

== Designation and boundary changes ==
Congress designated the Sampson Mountain Wilderness in 1986 as approximately 8,319 acres, as depicted on the official map referenced in the statute. The 2018 Agriculture Improvement Act added approximately 2,922 acres (the “Sampson Mountain Addition”) to be incorporated into and considered part of the wilderness. The Forest Service has also described a nearby “Sampson Mountain Addition” area in the Bald Mountains region as a recommended wilderness study area in its recreation information for the zone.

Images related to Sampson Mountain Wilderness (context)
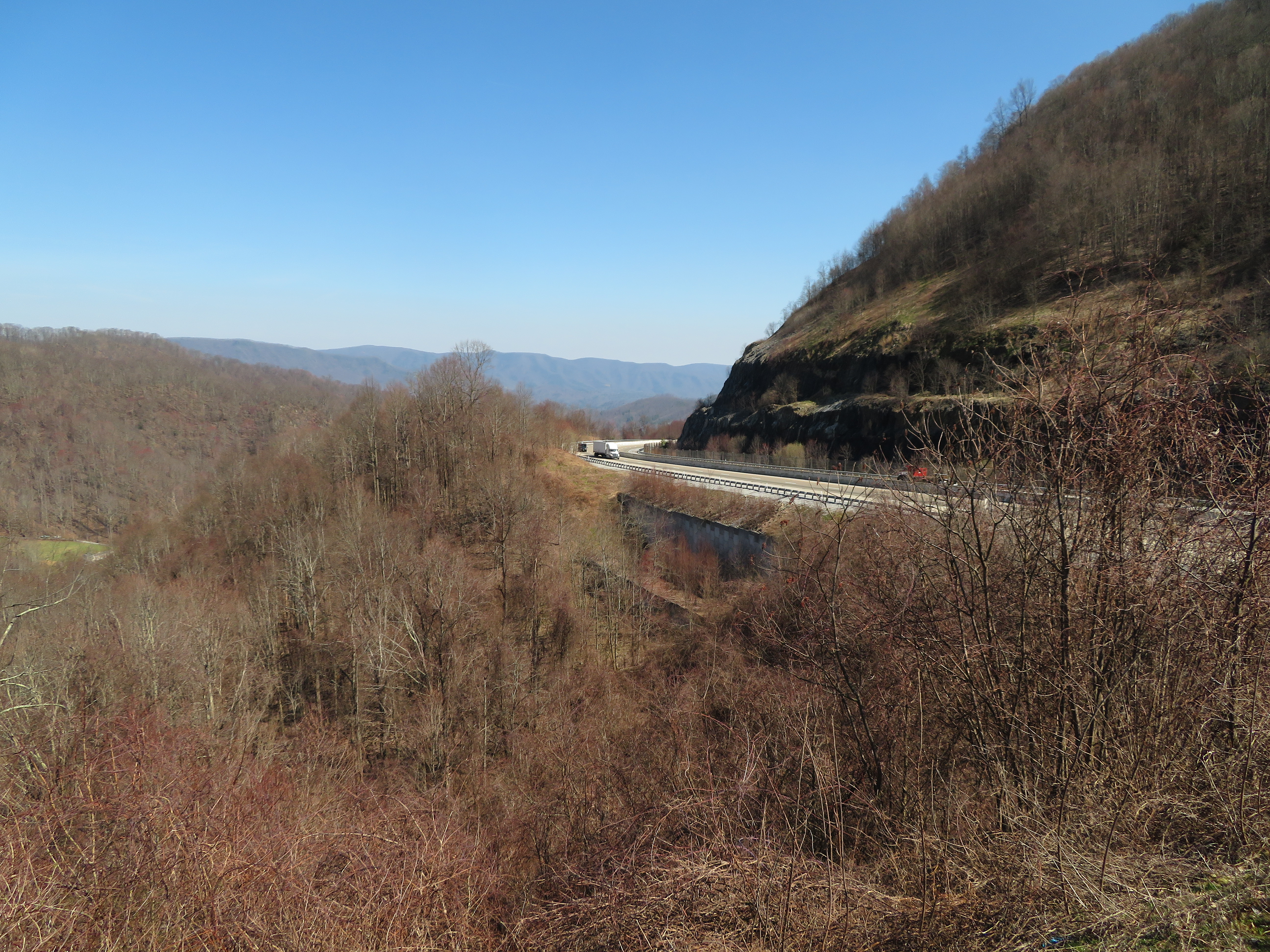
Bald Mountains viewed from I-26 in northeastern Tennessee

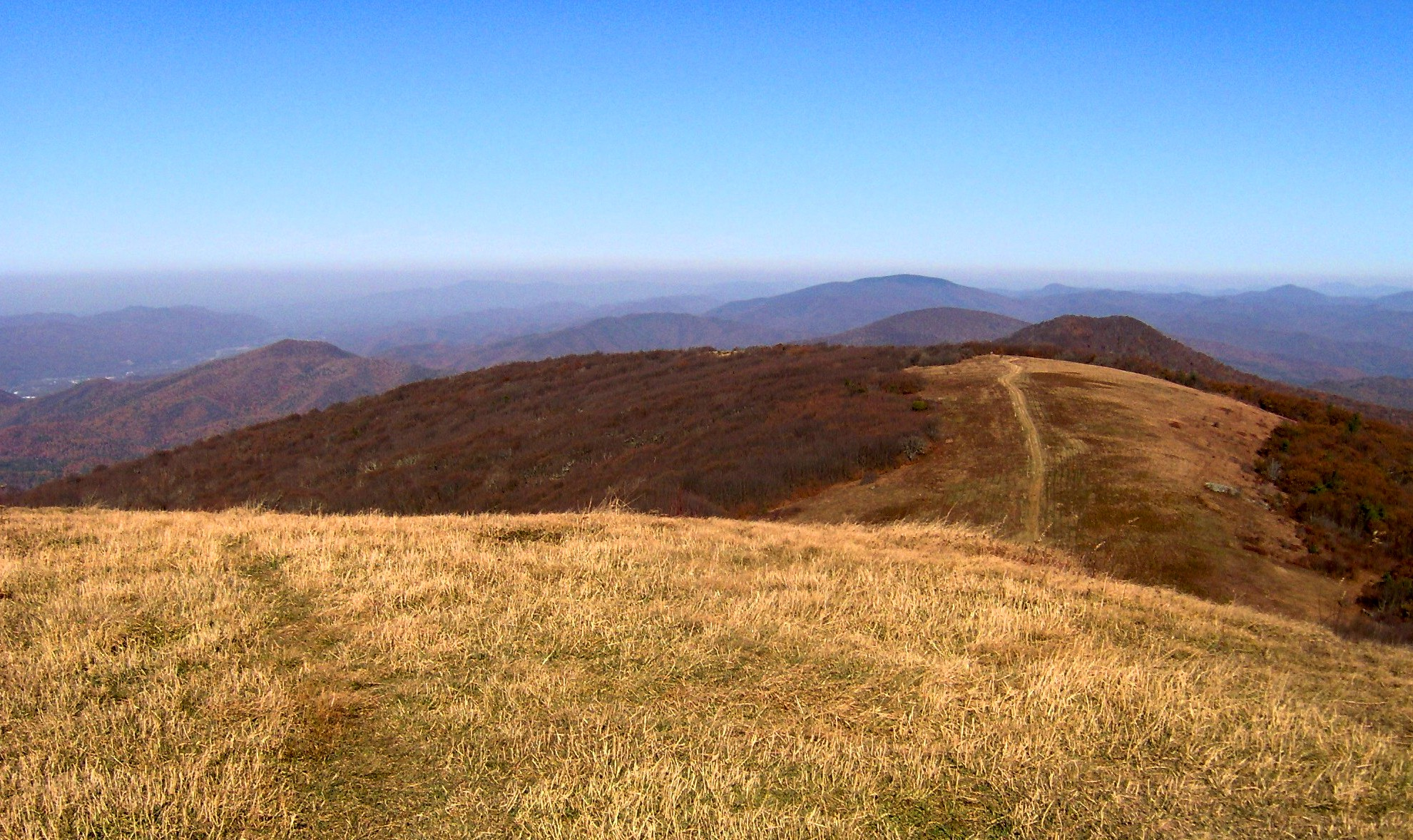
Big Bald (Unaka Range), near the Tennessee–North Carolina line

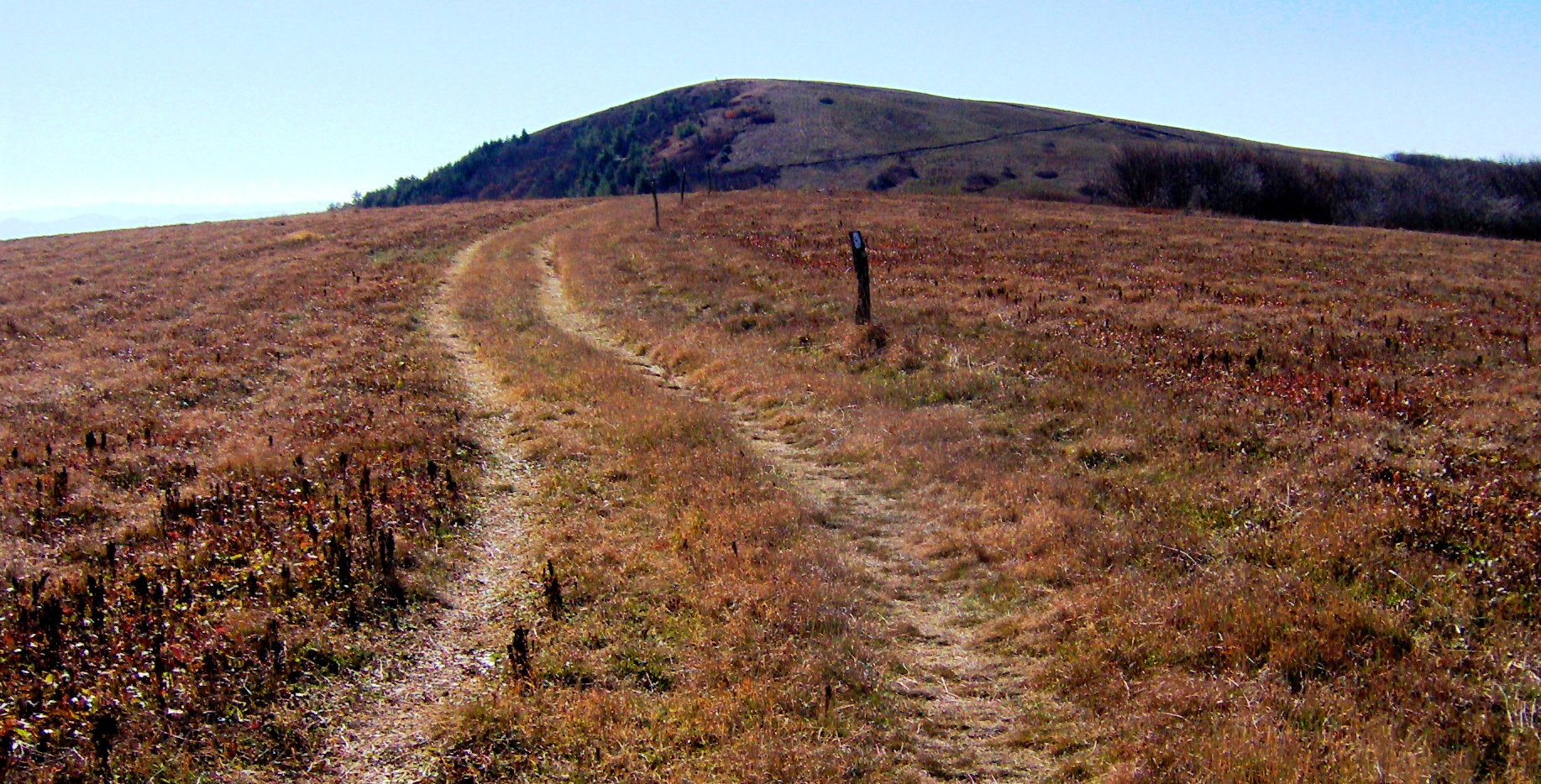
Appalachian Trail on Big Bald

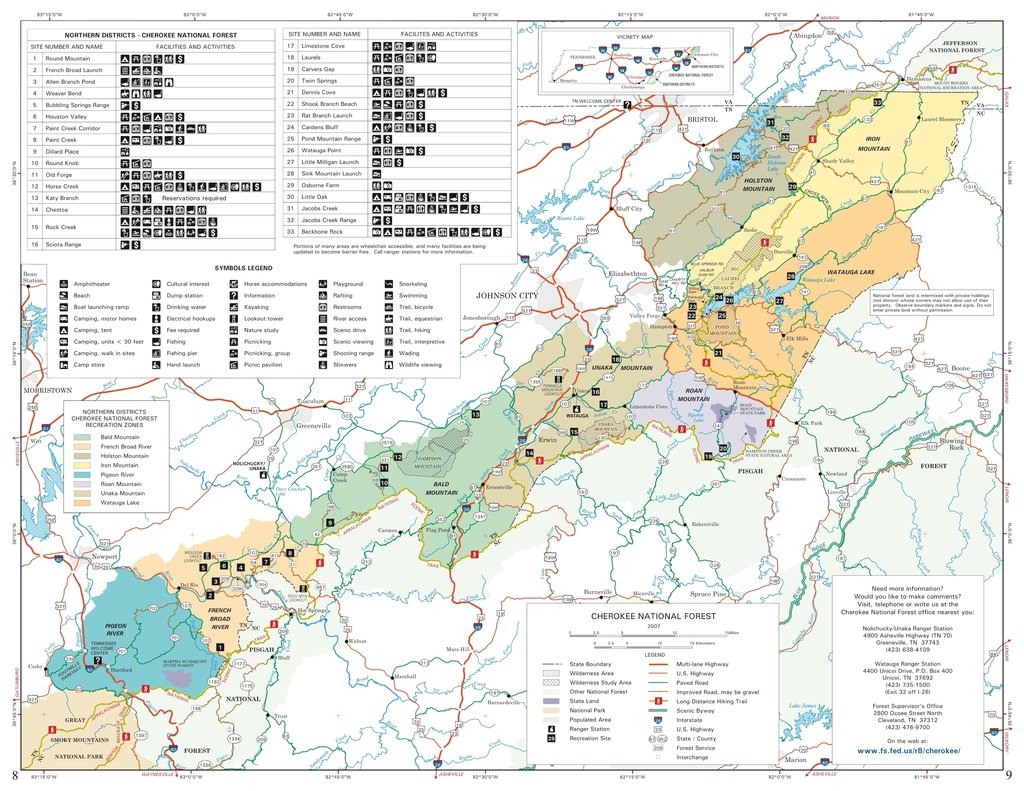
Map of Cherokee National Forest (context map)

== See also ==
- List of wilderness areas in the United States
- Cherokee National Forest
- Big Laurel Branch Wilderness
