= Central Appalachian pine–oak rocky woodland =

Central Appalachian pine–oak rocky woodland is a forest system found in Maine, Vermont, New Hampshire, Massachusetts, Connecticut, New York, New Jersey, Pennsylvania, Ohio, Kentucky, Virginia, Maryland, and West Virginia. It occurs on lower-elevation hilltops, outcrops, and rocky slopes in the central Appalachian Mountains, the Allegheny Plateau, and the northern Piedmont.

== Flora ==
These forests have a patchy or open aspect. Pitch pine (Pinus rigida) and Virginia pine (Pinus virginiana) are common within their respective ranges. These pines are often mixed with dry-site oaks such as chestnut oak (Quercus prinus), bear oak (Quercus ilicifolia), northern red oak (Quercus rubra), and scarlet oak (Quercus coccinea). Sprouts of chestnut (Castanea dentata) can also be found. In the northeast, eastern red-cedar (Juniperus virginiana) or hophornbeam (Ostrya virginiana) are sometimes important. In the understory, some areas have a fairly well-developed heath shrub layer, others a graminoid layer, the latter particularly common under deciduous trees such as oaks.

== Adjacent transitions ==
In the north, this system transitions to the Northern Appalachian-Acadian rocky heath outcrop, where spruce begins to appear. In the south it transitions to Southern Appalachian montane pine forest and woodland, where table mountain pine (Pinus pungens) becomes prominent. It differs from the Central Appalachian dry oak–pine forest by having open, treeless areas, rather than unbroken forest.
