= Big Laurel Branch Wilderness =

Wilderness area

- IUCN category Ib (wilderness area)
- Location within Tennessee Location within the United States
- Location: Carter County, Tennessee
- Nearest city: Elizabethton, Tennessee
- Coordinates: 36.35056°N 82.08694°W
- Area: 6,332 acres (25.62 km^{2})
- Established: 1986
- Governing body: United States Forest Service

Designated by the United States Congress in 1986, the Big Laurel Branch Wilderness is a 6,332-acre (26 km^{2}) wilderness area within Carter County in the U.S. state of Tennessee. The area's elevation is 3,623 feet (1,104 m) above sea level.
