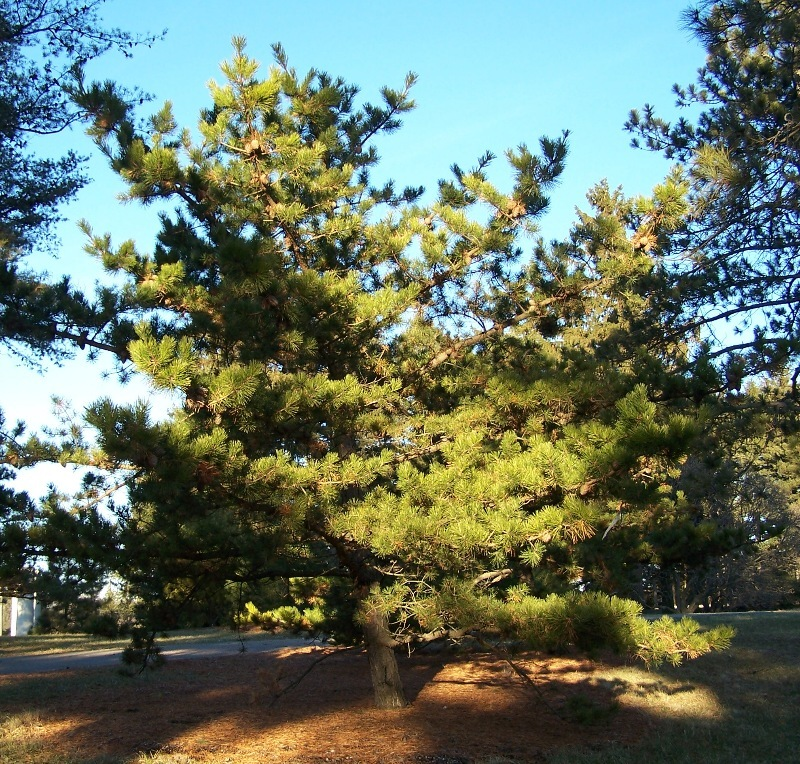
- Cultivated specimen Morton Arboretum acc. 255-86-3

Conservation status
- Least Concern (IUCN 3.1)

Scientific classification
- Kingdom: Plantae
- Clade: Tracheophytes
- Clade: Gymnosperms
- Division: Pinophyta
- Class: Pinopsida
- Order: Pinales
- Family: Pinaceae
- Genus: Pinus
- Subgenus: P. subg. Pinus
- Section: P. sect. Trifoliae
- Subsection: P. subsect. Australes
- Species: P. pungens

Binomial name
- Pinus pungens Lamb.
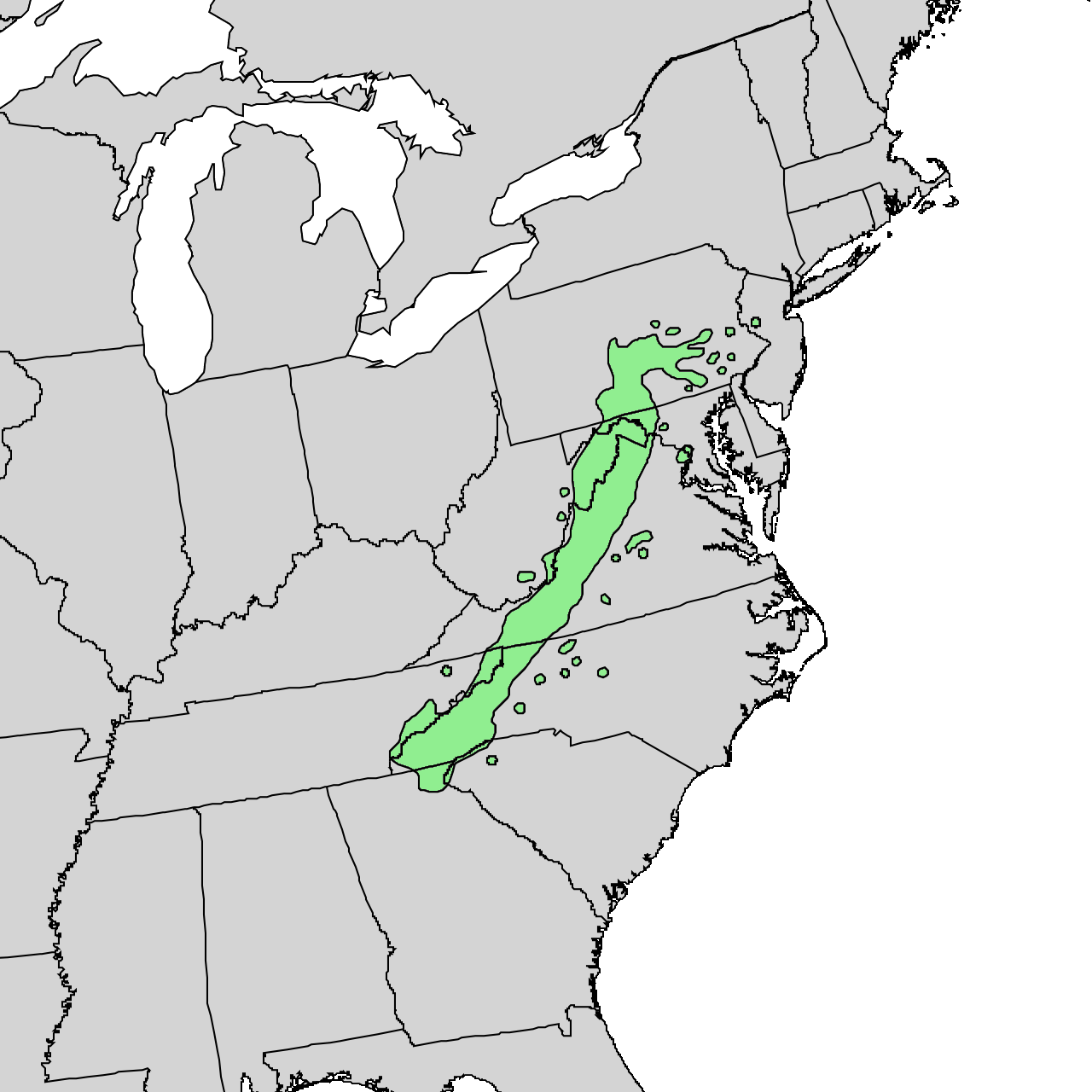
- Natural range

= Table mountain pine =

Table Mountain pine

Species of conifer

Table Mountain pine, Pinus pungens, also called hickory pine, prickly pine, or mountain pine, is a small species of conifer in the family Pinaceae, a pine native to the Appalachian Mountains in the United States.

== Description ==
Pinus pungens is a tree of modest size (6–12 metres or 20–39 feet), and has a rounded, irregular shape. The needles are in bundles of two, occasionally three, yellow-green to mid green, fairly stout, and 4–7 centimetres (1 1/2–3 in) long. The pollen is released early compared to other pines in the area which minimizes hybridization. The cones are very short-stalked (almost sessile), ovoid, pale pinkish to yellowish buff, and 4–9 centimetres (1 1/2–3 1/2 in) long; each scale bears a stout, sharp spine 4–10 millimetres (5/32–25/64 in) long. Sapling trees can bear cones in as little as 5 years.

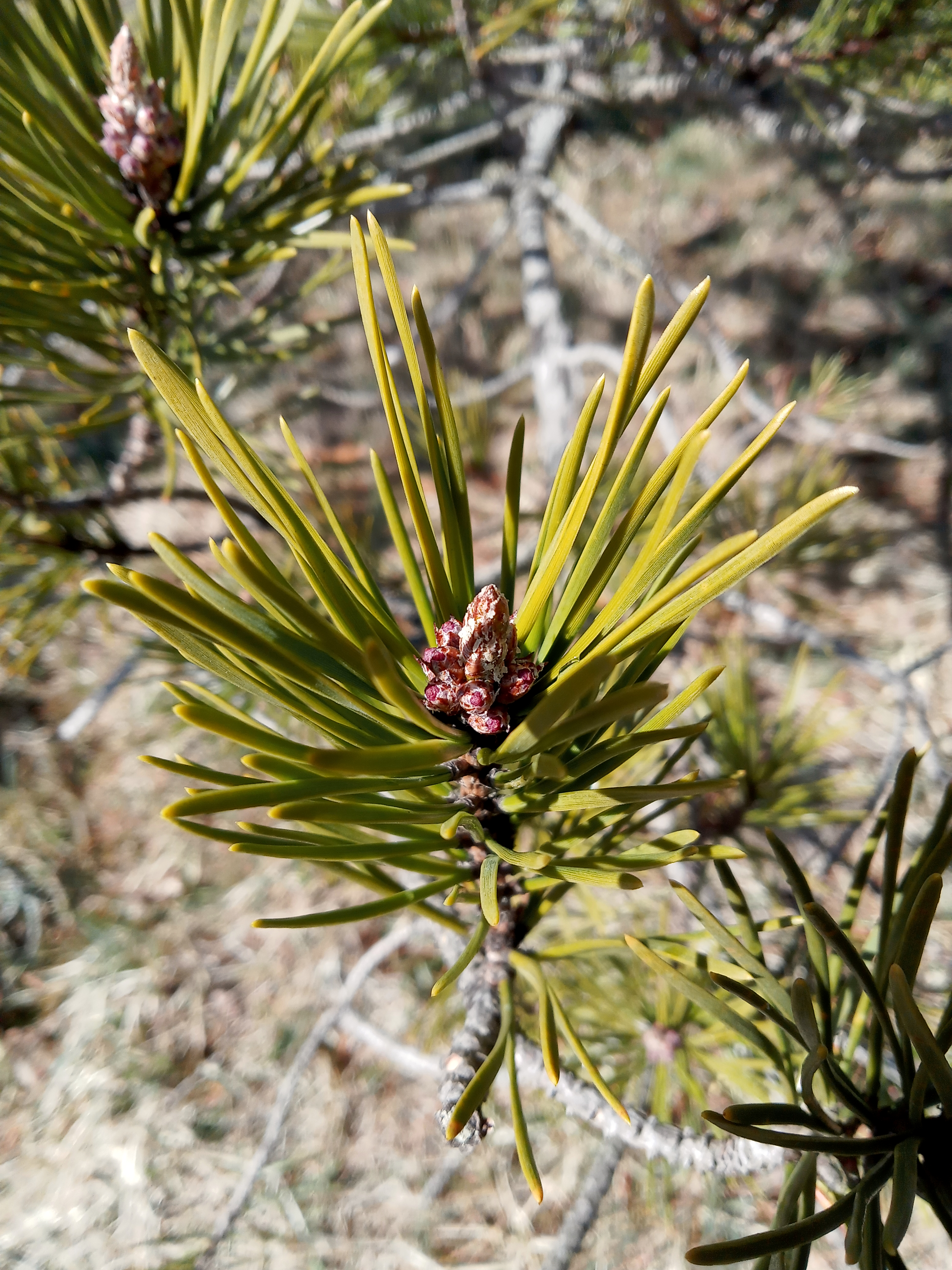
Male cones (pollen cones)

Buds ovoid to cylindric, red-brown, 6–9 millimetres (15/64–23/64 in), resinous.

=== Morphology ===
Pinus pungens is a native, slow-growing conifer. It is often small in stature and exceedingly limby. It rarely grows beyond 66 feet (20 m) tall, though the tallest individual recorded was 95 feet (29 m). Pinus pungens is typically around 16 inches (41 cm) diameter at breast height (DBH). The maximum recorded DBH was 34 inches (86 cm). The trunks of Pinus pungens are often crooked and have irregularly shaped cross-sections. Older trees tend to be flat-topped, while young trees can vary in form from that of a large bush when open-grown, to slender with relatively small limbs when grown in a dense stand. Table Mountain pine typically has long, thick limbs on much of the trunk even in closed canopy stands.

Male cones are 1.5 centimetres (0.59 in) long. Female cones are sessile and range from 4.2 to 10 centimetres (1.7 to 3.9 in) long. Cone scales are tough and armed with broad, upwardly curving spines.

== Taxonomy ==
Pinus pungens was described by British botanist Aylmer Bourke Lambert (1761–1842) in 1805.

== Distribution and habitat ==
=== Distribution ===
Pinus pungens distribution is centered in the Appalachian Mountains of the eastern United States, primarily in the Blue Ridge and Valley-and-Ridge provinces of the Appalachian Highlands. Its range extends from central Pennsylvania, southwest to eastern West Virginia and southward into North Carolina, Tennessee, and the extreme northeast corner of Georgia. There are outlying populations of Pinus pungens to the east of the Appalachians in the piedmont often on isolated peaks and monadnocks

=== Habitat ===
Pinus pungens prefers dry conditions and is mostly found on rocky slopes and peaks, favoring higher elevations averaging of ~300-1700 meters.

== Ecology ==
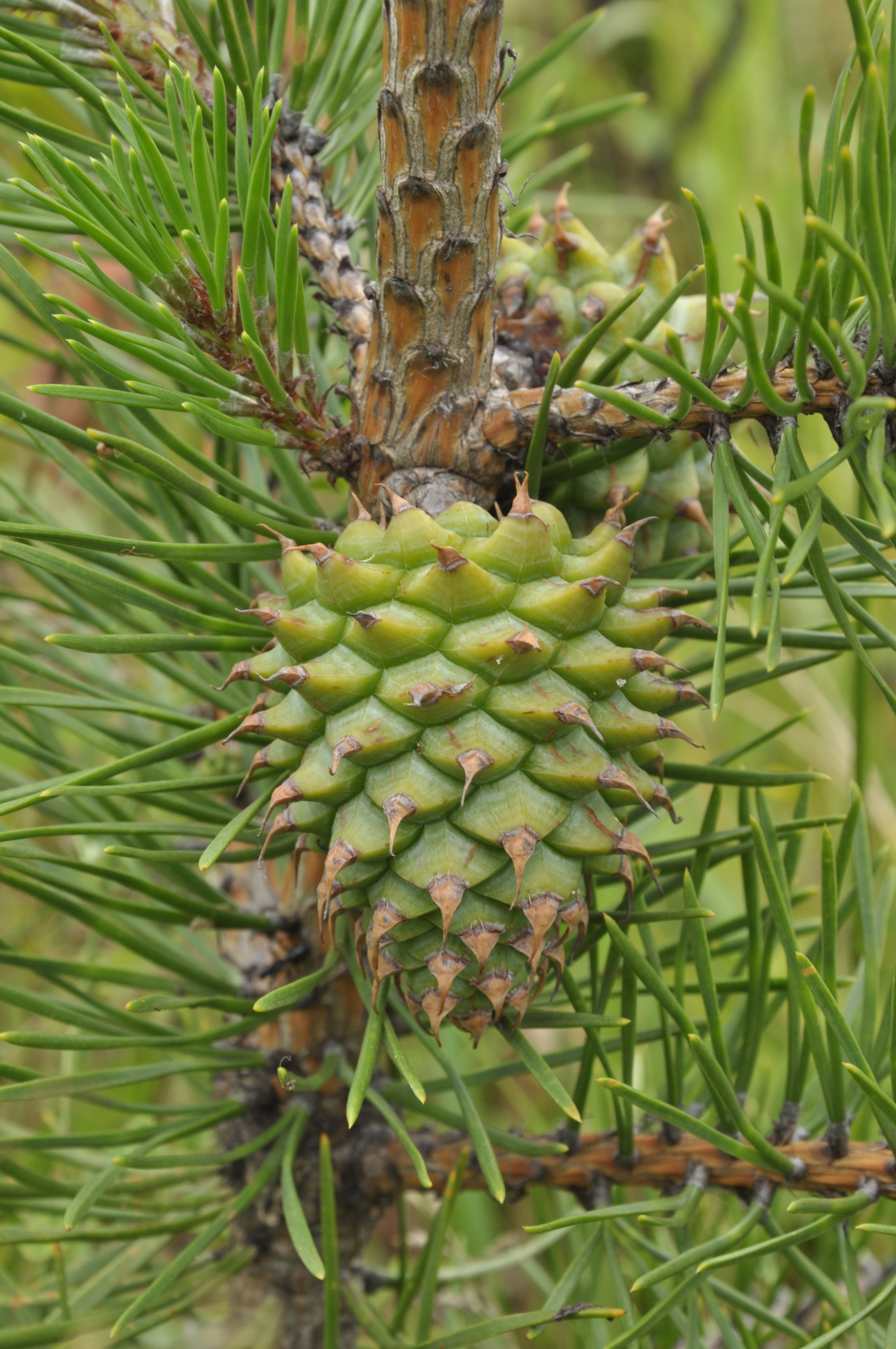
Young female cone

Pinus pungens prefers dry conditions and is mostly found on rocky slopes, rocky knobs, and peaks, favoring higher elevations, from 300–1,760 metres (980–5,770 ft) altitude. It commonly grows as single scattered trees or small groves, not in large forests like most other pines, and needs periodic disturbances for seedling establishment. Throughout the Appalachian Mountain range, P. pungens is a component of conifer-dominated communities along combination with other pine species. The three tallest known Pinus pungens are in Paris Mountain State Park, South Carolina; they are 26.85 to 29.96 metres (88 ft 1 in to 98 ft 4 in) tall.

== Fire ecology ==
Fire histories developed for two Pinus pungens communities in southwestern Virginia revealed that between 1758 and 1944, fires burned approximately every 5 to 10 years during the dormant season. Lack of Pinus pungens and increasing dominance of trees belonging to the Fagaceae (Oaks & Beeches) appear to coincide with fire exclusion practices initiated after 1950 resulting in a lack of regeneration.

=== Fire adaptations ===
Pinus pungens has adaptations to fire that are consistent with both long- and short-return-interval fire regimes. Medium-thick to thick bark, a large rooting habit, self sufficient self-pruning limbs, and pitch/sap production to seal wounds are characteristics of Pinus pungens that suggest it is adapted to survive frequent, low-severity fire up to medium intensity fire. One major adaptation of Pinus pungens to fire are the long dormant serotinous cones that open and spread seeds after high heat exposure.

=== Fire regime ===
Pinus pungens was historically subject to a full range of fire frequencies and types: frequent low-severity surface fires, mixed-severity fires, and stand-replacement fires. Fire occurs infrequently on contemporary Appalachian landscapes where Pinus pungens is common.

Current age structure of Pinus pungens suggest fire is an important influence on stand structure and regeneration as it regulates and clears the land periodically. This can be seen in areas of the Chattahoochee National Forest, Georgia where large Table Mountain pines have not regenerated due to lack of needed conditions to rejuvenate both the soil and trees. Large gaps in year tree classes are the result of fire suppression.

== Conservation status ==
Pinus pungens is considered secure in Virginia and apparently secure in North Carolina, West Virginia, and Pennsylvania. Its considered Vulnerable in Georgia, Critically Imperiled in New Jersey, and Exotic in Illinois.
