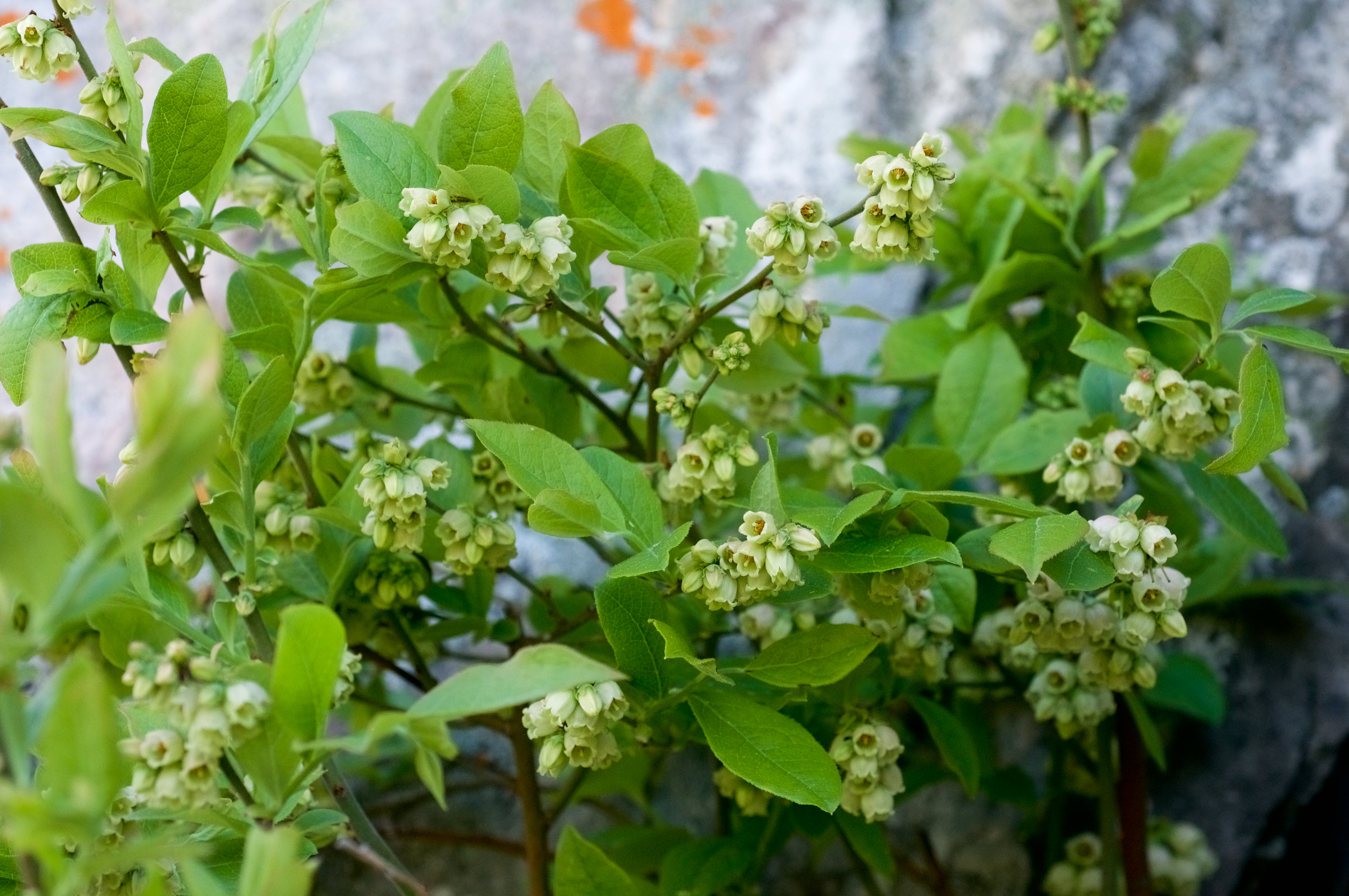

Conservation status
- Secure (NatureServe)

Scientific classification
- Kingdom: Plantae
- Clade: Tracheophytes
- Clade: Angiosperms
- Clade: Eudicots
- Clade: Asterids
- Order: Ericales
- Family: Ericaceae
- Genus: Vaccinium
- Section: Vaccinium sect. Cyanococcus
- Species: V. pallidum

Binomial name
- Vaccinium pallidum Aiton 1789

Synonyms
- Synonymy: Cyanococcus liparis Small; Cyanococcus margarettae (Ashe) Small; Cyanococcus pallidus (Aiton) Small; Cyanococcus subcordatus Small; Cyanococcus tallapusae Coville ex Small; Cyanococcus vacillans] (Kalm ex Torrey) Rydberg; Vaccinium altomontanum] Ashe; Vaccinium corymbosum var. pallidum (Aiton) A. Gray; Vaccinium margarettae Ashe; Vaccinium vacillans Kalm ex Torrey; Vaccinium vacillans var. crinitum Fernald; Vaccinium vacillans var. missouriense Ashe; Vaccinium viride Ashe

= Vaccinium pallidum =

Berry and plant

Vaccinium pallidum is a species of flowering plant in the heath family known by the common names hillside blueberry, Blue Ridge blueberry, late lowbush blueberry, and early lowbush blueberry. It is native to central Canada and the central and eastern United States.

== Description ==
Vaccinium pallidum is a deciduous shrub, erect in stature but variable in height. It generally grows 23 to 51 centimeters (9 to 20 in) tall, but depending on environmental conditions it ranges from 8 cm (3 1/4 in) to 1 metre (3 ft 3 in) in height. It is colonial, sprouting from its rhizome to form colonies of clones. The shrub has greenish brown to red bark on its stems, and the smaller twigs may be green, reddish, yellowish, or gray. The alternately arranged leaves are also variable. They are generally roughly oval and measure 2 to 6 cm (3/4 to 2 1/4 in) long. They are green to yellowish or bluish in color, turning red in the fall.

The flowers are cylindrical, bell-shaped, or urn-shaped and are borne in racemes of up to 11. They are white to pinkish or greenish in color, or "greenish white with pink striping", and about 0.5–1 cm (1/4–3/8 in) long. They are pollinated by bees such as bumblebees and Andrena carlini. The fruit is a berry up to 1.2 cm (1/2 in) long. It is waxy blue to shiny black in color, or rarely pure white. It contains several seeds, a few of which are generally not viable. The plant reproduces sexually via seed and vegetatively by sprouting from the rhizome. Cytology is 2n = 24, 48.

== Distribution and habitat ==
Vaccinium pallidum is native to central Canada (Ontario) and the central and eastern United States (from Maine west to Wisconsin and south as far as Georgia and Louisiana) plus the Ozarks of Missouri, Arkansas, southeastern Kansas and eastern Oklahoma.

It grows in many types of habitat, including oak and chestnut woodlands, maple-dominated swamps, pine barrens, pine savanna, and a variety of forest types. It grows in the understory of trees such as red oak, black oak, white oak, post oak, chestnut oak, blackjack oak, Virginia pine, shortleaf pine, pitch pine, loblolly pine, longleaf pine, jack pine, eastern hemlock, red maple, and black cherry.

Vaccinium pallidum is common on disturbed sites such as roadsides and abandoned fields. It also grows at climax in old-growth oak stands in the South Carolina piedmont. It can grow on dry, rocky soils, sandy and gravelly soils, and heavy clay. The climate is generally humid.

== Uses ==
The wild fruits are food for many types of bird and other animals. Each individual fruit has approximately eight calories. For humans the taste is "sweet to bland" and the fruit can be eaten fresh, in pies, or as jelly. The fruit is harvested and sold commercially in some areas, such as northeastern Alabama and northwestern Georgia. The plant is also grown as an ornamental.
