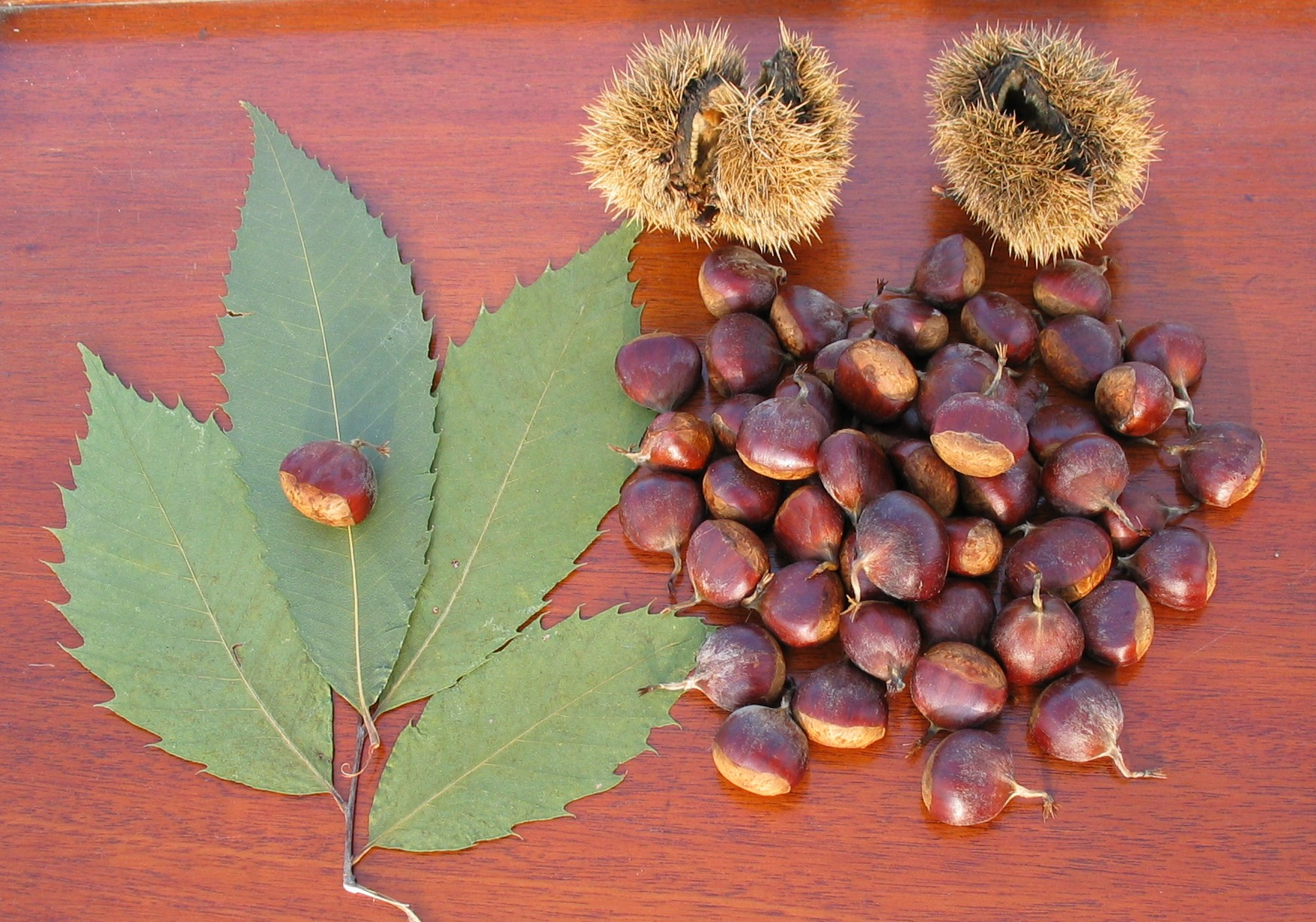
- American chestnut leaves and nuts

Conservation status
- Critically Endangered (IUCN 3.1)

- Vulnerable (NatureServe)

Scientific classification
- Kingdom: Plantae
- Clade: Tracheophytes
- Clade: Angiosperms
- Clade: Eudicots
- Clade: Rosids
- Order: Fagales
- Family: Fagaceae
- Genus: Castanea
- Species: C. dentata

Binomial name
- Castanea dentata (Marsh.) Borkh.
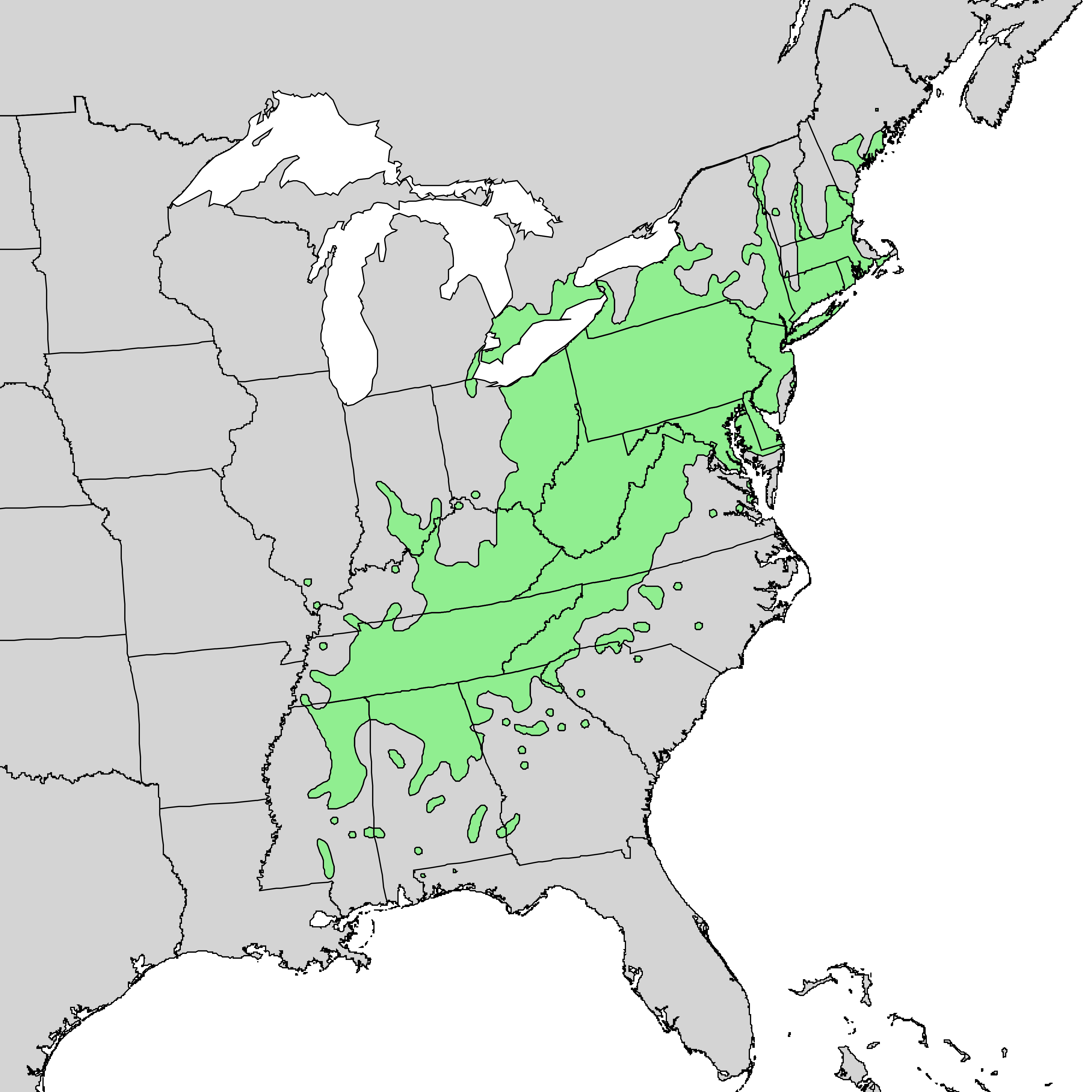
- The natural range of Castanea dentata

= American chestnut =

Species of chestnut tree

The American chestnut (Castanea dentata) is a large, fast-growing deciduous tree of the beech family native to eastern North America. As is true of all species in the genus Castanea, the American chestnut produces burred fruit with edible nuts. The American chestnut was once common in the Appalachian Mountain range and was a dominant species in the oak-chestnut forest region of its central and southern range.

During the early to mid-20th century, American chestnut trees were devastated by chestnut blight, a fungal disease that came from Japanese chestnut trees that were introduced into North America from Japan. It is estimated that the blight killed between three and four billion American chestnut trees in the first half of the 20th century, beginning in 1904. Four mature American chestnuts exist within its former range, although many stumps and root systems continue to send up saplings. Most of these saplings get infected by chestnut blight, which girdles and kills them before they attain maturity. There are hundreds of large (2 to 5 ft (0.6 to 1.5 m) in diameter) American chestnuts outside its historical range, some in areas where less virulent strains of the pathogen are more common, such as the 600 to 800 large trees in Northern Michigan. The species is listed as endangered in Canada under the Species at Risk Act. American chestnuts are also susceptible to ink disease, particularly in the southern part of its native range; this likely contributed to the devastation of the species.

Several groups are attempting to create blight-resistant American chestnuts. Scientists at the SUNY College of Environmental Science and Forestry created the Darling 58 cultivar by inserting the oxalate oxidase gene from wheat into the genome of an American chestnut. When expressed in the vascular cambium of the Darling 58 cultivar, the oxalate oxidase enzyme degrades the oxalic acid produced by the chestnut blight, reducing damage to the vascular cambium and resisting girdling of the trunk. As of 2021, the researchers who developed this cultivar are working toward applying for government permission to make these trees available to the public. If approved, these chestnut trees would be the first genetically modified forest trees released into the wild in the United States. Alternate approaches to developing a blight-resistant cultivar include cross-breeding among partially blight-resistant American chestnuts or crossbreeding with the moderately blight-resistant Chinese chestnut, then backcrossing with the American chestnut, with the goal of retaining most of its genes.

== Description ==
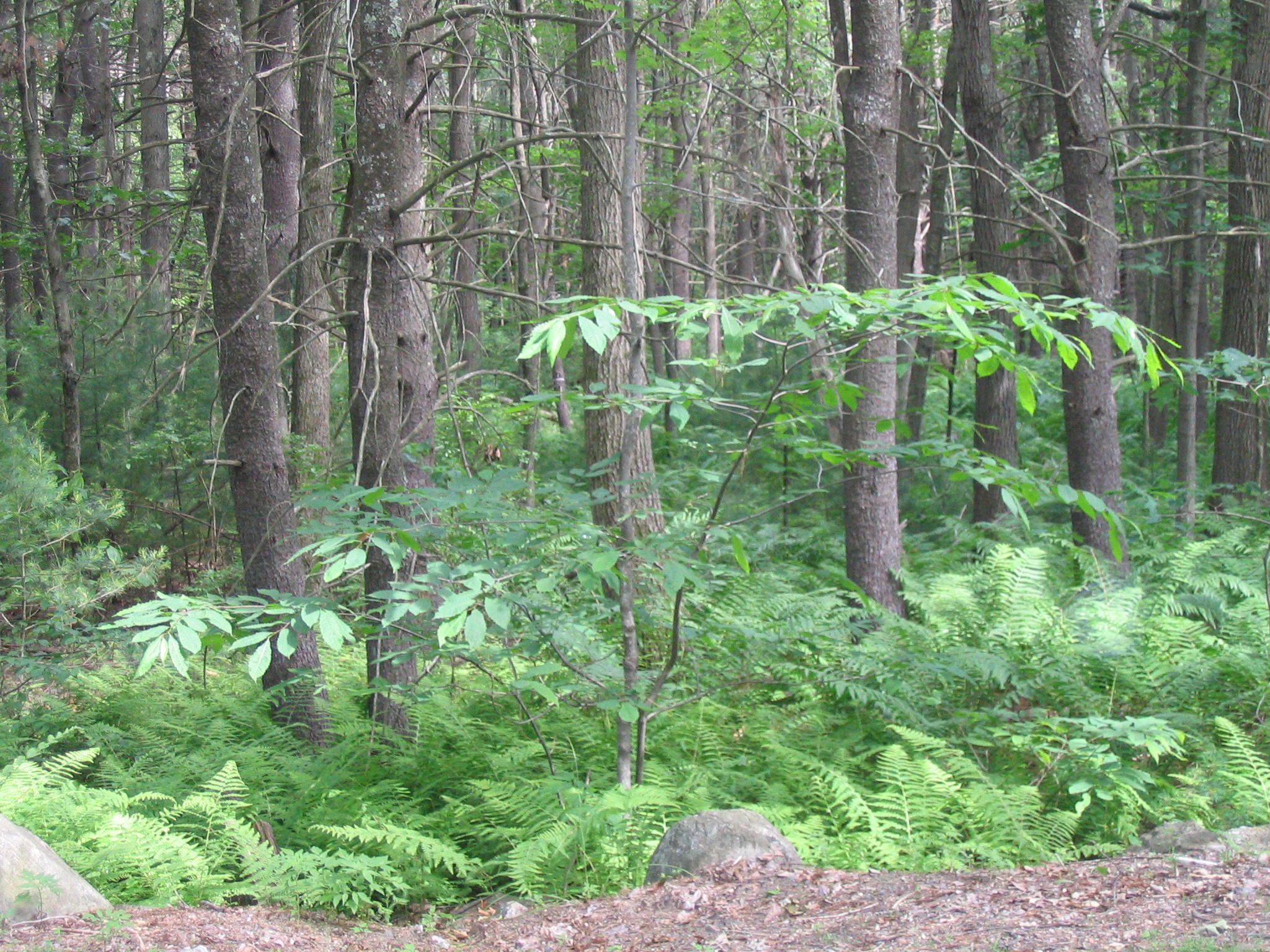
A young chestnut tree in its natural habitat

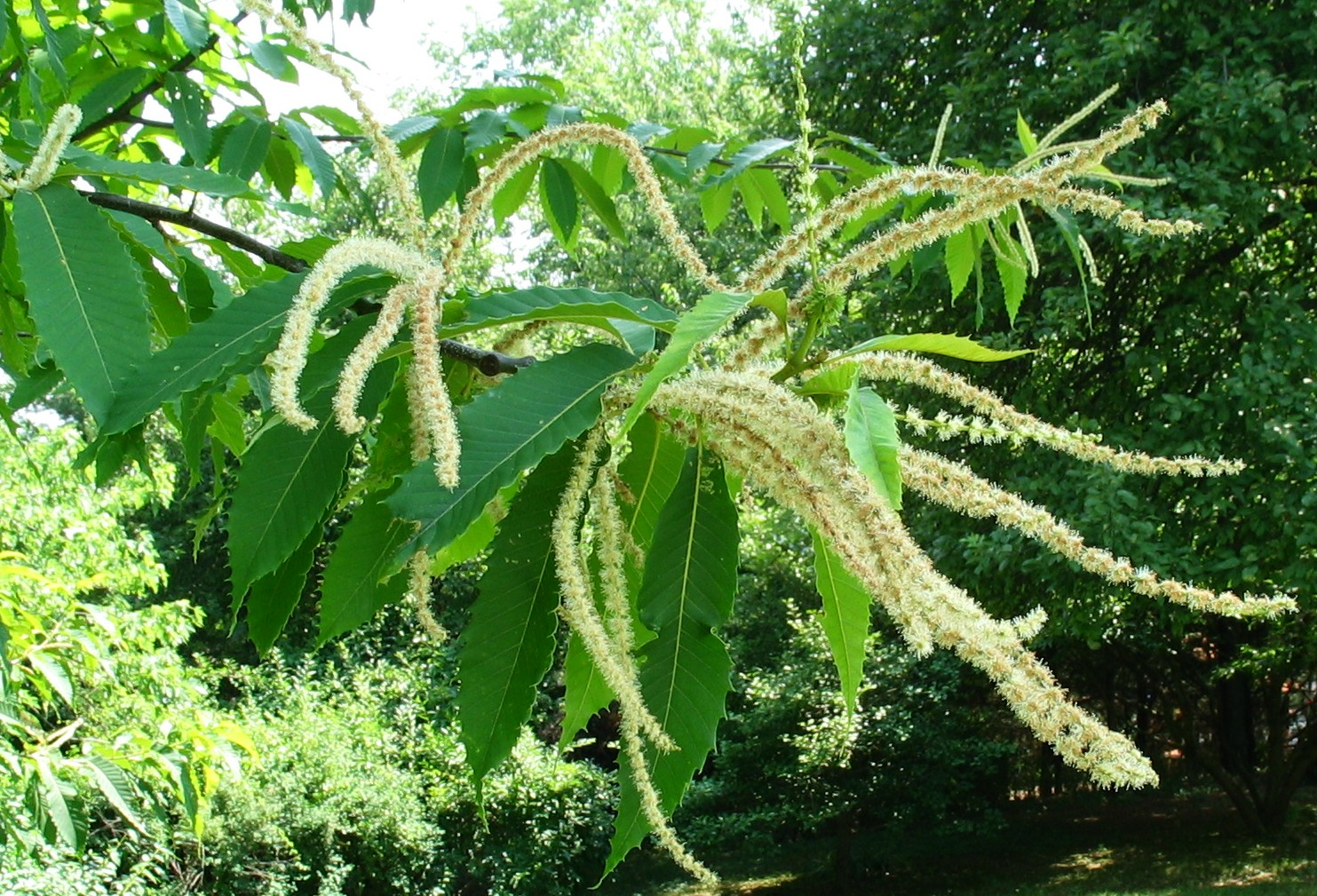
American chestnut male (pollen) catkins

Castanea dentata is a large, rapidly-growing, deciduous hardwood eudicot tree. A singular specimen manifest in Maine has attained a height of 115 feet (35 m). Pre-blight sources give a maximum height of 100 feet (30 m) and a maximum diameter of 13 feet (4.0 m). Post-blight sources erroneously report a greater maximum size of the species compared with pre-blight, likely the result of nostalgia, interpretations of pre-blight measurements of circumference as being measurements of diameter, and the misapprehension that pre-blight observations of maximum size represented observations of average size. It is considerably larger than the closely related Allegheny chinquapin (Castanea pumila).

There are several other chestnut species, such as the European sweet chestnut (C. sativa), Chinese chestnut (C. mollissima), and Japanese chestnut (C. crenata). Castanea dentata can be distinguished by a few morphological traits, such as petiole length, nut size and number of nuts per burr, leaf shape, and leaf size, with leaves being 14–20 cm (5.5–8 in) long and 7–10 cm (3–4 in) broad—slightly shorter and broader than the sweet chestnut. It has larger and more widely spaced saw-teeth on the edges of its leaves, as indicated by the scientific name dentata, Latin for "toothed".

The European sweet chestnut was introduced in the United States by Thomas Jefferson in 1773. The European sweet chestnut has hairy twig tips in contrast to the hairless twigs of the American chestnut. This species has been the chief source of commercial chestnuts in the United States. Japanese chestnut was inadvertently introduced into the United States by Thomas Hogg in 1876 and planted on the property of S. B. Parsons in Flushing, New York. The Japanese chestnut has narrow leaves, smaller than either American chestnut or sweet chestnut, with small, sharply-pointed teeth and many hairs on the underside of the leaf and is the most blight-resistant species.

The chestnut is monoecious, and usually protandrous producing many small, pale green (nearly white) male flowers found tightly occurring along 6 to 8 inch long catkins. The female parts are found near the base of the catkins (near twig) and appear in late spring to early summer. Like all members of the family Fagaceae, American chestnut is self-incompatible and requires two trees for pollination, which can be with other members of the Castanea genus. The pollen is considered a mild allergen.

The American chestnut is a prolific bearer of nuts, with inflorescence and nut production in the wild beginning when a tree is 8 to 10 years old. Burrs often open while still attached to the tree, around the time of the first frost in autumn, with the nuts then falling to the ground. American chestnut typically have three nuts enclosed in a spiny, green burr, each lined in a tan velvet. In contrast, the Allegheny chinquapin produces one nut per burr.

== Evolution and ecology ==
Chestnuts are in the Fagaceae family along with beech and oak. Chestnuts are not closely related to the horse chestnut, which is in the family Sapindaceae. Phylogenetic analysis indicates a westward migration of extant Castanea species from Asia to Europe to North America, with the American chestnut more closely related to the Allegheny chinquapin (Castanea pumila v. pumila) than to European or Asian clades. The genomic range of chestnuts can be roughly divided into a clinal pattern of northeast, central, and southwest populations, with southwest populations showing greatest diversity, reflecting an evolutionary bottleneck likely caused by Quaternary glaciation.

Two lineages of American chestnut have been identified, one a hybrid between the American chestnut and the Allegheny chinquapin from the southern Appalachians. The other lineage shows a gradual loss of genetic diversity along a northward vector, indicating possible expansion of range following the most recent glacial maximum during the Wisconsin glaciation. Ozark chinkapin (C. ozarkensis), which is typically considered either a distinct species or a subspecies of the Allegheny chinquapin (C. pumila subsp. ozarkensis), may be ancestral to both the American chestnut and the Allegheny chinquapin. A natural hybrid of C. dentata and C. pumila has been named Castanea × neglecta.

The American chestnut population was reduced to 1–10% of its original size as a result of the chestnut blight and has not recovered. The surviving trees are "frozen in time" with shoots re-sprouting from survivor rootstock but almost entirely undergoing blight-induced dieback without producing chestnuts. Unexpectedly, American chestnut appears to have retained substantial genetic diversity following the population bottleneck, which is at odds with the limited incidence of blight resistance/tolerance in extant populations.

The pre-blight distribution was restricted to moist, well-drained, steep slopes with acidic loam soils. According to analysis of old forest dust data, the tree was rare or absent in New England prior to 2,500 years before present but rapidly established dominance in these forests, becoming a common tree over a range from Maine and southern Ontario to Mississippi, and from the Atlantic coast to the Appalachian Mountains and the Ohio Valley. Within its range, the American chestnut was the dominant timber of mountain ridges and sandstone soils. Along the Blue Ridge Mountains of North Carolina, it dominated the area above the range of the Eastern hemlock and below 1,500 meters. In Western Maryland, it comprised 50% of ridge timber and 36% of forested slopes.

The tree's abundance was the result of a combination of rapid growth, relative fire resistance, and a large annual nut crop, in comparison to oaks, which do not reliably produce sizable numbers of acorns every year. Historically, the mean fire return interval was 20 years or less in chestnut-predominant ecologies, with a forest stand pattern that was more open than is currently the case.

The American chestnut was an important tree for wildlife, providing much of the fall mast for species such as white-tailed deer, wild turkey, Allegheny woodrat and (prior to its extinction) the passenger pigeon. Black bears were also known to eat the nuts to fatten up for the winter. The tree contains more nitrogen, phosphorus, potassium, and magnesium in its leaves than other trees that share its habitat, so they return more nutrients to the soil which helps with the growth of other plants, animals, and microorganisms. The American chestnut is preferred by some avian seed hoarders and was particularly important as a food source during years where the oak mast failed. The functional extinction of the American chestnut was thought to have resulted in the extinction of the tree's host-specialist insect, the greater chestnut weevil, until the beetle was rediscovered in 2025. Similarly, the chestnut casebearer moth, thought extinct, was rediscovered in 2020.

== Parasites ==
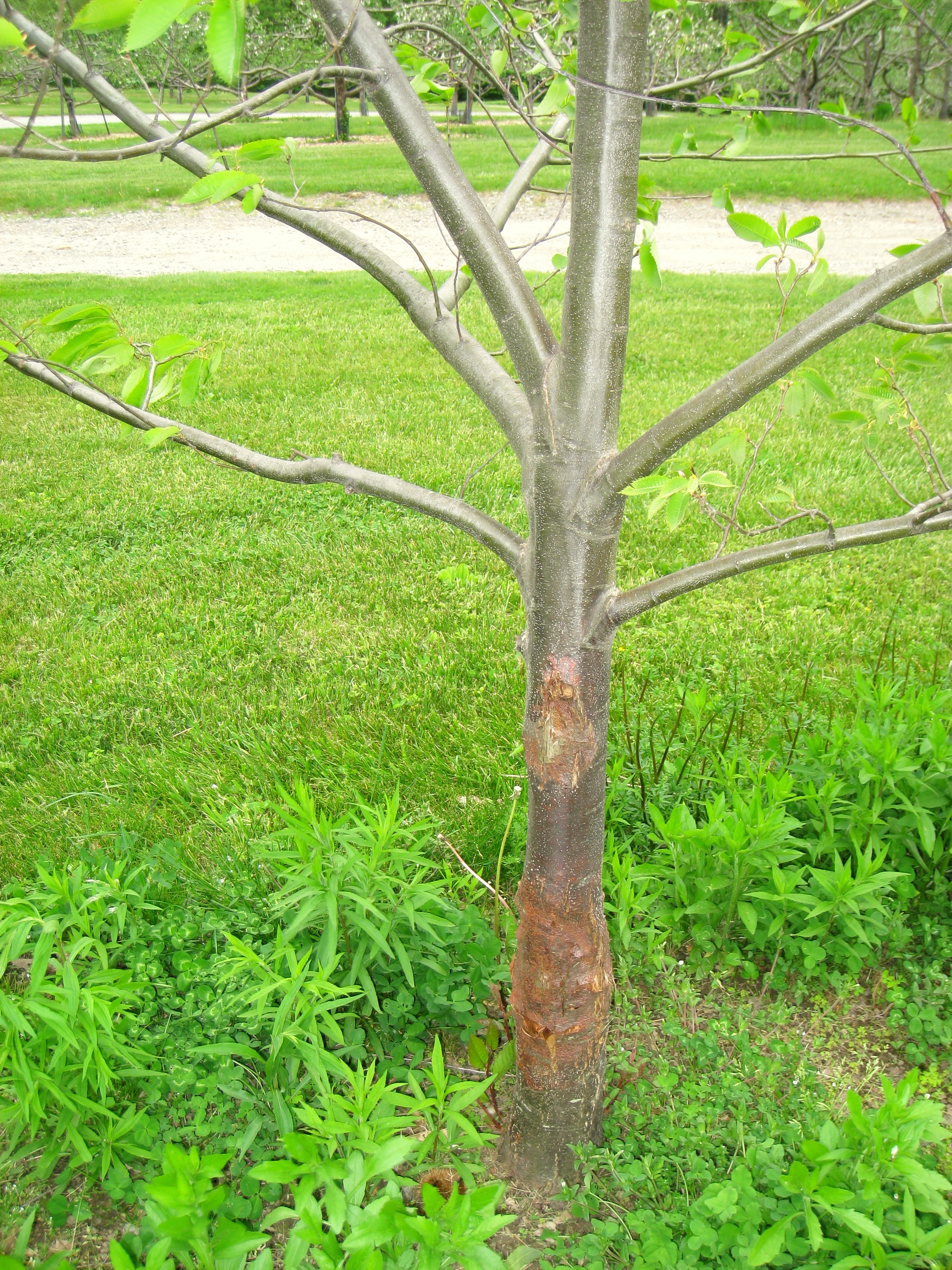
Chestnut blight affecting a young American chestnut

The appearance of invasive pathogens of the American Chestnut into the eastern deciduous forest ecosystem is just one instance of the Columbian exchange of pathogens. While the Columbian exchange moved valuable crops between the Americas, Europe and Asia, there was also a downside, as the rapid introduction of invasive and unfamiliar pathogens resulted in serious damage or extinction of some host species.

=== Chestnut blight ===
Prior to the chestnut blight, the American chestnut was a dominant tree in the ecosystem of the eastern deciduous forest. It was said that a squirrel could walk from New England to Georgia solely on the branches of American chestnuts. Once an important hardwood timber tree, the American chestnut suffered a catastrophic population collapse due to the chestnut blight, a vascular disease caused by an Asian bark fungus (Cryphonectria parasitica, formerly Endothia parasitica). The fungus was introduced when infected Japanese chestnut trees were brought to North America in the late 19th century.

Chestnut blight was first noticed on American chestnut trees in what was then the New York Zoological Park, now known as the Bronx Zoo, in the borough of The Bronx, New York City, in 1904, by chief forester Hermann Merkel. Merkel estimated that by 1906 blight had infected 98 percent of the chestnut trees in the borough. While Asian chestnut species evolved with the blight and developed a strong resistance, the American chestnut and Allegheny chinquapin have little resistance.

The airborne bark fungus spread 50 mi (80 km) per year and in a few decades girdled and killed more than three billion American chestnut trees. Salvage logging during the early years of the blight may have unwittingly destroyed trees that had high levels of resistance to the disease and thus aggravated the calamity. New shoots often sprout from the roots when the main stem dies, so the species has not yet become extinct. However, the stump sprouts rarely reach more than 6 m (20 ft) in height before blight infection returns, so the species is classified as functionally extinct since the chestnut blight only actively kills the above ground portion of the American chestnut tree, leaving behind the below-ground components such as the root systems.

In the 1900s, it was recorded that the chestnut blight would commonly reinfect any novel stems that grew from the stumps, therefore maintaining a cycle that would prevent the American chestnut tree from re-establishing. However, some American chestnut trees have survived because of a small natural resistance to the chestnut blight.

The high density of American chestnuts within its range and the lack of natural immunity allowed the blight to spread quickly and cause infection and die-off in nearly every tree exposed. Early attempts to treat chestnut blight were both chemical, such as the use of fungicides, and physical, such as removing infected limbs through tree surgery and the removal of infected trees from cultivated and wild stands. Quarantine measures were also put into place, with the later support of the Plant Quarantine Act, which was an attempt to prevent the importation of other potential plant pathogens.

These attempts to contain the spread of chestnut blight were unsuccessful. The devastation of the species was worsened because the chestnut blight resulted in isolation of remaining specimens, resulting in asexual propagation of many isolated American chestnuts, low genetic diversity of stands of American chestnuts, and consequent vulnerability to extirpation.

Chestnut blight is not to be confused with sun scald, where winter sun reflects off of snow, warming the bark on the sun-facing trunk (this is the south-facing trunk in the Northern Hemisphere). This snow-reflected sunlight repeatedly warms and thaws the trunk during the day, resulting in vulnerability of the bark and cambium to freezing cold temperatures during the subsequent night, eventually resulting in bark cankers that resemble chestnut blight. Also, sun scald makes the damaged bark vulnerable to invasion by pathogens.

=== Oak wilt ===
All chestnut species, including the American chestnut, are vulnerable to oak wilt – a vascular disease that occludes xylem vessels with tyloses, gums, and fungal hyphae. Oak wilt can kill chestnuts within weeks.

=== Ink disease ===
Before the onset of chestnut blight and prior to 1824, an epidemic of ink disease struck American chestnuts, most likely brought to the southern United States on Cork oak trees imported from Portugal. This fungal pathogen is known to also kill the roots and collars of several Castanea species, including the European sweet chestnut. It affected primarily chestnuts in the Southeastern US and at the later time when chestnut blight struck, the range of C. dentata may have already been reduced. The potential range of blight-resistant American chestnuts is substantially reduced if those chestnuts are susceptible to ink disease.

The range of this pathogen will extend northward as the climate warms, which may further limit the potential range of the American chestnut. Potassium phosphonate has been found to induce resistance to infection of C. sativa by both inhibiting Phytophthora species directly and by improving the host response, inducing resistance to lesions in phloem tissue and formation of callus. Whether or not this effect would occur in C. dentata is uncertain.

=== Chestnut brown nut rot ===
Brown nut rot is a destructive plant disease caused by the primary agent Gnomoniopsis castaneae and afflicting Castanea species. This pathogen also causes mild disease or exists as an endophyte in other hardwoods. The disease is found in Europe and Oceania. More recently, it has been reported in North America.

=== Chinese gall wasp ===
The Chinese gall wasp attacks all chestnut species and causes heavy damage. As this species of wasp is a threat to saplings, and is now widely-present in eastern North American forests, it is a potential problem for reintroduction of the American chestnut. The Chinese parasitoid chalcid wasp Torymus sinensis Kamijo is considered an effective control method for the Chinese gall wasp. There are now established populations of Torymus sinensis in North America.

== Reduced population ==
American chestnuts were a common part of the forest canopy in much of its original range. Although large trees are currently rare east of the Mississippi River, they exist in pockets in the blight-free West, where the habitat was agreeable for planting: settlers took seeds with them in the 19th century. Huge planted chestnut trees can be found in Sherwood, Oregon, as the Mediterranean climate of the West Coast discourages the fungus, which relies on hot, humid summer weather. American chestnut also thrives as far north as Revelstoke, British Columbia.

At present, it is believed that survival of C. dentata for more than a decade in its native range is almost impossible. The fungus uses various oak trees as a host, and while the oak is unaffected, American chestnuts nearby will succumb to the blight in approximately a year or more. In addition, the hundreds of chestnut stumps and "living stools" dotting eastern woodlands may still contain active pathogens. It is considered extirpated from Florida and Illinois.

The reduced population of American chestnuts directly impacted many species of insects that relied upon the tree species for survival. Of approximately 60 species that feed upon the American chestnut, seven rely entirely on the American chestnut as a food source. Some of these, like the American chestnut moth, are now extinct or severely reduced in population.

== Attempts at restoration ==
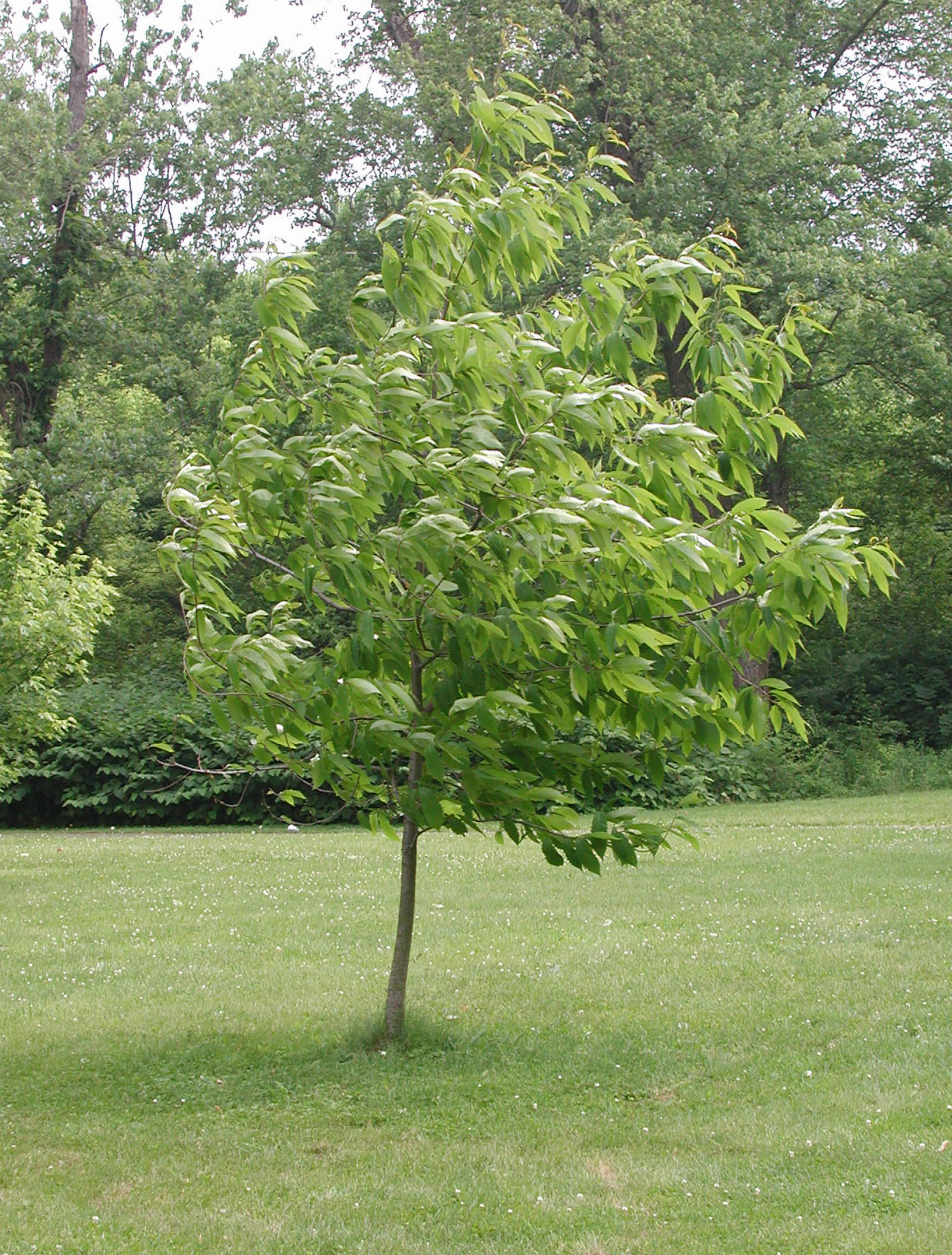
American chestnut field trial sapling from the American Chestnut Cooperators Foundation

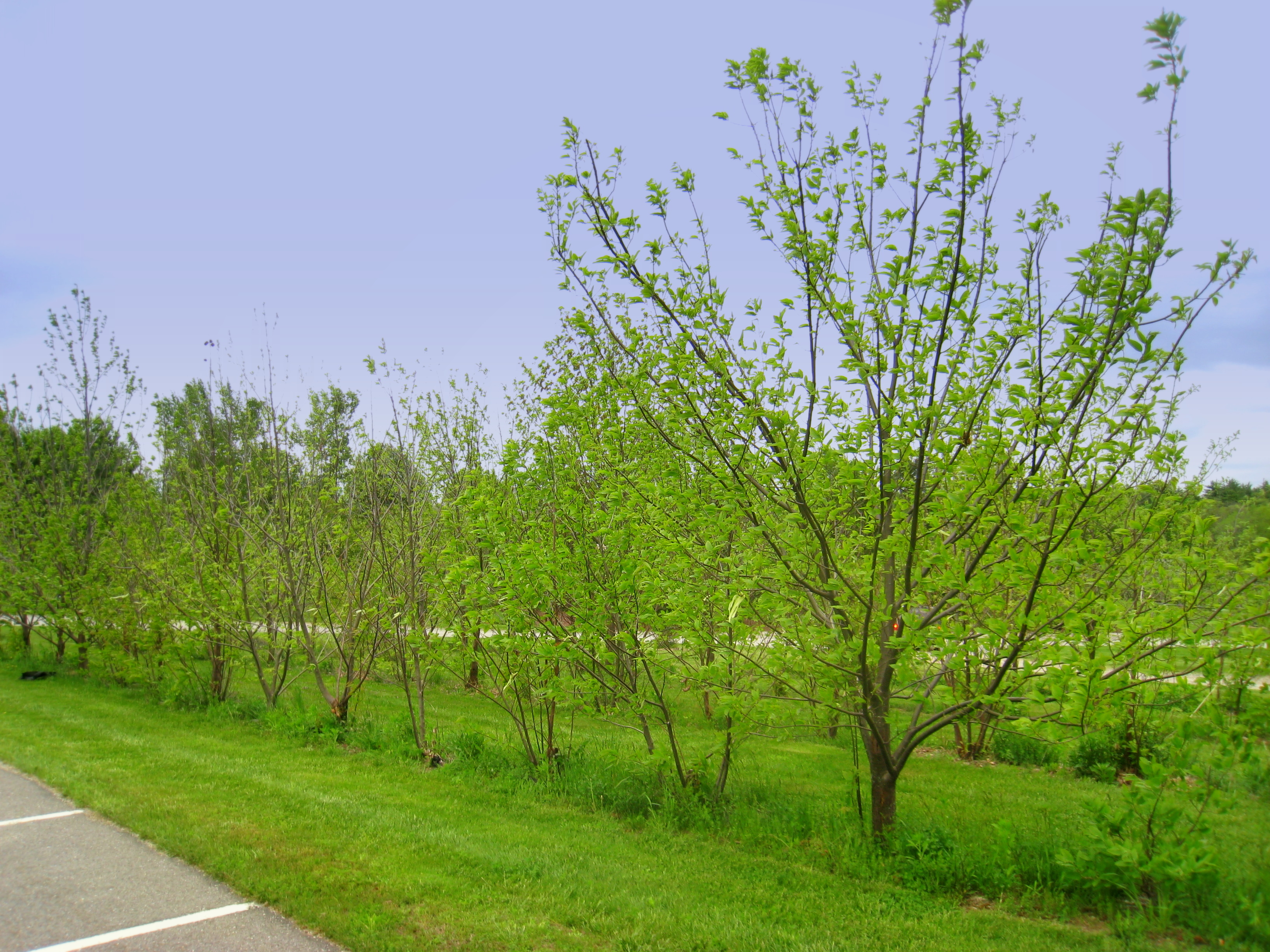
Experimental trials by The American Chestnut Foundation at Tower Hill Botanic Garden in Massachusetts

=== Transgenic blight-resistant American chestnut ===
Researchers at the State University of New York College of Environmental Science and Forestry (ESF) have developed the Darling 58 chestnut cultivar. This cultivar expresses the gene for wheat oxalate oxidase enzyme, which breaks down the oxalic acid produced by the blight fungus, preventing the death of the tree. When pollen of transgenic fathers fertilizes an ovule of a native mother in the field, those resulting seedlings that express the oxalate oxidase enzyme show growth similar to non-transgenic full siblings, indicating that the transgene does not impede growth under field conditions. The modified chestnut does not affect survival, pollen use, or reproduction of bumble bees. A deregulation petition for the Darling 58 variant has been submitted. If approved, these trees could be the first genetically modified forest trees released in the wild in the United States.

Unlike American chestnut, Japanese chestnut exhibits resistance to Phytophthora cinnamomi, the fungal pathogen that causes ink disease. The mechanism of resistance of C. crenata to Phytophthora cinnamomi may derive from its expression of the Cast_Gnk2-like gene (99.6% identical with A0A8J4V9V8). Transgenic modification of C. dentata with the Cast_Gnk2-like gene may provide a mechanism for developing American chestnut trees resistant to Phytophthora cinnamomi. Stacking of the Cast_Gnk2-like gene and the oxalate oxidase gene may provide a means of developing genetically modified American chestnut trees resistant to both the chestnut blight and to ink disease.

The American Chestnut Research and Restoration Project at ESF is not pursuing intellectual property protection through patents. William Powell, the project's co-director, stated that the decision to not pursue a patent on the project's transgenic lines was to allow the plant to be more accessible for conservationists and members of the public. Powell posited that a patent would constrain the spread of the oxalate oxidase transgene into American chestnut populations by limiting the ability to freely plant transgenic trees and cross the trees with surviving American chestnuts or the hybrids produced in the backcross program. Powell stated that patents would be a barrier to chestnut restoration and in direct opposition to the program's goals of collaboration. While patent protection is not sought, the non-profit The American Chestnut Foundation (TACF) maintains control through a Germplasm Agreement, ensuring authorized use of chestnut germplasm. The agreement safeguards TACF's rights and aligns with the organization's restoration goals.

A laboratory error resulted in mistaken use of the Darling 54 cultivar instead of the Darling 58 cultivar in some field trials. TACF and colleagues have also reported decreased growth rates, and poor heritability of resistance of the Darling 58 cultivar. In response, TACF withdrew its support of development of the Darling 58 cultivar in December 2023. The American Chestnut Research & Restoration Program at ESF is continuing to pursue deregulation.

In 2022, the ESF group developed transgenic American chestnut trees incorporating both the oxalate oxidase transgene from wheat and the win3.12 promoter transgene from the necklace poplar. Unlike the CAMV 35S promoter which acts at all times, this poplar promoter drives OxO expression at a low level under basal conditions, but elevates to high levels under conditions of wounding or tissue infection. In laboratory bioassays, win3.12-OxO lines showed elevated disease tolerance similar to that exhibited by blight-resistant Chinese chestnut. Limiting expression of the OxO gene to blight infected tissues is expected to reduce the metabolic cost of gene expression, resulting in increased competitiveness of these new cultivars. As of January 2025, the win3.12 OxO chestnut is still in the research and development phase and has not been deployed for restoration purposes.

New York Restoration Project (NYRP) works with American chestnut conservationist Bart Chezar and TACF to gather, propagate and distribute New York City-grown hybrid American chestnut seedlings. NYRP and the New York City Department of Parks and Recreation planted more than 300 hybrid American chestnut trees in Highbridge Park in 2017. In 2026, workers from the Bronx Zoo and NYRP planted 20 hybrid American chestnut trees along the banks of the Bronx River, in the same place where Merkel first documented the chestnut blight more than 120 years before. A blight-resistant tree in Green-wood Cemetery was the source of some of the trees, which have also been planted in Prospect Park.

=== Intercrossing surviving American chestnuts ===
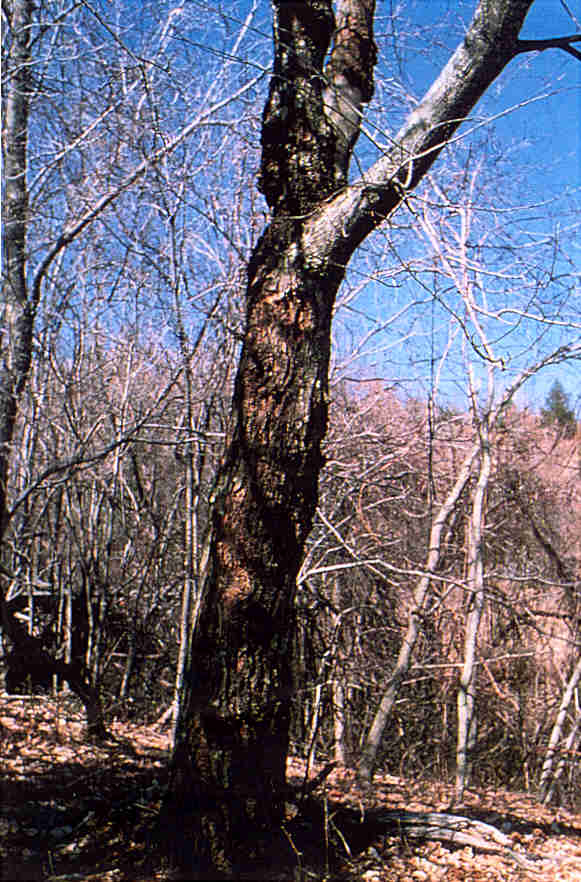
A large surviving blight-resistant American chestnut in its natural range. Surviving trees passing resistance tests are used in ACCF's All American Breeding program.

American Chestnut Cooperators' Foundation (ACCF) is not using crosses with Asian species for blight resistance, but intercrossing among American chestnuts selected for native resistance to the blight, a breeding strategy described by the ACCF as "All-American intercrosses". John Rush Elkins, a research chemist and professor emeritus of chemistry at Concord University, and Gary Griffin, professor of plant pathology at Virginia Tech, think there may be several different characteristics which favor blight resistance. Both Elkins and Griffin have written extensively about the American chestnut. They believe that by making intercrosses among resistant American chestnuts from many locations, they will continue to improve upon the levels of blight resistance to make an American chestnut that can compete in the forest.

Griffin, who has been involved with American chestnut restoration for many years, developed a scale for assessing levels of blight resistance, which made it possible to make selections scientifically. He inoculated five-year-old chestnuts with a standard lethal strain of the blight fungus and measured growth of the cankers. Chestnuts with no resistance to blight make rapid-growing, sunken cankers that are deep and kill tissue right to the wood. Resistant chestnuts make slow-growing, swollen cankers that are superficial: live tissue can be recovered under these cankers. The level of blight resistance is judged by periodic measurement of cankers.

Grafts from large survivors of the blight epidemic were evaluated following inoculations, and controlled crosses among resistant American chestnut trees were made beginning in 1980. The first "All-American intercrosses" were planted in Virginia Tech's Martin American Chestnut Planting in Giles County, Virginia, and in Beckley, West Virginia. They were inoculated in 1990 and evaluated in 1991 and 1992. Nine of the trees showed resistance equal to their parents. Four of these had resistance comparable to hybrids in the same test.

Many ACCF chestnuts have expressed blight resistance equal to or greater than an original blight survivor but so far, only a handful have demonstrated superior, durable blight control. Time will tell if the progeny of these best chestnuts exhibit durable blight resistance in different stress environments.

=== Backcrossing ===
Backcrossing as a treatment for blight was first proposed by Charles Burnham of the University of Minnesota in the 1970s. Burnham, a professor emeritus in agronomy and plant genetics who was considered one of the pioneers of maize genetics, realized that experiments conducted by the USDA to cross-breed American chestnuts with European and Asian chestnuts erroneously assumed that a large number of genes were responsible for blight resistance, while it is currently believed the number of responsible genes is low. The USDA abandoned their cross-breeding program and destroyed local plantings around 1960 after failing to produce a blight-resistant hybrid.

Burnham's recognition of the USDA's error led to him joining with others to create The American Chestnut Foundation in 1983, with the sole purpose of breeding a blight-resistant American chestnut. The American Chestnut Foundation is backcrossing blight-resistant Chinese chestnut into American chestnut trees, to recover the American growth characteristics and genetic makeup, and then finally intercrossing the advanced backcross generations to eliminate genes for susceptibility to blight.

The first backcrossed American chestnut tree, called "Clapper", survived blight for 25 years, and grafts of the tree have been used by The American Chestnut Foundation since 1983. The Pennsylvania chapter of The American Chestnut Foundation, which seeks to restore the American chestnut to the forests of the Mid-Atlantic states, has planted over 22,000 trees.

The Surface Mining Control and Reclamation Act of 1977 requires owners of abandoned coal mines to cover at least 80 percent of their land with vegetation. While many companies planted invasive grasses, others began funding research on planting trees, because they can be more cost-effective, and yield better results. Keith Gilland began planting American chestnut trees in old strip mines in 2008 as a student at Miami University, and to date has planted over 5,000 trees. In 2005, a hybrid tree with mostly American genes was planted on the lawn of the White House.

A tree planted in 2005 in the tree library outside the USDA building was still very healthy seven years later. It contains 98% American chestnut DNA and 2% Chinese chestnut DNA. This tree contains enough Chinese chestnut DNA that encodes for systemic resistance genes to resist the blight. This is essential for restoring the American chestnut trees into the Northeast. The Northern Nut Growers Association (NNGA) has also been active in pursuing viable hybrids.

From 1962 to 1990, Alfred Szego and other members of the NNGA developed hybrids with Chinese varieties which showed limited resistance. Initially the backcrossing method would breed a hybrid from an American chestnut nut and a Chinese chestnut, the hybrid would then be bred with a normal American chestnut, subsequent breeding would involve a hybrid and an American chestnut or two hybrids, which would increase the genetic makeup of the hybrids primarily American chestnut but still retain the blight resistance of the Chinese chestnut.

A backcross breeding program has integrated desirable American chestnut traits with traits from the Chinese chestnut, achieving intermediate resistance to Cryphonectria parasitica and Phytophthora cinnamomi in the hybrid genome.

The B3F3 strain, a product of backcrossing and intercrossing with selection for blight resistance, is approximately 94% American chestnut and 6% Chinese chestnut and has been planted experimentally in Maryland in an orchard.

=== Hypovirulence ===
Hypovirus is the only genus in the family Hypoviridae. Members of this genus infect fungal pathogens and reduce their ability to cause disease (hypovirulence). In particular, the virus infects Cryphonectria parasitica, the fungus that causes chestnut blight, which has enabled infected trees to recover from the blight. The use of hypovirulence to control blight originated in Europe where the fungal virus spread naturally through populations of European chestnuts. The reduced ability of the fungus to cause disease allowed the European chestnut to regenerate, creating large stands of trees. Hypovirulence has also been found in North America, but has not spread effectively.

The "Arner Tree" of Southern Ontario is one of the best examples of naturally occurring hypovirulence. It is a mature American chestnut that has recovered from severe infections of chestnut blight. The cankers have healed over and the tree continues to grow vigorously. Scientists have discovered that the chestnut blight remaining on the tree is hypovirulent, although isolates taken from the tree do not have the fungal viruses found in other isolates.

Trees inoculated with isolates taken from the Arner tree have shown moderate canker control. The cankers of hypovirulent American chestnut trees occur on the outermost tissues of the tree but the cankers do not spread into the growth tissues of the American chestnut tree, thereby providing it with a resistance.

== Surviving specimens ==
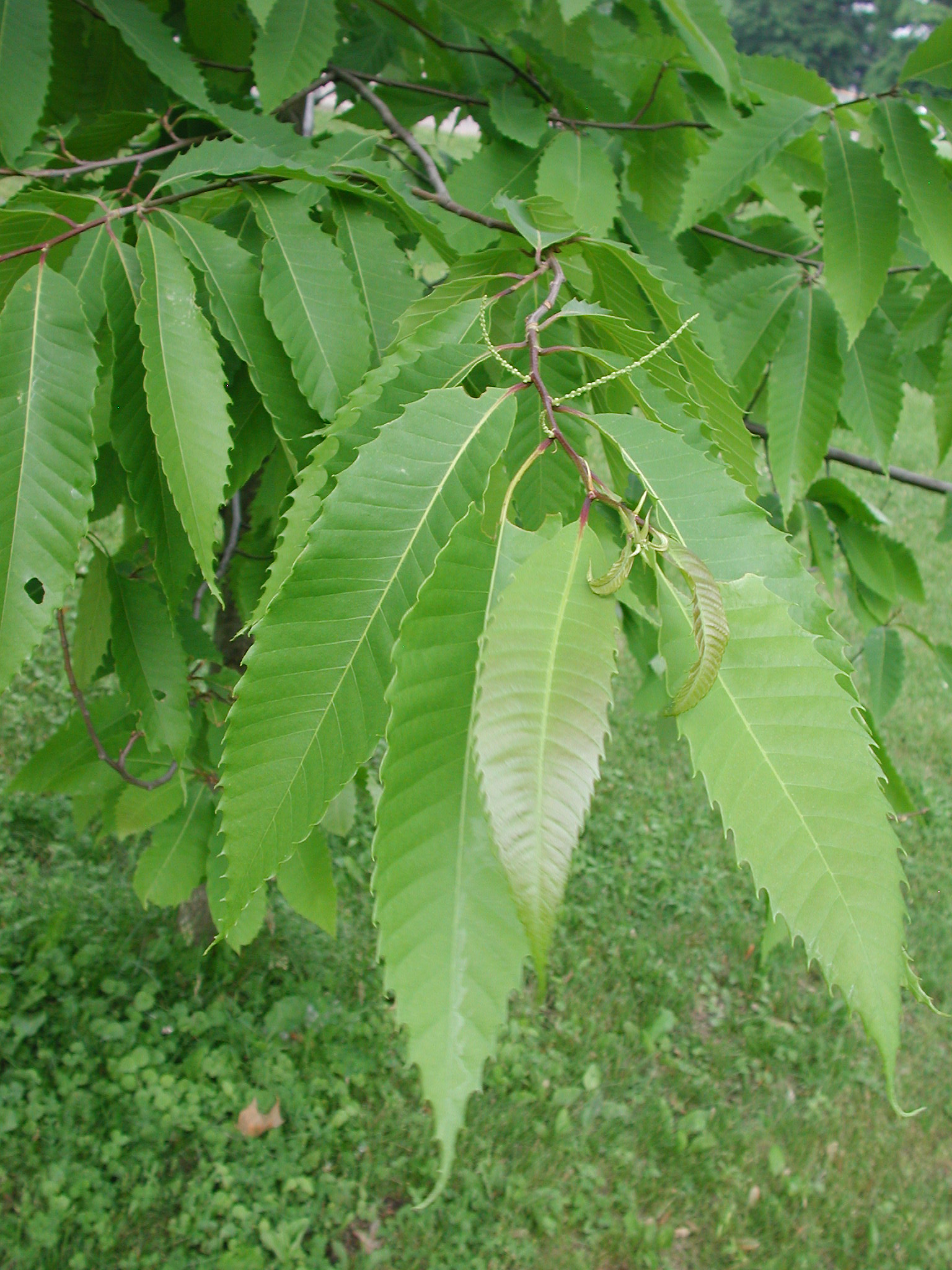
American chestnut leaves, late spring

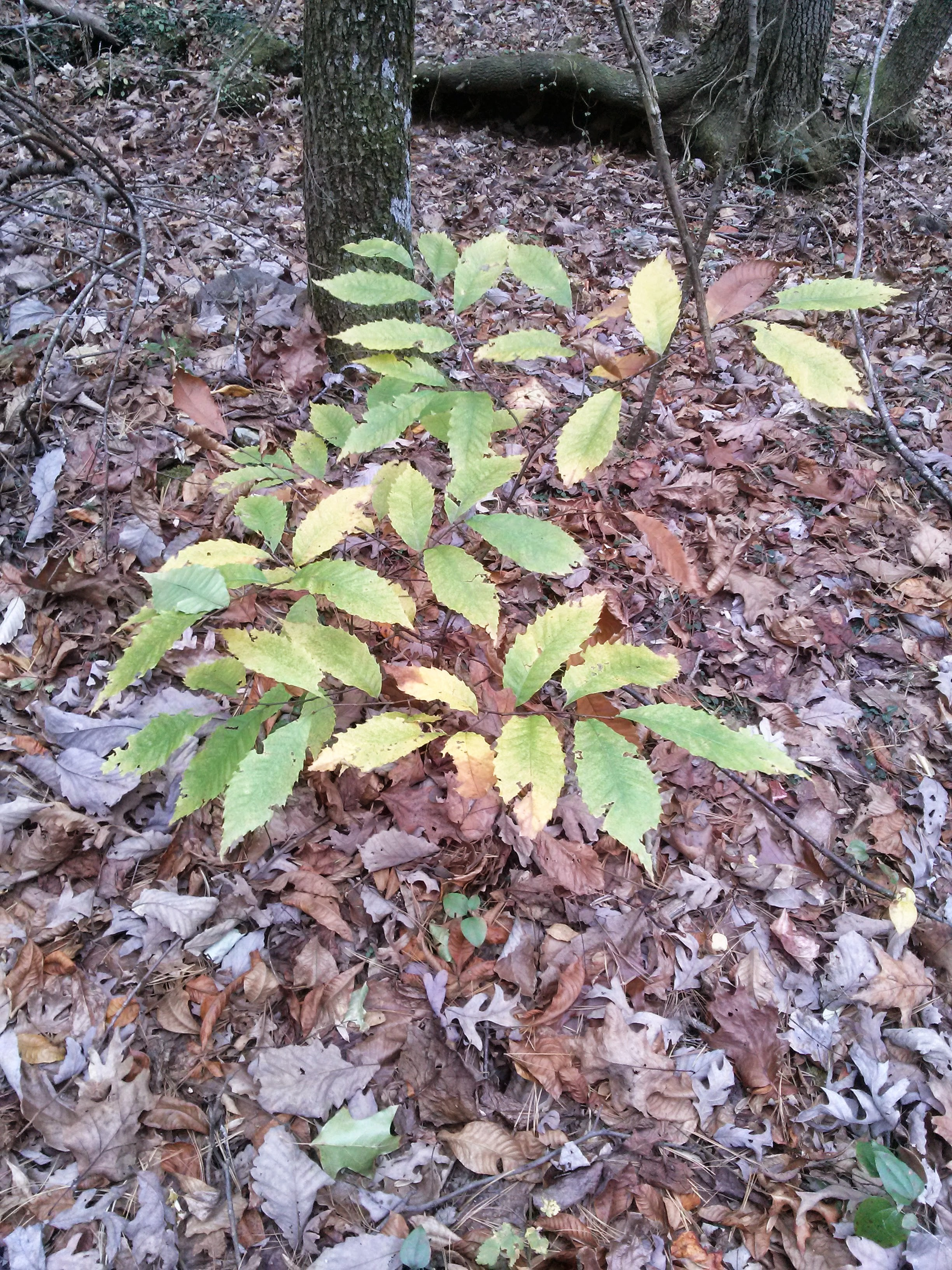
Shoot with fall foliage taken in November in North Georgia

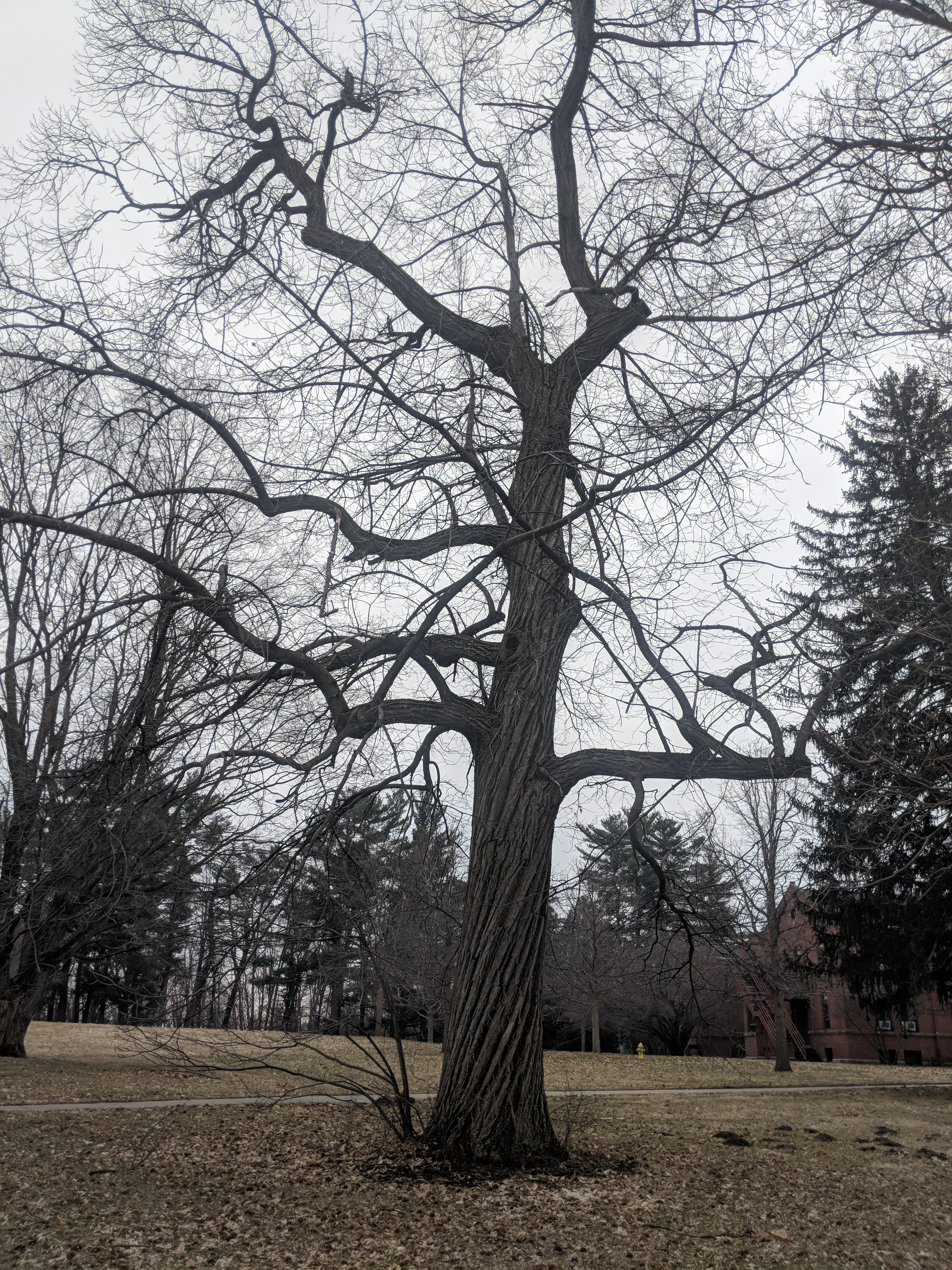
A lone American chestnut in late winter in Iowa

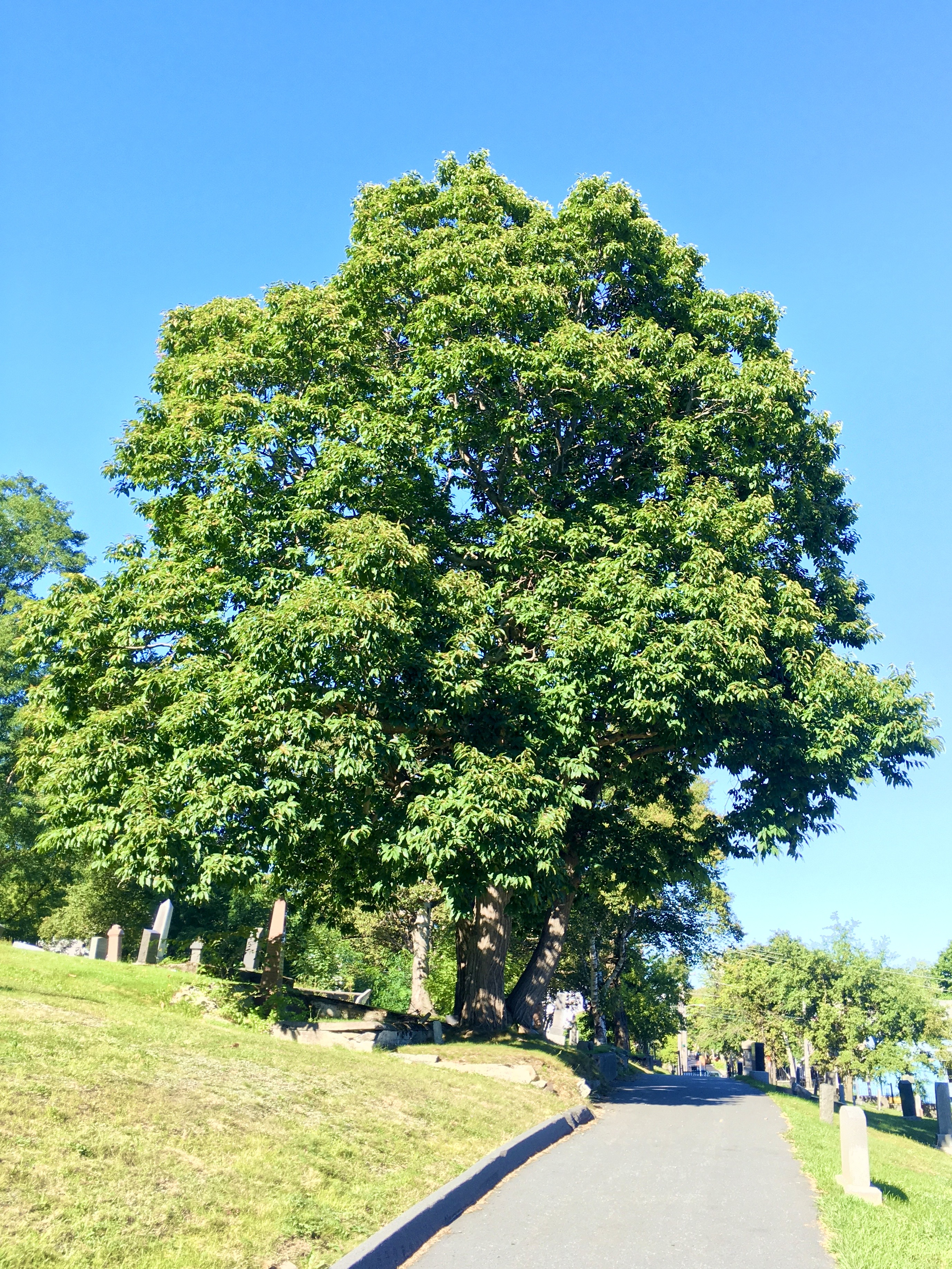
A mature, healthy American chestnut in Halifax, Nova Scotia

- About 2,500 chestnut trees are growing on 60 acres (24 ha) near West Salem, Wisconsin, which is the world's largest remaining stand of American chestnut. These trees are the descendants of those planted by Martin Hicks, an early settler in the area, who planted fewer than a dozen trees in the late 19th century. Planted outside the natural range of chestnut, these trees escaped the initial onslaught of chestnut blight, but in 1987 scientists found blight in the stand. Scientists are working to try to save the trees.
- Some 1,348 chestnut trees, varying in size from seedlings to nearly mature trees, are growing in a forest in western Maine. These chestnuts were originally established in 1982 from four seed-bearing trees sourced from wild stock of a northern Michigan relict population. This grove of trees has dispersed over an area up to 370 meters from the parent trees. The trees appear to be free of chestnut blight.
- In 2008, officials of the Ohio Department of Natural Resources announced a rare adult American chestnut tree had been discovered in a marsh near Lake Erie. The officials admitted they had known about the tree for seven years but had kept its existence a secret. The exact location of the tree is still being held secret, both because of the risk of infecting the tree and because an eagle had nested in its branches. They described the tree as being 89 feet (27 m) tall and having a circumference of 5 feet (1.5 m). The American Chestnut Foundation was also only recently told about the tree's existence.
- Members of the Kentucky chapter of the American Chestnut Foundation have been pollinating a tree found on a farm in Adair County, and a specimen found on Henderson Ridge in Elliott County. The Adair County tree is over one hundred years old.
- In 2007 a mature American chestnut was discovered in Farmington, New Hampshire.
- In rural Missaukee County, Michigan, a blight-free grove of American chestnut trees approximately 0.33 acres (0.13 ha) in size with the largest tree measuring 128 in (330 cm) in circumference (40 in (100 cm) diameter) has been located. It is believed to be the result of nuts planted by early settlers in the area. The American Chestnut Council has verified its identity and existence. Efforts have been initiated to protect the property from logging and development. In Lansing, Michigan, Fenner Nature Center was home to a grove of blight-free American chestnuts descended from the grove in Missaukee County. The grove has ultimately succumbed to the blight but continues to stump sprout.
- American chestnuts have been located on Beaver Island in Lake Michigan.
- Hundreds of healthy American chestnuts have been found in the proposed Chestnut Ridge Wilderness Area in the Allegheny National Forest in northwestern Pennsylvania. Many of these trees measure more than 60 ft (18 m) in height. These trees will be protected from logging if the wilderness area, proposed by Friends of Allegheny Wilderness, is passed into law.
- The Montreal Botanical Garden has the American chestnut among its collection of trees and ornamental shrubs.
- At least two American chestnuts live on the side of Skitchewaug Trail in Springfield, Vermont.
- Around 300 to 500 trees were spotted in the George Washington National Forest near Augusta County, Virginia, in 2014. Over one dozen trees were at least 12 inches in diameter with several measuring nearly 24 inches in diameter. Only one of the larger trees was a seed and pollen producer with numerous pods and pollen strands lying on ground. The site did, however, have a high presence of chestnut blight, although the seed producing tree and several other large ones were relatively blight-free with minimal to no damage.
- Two trees were planted 1985, in Nova Scotia, at Dalhousie University, Sexton Campus and are thriving. The donated trees were from saplings grown in Europe, away from the blight. They have 16-inch (41 cm) diameter trunks and are approximately 40 feet (12 m) high.
- Multiple nut-bearing trees are in Wind River Arboretum, Washington.

== Uses ==
=== Food ===
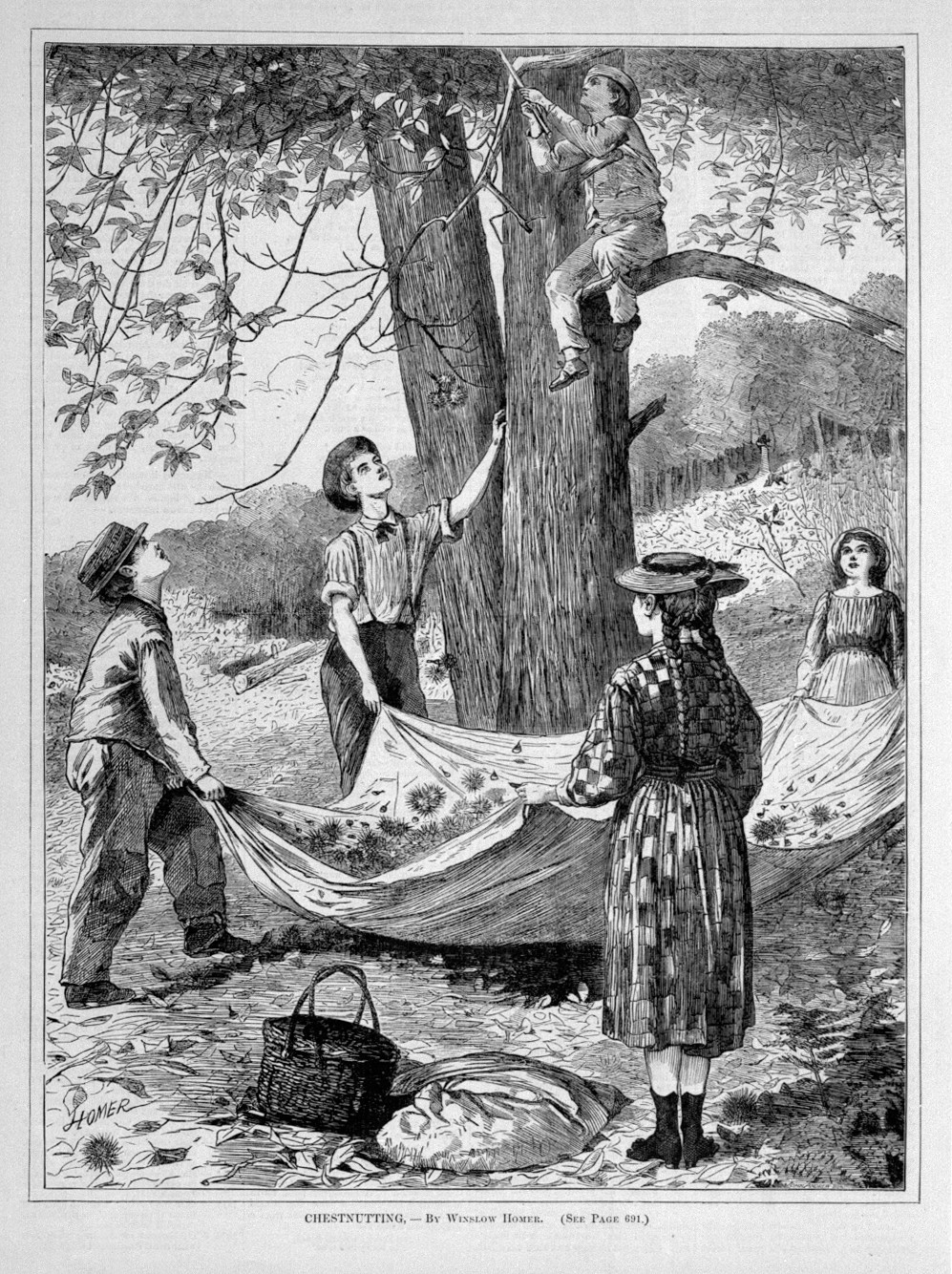
Chestnutting, Winslow Homer 1870

The nuts were once an important economic resource in North America, being sold on the streets of towns and cities, as they sometimes still are during the Christmas season (usually said to be "roasting on an open fire" because their smell is readily identifiable many blocks away). Chestnuts are edible raw or roasted, though typically preferred roasted. One must peel the brown skin to access the yellowish-white edible portion.

The nuts were commonly fed on by various types of wildlife and was also in such a high abundance that they were used to feed livestock by farmers, by allowing those livestock to roam freely into the forests that were predominantly filled with American chestnut trees. The tree was important to many Native American tribes in North America as it served as a food source, both for them and the wildlife they hunted, and also as a component in traditional medicine.

=== Furniture and other wood products ===
The January 1888 issue of Orchard and Garden mentions the American chestnut as being "superior in quality to any found in Europe". The wood is straight-grained, strong, and easy to saw and split, and it lacks the radial end grain found on most other hardwoods. The tree was particularly valuable commercially since it grew at a faster rate than oaks. Being rich in tannins, the wood was highly resistant to decay and therefore used for a variety of purposes, including furniture, split-rail fences, shingles, home construction, flooring, piers, plywood, paper pulp, and telephone poles. Tannins were also extracted from the bark for tanning leather. Although larger trees are no longer available for milling, much chestnut wood has been reclaimed from historic barns to be refashioned into furniture and other items.

"Wormy" chestnut refers to a defective grade of wood that has insect damage, having been sawn from long-dead, blight-killed trees. This "wormy" wood has since become fashionable for its rustic character.

== In popular culture ==
- In Washington Irving's 1819 short story, "The Legend of Sleepy Hollow," protagonist Ichabod Crane encounters the headless horseman along a road where "a group of oaks and chestnuts, matted thick with wild grape vines, threw a cavernous gloom over it." It was in this same grove, Irving reports, where the British spy, Major John André, was captured by Revolutionary forces.
- Nathaniel Hawthorne uses a chestnut "nutting" expedition as a narrative device in his collection of Greek myths, A Wonder-Book for Girls and Boys (1851). The protagonist, Cousin Eustace, describes the oaks that grow through the giant Atlas' toes as being "bigger than the great chestnut-tree which stands beyond Captain Smith's house." One of the young children, while listening to the tales, "had been sitting on a chestnut-burr, and was stuck as full as a pincushion of its prickles." The narrator encourages the children to gather more nuts: "Fill all your baskets ; and, at Christmas time, I will crack them for you, and tell you beautiful stories." One of the children comments that she would like the stories better "when there is nothing to do, than while there were nuts to be gathered, and beautiful weather to enjoy."

== See also ==
- South-Central Interior Mesophytic Forest
- Allegheny-Cumberland dry oak forest and woodland
- Appalachian hemlock-northern hardwood forest
- Central and southern Appalachian montane oak forest
- Northeastern interior dry–mesic oak forest
- The American Chestnut Foundation
