= The American Chestnut Foundation =

Group promoting chestnut restoration in Eastern U.S. forests

- Abbreviation: TACF
- Named after: American Chestnut tree
- Board of Directors Chair: Elizabeth Kramer
- President & CEO: Michael Goergen
- Main organ: Chestnut magazine (2015-present); The Journal of the American Chestnut Foundation (1985-2015)
- Website: www.tacf.org

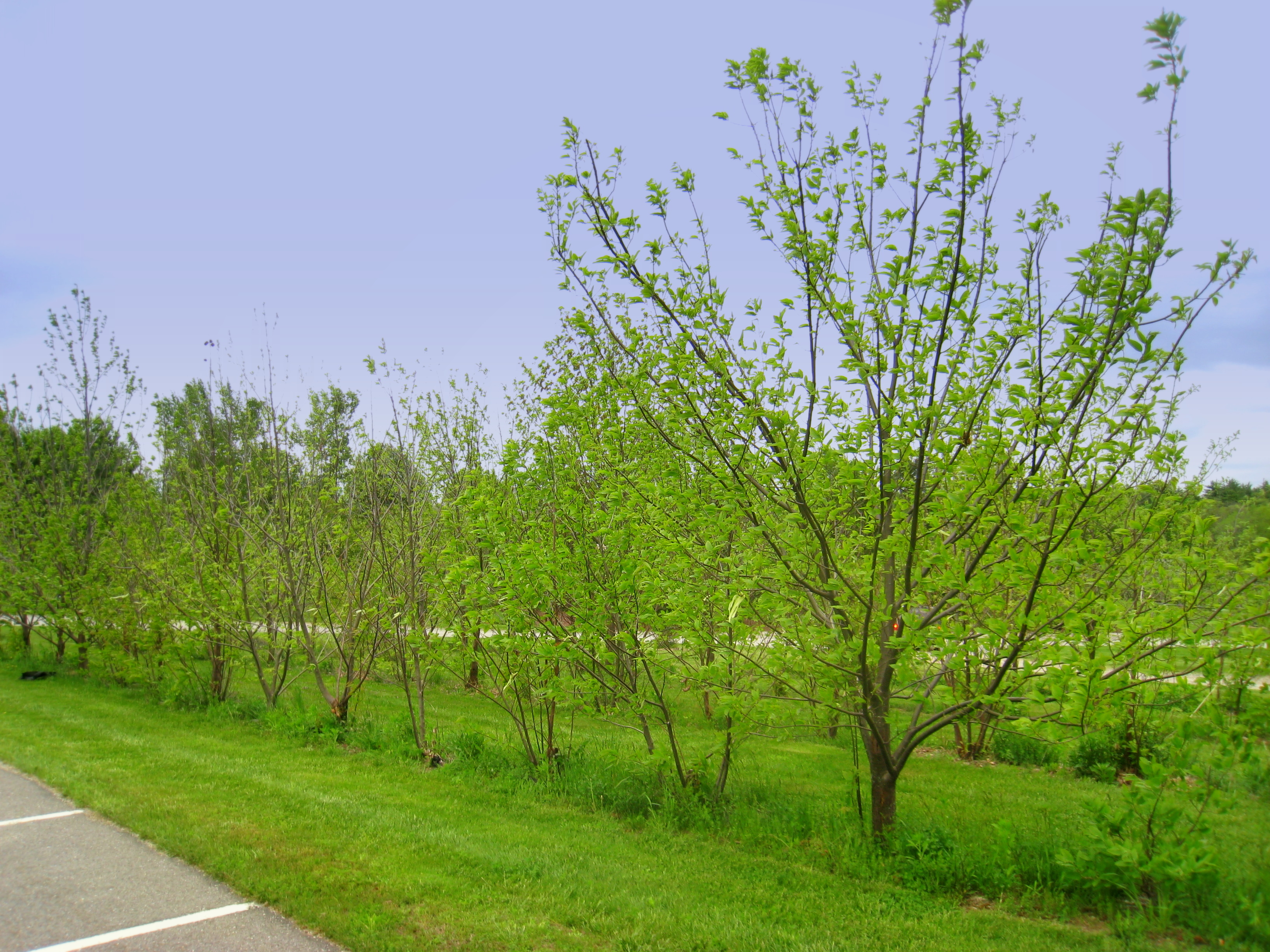
Experimental trials at Tower Hill Botanic Garden in Massachusetts

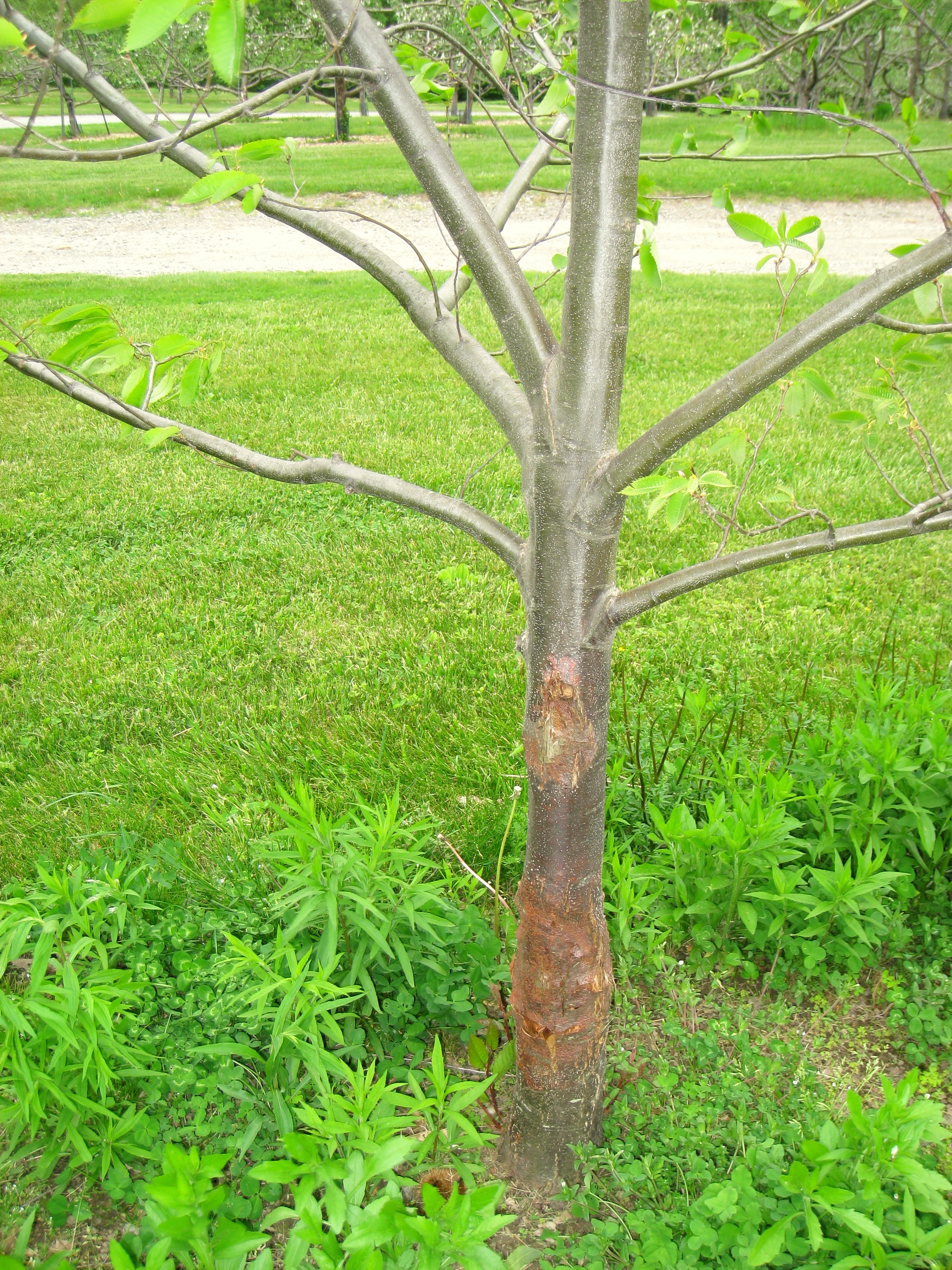
Chestnut blight affecting a young American chestnut

The American Chestnut Foundation (TACF) is a nonprofit American organization dedicated to breeding a blight-resistant American chestnut (Castanea dentata) tree and to the reintroduction of this tree to the forests of the Eastern United States.

== Mission ==
The mission of The American Chestnut Foundation (TACF) is to restore the American chestnut tree to the forests of Eastern North America by breeding genetically diverse blight-resistant trees, evaluating various approaches to the management of chestnut pests and pathogens, and reintroducing the trees into the forest in an ecologically acceptable manner. The American chestnut tree once comprised a quarter of the eastern hardwood forest from Maine to Georgia and west to the Ohio River Valley, providing a valuable economic resource in both timber and nuts, as well as an abundant food source for wildlife. Roughly 3.5 billion American chestnut trees in the Appalachian hardwood forest were destroyed by a fungus identified as Cryphonectria parasitica between 1904 and 1940.

TACF's work is accomplished by the combination of a small professional staff and a large group of volunteers associated with sixteen state chapters from Maine to Georgia/Alabama and west to the Ohio River Valley. Chapters leverage TACF's efforts by organizing volunteers to identify surviving American chestnuts, pollinate these survivors with pollen from TACF's Meadowview Research Farms station in Virginia, and establish and maintain local breeding nurseries. These nurseries expect to eventually produce blight-resistant trees adapted to local conditions throughout the original range. The requirements for both genetic diversity and regional adaptability were the key factors in the establishment of the state chapter breeding programs staffed by volunteers.

The American Chestnut Foundation differs from the American Chestnut Cooperators Foundation, which is attempting to re-establish the species using pure American chestnut genetic stock.

== History ==
TACF was founded in 1983 by a group of prominent plant scientists, including Nobel Prize-winning plant breeder Norman Borlaug; Peter Raven, Director of the Missouri Botanical Garden; independent chestnut researcher Philip Rutter; and the late Charles Burnham, a Minnesota corn geneticist. In 1989 TACF established the Wagner Research Farm, a breeding station in Meadowview, in southwestern Virginia, to execute the backcross breeding program. A second research farm in Meadowview was donated to TACF in 1995, and a third Meadowview farm was purchased in 2002. As of late 2005, TACF's Meadowview Research Farms have over 57,000 trees at various stages of breeding, planted on more than 150 acres (610,000 m^{2}) of land.

TACF has established partnerships with many different organizations involved in efforts to study and restore the American Chestnut. These include university partnerships, the National Wild Turkey Federation, and the US Forest Service.

In 2007, TACF began harvesting nuts that it expects will be suitable for planting back into the forest. However, these breeding lines are still in the testing phase, and their value needs to be proven on many forest sites until 2015 to 2020. One group of highly backcrossed blight-resistant chestnuts produced by the organization is 15/16 (ca. 94%) American chestnut (Castanea dentata) and 1/16 (ca. 6%) Chinese chestnut (Castanea mollissima), a source of blight resistance.

In 2020, the Darling 58, a transgenic American chestnut tree, became the first genetically engineered organism developed for ecological restoration. This line of chestnut-blight-resistant trees was developed by the American Chestnut Research and Restoration Project at the State University of New York, College of Environmental Science and Forestry (SUNY-ESF). A gene from wheat plants is what allows it to tolerate the blight. Pending federal regulatory approval, Darling 58 was to be integrated into TACF’s restoration program and made available for widespread public planting and sharing. However, a laboratory error resulted in mistaken use of the Darling 54 cultivar instead of the Darling 58 cultivar in some field trials. TACF and colleagues have also reported decreased growth rates, and poor heritability of resistance of the Darling 58 cultivar. In response, the American Chestnut Foundation withdrew its support of development of the Darling 58 cultivar in December 2023. The American Chestnut Research & Restoration Program at SUNY ESF is continuing to pursue deregulation.

The intention is to have an unrestricted and open release so that the Darling 58 trees and their pollen will restore the American chestnut across its historical range. This integration of genetic technologies into chestnut restoration was spurred by the Forest Health Initiative (FHI), which enrolled experts including the SUNY-ESF and researchers affiliated with TACF to aid in their projects focused on the American chestnut.

Trees may be sold to offset production costs but the genetic material will not be patented because it would impede chestnut restoration. This was made possible by the variety of funding sources for the project, particularly the TACF and especially their New York Chapter. However, TACF used a Germplasm Agreement to maintain IP protection on germplasm generated through their breeding program. This prohibited the propagation of materials from early backcross generations and the sale or transfer of American chestnut germplasm received from them without their approval and protected research generated by its plant material. However, it does not seem to limit the publication of research findings related to the molecular characterization or ecological performance of the backcross trees. TACF views that maintaining this IP protection is necessary for successful restoration.
