= Hebron (CDP), Wisconsin =

Census-designated place in Wisconsin, United States

Hebron, Wisconsin
- Census-designated place
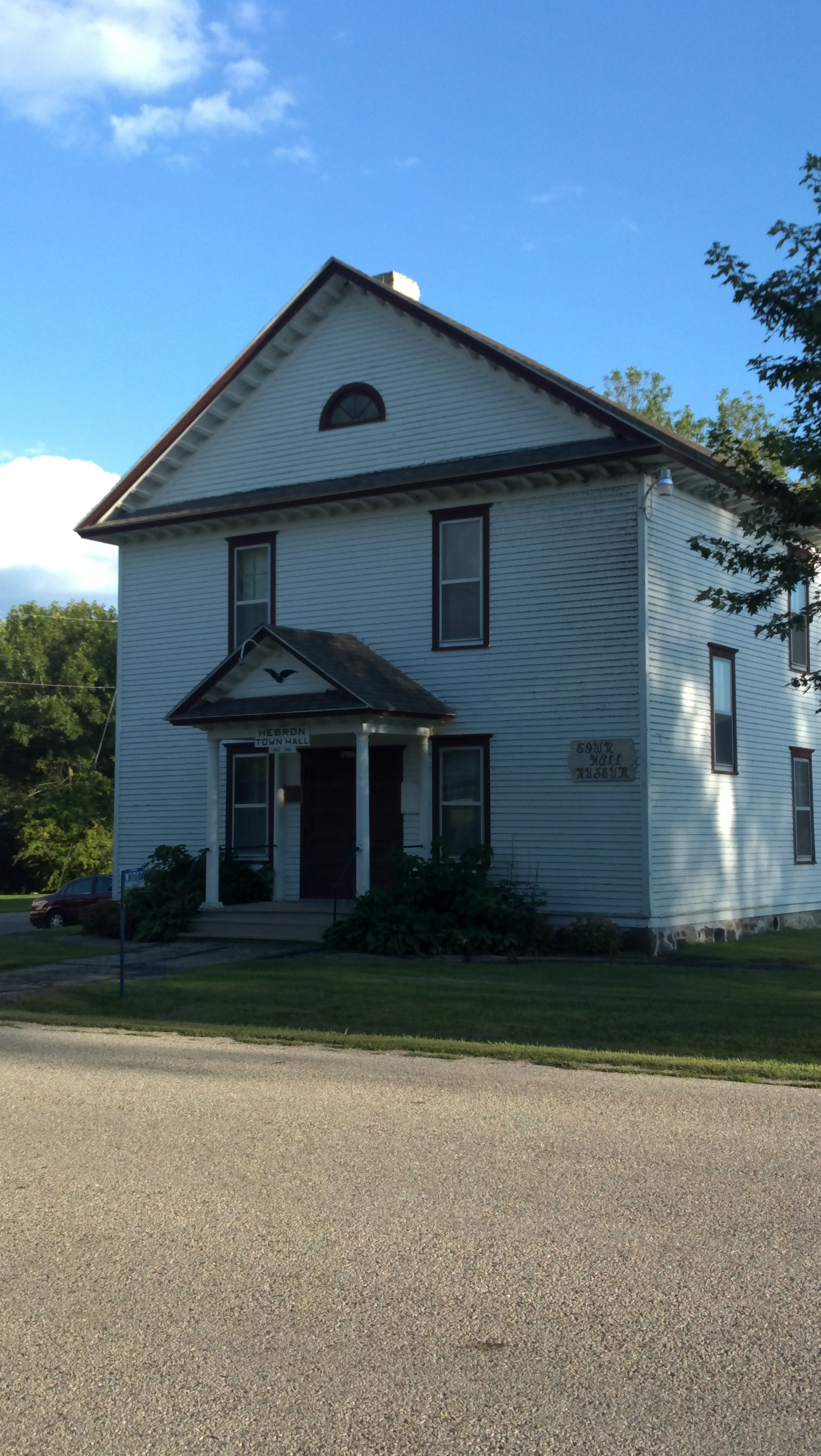
- Hebron Town Hall

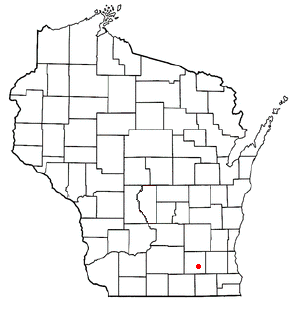
- Location of Hebron, Wisconsin
- Coordinates: 42°55′34″N 88°41′16″W
- Country: United States
- State: Wisconsin
- County: Jefferson
- Town: Hebron

Area
  - Total: 2.5 sq mi (6.5 km^{2})
  - Land: 2.5 sq mi (6.4 km^{2})
  - Water: 0.039 sq mi (0.1 km^{2})
- Elevation: 827 ft (252 m)

Population (2020)
  - Total: 209
  - Density: 85/sq mi (33/km^{2})
- Time zone: UTC-6 (Central (CST))
  - Summer (DST): UTC-5 (CDT)
- GNIS feature ID: 2393044

Hebron is a census-designated place (CDP) in the town of Hebron, Jefferson County, Wisconsin, United States. The population was 209 at the 2020 census. It is located on the Bark River.

== Geography ==
Hebron is located at 42°55′34″N 88°41′16″W (42.926205, -88.688025).

According to the United States Census Bureau, the CDP has a total area of 2.5 square miles (6.5 km^{2}), of which 2.5 square miles (6.4 km^{2}) is land and 0.04 square mile (0.1 km^{2}) (1.60%) is water.

== Demographics ==
Historical population
Census	Pop.	Note	%±
2000	243		—
2010	224		−7.8%
2020	209		−6.7%
U.S. Decennial Census

As of the census of 2000, there were 243 people, 87 households, and 64 families residing in the CDP. The population density was 98.9 people per square mile (38.1/km^{2}). There were 93 housing units at an average density of 37.8/sq mi (14.6/km^{2}). The racial makeup of the CDP was 97.53% White, 0.41% Black or African American and 2.06% Native American. Hispanic or Latino of any race were 2.06% of the population.

There were 87 households, out of which 37.9% had children under the age of 18 living with them, 65.5% were married couples living together, 2.3% had a female householder with no husband present, and 26.4% were non-families. 21.8% of all households were made up of individuals, and 11.5% had someone living alone who was 65 years of age or older. The average household size was 2.79 and the average family size was 3.23.

In the CDP, the population was spread out, with 30.0% under the age of 18, 7.4% from 18 to 24, 30.0% from 25 to 44, 20.2% from 45 to 64, and 12.3% who were 65 years of age or older. The median age was 35 years. For every 100 females, there were 109.5 males. For every 100 females age 18 and over, there were 97.7 males.

The median income for a household in the CDP was $56,250, and the median income for a family was $54,821. Males had a median income of $31,667 versus $22,292 for females. The per capita income for the CDP was $19,484. None of the population or families were below the poverty line.
