= Darling 58 =

Engineered American Chestnut tree

The Darling 58 is a genetically engineered American chestnut tree. The tree was created by American Chestnut Research & Restoration Program (ACRRP) at the State University of New York College of Environmental Science and Forestry (SUNY ESF) in collaboration with The American Chestnut Foundation (TACF) to restore the American chestnut to the forests of North America. These Darling-58 trees are attacked by chestnut blight, but survive. Darling-58 trees survive to reach maturity, produce chestnuts, and multiply to restore the American chestnut tree to the forests of North America. An error early in the breeding program resulted in use of an alternate cultivar, Darling 54 in some (if not all) field tests of the Darling 58 prior to the error's discovery in October 2023.

While The American Chestnut Foundation discontinued support of development of the Darling 58 cultivar in December 2023, in part due to the mistaken use of Darling 54 in all completed field trials, The American Chestnut Research & Restoration Program, who originated the tree, continues its development. The ACRRP has decided to build on top of the existing Darling 54 field trials and seek adoption of the Darling 54 tree instead. An updated petition containing a corrected list of field trials is expected in Summer 2025.

== Background ==
The chestnut blight was introduced in the late 19th century with the Japanese chestnut and decimated the once-widespread American chestnut tree. Native un-modified trees are killed from the ground up by the blight, and only the root system survives. The roots then continue to send up shoots that are once again attacked by the blight and die back before they reach maturity, repeating the cycle.

== Mechanism ==
Chestnut blight damages trees by producing oxalic acid, which lowers the pH in the cambium and kills plant tissues. Darling 58 adds an oxalate oxidase (OxO) gene from wheat, driven by a CaMV 35S promoter. The promoter allows the OxO protein to be made all through the plant. The OxO protein allows the plant to break down the acid before too much damage is done. The same defense strategy is found not only in wheat, but also in strawberries, bananas, oats, barley, and other cereals. The resistant trait is passed down to progeny. The resistance does not stop the blight from completing its lifecycle.

Extensive testing done with the transgenic Darling 58 variant to assess its effects on other species showed that the survival, pollen use, and reproduction of bumble bees were not affected by oxalate oxidase at the typical concentrations found in the pollen of the American chestnut. Presence of the transgenic oxalate oxidase gene in the genome of the American chestnut has little effect on photosynthetic or respiratory physiology.

== History ==
In 2013, reported initial experiments to introduce wheat OxO into American chestnuts. Potted transgenic plants with two different promoters (35S, VspB) were created. OxO levels are measured out of the plant leaves. Infection experiments on cut leaves show that the lesion sizes can be reduced to around or below the level of the blight-resistant Chinese chestnut, suggesting that the potted plant may be resistant too.

In 2014, SUNY ESF reported that the "Darling4" transgenic event produced an intermediate level of resistance between American and Chinese chestnuts. The trait was also passed into progeny.

The Darling 58 (SX58) line was produced before 2016. A 2020 SUNY-ESF Masters thesis shows that Darling 58 is the transgenic event that produces the highest amount of OxO.

In January 2020, the researchers submitted a deregulation petition for the Darling 58 variant, with a public comment period ending October 19, 2020.

In November 2022, the USDA began another public comment period for Darling 58's approval.

In 2022, SUNY-ESF scientists reported that a different promoter, win3.12 from the eastern cottonwood, allows the expression levels of OxO to remain low in basal conditions, but increase under wound or infection. This modification is expected to be more metabolically efficient compared to the "always-on" CAMV promoter and thereby have greater transgene stability over successive generations compared with the Darling 58 variant. In laboratory bioassays, win3.12-OxO lines showed elevated disease tolerance similar to that exhibited by blight-resistant Chinese chestnut.

In December 2023, TACF announced that they were discontinuing development of the Darling 58 due to poor performance results. This is likely due to a mishap that causes a similar strain called Darling 54 to be actually used in tests; a disruption of an existing gene Sal1 in Darling 54 could have caused poor performance (see section below). The ESF has decided to build on top of the existing Darling 54 field trials and seek adoption of the Darling 54 tree instead. The SUNY ESF is continuing to seek federal approval to distribute seeds to the public without the support of TACF.

=== Darling 54 ===
In December 2023, it was announced that there had been a mishap and any material known as "Darling 58" was actually "Darling 54". Darling 54 is a transgenic American chestnut tree also modified with the 35S:OxO construct. The difference between D58 and D54 is that D54 has the 35S:OxO construct inserted into a coding sequence within its genome. D58 was thought to have the 35S:OxO construct inserted into a non-coding region of the genome. An insertion in a coding sequence, or gene, could disrupt or alter gene expression and therefore protein function. The 35S:OxO construct is located within the Sal1 gene of the D54 genome. Sal1 is linked to drought stress and oxidative stress responses in other species.
