= Charles Burnham (geneticist) =

American plant geneticist (1904–1995)

Charles Russell Burnham
- Born: January 13, 1904; Hebron, Wisconsin
- Died: April 19, 1995 (aged 91); Saint Paul, Minnesota
- Citizenship: United States
- Education: University of Wisconsin
- Scientific career
- Fields: Genetics, Plant Biology
- Workplaces: University of West Virginia, University of Minnesota
- Doctoral advisor: RA Brink
- Notable students: Ronald L. Phillips

Charles Russell Burnham (1904–1995) was an American plant geneticist who studied maize cytology and genetics. In 1968 he was elected a fellow of the American Society of Agronomy. After his retirement he played a critical role in developing a blight resistant strain of the American chestnut.

== Early life and education ==
Burnham was born in Hebron, Wisconsin in 1904 and grew up in Fort Atkinson, Wisconsin. He attended college first at the University of Minnesota for two years, then transferring to the University of Wisconsin where he earned his BA in 1924, and MS in 1925. He became a graduate assistant of RA Brink studying maize genetics and earned a PhD in genetics with a minor in Plant Pathology in 1929. At this point, he received a National Research Fellowship to travel to Cornell University where he studied under Rollins A. Emerson and alongside Marcus Rhoades and future Nobel Prize winners Barbara McClintock and George Beadle. After Cornell, Burnham went on to work at Harvard with Edward Murray East and then to the California Institute of Technology. He worked with Lewis Stadler at the University of Missouri in 1932–33. In 1934 he was hired as an assistant professor of genetics at the University of West Virginia where he worked on breeding corn and watermelons in addition to continuing his work on maize cytogenetics that he started during his time with Emerson. In 1937 Burham was hired as an associate professor at the University of Minnesota, where he worked until his retirement in 1972.

== Research ==
Burnham's research at the University of Minnesota touched on a number of species including maize, barley and flax. He published papers on pollen tube growth, disease resistance, genetic sterility, chromosomal rearrangements, polyploidy, and statistical genetic methods. In 1966 he published "Discussions in Cytogenetics" which was on its 6th printing by 1980.

== After retirement ==
After Burnham's retirement he continued to maintain a maize genetics nursery and developed an interest in chestnut genetics, co-founding The American Chestnut Foundation in 1983. Burnham died in 1995.

A letter Burnham wrote in 1983 shows his ongoing conversation with Barbara McClintock.
