= American Chestnut Cooperators' Foundation =

US nonprofit dedicated to restoring the American chestnut

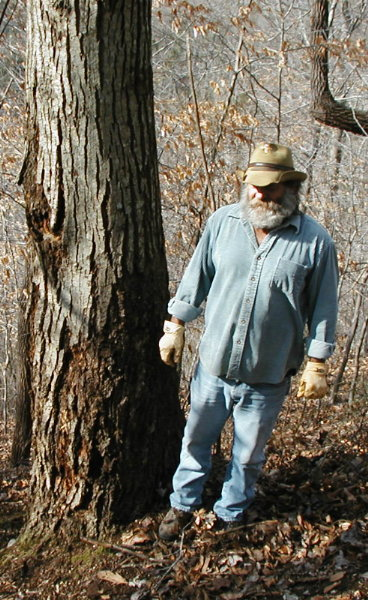
Large surviving American chestnut in its natural range

The American Chestnut Cooperators' Foundation (ACCF) is a 501(c)(3) non-profit, scientific, and educational foundation that was organized in 1986 and, with the help of research and volunteers from Virginia Tech University, is dedicated to restoring the American chestnut (Castanea dentata) to its former place in the United States Eastern hardwood forests.

== Mission ==
One of the organization's priorities includes the development of blight-resistant chestnuts and economical biological control measures against chestnut blight in forests. ACCF supports American chestnut research and engages senior citizens, school children, volunteers, and professionals, which allows them to help in planting, grafting, and managing this research.

Breeding for blight resistance is currently pursued by two separate foundations: The American Chestnut Foundation (TACF) and the American Chestnut Cooperators Foundation. TACF is developing advanced hybrids and building on the work of earlier breeders to improve tree form while enhancing resistance. The American Chestnut Cooperators Foundation is not using Oriental genes for blight resistance, intercrossing among American chestnuts selected for native resistance to the blight.

The ACCF defines its breeding strategy as "All-American intercrosses". John Rush Elkins, a research chemist and professor emeritus of chemistry at Concord University, and Gary Griffin, professor of plant pathology at Virginia Tech, think that there may be several different characteristics which favor blight resistance. They intercross among resistant American chestnuts from many locations and expect to improve upon the levels of blight resistance to make an American chestnut that can compete in the forest.

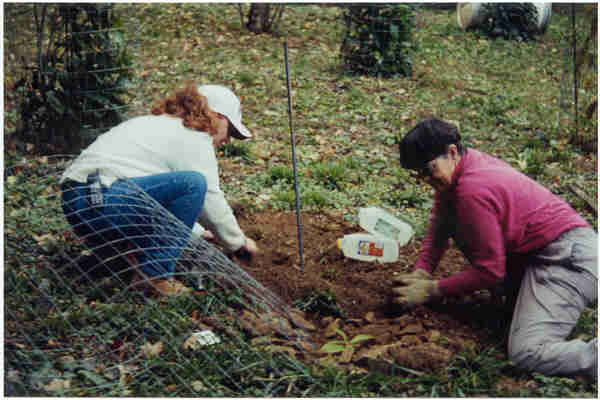
Planting nutgrafts of blight resistant American chestnuts in an ACCF research orchard

Professor Griffin developed a scale for assessing levels of blight resistance which makes it possible to make selections scientifically. Griffin inoculated five-year-old chestnuts with a standard lethal strain of the blight fungus and measured growth of the cankers. Chestnuts with no resistance to blight make rapid-growing, sunken cankers that are deep and kill tissue right to the wood. Resistant chestnuts make slow-growing, swollen cankers that are superficial; live tissue can be recovered under these cankers. The level of blight resistance is judged by periodic measurement of cankers.

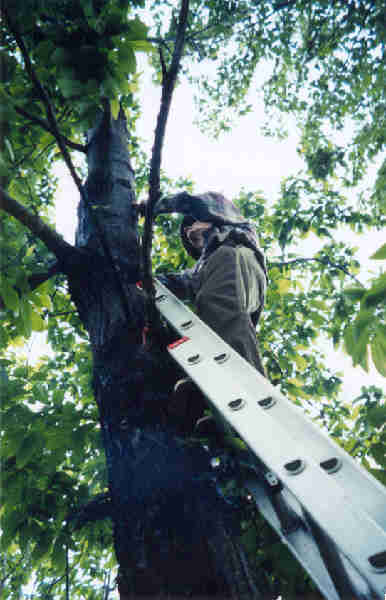
Gary Griffin inspecting superficial blight cankers on grafted resistant American chestnut

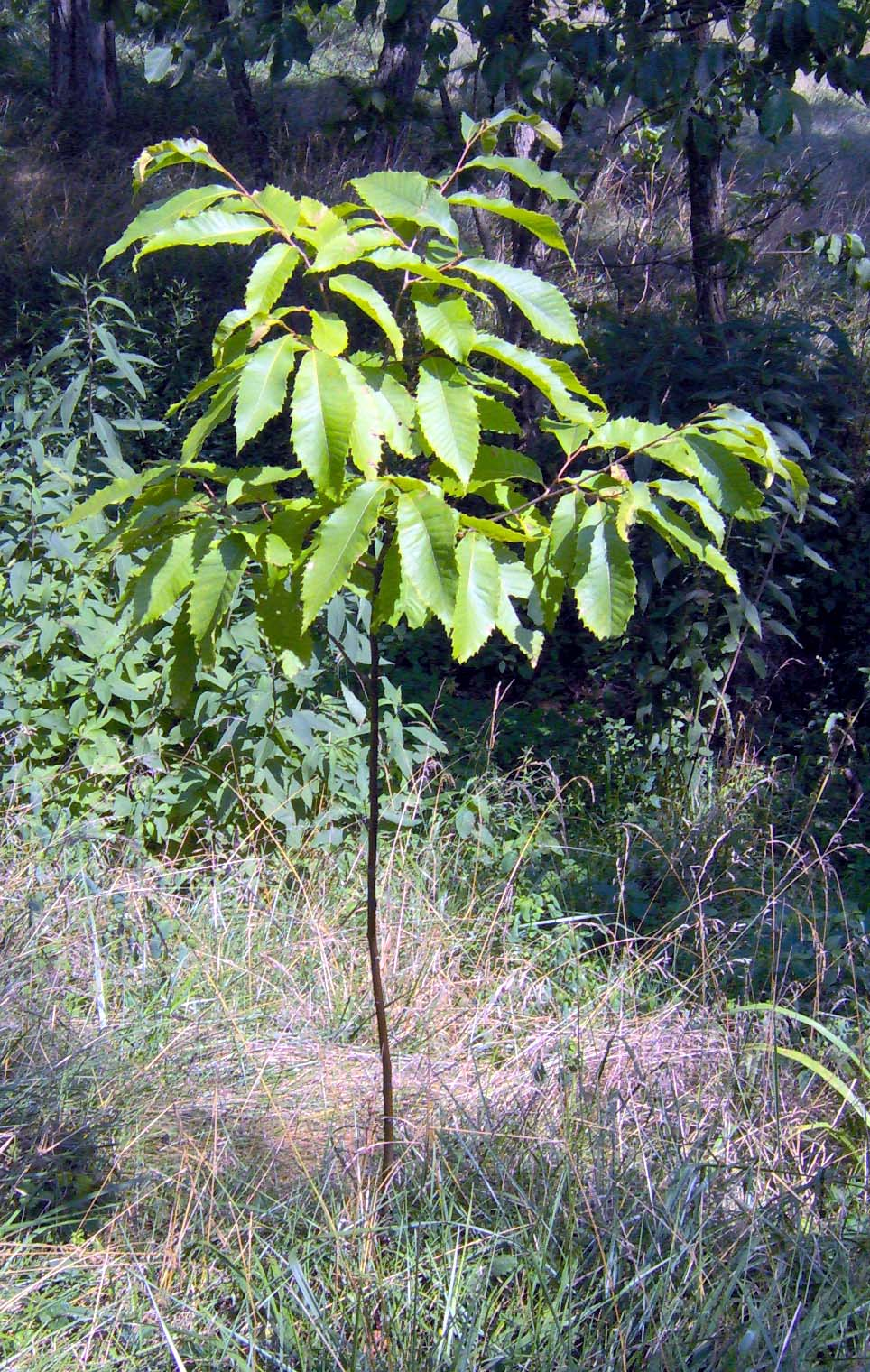
American chestnut field trial sapling from the ACCF

Grafts from large survivors of the blight epidemic were evaluated following inoculations, and controlled crosses among resistant Americans were made beginning in 1980. The first all-American intercrosses are planted in Virginia Tech's Martin American Chestnut Planting in Giles County, VA, and in Beckley, WV. They were inoculated in 1990 and evaluated in 1991 & 1992. Nine of them showed resistance equal to their parents and four of these had resistance comparable to hybrids in the same test.

It appears that inheritance of resistance requires genes of two trees with good combining ability from each source location. More generations of controlled crosses may be required to make American chestnuts produce blight resistance that is regularly inherited by seednuts. It takes at least 7 years for an American chestnut to produce nuts, new trees must be at least 5 years old before their resistance can be tested by inoculation, and the test requires 2 years for evaluation. Some of this time may be saved by utilizing grafts, and further progress may result from Elkins' studies underway which are trying to locate chemical markers for resistance. In the meanwhile, ACCF plantings of all-American intercrosses are producing, from open pollinations, large nut crops.
