= Hebron, Wisconsin =

- Town
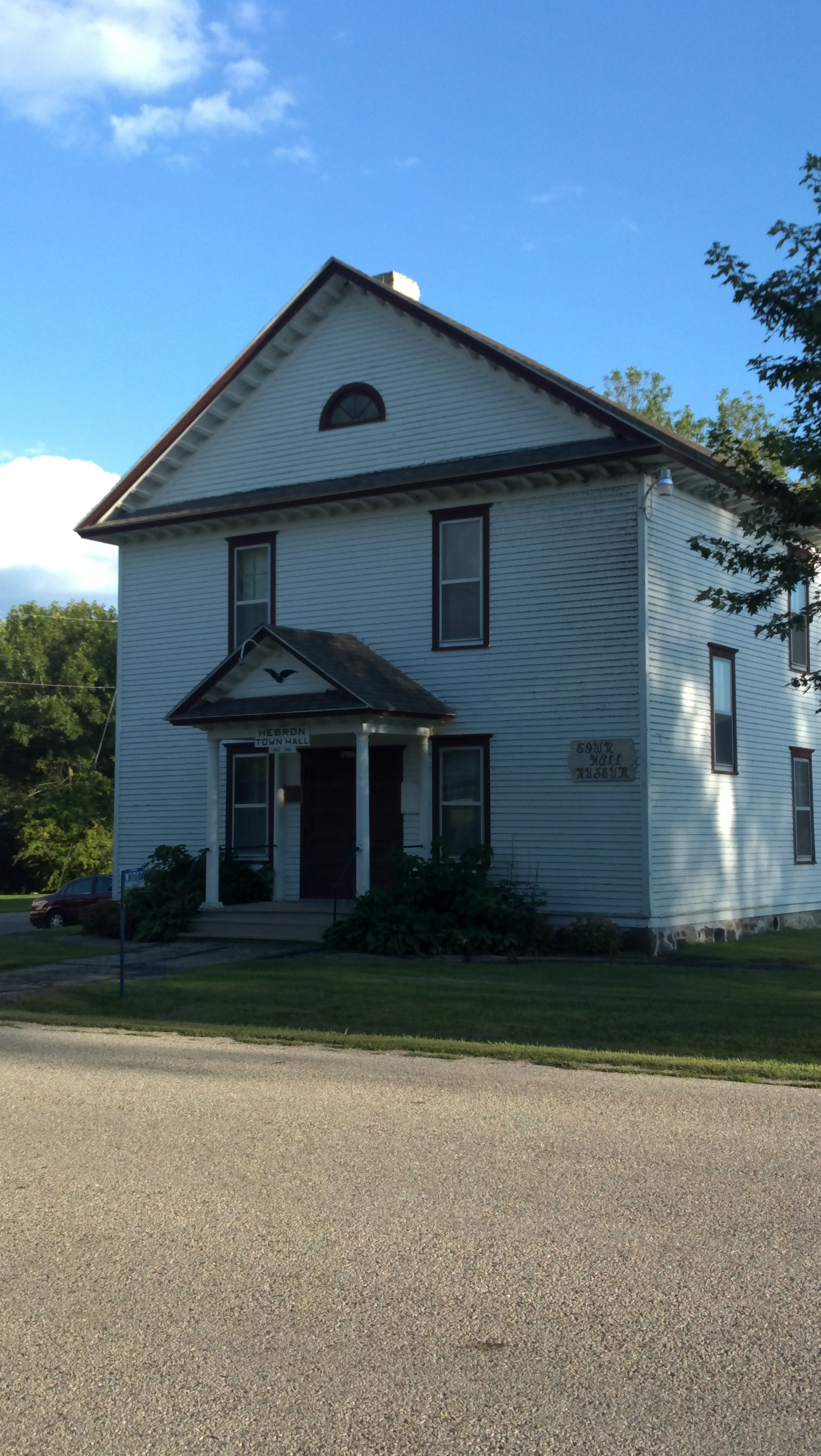
- Hebron Town Hall

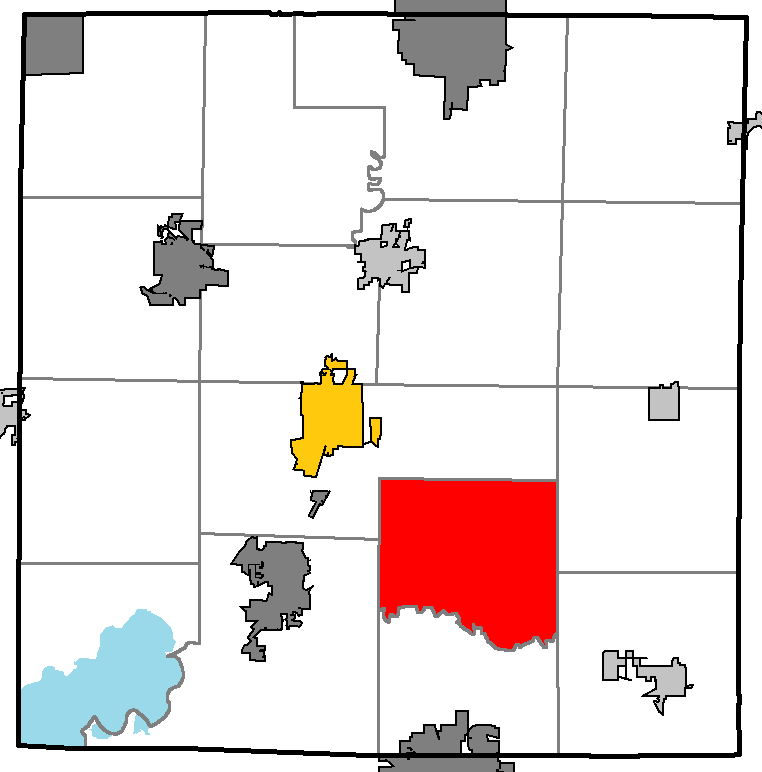
- Location of Hebron, within Jefferson County

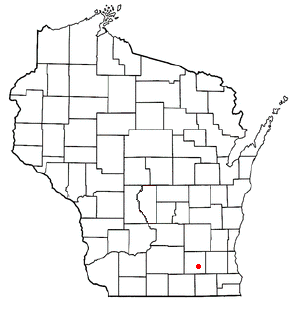
- Location of Hebron, Wisconsin
- Coordinates: 42°56′48″N 88°41′58″W
- Country: United States
- State: Wisconsin
- County: Jefferson

Area
  - Total: 29.0 sq mi (75.0 km^{2})
  - Land: 28.8 sq mi (74.7 km^{2})
  - Water: 0.12 sq mi (0.3 km^{2})
- Elevation: 820 ft (250 m)

Population (2020)
  - Total: 1,043
  - Density: 36.2/sq mi (14.0/km^{2})
- Time zone: UTC-6 (Central (CST))
  - Summer (DST): UTC-5 (CDT)
- FIPS code: 55-33700
- GNIS feature ID: 1583375

Hebron is a town in Jefferson County, Wisconsin, United States. The population was 1,043 at the 2020 census. The census-designated place of Hebron is located in the town.

== History ==
The first steps toward the settlement of the town of Hebron, state of Wisconsin, Jefferson County, was made by the Rock river claim company, who, December 20, 1835, made a claim of about half a section of land on section 2, embracing a water-power formed by Bark river. This company consisted of sixteen persons, among whom were, Solomon Juneau, Dwight Foster, Jonas Folts, Enoch G. Darling, Elisha W. Ajitant David Sergeant, Milo Jones, George Homer, Lu I. Barber, Daniel Wells, William Paine, William Brown, Thomas Holmes and John Gale. The next year the company commenced the erection of a sawmill, under the superintendence of Alvin Foster. And notwithstanding the many inconveniences resulting from high prices, scarcity of provisions, and the difficulty of transportation, the company pushed forward the enterprise. They completed the mill in the fall and winter of 1836 and ‘37. In the spring of 1837, it was set an operation by Enoch G. Darling, one of the company—and took the name of the Bark River Mills. The company continued the ownership until the fall of 1839, when it passed into the hands of Daniel Wells, of Milwaukee; and subsequently into the hands of the John F. Fields, the hand from him it was purchased, November 4, 1844, by Joseph Powers, the present proprietor. Near the mills was erected a mill house, by Enoch G. Darling, in the summer of 1837—a framed building, and the first erected in the county.

About this time, Horace Churchell, Cyrus Cushman, Samuel M. Jones, and Darius F. Jones, settled in the town near the mills, but did not to any extent turn their attention to farming—the lumbering interest absorbing their attention. From this time up to the spring of 1842, the town was only visited by the inhabitants of the surrounding prairies and openings on account of its lumbering interest, and by the Indians in winter as a safe and comfortable retreat, and to hunt the deer with which the woods abounded. In the spring and fall of 1842, it commenced settling with great rigidity.

The territorial legislature of 1846 passed an act taking three towns from Bark River; the town of Sullivan, the town of Palmyra and the town of Tunbridge. The latter was town 6, range 15 east, now the north half of Hebron and the east part of Jefferson, leaving town 5, range 15 east, as Bark River.

“This division was not satisfactory to the people of Bark River, as there was a continuous jangle between the residents living east and west of the river (Bark). Brinks Mills wish to be considered the hub, while denizens on the west side were just as strenuous for Bark Mills. While the two towns were together in 1846, the town meeting was held at Brink Mills, and a compromise ticket elected, namely: Jonas Folts, chairman; Elijah T. Williams, Samuel Wing, supervisors; Ebenezer Giles, town clerk; D. B. Peck, J. K. Pike, P.A. Feuner, justices of the peace; Nelson Fryer, assessor; Noah Grover, collector; Isaac Joslin, Noah Grover and Elijah Higgins, constables. The residents on the west side of the river secured nine of the twelve officers.

“The act creating the town of Tunbridge, designated the house of Cyrus Cushman as the place for holding the first town meeting. Willard Grant was moderator of the meeting; Stephen Benjamin McCune, clerk. (He is the octogenarian of Whitewater, whose white whiskers are turning black). The supervisors elected were: Samuel T. Clothier, chairman, S.B. McCune, John Jackson; town clerk, Edward F. Hutchins; road commissioners, Rufus H. Parker, Daniel Marble and Spencer Thayer; collector, William Reynolds; treasurer, H.J. Munroe.

“All of the officers lived on the south line of the town and on the Fort road, and out-voting the Cushman contingent, and locating the next meeting at the Munroe school house, which never occurred, as measures were on the table that ended the town of Tunbridge. There were numerous meetings held by the people of the two towns. Some at Brinks Mills and some at Bark Mills, and the question agitated of dividing the town of Bark River. Some were opposed.

“A petition that was numerously signed, was to divide the town of Tunbridge, taking the south half, and all of Bark River east of the river for a town, and all west of the river for another, and attaching the north half of Tunbridge to Jefferson. This prevailed. Laws were passed in accordance with the prayer of the petitioners. There was a great time in selecting a name. Meetings were held to select names. Most every one suggested a name.

An adjournment was had to the Munroe school house for the next week. The night agreed upon was a rainy one, and only three put in an appearance, namely, Samuel T. Clothier, William R. Case and J.R. Van Norman. A weekly singing school was held at the school house, and the singing books left on the desks. The trio were all singers, and to while away the time opened singing books, and sang piece after piece, among the Hebron. They sang the tune once, then again and again, at the suggestion of Clothier, who remarked, ‘I like this tune, and I think the name a good name for our town.’

To this the others agreed, so says Case, and the report went out that the adjourned meeting, to select a name, for the new town, had agreed upon the name of Hebron. The name met with favor, and the sentiment of the community was crystallized into law. Cold Spring was created and named the same session, the name of Bark River disappearing, as the name of a town, likewise Tunbridge. An old timer said, ‘There were many laughable features about the naming of the town.’ The late Joseph Green suggested the name of Greenbush, but was jumped upon. It was claimed he wanted to hand down his name, and that of ten children. N. P. Parsons was not in favor of having two towns, and he proposed a name for the sections lying each side of the river, "Uni," a contraction of you and I.

“The first town meeting of the town of Hebron was held April, 7th, 1847. Samuel T. Clothier, Enos J. Higbee, Seth Peter, supervisors; Seth Peter, town clerk; John Burnham, treasurer; committee of highways, Daniel Marble, Gideon Leavitt and Corydon Culver."

—Written for the Jefferson County Union on January 19, 1900

== Geography ==
According to the United States Census Bureau, the town has a total area of 28.9 square miles (75.0 km^{2}), of which 28.9 square miles (74.7 km^{2}) is land and 0.1 square miles (0.3 km^{2}), or 0.35%, is water.

== Demographics ==
Historical population
Census	Pop.	Note	%±
2000	1,135		—
2010	1,094		−3.6%
2020	1,043		−4.7%
U.S. Decennial Census

As of the census of 2000, there were 1,135 people, 391 households, and 303 families residing in the town. The population density was 39.3 people per square mile (15.2/km^{2}). There were 410 housing units at an average density of 14.2 per square mile (5.5/km^{2}). The racial makeup of the town was 98.68% White, 0.18% Black or African American, 0.53% Native American, 0.09% Asian, 0.09% from other races, and 0.44% from two or more races. 2.38% of the population were Hispanic or Latino of any race.

There were 391 households, out of which 39.9% had children under the age of 18 living with them, 67.8% were married couples living together, 5.9% had a female householder with no husband present, and 22.3% were non-families. 17.9% of all households were made up of individuals, and 7.2% had someone living alone who was 65 years of age or older. The average household size was 2.86 and the average family size was 3.24.

In the town, the population was spread out, with 28.7% under the age of 18, 6.9% from 18 to 24, 30.5% from 25 to 44, 24.5% from 45 to 64, and 9.4% who were 65 years of age or older. The median age was 37 years. For every 100 females, there were 98.4 males. For every 100 females age 18 and over, there were 97.8 males.

The median income for a household in the town was $53,929, and the median income for a family was $53,750. Males had a median income of $33,594 versus $23,750 for females. The per capita income for the town was $20,516. About 1.6% of families and 3.5% of the population were below the poverty line, including 0.7% of those under age 18 and 3.7% of those age 65 or over.

== Notable people ==
- Jonas Folts, farmer and legislator, lived in the town
- Charles Burnham, geneticist, born in the town.
