= Jonas Folts =

19th century American politician

Jonas Folts (March 12, 1808 – June 24, 1876) was an American farmer, politician, and Wisconsin pioneer. He was a member of the Wisconsin State Assembly, representing southeast Jefferson County during the 1868 session. He was also a delegate from Jefferson County to Wisconsin's 2nd constitutional convention, which produced the Constitution of Wisconsin.

== Biography ==
Born in Herkimer, New York, Folts moved to what is now Milwaukee, Wisconsin, in 1835. At that time the area was still part of the Michigan Territory. A year later, he moved west to what is now the town of Summit, Waukesha County, Wisconsin. In 1843, Folts moved to Hebron, Wisconsin Territory. He was a farmer and bookkeeper. He served as register of deeds in 1846 for Jefferson County and then served as a delegate to Wisconsin's second constitutional convention (Winter of 1847–1848). Then, in 1867, Folts was elected to the Wisconsin State Assembly running on the Democratic Party ticket. Folts also served as town clerk and town board chairman He died in Hebron, Wisconsin.
