= Alfred Szego =

American historian

Alfred Szego (April 9, 1914 – September 1, 1991) was a numismatic historian, who specialized in 14th-17th-century Italian coinage, coinage of ancient Rome, Greece, Carthage, Judea, Spain, medieval Austria, and 19th-century Europe.

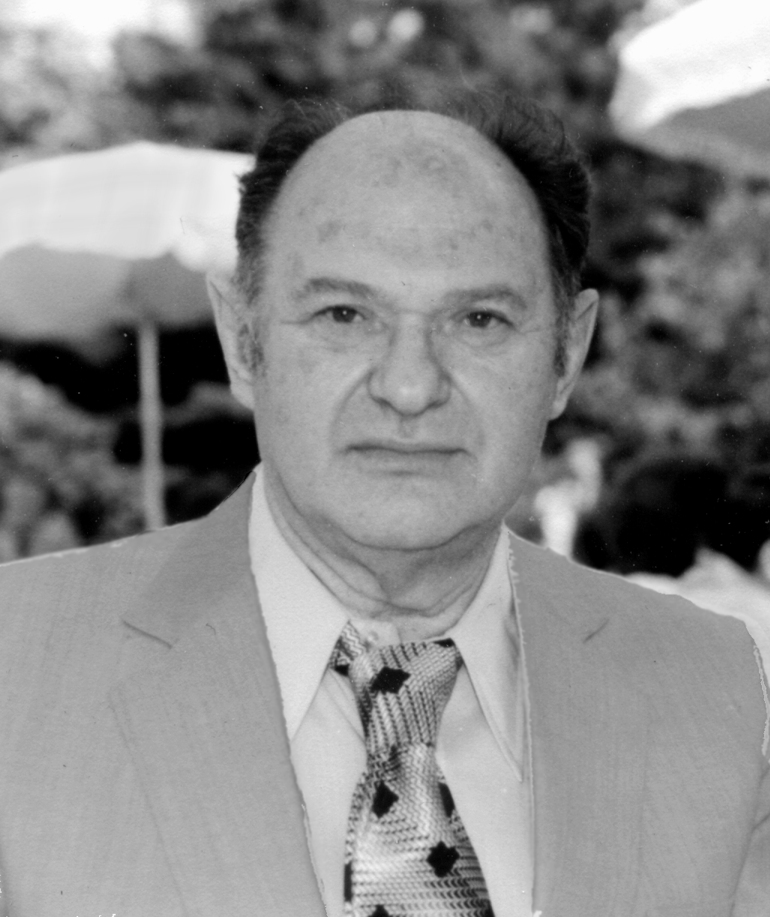
Alfred Szego

Born in New York to Oscar and Rose Szego, Jewish immigrants who emigrated from Budapest in 1912. Oldest of four children. Married Augusta, June 1940. Two children, Phillip and Carol.

Szego originally became interested in numismatics in 1955, while he was a television repairman. One of his customers offered a cache of old coins to settle a repair bill; Szego accepted the coins towards payment after studying the potential values in numismatic reference books. After this, he and his wife began to learn more about numismatics. Together, they created a thriving specialty business, concentrating on coinage of Ancient Rome, the Holy Roman Empire, and Medieval Austria. Szego authored and hand-illustrated "The Coinage of Medieval Austria," which he completed in October 1970. He also reprinted rare reference books on the subject of central European coinage, including "Schlesische Munzenund Medallien" by Hugo Freiherrn von Saurma-Jeltsch (ISBN 978-3-924438-02-9); "Italian Coinage Medieval to Modern;" The Collection of Ercole Gnecchi.

In 1969, Szego and his wife, Augusta, were involved in a deadly two car crash in which Augusta sustained minor injuries, but a third passenger was killed; the driver of the other vehicle was arrested.

Szego was also a dedicated amateur botanist who invested his energies into performing cross breeding experiments on American Chestnut in conjunction with the Northern Nut Growers Association, seeking a chestnut-blight resistant subspecies. Due to the slow growing nature of the American Chestnut, his work set the stage for others, who are now further breeding with some success.

== Publications (Works, Bibliography) ==
- Szego, Alfred (1970). the Coinage of Medieval Austria, 1156-1521. Oakdale, New York: self-published. OCLC 775854787.
  - Primarily a derivative work, included the primary study of previously unattributed coinage that was issued during the period as well as previously untranslated material.
- Szego A (1948) Breeding chestnuts in the New York City area. Annual Report of the Northern Nut Growers Association 39:196-199
- Szego A (1953) Growing American chestnuts and their hybrids under blight conditions. Ann. Rept. No. Nut Growers Assoc. 44:154-156.
- Szego A (1964) Experiences with hybrid chestnuts under seashore conditions. 55:29-30.
- Szego A (1968) New chestnuts for the northeastern states. Ann. Rept. No. Nut Growers Assoc. 59:87-92.
- Szego A (1969) New and little known facts about chestnuts. 60:27-30
- Szego A (1970) Experiences with various chestnut species and their hybrids on eastern Long Island. 61:77-81.
- Szego A (1980) Hypovirulence and chestnut breeding. 71:33-35.
