= William Powell (biologist) =

American biologist (d. 2023)

William Powell (died November 12, 2023) was an American biologist.

He was a professor of biology at the State University of New York College of Environmental Science and Forestry from 1983 until 2022.

In 1989, he founded the American Chestnut Research and Restoration Project with fellow ESF professor Charles Maynard. The project developed the Darling 58 chestnut.

== Education ==
Powell has a BS in biology with honors from Salisbury State University and a PhD in Biology from Utah State University.

== Career ==
In 1989, Powell and Charles Maynard founded the American Chestnut Research and Restoration Project.

== Awards and honors ==
In 2013, Powell was made Forest Biotechnologist of the Year by the Institute of Forest Biotechnology. In 2023, Powell and Maynard received the New York State Commendation Award for their work on the American Chestnut.
