= Hebron Town Hall =

- U.S. National Register of Historic Places
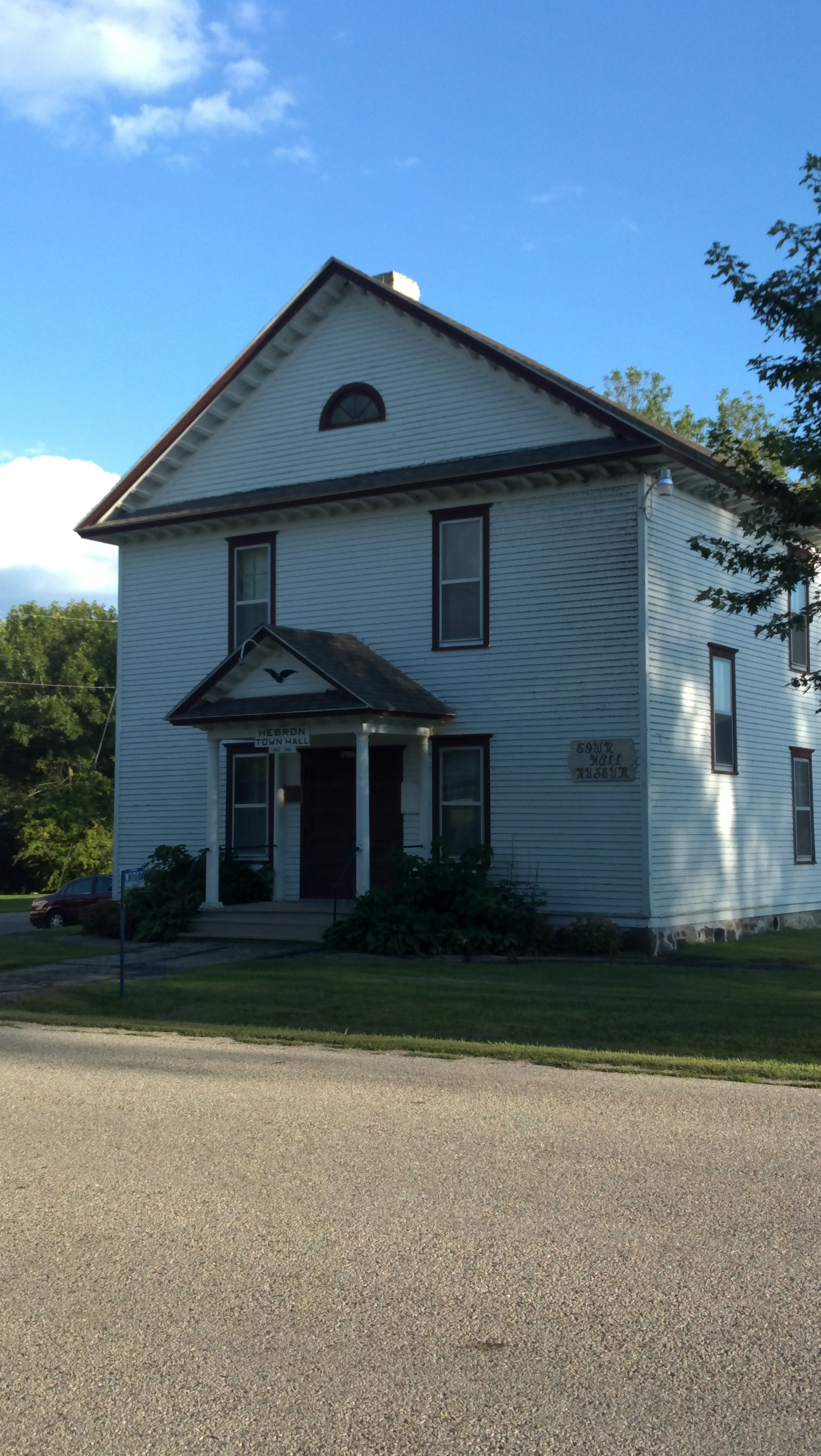
- Hebron Town Hall
- Location: W3087 Green Isle Dr., Hebron, Wisconsin
- Coordinates: 42°55′31″N 88°41′19″W
- Area: less than one acre
- Built: 1902
- Architectural style: Neoclassical
- NRHP reference No.: 02001666
- Added to NRHP: December 31, 2002

The Hebron Town Hall is located in Hebron, Wisconsin.

== History ==
The building served as the town hall until 1981. It has also served as a polling station during elections and has hosted events including plays, dances and art exhibitions. Currently, it serves as a museum operated by the Black River Woods Historical Society. It was added to the State and the National Register of Historic Places in 2002.
