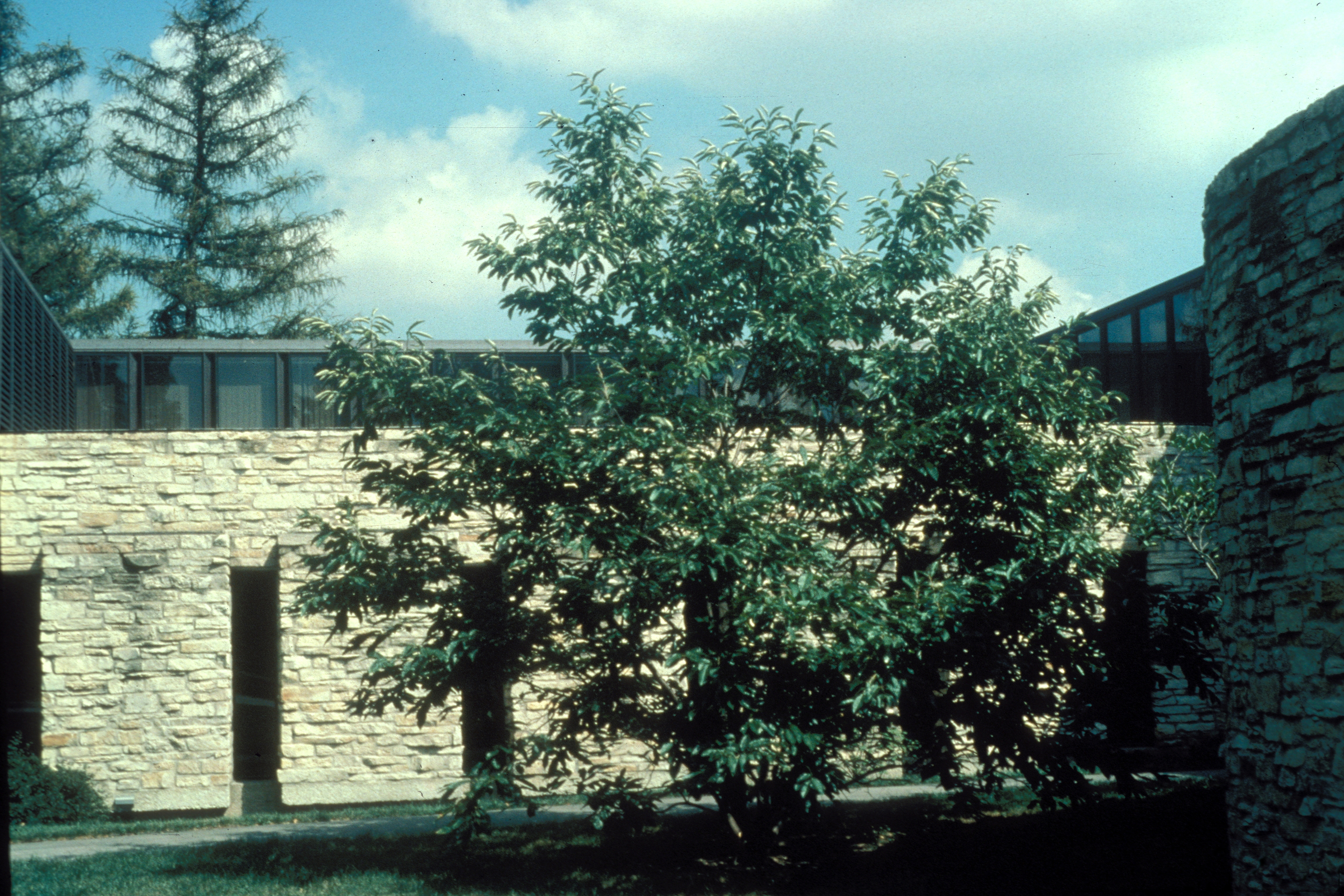

Conservation status
- Least Concern (IUCN 3.1)

Scientific classification
- Kingdom: Plantae
- Clade: Embryophytes
- Clade: Tracheophytes
- Clade: Spermatophytes
- Clade: Angiosperms
- Clade: Eudicots
- Clade: Rosids
- Order: Fagales
- Family: Fagaceae
- Genus: Castanea
- Species: C. mollissima

Binomial name
- Castanea mollissima Blume

Synonyms
- Castanea bungeana Blume; Castanea duclouxii Dode; Castanea formosana (Hayata) Hayata; Castanea hupehensis Dode; Castanea mollissima var. pendula X.Y.Zhou & Z.D.Zhou; Castanea sativa var. bungeana (Blume) Pamp.; Castanea sativa var. formosana Hayata; Castanea sativa var. intermedia Pamp.; Castanea sativa var. mollissima (Blume) Pamp.; Castanea sinensis Perr.; Castanea vulgaris var. yunnanensis Fr.

= Castanea mollissima =

Chinese chestnut

Species of tree

Castanea mollissima, also known as the Chinese chestnut, is an Asian species of chestnut tree in the family Fagaceae.

== Description ==
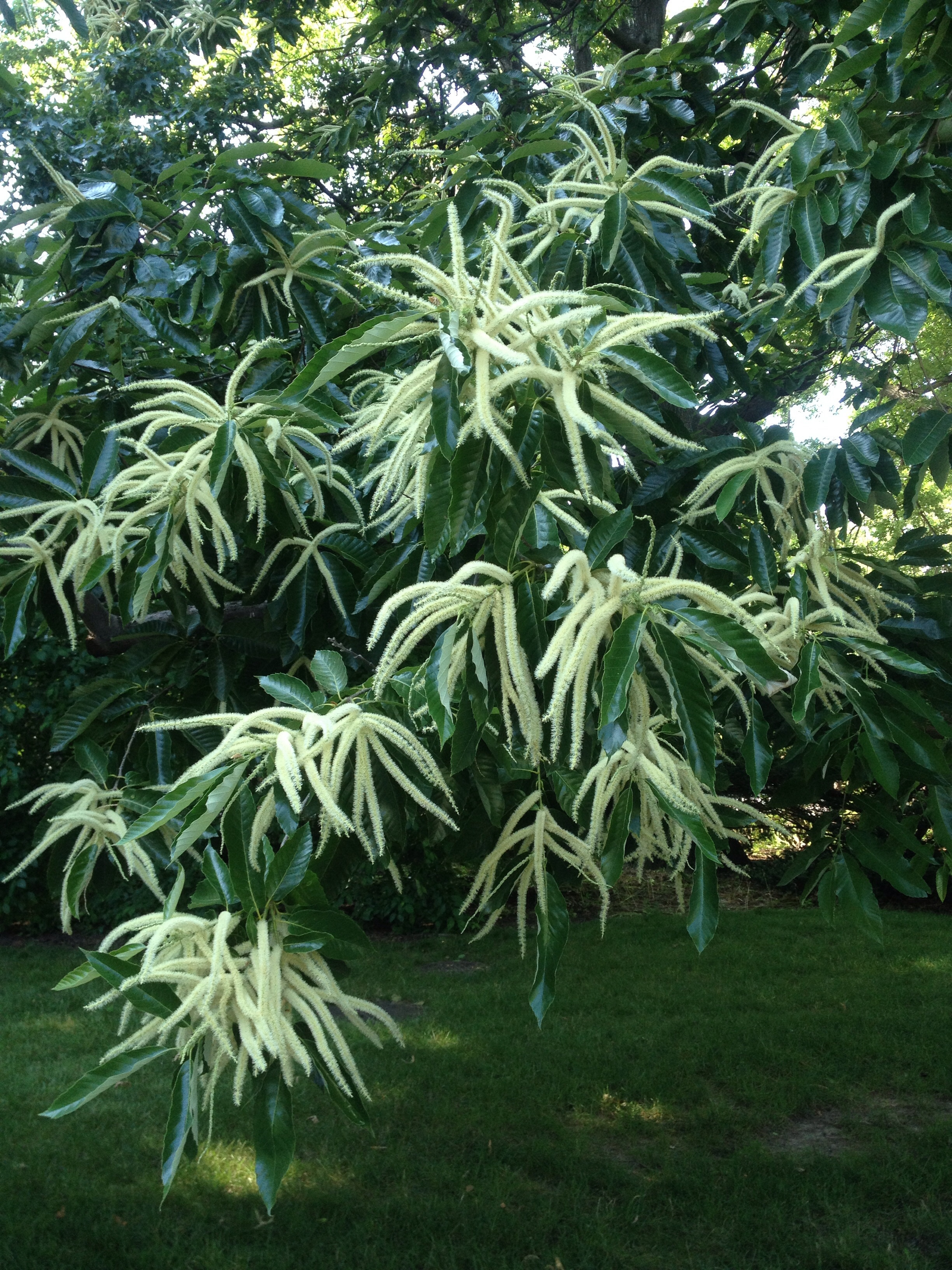
Leaf and flower detail of a Chinese chestnut at New York Botanical Garden

It is a deciduous tree growing to 20 metres (66 ft) tall with a broad crown. The leaves are alternate, simple, 10–22 centimetres (4–8 1/2 in) long and 4.5–8 cm (1 3/4–3 1/4 in) broad, with a toothed margin. The flowers are produced in catkins 4–20 cm (1 1/2–7 3/4 in) long, with the female flowers at the base of the catkin and males on the rest. The fruit is a densely spiny cupule 4–8 cm (1 1/2–3 1/4 in) diameter, containing two or three glossy brown nuts; these are 2–3 cm (3/4–1 1/4 in) diameter on wild trees. The scientific name mollissima derives from the softly downy shoots and young leaves.

== Taxonomy ==
Synonyms: Castanea bungeana Blume; C. duclouxii Dode; C. fargesii Dode; C. formosana (Hayata) Hayata; C. hupehensis Dode; C. mollissima var. pendula X. Y. Zhou & Z. D. Zhou; C. sativa Miller var. formosana Hayata; C. sativa var. mollissima (Blume) Pampanini; C. vulgaris Lamarck var. yunnanensis Franchet.

== Distribution and habitat ==
The species is native to China, Taiwan, and Korea.

Chinese chestnut has been cultivated in East Asia for millennia and its exact original range cannot be determined. In the provinces of Anhui, Fujian, Gansu, Guangdong, Guangxi, Guizhou, Hebei, Henan, Hubei, Hunan, Jiangsu, Jiangxi, Liaoning, Nei Mongol, Qinghai, Shaanxi, Shandong, Shanxi, Sichuan, Xizang, Yunnan, and Zhejiang, and also to Taiwan and Korea. It grows close to sea level in the north of its range, and at elevations of up to 2,800 m in the south of the range. The species prefers full sun and acidic, loamy soil, and has a medium growth rate.

== Ecology ==
When cultivated close to other species of chestnut (including Japanese chestnut, American chestnut and sweet chestnut), Chinese chestnut readily cross-pollinates with them to form hybrids.

Chinese chestnuts have evolved over a long period of time in coexistence with the bark fungal disease chestnut blight (Cryphonectria parasitica, formerly Endothia parasitica), and have evolved a very successful resistance to the blight, probably more so than any other species of chestnut, so that, although it is not immune, it typically sustains no more than minor damage when infected. It's important to realize, though, that Chinese chestnut trees vary considerably in blight resistance. Some individuals are quite susceptible while others are essentially immune to the disease. Japanese chestnut is also comparatively resistant to blight, with European chestnut somewhat less so. In the 1890s, Chinese and Japanese chestnuts were imported to the United States with the intention of utilizing them as orchard trees due to their small, compact size compared to the towering American chestnut. The results unfortunately were disastrous as the imported Asian species introduced blight to which C. dentata lacked any resistance. The disease was first noticed on a tree in the Bronx Zoo in 1904 and quickly spread out of control, ravaging American chestnut trees. Within 30 years, there were virtually none left in their native range. An active program has been pursued in North America to cross-breed the Chinese and American chestnuts to try to maximize various desirable traits of the American chestnut, such as larger stature, greater nut sweetness, while also isolating and carrying the blight resistance from the Chinese chestnut.

The nuts provide a significant food source for wildlife.

Chinese chestnuts, roasted
Nutritional value per 100 g (3.5 oz)
- Energy: 1,000 kJ (240 kcal)
- Carbohydrates: 52.36 g
- Fat: 1.19 g
- Saturated: 0.175 g
- Monounsaturated: 0.620 g
- Polyunsaturated: 0.307 g
- Protein: 4.48 g
Amino acids
Tryptophan	0.052 g
Threonine	0.178 g
Isoleucine	0.167 g
Leucine	0.276 g
Lysine	0.243 g
Methionine	0.108 g
Cystine	0.117 g
Phenylalanine	0.203 g
Tyrosine	0.134 g
Valine	0.235 g
Arginine	0.459 g
Histidine	0.129 g
Alanine	0.213 g
Aspartic acid	0.909 g
Glutamic acid	0.573 g
Glycine	0.196 g
Proline	0.172 g
Serine	0.196 g
Vitamins and minerals
Vitamins	Quantity %DV^{†}
Vitamin A equiv.	0% 0 μg
Thiamine (B1)	13% 0.150 mg
Riboflavin (B2)	7% 0.090 mg
Niacin (B3)	9% 1.500 mg
Pantothenic acid (B5)	12% 0.592 mg
Vitamin B6	26% 0.437 mg
Folate (B9)	18% 72 μg
Vitamin B12	0% 0.00 μg
Vitamin C	43% 38.4 mg
Minerals	Quantity %DV^{†}
Calcium	1% 19 mg
Copper	43% 0.387 mg
Iron	8% 1.50 mg
Magnesium	21% 90 mg
Manganese	74% 1.708 mg
Phosphorus	8% 102 mg
Potassium	16% 477 mg
Sodium	0% 4 mg
Zinc	8% 0.93 mg
- Other constituents: Quantity
- Water: 40.20 g
- Link to USDA Database entry
- ^{†}Percentages estimated using US recommendations for adults, except for potassium, which is estimated based on expert recommendation from the National Academies.

== Uses ==
The nuts are edible, and the tree is widely cultivated in eastern Asia; over 300 cultivars have been selected for nut production, subdivided into five major regional groups: Northern, Yangtze River Valley, Sichuan and Guizhou, Southern, and Southwestern. Besides that, the Dandong chestnut (belonging to the Japanese chestnut – Castanea crenata) is a major cultivar in Liaoning Province. Some cultivars, such as 'Kuling', 'Meiling', and 'Nanking', have large nuts up to 4 cm diameter. The nuts are sweet, and considered by some to have the best taste of any chestnut, though others state they are not as good as the American chestnut.

In Vietnam, Chinese chestnuts which are grown in Trùng Khánh district, Cao Bằng province have highest quality with 3.3-5.4% glucose, 43.36–46.47% glucid, 1.16–2% lipid, 3.12–3.62% protein analyzed by Vietnam National Vegetable and Fruit Researching Institution in 1999.
