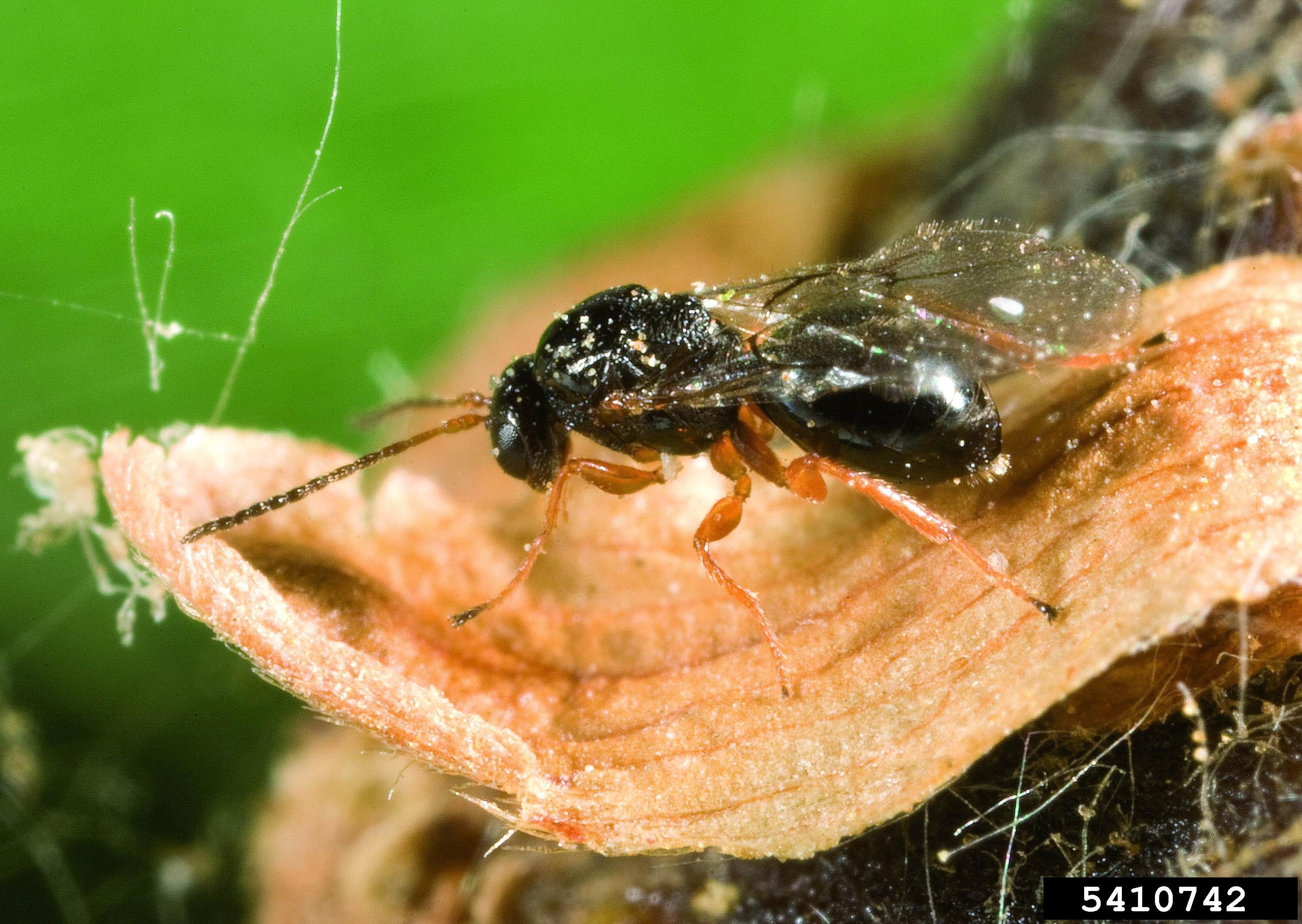

Scientific classification
- Kingdom: Animalia
- Phylum: Arthropoda
- Class: Insecta
- Order: Hymenoptera
- Family: Cynipidae
- Genus: Dryocosmus
- Species: D. kuriphilus

Binomial name
- Dryocosmus kuriphilus Yasumatsu, 1951

= Dryocosmus kuriphilus =

Species of wasp

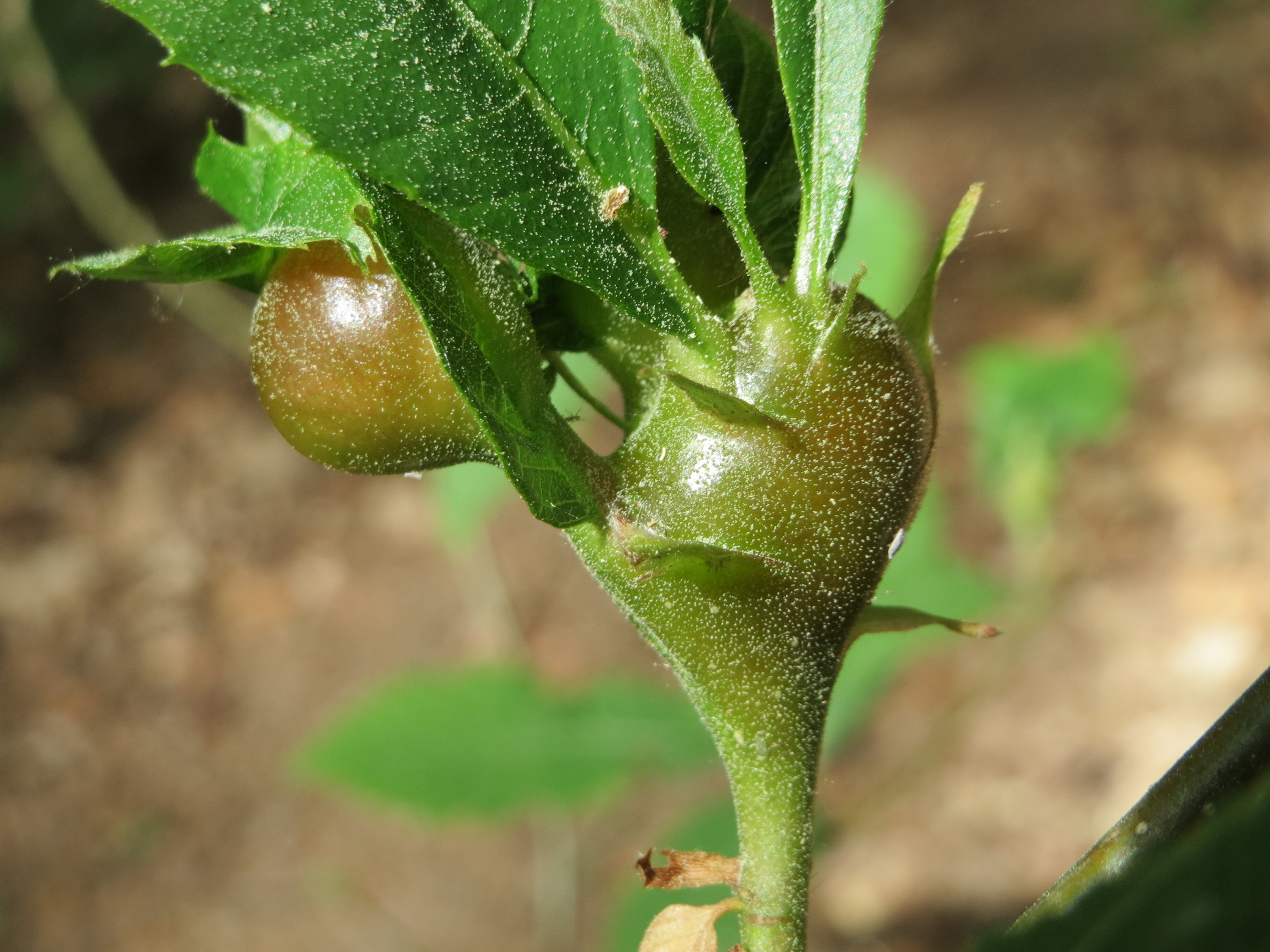
Galls caused by Dryocosmus kuriphilus on sweet chestnut

Dryocosmus kuriphilus is a species of gall wasp known by the common names chestnut gall wasp, Oriental chestnut gall wasp, and Asian chestnut gall wasp. It is native to China and it is known in many other parts of the world, particularly the Northern Hemisphere, as an introduced species and an invasive horticultural pest. It attacks many species of chestnut (genus Castanea), including most cultivated varieties. It is considered the world's worst pest of chestnuts.

== Distribution ==
When it was first discovered, the wasp was considered to be a species of Biorhiza. It was given its current name in 1951, when it was formally described. By this time it had invaded Japan and was attacking chestnuts there. It is now in Korea, Nepal, Italy, Slovenia, France, Switzerland and other parts of Europe including Flanders, Belgium, and the southeastern United States.

== Life history and ecology ==
The adult female wasp is 2.5 to 3 millimeters long and shiny black in color with brown legs. It produces stalked white eggs, each about 0.2 millimeters long, and the larva is white and about 2.5 millimeters long. The adult male of the species has never been observed.

The female lays eggs in the buds of chestnut trees, sometimes producing over 100 eggs. The wasp is thelytokous, producing fertile eggs by parthenogenesis, without fertilization by a male. Oviposition occurs in the summer. Larvae hatch from the eggs but do not begin growing immediately. Their growth begins the following spring, when the tree buds begin to develop. At this time, the larvae induce the formation of galls on the tree. The galls are green or pinkish and up to 2 centimeters wide. The larvae develop inside the protective gall structures and emerge from them as adults. The galls dry out and become woody. The galls can be very damaging to the tree. They occur on the new growth of the tree, disrupting the fruiting process, and can reduce a tree's yield up to 70%. They are even known to kill trees. The wasp can fly, but it is distributed to new territory more often by human activity, such as the planting of new trees and the transport of infested wood.

The presence of galls can also increase the likelihood of the tree's becoming infected with chestnut blight, a condition caused by the fungus Cryphonectria parasitica. The opened gall left by the wasp after it matures and departs may be an entrance through which the fungus can infest the tree's tissues. The galls can also become infected by the sweet chestnut pathogen Gnomoniopsis smithogilvyi.

Chestnut species affected by the gall wasp include Japanese chestnut (Castanea crenata), American chestnut (C. dentata), Chinese chestnut (C. mollissima), European chestnut (C. sativa), Seguin chestnut (C. seguinii), Henry's chinquapin (C. henryi), and hybrids. So far it has not been observed on the Allegheny chinquapin (C. pumila).

Control measures include pruning infested buds off trees and protecting buds with netting. These methods are not practical for large numbers of trees, such as commercial orchards. In China, with lower labour costs, Chinese chinquapin (Castanea seguinii) is used as a trap crop. By planting a hedge of C. seguinii around C. mollissima (Chinese chestnut) orchards, the wasps will first encounter and attack the buds of the less valuable C. seguinii, allowing the galled twigs to be cut off and destroyed. Pesticides are generally not effective because the insects take cover inside the galls. One gall wasp control method which has been successful is the introduction of the torymid wasp Torymus sinensis. This parasitoid is used as an agent of biological pest control against the gall wasp in Japan. Research is underway to determine where else it might be appropriate to release the parasitoid. A number of other parasitoids have been noted with the gall wasp, including the torymids Torymus beneficus, T. geranii, and Megastigmus nipponicus, the ormyrid wasps Ormyris punctiger and O. flavitibialis, and the eurytomid wasps Eurytoma brunniventris and E. setigera. These species do not make effective control agents, as their rates of parasitism are not high.
