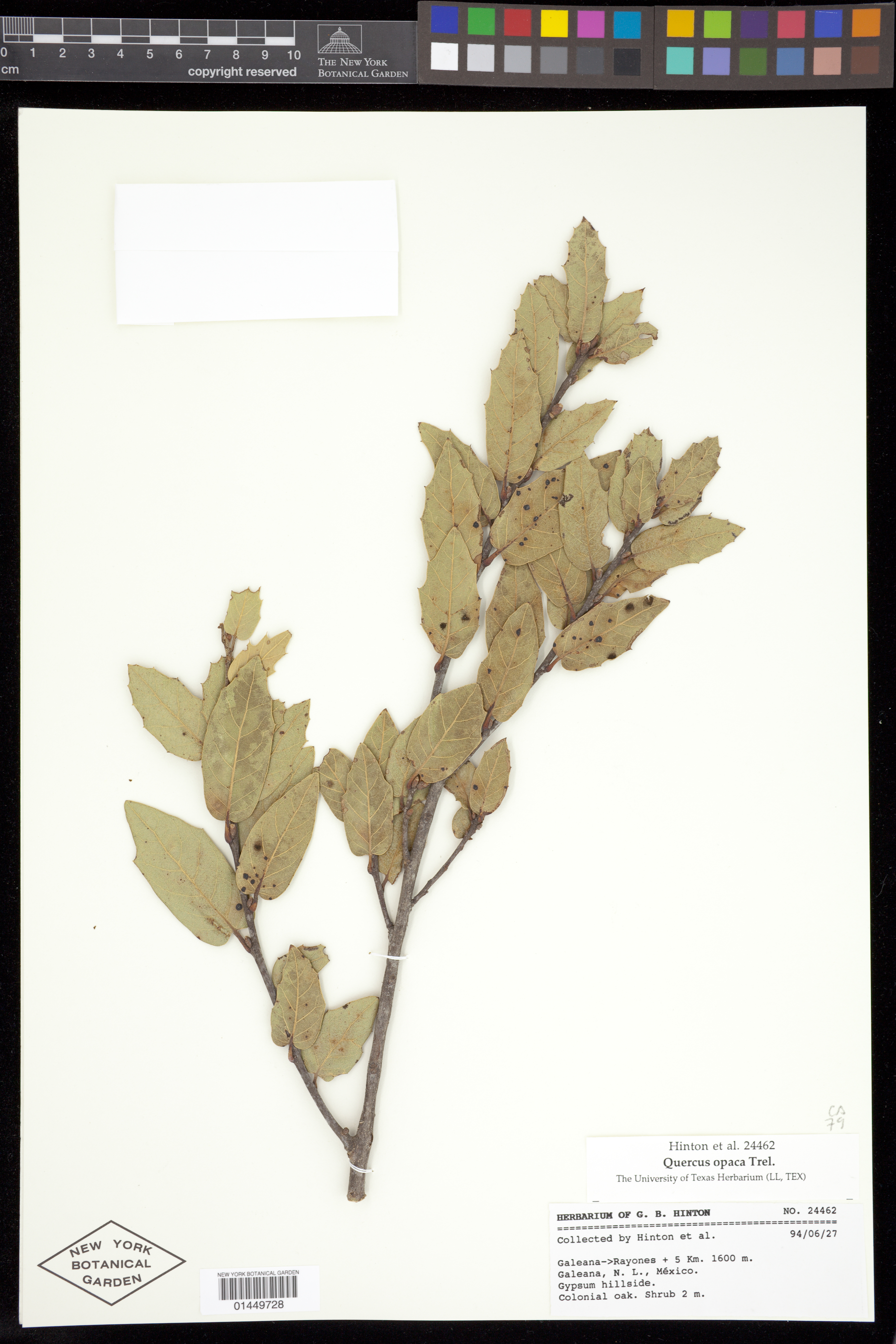

Conservation status
- Data Deficient (IUCN 3.1)

Scientific classification
- Kingdom: Plantae
- Clade: Embryophytes
- Clade: Tracheophytes
- Clade: Spermatophytes
- Clade: Angiosperms
- Clade: Eudicots
- Clade: Rosids
- Order: Fagales
- Family: Fagaceae
- Genus: Quercus
- Subgenus: Quercus subg. Quercus
- Section: Quercus sect. Quercus
- Species: Q. opaca

Binomial name
- Quercus opaca Trel. (1924)

= Quercus opaca =

Species of oak tree

Quercus opaca is a species of evergreen shrub in the genus Quercus. It is native to northeastern and central Mexico.

== Description ==
Quercus opaca typically does not exceed 2 meters in height, with an average height of around 1-1.5 metres. The leaves of Quercus opaca are evergreen. They are oblong, lanceolate to elliptic in shape, measuring approximately 2.5 to 4.5 centimetres in length and 1 to 1.5 centimetres in width. The leaf apex can be acute, obtuse, or rounded, often with a mucronate tip. The base of the leaf is typically obtuse to cordate, sometimes rounded. The leaf margin is thickened and may appear flat or slightly rolled back. Most leaves are observed to be entire, although some may possess 1-3 pairs of sharp mucronate teeth near the apex. The adaxial surface has a glaucous appearance and appears dull. Small star-shaped hairs can be found at the base of the midvein. The abaxial surface is not lustrous and also appears glaucous. There are only a few sessile stellate trichomes and white glandular hairs that are mainly present on the midvein. The epidermis of the leaf is notably whitish papillose. The leaf veins consist of 6-10 pairs that are flat above and slightly raised beneath. The petiole measures 3-7 millimeters in length and is pubescent with a reddish-brown colour.

Quercus opaca produces male catkins that are 3-4 centimetres long and contain many flowers. Quercus opaca's fruit is an ovoid acorn which measures around 9 millimetres long which is also glabrous. The acorn is partly enclosed by a cupule that is half-rounded and slightly tomentose. The acorns mature within the first year and are typically observed in September. They are solitary or appear in pairs on a glabrescent peduncle that is 0.5 centimetres long.

The bark of Quercus opaca is grey and scaly in appearance. The twigs have a diameter of 1.5-2 millimeters and are sulcate, waxy, and covered in short pubescence consisting of sessile multiradiate trichomes and glandular hairs. Over time, the twigs become glabrescent. The buds are subglobose, measuring 1-2 millimetres in width, and have a brown color with pubescent scales along the margins. The stipules are pubescent and sometimes are deciduous.

== Distribution ==
Quercus opaca is found in the states of Hidalgo, Nuevo Leon, San Luis Potosi, and Tamaulipas in Mexico. According to Plants of the World Online it ranges from Tamaulipas south to Oaxaca.

This species is native to the Mexican Plateau region. Quercus opaca lives in arid tropical scrub habitats, usually 1200-2000 meters above sea level.

== Conservation ==
Currently, there is a lack of data regarding the population size, population trends, and potential threats to the species. The absence of population data and threat assessments, along with under sampling, hinders researchers' ability to determine whether the species is at risk or not. Due to this, the International Union for Conservation of Nature classifies Quercus opaca as Data Deficient.
