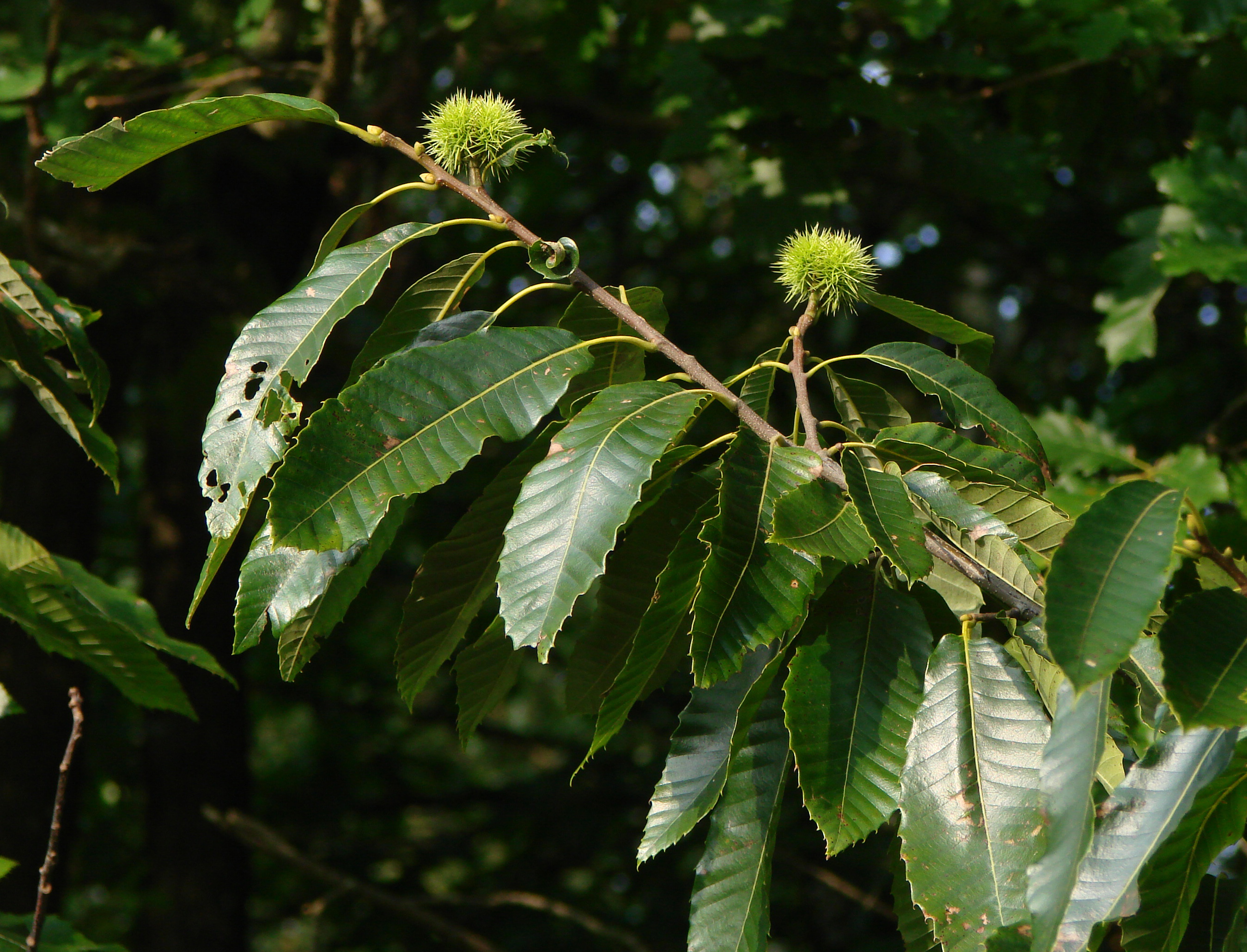
- Sweet chestnut (Castanea sativa)
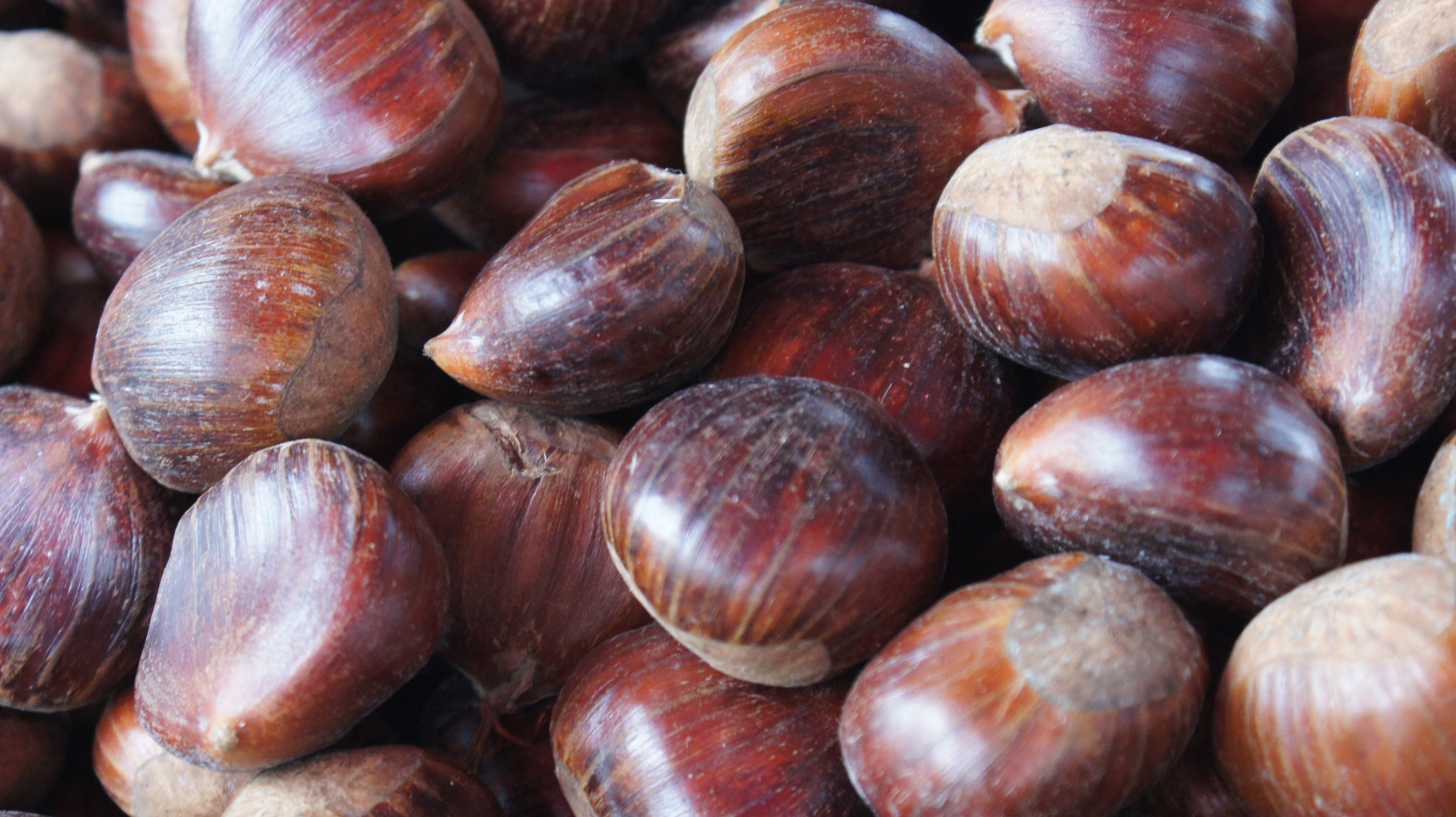
- The edible nut being sold at a market

Scientific classification
- Kingdom: Plantae
- Clade: Tracheophytes
- Clade: Angiosperms
- Clade: Eudicots
- Clade: Rosids
- Order: Fagales
- Family: Fagaceae
- Subfamily: Castaneoideae
- Genus: Castanea; Mill.

Species
- Castanea crenata; Castanea dentata; Castanea henryi; Castanea mollissima; Castanea ozarkensis; Castanea pumila; Castanea sativa; Castanea seguinii

= Chestnut =

Genus of plants

Chestnuts are the deciduous trees and shrubs in the genus Castanea, in the beech family Fagaceae. The name also refers to the edible nuts they produce. They are native to temperate regions of the Northern Hemisphere.

== Description ==
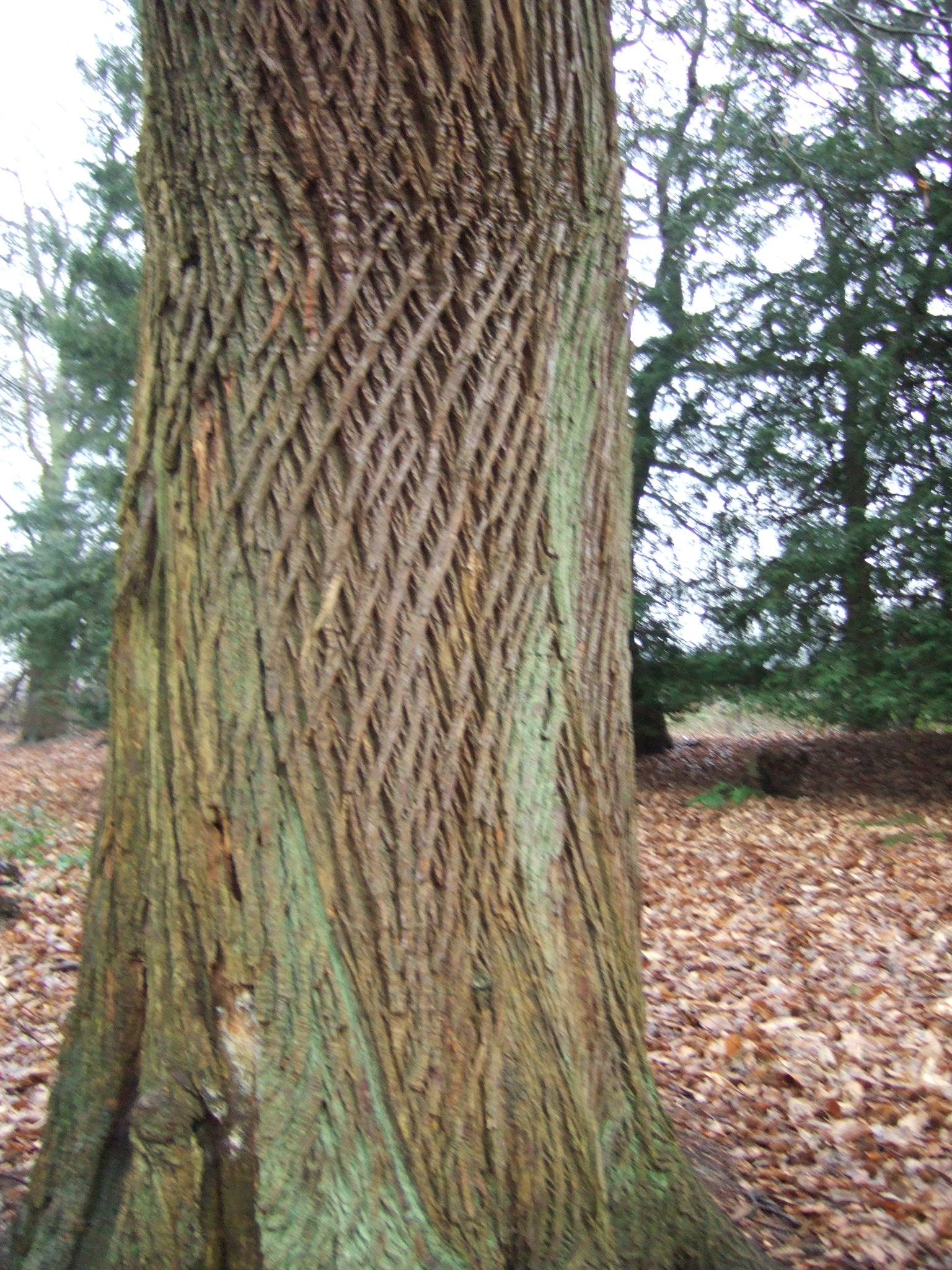
Bark of C. sativa (sweet chestnut)

Chestnut trees are of moderate growth rate (for the Chinese chestnut) to a fast growth rate (for American and European species). Their mature heights vary from the tallest, C. sativa that can reach 35–36 metres (115–118 feet), and C. dentata that can reach around 30 metres (100 feet), to the smallest species of chinkapins, often shrubby, Between these extremes are found the Japanese chestnut tree (C. crenata) at 10 m average; (Note: Some specimens can have greater bulk.) followed by the Chinese chestnut tree (C. mollissima) at about 15 m.

The Chinese and more so the Japanese chestnut trees are both often multistemmed and wide-spreading, while C. sativa and C. dentata tend to grow very erect when planted among others, with little tapering of their columnar trunks, which are firmly set and massive. When standing on their own, they spread on the sides and develop broad, rounded, dense crowns at maturity. The foliage of the European and American species has striking yellow autumn colour.

Chestnut bark is smooth when young, of a vinous maroon or red-brown colour for the American chestnut, grey for the sweet chestnut. With age, the bark becomes grey-brown and darker, thick, and deeply furrowed; the furrows run longitudinally, and tend to twist around the trunk as the tree ages, sometimes reminiscent of a large cable with twisted strands.

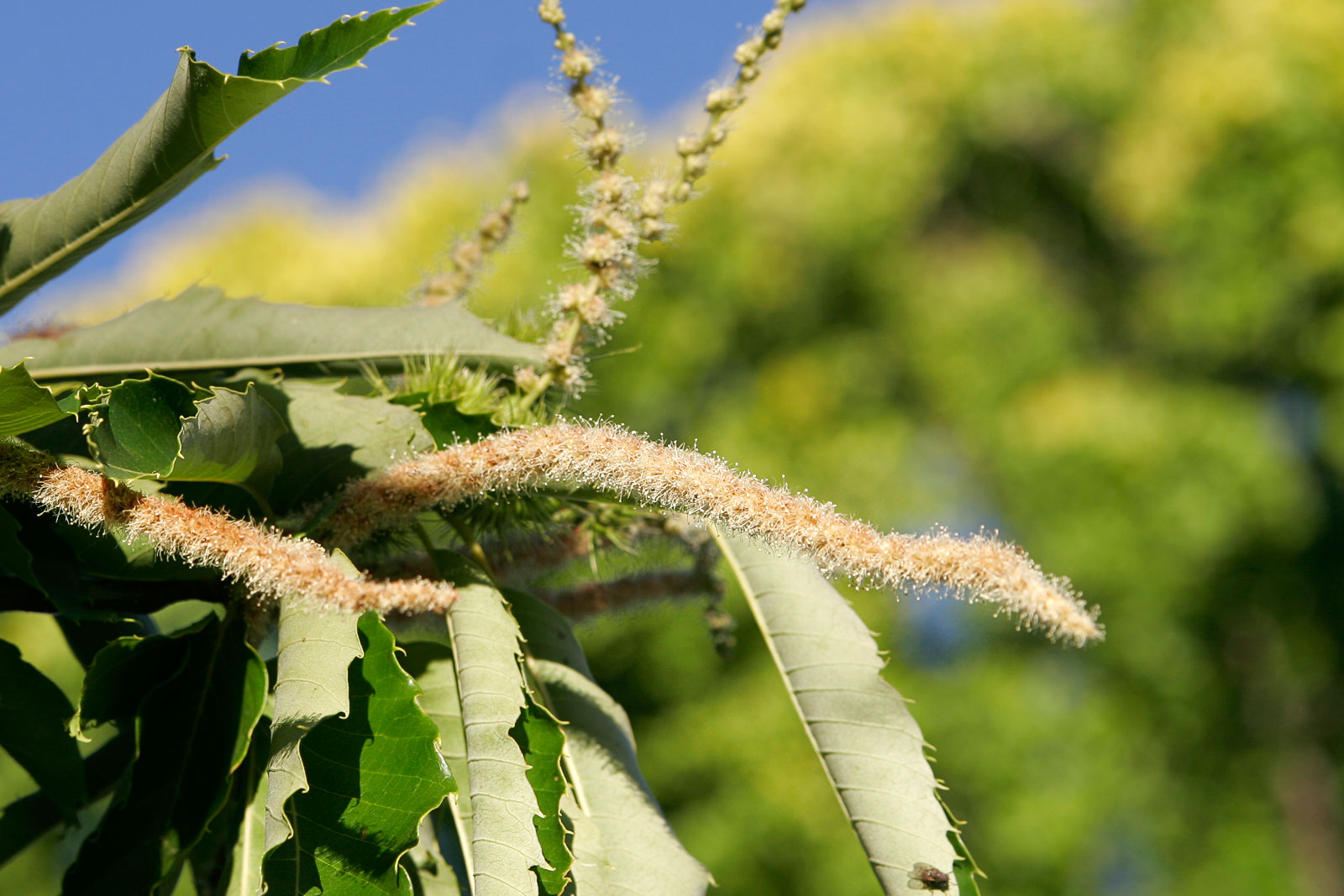
C. sativa male catkins (pale buff) and female catkins (green, spiny, partly hidden by leaves)

The leaves are simple, ovate or lanceolate, 10–32 cm long, and 4–10 cm wide, with sharply pointed, widely spaced teeth, with shallow rounded sinuates between.

The flowers follow the leaves, appearing in late spring or early summer or into July. They are arranged in long catkins of two kinds, with both kinds being borne on every tree. Some catkins are made of only male flowers, which mature first. Each flower has eight stamens, or 10 to 12 for C. mollissima. The ripe pollen carries a heavy, sweet odor that some people find too sweet or unpleasant. Other catkins have these pollen-bearing flowers, but also carry near the twig from which these spring, small clusters of female or fruit-producing flowers. Two or three flowers together form a four-lobed prickly calybium, which ultimately grows completely together to make the brown hull, or husk, covering the fruit.

Chestnut flowers are not self-compatible, so two trees are required for pollination. All Castanea species readily hybridize with each other.

=== Fruit ===
The fruit is contained in a spiny (very sharp) cupule 5–11 cm in diameter, also called "bur" or "burr". The burrs are often paired or clustered on the branch and contain one to seven nuts according to the different species, varieties, and cultivars. Around the time the fruit reach maturity, the burrs turn yellow-brown and split open in two or four sections. They can remain on the tree longer than they hold the fruit, but more often achieve complete opening and release the fruit only after having fallen on the ground; opening is partly due to soil humidity.

The chestnut fruit has a pointed end with a small tuft at its tip (called "flame" in Italian), and, at the other end, a hilum–a pale brown attachment scar. In many cultivars, the fruit is flattened on one or two sides. It has two skins. The first one is a hard, shiny, brown outer hull or husk, called the pericarpus; the industry calls this the "peel". Underneath the pericarpus is another, thinner skin, called the pellicle or episperm. The pellicle closely adheres to the seed itself, following the grooves usually present at the surface of the fruit. These grooves are of variable sizes and depths according to the species and cultivar.

The fruit inside these shows a germ with two cotyledons making up the creamy-white flesh throughout. Some cultivars have consistently only one embryo per fruit (nut) or have only one large fruit per burr, well-rounded (no flat face). The name of cultivars with these characteristics may start with "marron", for example marron de Lyon in France, or Marrone di Mugello in Italy.

Chestnut fruit may not exhibit epigeal dormancy. It may germinate right upon falling to the ground in the autumn, with the roots emerging from the seed right away and the leaves and stem the following spring. The germ can lose viability soon after ripening and under drying conditions.

The superior fruiting cultivars among European chestnuts have good size, sweet taste, and easily removed pellicles (inner skins). American chestnuts are usually very small (around 5 g), but sweet-tasting with easy-to-remove pellicles. Some Japanese cultivars have very large nuts (around 40 g), with typically difficult-to-remove pellicles. Chinese chestnut pellicles are usually easy to remove, and their sizes vary greatly according to the cultivars, although usually smaller than the Japanese chestnut.

=== Similar species ===
The unrelated horse-chestnuts (genus Aesculus) are not true chestnuts, but are named for producing nuts of slightly similar appearance that are mildly poisonous to humans. True chestnuts should also not be confused with water chestnuts, which are tubers of an aquatic herbaceous plant in the sedge family Cyperaceae. Other species sometimes mistaken for chestnut trees are the chestnut oak (Quercus prinus) and the American beech (Fagus grandifolia), both of which are also in the family Fagaceae. Brazil nuts, called "Brasil chestnuts" (castañas de Brasil in Spanish) or "chestnuts from Pará" (castanha-do-Pará in Portuguese,) are also unrelated.

== Taxonomy ==
=== Species ===
Chestnuts belong to the family Fagaceae, which also includes oaks and beeches. The four main species groups are commonly known as American, European, Chinese, and Japanese chestnuts.

The taxonomy of the American chestnut is not completely resolved, particularly between the chinkapins (Castanea ozarkensis and Castanea pumila), which are sometimes considered to be the same species. Genetics have indicated the California native golden chinkapin (Chrysolepis chrysophylla) is worthy of inclusion in a different genus along with a species from Coastal China. There is also another chestnut, Castanea alabamensis, which may be a valid species.

| Subgenus | Image | Scientific name | Common name | Distribution |
|---|---|---|---|---|
| American chestnuts | | Castanea dentata | American chestnut | Eastern North America |
| American chestnuts | | Castanea pumila | American or Allegheny chinkapin, also known as "dwarf chestnut" | Southern and eastern United States |
| American chestnuts | | Castanea ozarkensis | Ozark chinkapin | Southeastern and Midwestern United States |
| Asian chestnuts | | Castanea mollissima | Chinese chestnut | China, Vietnam, India, and North Korea |
| Asian chestnuts | | Castanea henryi | Chinese chinkapin, also called Henry's chestnut | China |
| Asian chestnuts | | Castanea seguinii | Seguin's chestnut | China |
| Asian chestnuts | | Castanea crenata | Japanese chestnut, Korean chestnut | Korean Peninsula and Japan |
| European chestnuts | | Castanea sativa | sweet chestnut; also called "Spanish chestnut" in the US | Parts of Southern Europe, the Caucasus, Western Asia and Asia Minor |

=== Etymology ===
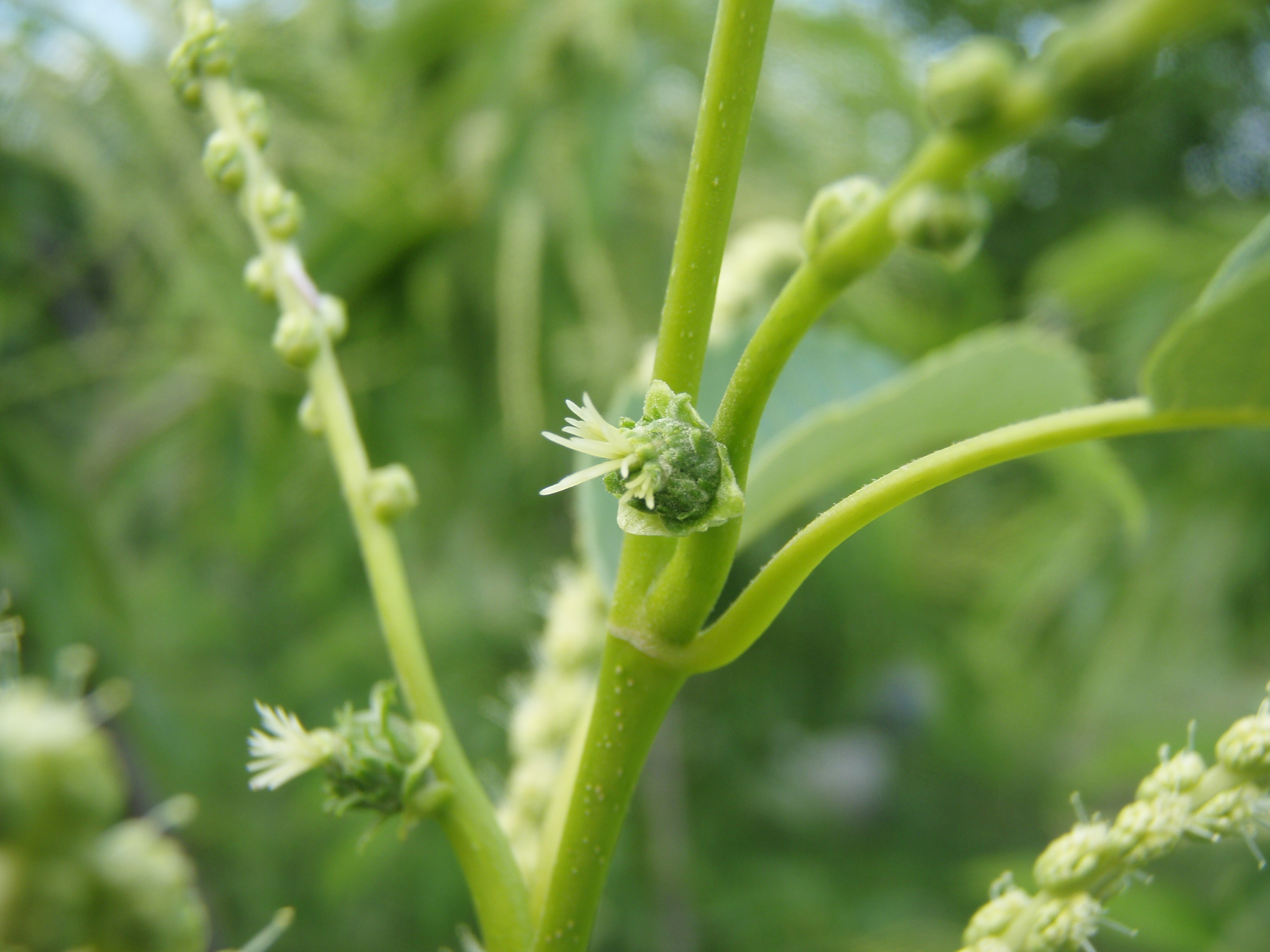
Female chestnut flowers

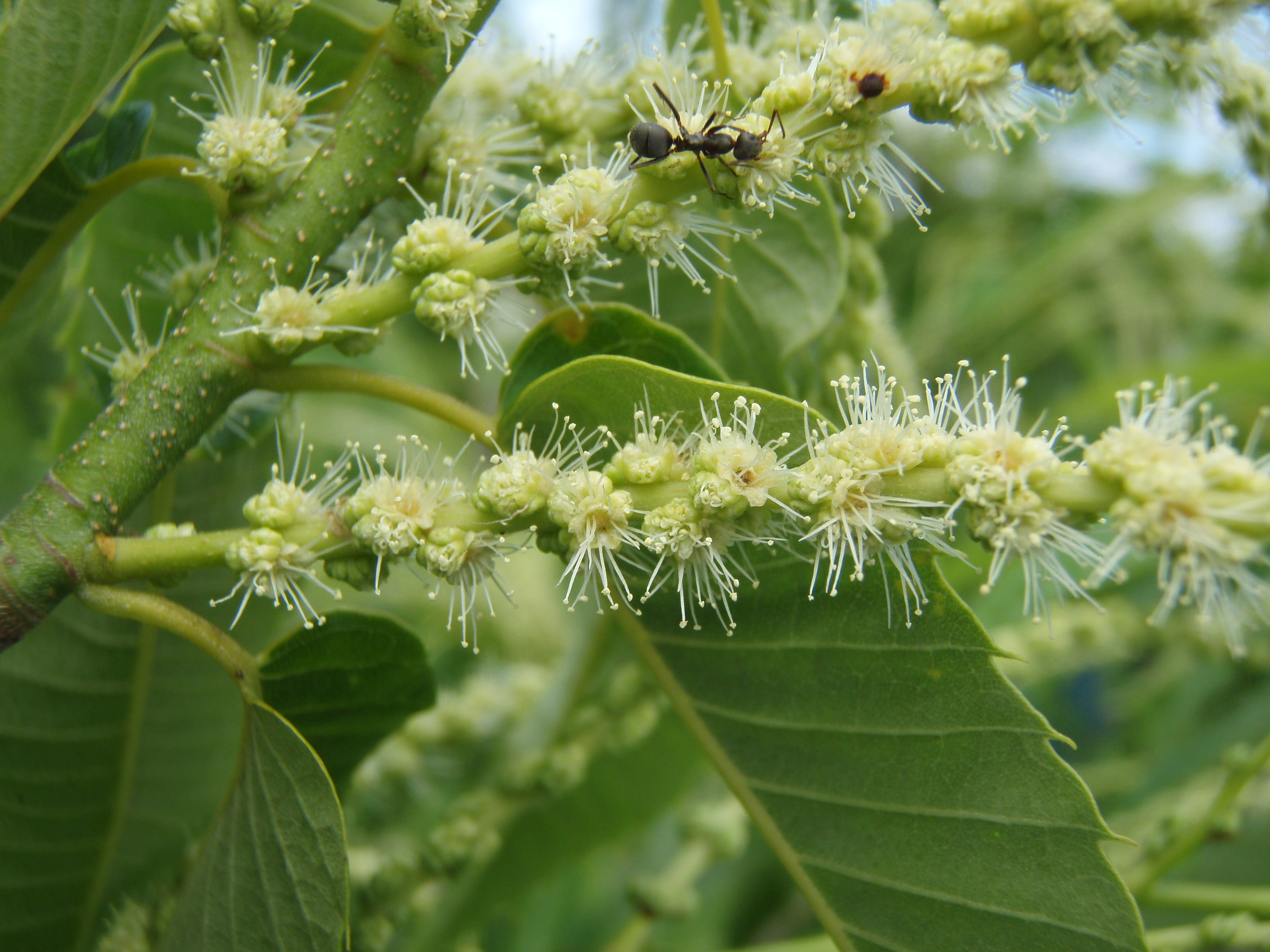
Male chestnut flowers

The name "chestnut" is derived from an earlier English term "chesten nut", which descends from the Old French word chastain (Modern French, châtaigne). The French word in turn derives from Latin Castanea (also the scientific name of the tree), which traces to the Ancient Greek word κάστανον (sweet chestnut). A possible source of the Greek word is the ancient town of Casthanaea in Magnesia. Its location is at the modern village of Keramidi. The town probably took its name, though, from the trees growing around it. In the Mediterranean climate zone, chestnut trees are rarer in Greece because the chalky soil is not conducive to the tree's growth. Kastania is located on one of the relatively few sedimentary or siliceous outcrops. They grow so abundantly there that their presence would have determined the place's name. Still others take the name as coming from the Greek name of Sardis glans (Sardis acorn) – Sardis being the capital of Lydia, Asia Minor, from where the fruit had spread.

The name is cited twice in the King James Version of the Bible. In one instance, Jacob puts peeled twigs in the water troughs to promote healthy offspring of his livestock. Although it may indicate another tree, it indicates the fruit was a local staple food in the early 17th century.

These synonyms are or have been in use: Fagus castanea (used by Linnaeus in first edition of Species Plantarum, 1753), Sardian nut, Jupiter's nut, husked nut, and Spanish chestnut (U.S.).

== Ecology ==
The tree is noted for attracting wildlife. The nuts are an important food for jays, pigeons, wild boar, deer, and squirrels. American and Chinese chinquapins (C. pumila and C. henryi) have very small nuts that are an important source of food for wildlife.

== Cultivation ==
=== History ===
==== Europe and the Near East ====
It has been a staple food in southern Europe, Turkey, and southwestern and eastern Asia for millennia, largely replacing cereals where these would not grow well, if at all, in mountainous Mediterranean areas. Evidence of its cultivation by humans is found since around 2000 BC. Alexander the Great and the Romans planted chestnut trees across Europe while on their various campaigns. A Greek army is said to have survived their retreat from Asia Minor in 401–399 BC thanks to their stores of chestnuts. Ancient Greeks, such as Dioscorides and Galen, wrote of chestnuts to comment on their medicinal properties, and of the flatulence induced by eating too much of it. To the early Christians, chestnuts symbolized chastity. Until the introduction of the potato, whole forest-dwelling communities which had scarce access to wheat flour relied on chestnuts as their main source of carbohydrates. In some parts of Italy, a cake made of chestnuts is used as a substitute for potatoes. In 1583, Charles Estienne and Jean Liébault wrote, "an infinity of people live on nothing else but (the chestnut)". In 1802, an Italian agronomist said of Tuscany that "the fruit of the chestnut tree is practically the sole subsistence of our highlanders", while in 1879 it was said that it almost exclusively fed whole populations for half the year, as "a temporary but complete substitution for cereals".

The Hundred Horse Chestnut in the chestnut forests on Mount Etna is the oldest living chestnut tree and is said to be even larger. Chestnut trees particularly flourish in the Mediterranean basin. In 1584, the governor of Genoa, which dominated Corsica, ordered all the farmers and landowners to plant four trees yearly, among which was a chestnut tree, plus olive, fig and mulberry trees. Many communities owe their origin and former richness to the ensuing chestnut woods. In France, the marron glacé, a candied chestnut involving 16 different processes in a typically French cooking style, is always served at Christmas and New Year's time. In Modena, Italy, they are soaked in wine before roasting and serving, and are also traditionally eaten on Saint Simon's Day in Tuscany. In the Romagna region, roasted chestnuts are often served with a traditional wine, the Cagnina di Romagna. It is traditional to eat roasted chestnuts in Portugal on St. Martin's Day.

Their popularity declined during the last few centuries, partly due to their reputation of "food for poor people". Many people did not want to take chestnut bread as "bread" because chestnut flour does not rise. Some slandered chestnut products in such words as the bread which "gives a sallow complexion" written in 1770, or in 1841 "this kind of mortar which is called a soup". The last decades' worldwide renewal may have profited from the huge reforestation efforts started in the 1930s in the United States to establish cultivars of C. sativa which may be resistant to chestnut blight, as well as to relieve the strain on cereal supplies.

The main region in Italy for chestnut production is the Mugello region; in 1996, the European Community granted the fruit Protected Geographic Indication (equivalent to the French Appellation d'Origine Contrôlée) status to the Mugello sweet chestnut. It is markedly sweet, peels easily, is not excessively floury or astringent, and has notes of vanilla, hazelnut, and, more subtly, fresh bread. It has no unpleasant aroma, such as yeast, fungus, mould, or paper, which sometimes occur with other chestnuts. The main regions in France for chestnut production are the départements of Ardèche, Var (Eastern Provence), Cévennes (Gard and Lozère départements) and the Lyon region. France annually produces over 1,000 tonnes, but still imports about 8,000 tonnes, mainly from Italy.

In Portugal's archipelago of Madeira, chestnut liquor is a traditional beverage, and it is gaining popularity with the tourists and in continental Portugal.

In Britain, pre-historic pollen records show that the species is an introduced, and not a native, tree. It is associated with sites of Roman-era occupation, but it was already established by that time. Boundary records compiled in the reign of King John showed the famous Tortworth Chestnut in South Gloucestershire was already a landmark; it was known by the name of "Great Chestnut of Tortworth" in the days of Stephen. This tree measured over 15 m (50 ft) in circumference at 1.5 m (5 ft) from the ground in 1720.

==== Asia ====
Always served as part of the New Year's menu in Japan, chestnuts represent both success and hard times—mastery and strength. The Japanese chestnut (kuri) was in cultivation before rice and the Chinese chestnut (C. mollissima) possibly for 2,000 to 6,000 years.

During British colonial rule in the mid-1700s to 1947, the sweet chestnut, C. sativa, was widely introduced in the temperate parts of the Indian subcontinent, mainly in the lower to middle Himalayas. They are widely found in British-founded hill stations in northern India, and to a lesser extent in Bhutan and Nepal. They are mainly used as an ornamental tree and are found in almost all British-founded botanical gardens and official governmental compounds (such as larger official residences) in temperate parts of the Indian subcontinent.

China has about 300 chestnut cultivars. The 'Dandong' chestnut (belonging to the Japanese chestnut C. crenata) is a major cultivar in Liaoning Province.

In South Korea, roasted chestnuts (gunbam) are a popular winter snack, and serve as a symbol of abundance in ancestral rituals. Roasted chestnuts are also included in folk songs of Korea, which include "Gunbam Taryeong", a song that celebrates chestnuts, as well as "Jeongseokga", a song from the Goryeo period. Gongju, one of Baekje's former capitals, is renowned for its chestnuts, with an annual chestnut festival that takes place in the winter. In the Samgukji (Records Of The Three Kingdoms), a book that was compiled during the Jin dynasty about the Three Kingdoms, chestnuts are used in the description of Mahan, the former land of Baekje.

In the Philippines, the endemic talakatak or Philippine chestnut (Castanopsis philippinensis) is not cultivated commercially, though its nuts are harvested from the wild and consumed locally. Imported chestnuts (known as kastanyas in Tagalog, from Spanish castañas) are traditionally sold as street food in the Philippines during the Christmas season.

==== North America ====
Native Americans were eating the American chestnut species, mainly C. dentata and some others, long before European immigrants introduced their stock to America, and before the arrival of chestnut blight. In some places, such as the Appalachian Mountains, one-quarter of hardwoods were chestnuts. Mature trees often grew straight and branch-free for 50 ft (15 m), up to 100 ft, averaging up to 5 ft in diameter. For three centuries, most barns and homes east of the Mississippi River were made from it. In 1911, the food book The Grocer's Encyclopedia noted that a cannery in Holland included in its "vegetables-and-meat" ready-cooked combinations, a "chestnuts and sausages" casserole beside the more classic "beef and onions" and "green peas and veal". This celebrated the chestnut culture that would bring whole villages out in the woods for three weeks each autumn (and keep them busy all winter), and deplored the lack of food diversity in the United States's shop shelves.

Soon after that, however, the American chestnuts were nearly wiped out by chestnut blight. The discovery of the blight fungus on some Asian chestnut trees planted on Long Island, New York, was made public in 1904. Within 40 years, the nearly four billion-strong American chestnut population in North America was devastated; only a few clumps of trees remained in Michigan, Wisconsin, California, and the Pacific Northwest. Due to disease, American chestnut wood almost disappeared from the market for decades, although quantities can still be obtained as reclaimed lumber. Today, they only survive as single trees separated from any others (very rare), and as living stumps, or "stools", with only a few growing enough shoots to produce seeds shortly before dying. This is just enough to preserve the genetic material used to engineer an American chestnut tree with the minimal necessary genetic input from any of the disease-immune Asiatic species. Efforts started in the 1930s are still ongoing to repopulate the country with these trees, in Massachusetts and many places elsewhere in the United States. In the 1970s, geneticist Charles Burnham began back-breeding Asian chestnut into American chestnut populations to confer blight resistance with the minimum difference in genes.

In the 1950s, the Dunstan chestnut was developed in Greensboro, N.C., and constitutes the majority of blight-free chestnuts produced in the United States annually. It is so named because it was developed by Robert T. Dunstan

Today, the demand for the nut outstrips supply. The United States imported 4,056 tonnes of European in-shell chestnuts worth $10 million in 2007. The U.S. chestnut industry is in its infancy, producing less than 1% of total world production. Since the mid-20th century, most of the US imports are from Southern Italy, with the large, meaty, and richly flavoured Sicilian chestnuts being considered among the best quality for bulk sale and supermarket retail. Some imports come from Portugal and France. The next two largest sources of imports are China and South Korea. The French cultivars of marrons are highly favoured and sold at high prices in gourmet shops. As of 2024, the United States imports 7.5 million pounds of non-organic chestnuts per year.

A study of the sector in 2005 found that U.S. producers are mainly part-timers diversifying an existing agricultural business, or hobbyists. Another recent study indicates that investment in a new plantation takes 13 years to break even, at least within the current Australian market. Starting a small-scale operation requires a relatively low initial investment; this is a factor in the small size of the present production operations, with half of them being between 3 and 10 acres (12,000 and 40,000 m^{2}). Another determining factor in the small productivity of the sector is that most orchards have been created less than 10 years ago, so have young trees which are as now barely entering commercial production. Assuming a 10 kg (22 lb) yield for a 10-year-old tree is a reliable conservative estimate, though some exceptional specimens of that age have yielded 100 kg (220 lb). So, most producers earn less than $5,000 per year, with a third of them not having sold anything so far.

Moreover, the plantings have so far been mostly of Chinese species, but the products are not readily available. The American Chestnut Foundation in collaboration with many partners (SUNY ESF, the American Chestnut Cooperators' Foundation and many others from education, research, and industry sectors contributing to the program) are in the last stages of developing a variety that is as close as possible to the American chestnut, while having incorporated the blight-resistant gene of the Asiatic species. Considering the additional advantage that chestnut trees can be easily grown organically, and assuming the development of brands in the market and everything else being equal, home-grown products would reach higher prices than imports, the high volume of which indicates a market with expanding prospects. As of 2008, the price for chestnuts sold fresh in the shell ranges from $1.50/lb ($3.30/kg) wholesale to about $5/lb ($11/kg) retail, depending mainly on the size.

==== Australia and New Zealand ====
The Australian gold rush of the 1850s and 1860s led to the first recorded plantings of European chestnut trees, brought from Europe by settlers. Along the years, most chestnut tree plantations were C. sativa stock, which is still the dominant species. Some of these remain today. Some trees in northern Victoria are around 120 years old and up to 60 m tall. Chestnuts grow well in southwest Western Australia, which has cold winters and warm to hot summers. As of 2008, the country has nearly 350 growers, annually producing around 1,200 tonnes of chestnuts, of which 80% come from northeast Victoria. The produce is mostly sold to the domestic fresh fruit market. Chestnuts are slowly gaining popularity in Australia. A considerable increase in production is expected in the next 10 years, due to the increase in commercial plantings during the last 15 to 25 years. By far, the most common species in Australia is the European chestnut, but small numbers of the other species, as well as some hybrids, have been planted. The Japanese chestnut (C. crenata) does well in wet and humid weather and in hot summers (about 30 °C); and was introduced to New Zealand in the early 1900s, more so in the upper North Island region.

=== Cultivation ecology ===
==== Climate and seasonal germination cycle ====
Chestnuts produce a better crop when subjected to chill temperatures during the dormant period. Frosts and snowfalls are beneficial rather than harmful to the trees. The dormant plant is very cold-hardy in Britain, to the Royal Horticultural Society's H6 hardiness rating, to -20 °C. and grows well throughout the country, north to northern Scotland. The young growth in spring, even on mature plants, however, is frost-tender; bud-burst is later than most other fruit trees, so late frosts can be damaging to young buds.

Trees can be found at altitudes between 200 and 1000 m above sea level; some mention between 300 and 759 m altitude, while the famous Hundred Horse Chestnut on Mount Etna stands at 1200 metres. They can tolerate maritime exposure, although growth is reduced.

Seeds germinate in late winter or early spring, but the life length is short. If kept moist, they can be stored in a cool place for a few months, but must be checked regularly for signs of germination. Low temperature prolongs dormancy. Sowing them as soon as ripe is better, either in cold frames or seedbeds outdoors, where they can be left in situ for one to two years before being planted in their permanent positions, or in pots, where the plants can be put out into their permanent positions in summer or autumn. They must be protected from the cold in their first winter, and also from mice and squirrels.

Chestnuts are considered self-sterile, so at least two trees are needed for pollination.

==== Soil requirements ====
Castanea grows best in a soil with good drainage and adequate moisture. The tree prefers sloping, deep soils; it does not like shallow or heavy soils with impermeable, clay subsoils. The Chinese chestnut prefers a fertile, well-drained soil, but it grows well in fairly dry, rocky, or poor soils.

Although Castanea can grow in very acidic soil, and while these soils are reasonably well tolerated, the preferred range is from pH 5.5-6.0. It does not grow well on alkaline soils, such as chalk, but thrives on soils such as those derived from granite, sandstone, or schist. On alkaline soils, chestnut trees can be grown by grafting them onto oak rootstocks. Recently cleared land is best avoided to help resist the root rot, Armillaria mellia.

==== Sun exposure ====
Castanea likes a full sun position. An experiment with C. dentata seedlings in Ohio confirmed the need for sun for optimal growth. The butt of the tree is sometimes painted with white paint to protect the tree from sunburn until it has developed enough canopy.

Wide spacing between the trees encourages low, broad crowns with maximum exposure to sunshine to increase fruit production. Where chestnut trees touch, virtually no fruit is produced. Current industrial planting spacings can range from 7 x 7 to 20 x 20 m. The closer plantings, which are more popular, mean quicker increases in short-term production, but heavy pruning or even tree removal is required later.

==== Watering ====
The optimum rainfall for chestnut trees is 800 mm (31 in) or more, ideally in even distribution throughout the year. Mulching during summer is recommended. Rainfall below 700 mm (28 in) per year needs be complemented with, for example, a drip irrigation system. This should water the soil at the outer half of the circle formed by the drip line to encourage root growth.

Independently from annual rainfall, watering young trees is recommended at least during summer and early autumn. Once established, they resist droughts well.

==== Preservation ====
In addition to being consumed fresh, chestnuts can also be canned, pureed, or preserved in sugar or syrup (marrons glacés). Shelled and cooked nuts should be covered, refrigerated, and used within 3–4 days. Cooked chestnuts, either whole, chopped, or pureed, may be frozen in an airtight container and held up to 9 months. Because of their high water content, transpiration rates, and consequent loss weight, the nuts react as fresh fruit (not as nuts). They should be kept cool at all times, including in shops when on display for sale. To preserve their freshness for a few months with no artificial refrigeration, the chestnuts can be soaked in cold water for about 20 hours immediately after harvest, after which they are dried in the shade, then layered in dry sand. Chestnuts behave similarly to seeds in that they produce very little ethylene, and their respiration rate is low, varying between 5 and 20 mg/(kg·h) depending on the temperature.

==== Pests ====
===== Mammals and birds =====
- Grey squirrels strip bark from when the tree is about eight years old and onward through the life of the tree.
- Rabbits and wallabies can do great damage to young trees, which need guarding by some fence or by wrapping the tree trunk in sisal or other appropriate material. Deer and kangaroos can also be troublesome.
- Cattle and horses may require temporary fencing to prevent them from damaging fallen chestnuts at harvest time.
- The sulphur-crested cockatoo can damage branches up to 10 mm in diameter by carrying out "beak maintenance" on young trees.
- Rosellas can be troublesome at harvest time.
- Squirrels, mice, and other creatures often eat the chestnut seed after it has sprouted. This is countered by propagating the tree indoors and removing the chestnut seed from the stem before planting in the open.

===== Insects =====
- Dryocosmus kuriphilus, the oriental chestnut gall wasp, is native to China, but is an invasive pest elsewhere. It attacks and destroys the chestnut fruit. It is considered the world's worst pest of chestnuts.
- The larvae of the polyfag moth (Phytomyza horticola) species are among those that do most damage to shoots and foliage.
- The most frequently occurring pests are the winter moth (Operophtera brumata) and the mottled umber moth (Erannis defoliaria).
- The oak roller weevil (Attelabus nitens) causes relatively less damage by rolling up the leaves into a barrel shape to shelter its eggs and developing larvae. The insects swarm from the end of April to mid-June, and damage the tree's flower buds during their feeding season.
- The larvae of the oak-leaf-mining moth, also called the tischerid moth (Tischeria ekebladella), digs white, see-through mines in chestnut leaves. It lays its eggs in the leaves between May and June. The larvae cause white spots in the leaves by chewing them from the inside.
- The oak aphid (Myzocallis castanicola) sucks on the apex of young shoots and leaves. Native to Europe and North America, it is, for example, active in Hungary. Leaves do not roll up, but their feeding delays the growth of shoots and damages young graft-shoot hosts. Commercial plantations and nurseries spray pesticides during the shoots' growth period to fight the damage. The chestnut mosaic virus is probably transmitted by M. castanicola aphids.
- The chestnut weevil (Curculio elephas) most often damages the fruit. In Hungary, it swarms in chestnut orchards around August 20, particularly strongly around noon and in sunny weather. The eggs are laid into the cupules or around the peduncle joints. The larvae feed on the nuts and leave only nutchips and excrement within. While the chestnuts ripen, the larvae retreat into the ground after having chewed their way out of the nuts. The following July, they turn into pupae.
  The larvae of the chestnut weevil can only chew their way out of a fallen nut, so breeding occurs mostly where chestnuts lie on the ground for a sufficient length of time, or where the trees produce many small fruit which remain behind at the harvest. Timing the harvests to pick up the chestnuts as soon as they fall reduces the numbers of the overwintering larvae. Regular soil work is also unfavourable to its life habits. Small grafts are sprayed with chemicals. A warm, aerosol-based protection has been developed for older trees, by Sifter and Bürgés in 1971. Planting chestnut orchards beside turkey oak forests is not advised, because both trees are susceptible to the chestnut weevil (which also uses the turkey oak acorn to develop), and the turkey oak trees can pass it on to the chestnut trees.
- In Hungary, the most common moth threatening chestnut trees is the acorn moth (Laspeyreisa splendana) and its subspecies. Its greyish-yellow larvae cause similar damage to that of the chestnut weevil, but they spin characteristic webs among the nutchips and larval excrement. This moth causes about 5–41% of the damage that occurs in western Hungary's plantations. Plantations need regular protection against these moths, the occurrence of which does not decrease.
- In New Zealand, the grass grub beetle eats the soft, new-season foliage. They can entirely strip a young tree in the late spring, when they fly at dusk, often in huge numbers.

==== Diseases ====
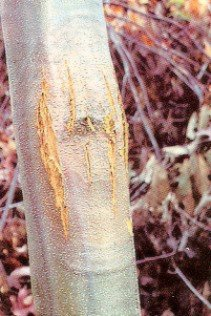
Chestnut blight

- Chestnut blight fungus (Cryphonectria parasitica) (formerly Endothia parasitica) affects chestnut trees. The Eastern Asian species have coevolved with this disease and are moderately to very resistant to it, while the European and North American species, not having been exposed to it in the past, have little or no resistance. Early in the 20th century, chestnut blight destroyed about four billion American chestnut trees, and reduced the most important tree throughout the East Coast to an insignificant presence. The American chinkapins are also very susceptible to chestnut blight. The European and West Asian chestnuts are susceptible, but less so than the American species. The resistant species (particularly Japanese and Chinese chestnut, but also Seguin's chestnut and Henry's chestnut) have been used in breeding programs in the U.S. to create hybrids with the American chestnut that are also disease-resistant.
  The bark miner Spulerina simploniella (Lepidoptera: Gracillariidae) was found in intensively managed chestnut coppices in Greece, but not in orchards. The larvae (and the rain) may be agents in the spread of the disease. They mine under the thin periderm of young trees up to 10 years old, while the stem bark is still smooth. Rain during the pupation period (around the last week of May and first two weeks of June), and the actions of the larvae, may collude for conidiospores to come into contact with the freshly exposed phloem, thus causing cankers.
- Ink disease also appears in a number of other plants. The disease attacks the phloem tissue and the cambium of the roots and root collars about 10–20 cm above ground. Wet rot settles in as a result. It was named after the ink-black colour of the tannic acid becoming (oxidized) after seeping out, but that symptom is not a characteristic of only that disease. The same ink-black colour can appear following other types of decays and mechanical injuries that make liquids seep through; these liquids can also oxidize after contact with air. Moreover, with some phytophthoric diseases, no tannic acid is generated. With the ink disease, the leaves turn yellow and later fall off; the fruit remain small, and the nuts prematurely drop out of the burrs. These dry and remain on the trees throughout winter. In acute cases, root decay makes the trees dry out and wither away. It is caused by Phytophthora cambivora and Phytophthora cinnamomi.
- Phytophthora disease is the longest-known chestnut tree disease leading to tree death. Of the two main pathogens for this disease, the one in European chestnuts is known since 1971 to be Phytophthora cambivora. Phytophthora cinnamomi was discovered in chestnut trees in the United States in 1932. Both trigger similar symptoms. Since then, it has also been shown to occur in most European chestnut-growing countries. Differentiating between the two pathogens is difficult. Chemicals seem of little effectiveness. Many countries impose strict prophylactic rules to prevent the spread of the disease.
- Melanconis modonia can infect trees through injuries and induce "bark death". It was first reported in Hungary by Hausz in 1972. The damage is of little consequence in older or stronger trees, but it affects sapling graftings in nurseries. Coryneum perniciosum, one of the two conidium-like side forms of this fungus, occurs on all decayed, ligneous parts of a chestnut tree. The symptoms of infection on young, smooth trunks is similar to that of the chestnut blight fungus Cryphonectria. For this reason, it has persistently been wrongly thought of as the pathogen for ink disease. With Melanconis, the bark sinks in and takes on brownish-red tones, with black, lentil-like multicell conidium bodies and black cone-like stromata breaking through the bark. Unlike with Cryphonectria, though, no orange-coloured fruiting bodies are seen. Prevention primarily includes keeping trees in good shape; some further protections against Cryphonectria also help prevent bark death caused by Melanconis.
- Chestnut mosaic virus is probably transmitted by the oak aphid Myzocallis castanicola.
- Root rot is caused by the honey fungus Armillaria mellia. When planting Castanea, recently cleared land is best avoided to help resist this fungus. The disease is more prevalent on heavier and poorly drained soil types.

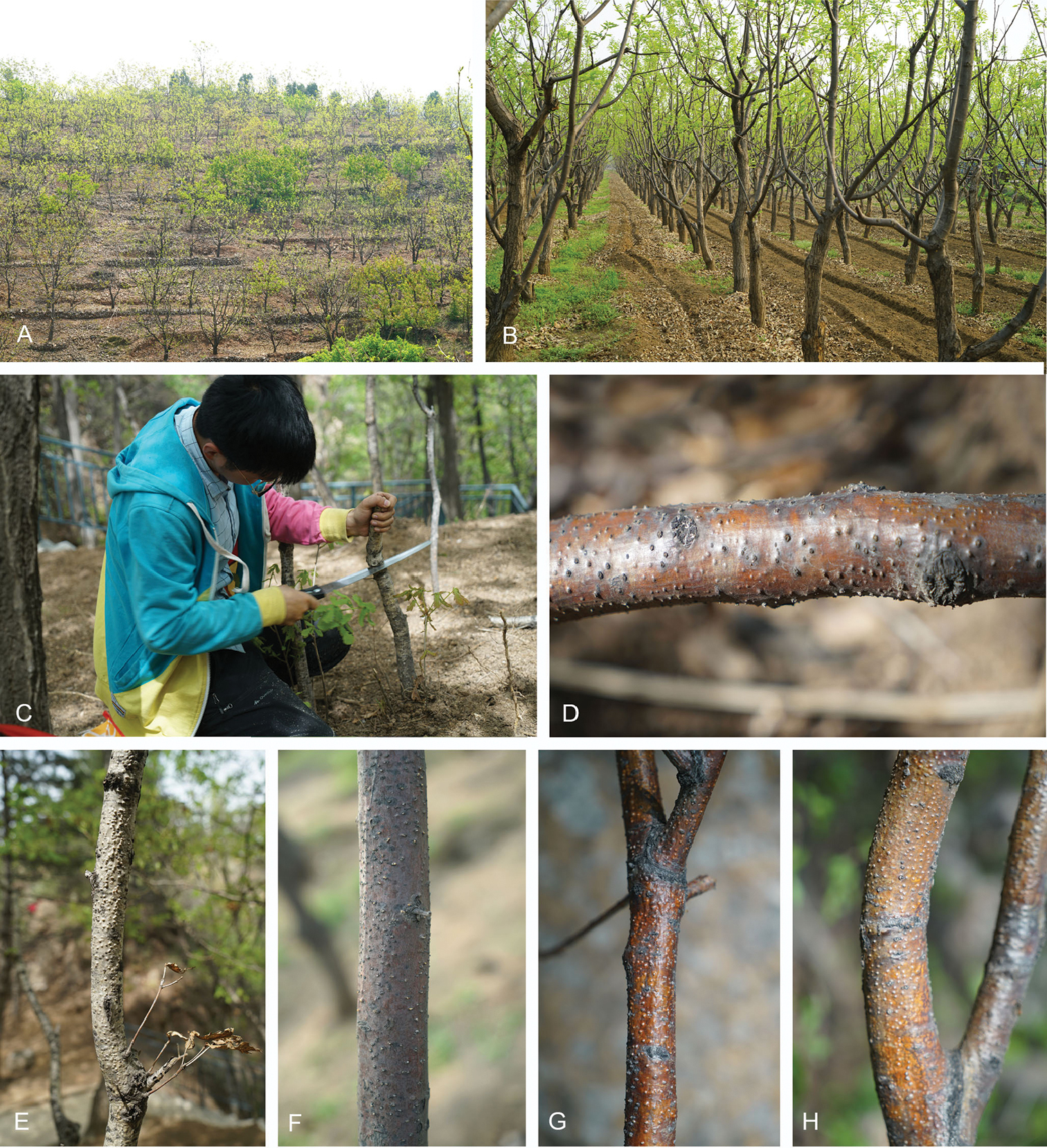
Chestnut canker

- Leaf spot is the most common disease for chestnut trees (Mycosphaerella maculiformis). It is known as cylindrosporium leaf spot disease, after its summer conidium form Cylindrosporium castaneae. The pathogens spend the winter in the white spots of the fallen leaves. At spring time, it reinfects the new leaves. In or near June, tiny white spots on the leaves appear, which grow and turn brown over time. At the end of the summer, the spots entirely cover the leaf, which turns yellow. In rainy and humid weather with large temperature fluctuation, the tree loses its leaves. If August is dry and warm, the infected leaves roll up, the arteries twist, and the dead leaves dry on the tree until defoliage. This recurs yearly, though the extent of the damage varies from year to year. Some species are more resistant than others.
- Oak mildew is among several foliage diseases of smaller significance for European chestnut growing. It infects the most trees (Microsphaera alphitoides). Younger trees suffer most; their shoots become short-jointed, growth is delayed, and they develop sensitivity to frostbite. In older trees, the fungus usually infects only the tip of the shoots. The pathogens hibernate in the shoots and infect the leaves from there. The fungus grows on the top of the leaves, with the appearance of a coating only in midsummer. The infected leaves' development slows down or stops, the distance between their vessels shrinks, and the vessels themselves become curly.
- In storage rot, breaking the tuft provides the most common entrance for fungal spores during storage. Ciboria, the most diffuse, turns the flesh black and spongy. Other fungi are known, such as Rhizopus, Fusarium, and Colletotrichum. In chestnuts, Colletotrichum disease symptoms may also be called blossom end rot. Browning of the chestnut burs at the blossom end may be a first sign in August. At harvest time, blackening of pointed end of the chestnut shell and kernel indicates infection. The extent of blackening can vary. It can range from a barely visible black tip of the kernel to the whole nut being black. Parts of the nut kernel with no colour change remain edible.
- Chestnut canker can be caused by fungi of genus Dendrostoma.

=== Coppicing ===
Most chestnut wood production is done by coppice systems, cut on a 12-year rotation to provide small timber which does not split as badly as large logs. In southern England (particularly in Kent), sweet chestnut has traditionally been grown as coppices, being recut every 10 years or so on rotation for poles used for firewood, and fencing (fence posts and chestnut paling).

=== Sustainable forest management ===
An excellent soil-enriching understory in pine forests, sustainable forest management incorporates more mixed plantings of proven efficiency, as opposed to monosylviculture. A study presented in 1997 has evaluated positively the potential increase in productivity with mixed stands and plantations, compared to plots of only one species. The relative yield total values of the mixed plantings steadily increase with time. C. sativa responds well to competitive pressure from Pseudotsuga menziesii, the latter also showing a higher productivity. C. dentata seedlings in Ohio reforestation efforts are best achieved by planting them in places with little or no arboreous land cover, because of the need for light.

Chestnut production – 2024 - in 1,000 tonnes
| China | 1,528.5 |
| Spain | 181.8 |
| Turkey | 74.3 |
| South Korea | 52.2 |
| Italy | 64.3 |
| Portugal | 27.1 |
| World | 2,098 |
Source: FAOSTAT of the United Nations

=== Production ===
In 2020, world production of cultivated chestnuts was 2,322 tonnes, led by China with 75% of the total (table).

Production of chestnuts

Chestnut yield

== Uses ==
=== Nutrition ===
Chestnuts (raw, peeled)
Nutritional value per 100 g (3.5 oz)
- Energy: 820 kJ (200 kcal)
- Carbohydrates: 28 g
- Sugars: 11 g
- Fat: 1.3 g
- Protein: 1.6 g
Vitamins and minerals
| Vitamins | Quantity %DV^{†} |
| Vitamin A equiv. | 0% 1 μg |
| Thiamine (B1) | 12% 0.144 mg |
| Riboflavin (B2) | 1% 0.016 mg |
| Niacin (B3) | 7% 1.102 mg |
| Vitamin B6 | 21% 0.352 mg |
| Folate (B9) | 15% 58 μg |
| Vitamin B12 | 0% 0 μg |
| Vitamin C | 45% 40.2 mg |
| Minerals | Quantity %DV^{†} |
| Calcium | 1% 19 mg |
| Copper | 47% 0.42 mg |
| Iron | 5% 0.94 mg |
| Magnesium | 7% 30 mg |
| Manganese | 15% 0.34 mg |
| Phosphorus | 3% 38 mg |
| Potassium | 16% 484 mg |
| Sodium | 0% 2 mg |
| Zinc | 4% 0.49 mg |
- Other constituents: Quantity
- Water: 60.21 g
- ^{†}Percentages estimated using US recommendations for adults, except for potassium, which is estimated based on expert recommendation from the National Academies.

Chestnuts depart from the norm for culinary nuts, as they have little protein or fat; their calories come chiefly from carbohydrates. Fresh chestnut fruit provide about 820 kJ (200 kcal) of food energy per 100 g of edible parts, which is much lower than walnuts, almonds, other nuts, and dried fruit (about 2,500 kJ or 600 kcal per 100 g).

In some areas, sweet chestnut trees are called "bread trees". When chestnuts are just starting to ripen, the fruit are mostly starch and are firm under finger pressure from the high water content. As the chestnuts ripen, the starch is slowly converted into sugars, and moisture content decreases. Upon pressing the ripe chestnut, a slight "give" can be felt; the hull is not so tense, and space occurs between the flesh of the fruit and it.

Raw chestnuts are 60% water and contain 44 grams of carbohydrates, 2 grams of protein, one gram of fat, supplying 200 calories in a 100-gram reference amount (table). Chestnuts provide some B vitamins and dietary minerals in significant content (table).

Their carbohydrate content compares with that of wheat and rice. Chestnuts have twice as much starch as the potato on an as-is basis. They contain about 8% of various sugars, mainly sucrose, glucose, fructose, and in lesser amounts, stachyose and raffinose, which are fermented in the lower gut, producing gas.

Chestnuts are among the few "nuts" that contain vitamin C, with 48% of the Daily Value in a 100-gram serving (table). The amount of vitamin C decreases by roughly 40% upon heating (typically, the vitamin is decreased or destroyed in heated foods). Fresh chestnuts contain about 52% water by weight, which evaporates relatively quickly during storage. They can lose as much as 1% of weight in one day at 20 °C (68 °F) and 70% relative humidity.

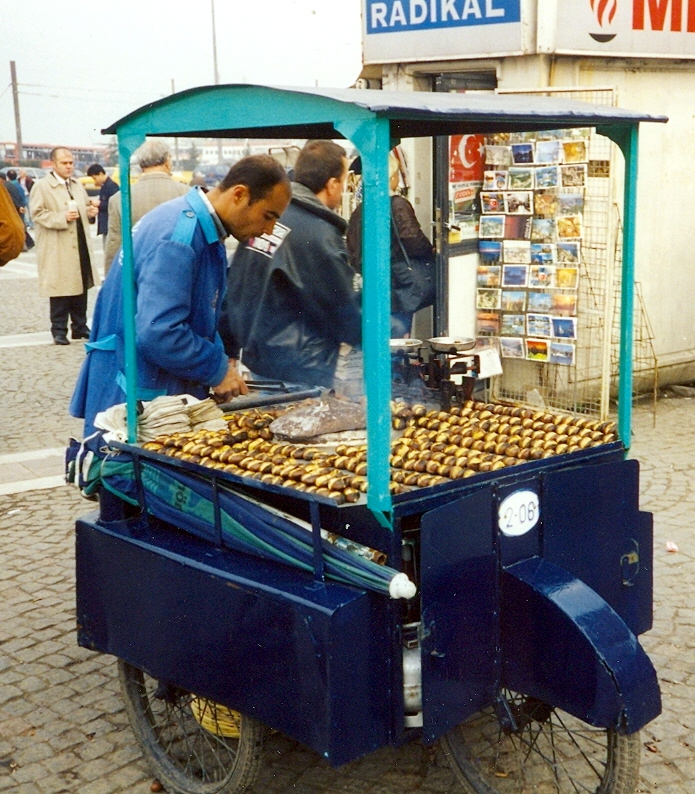
A kestaneci or chestnut vendor in Istanbul

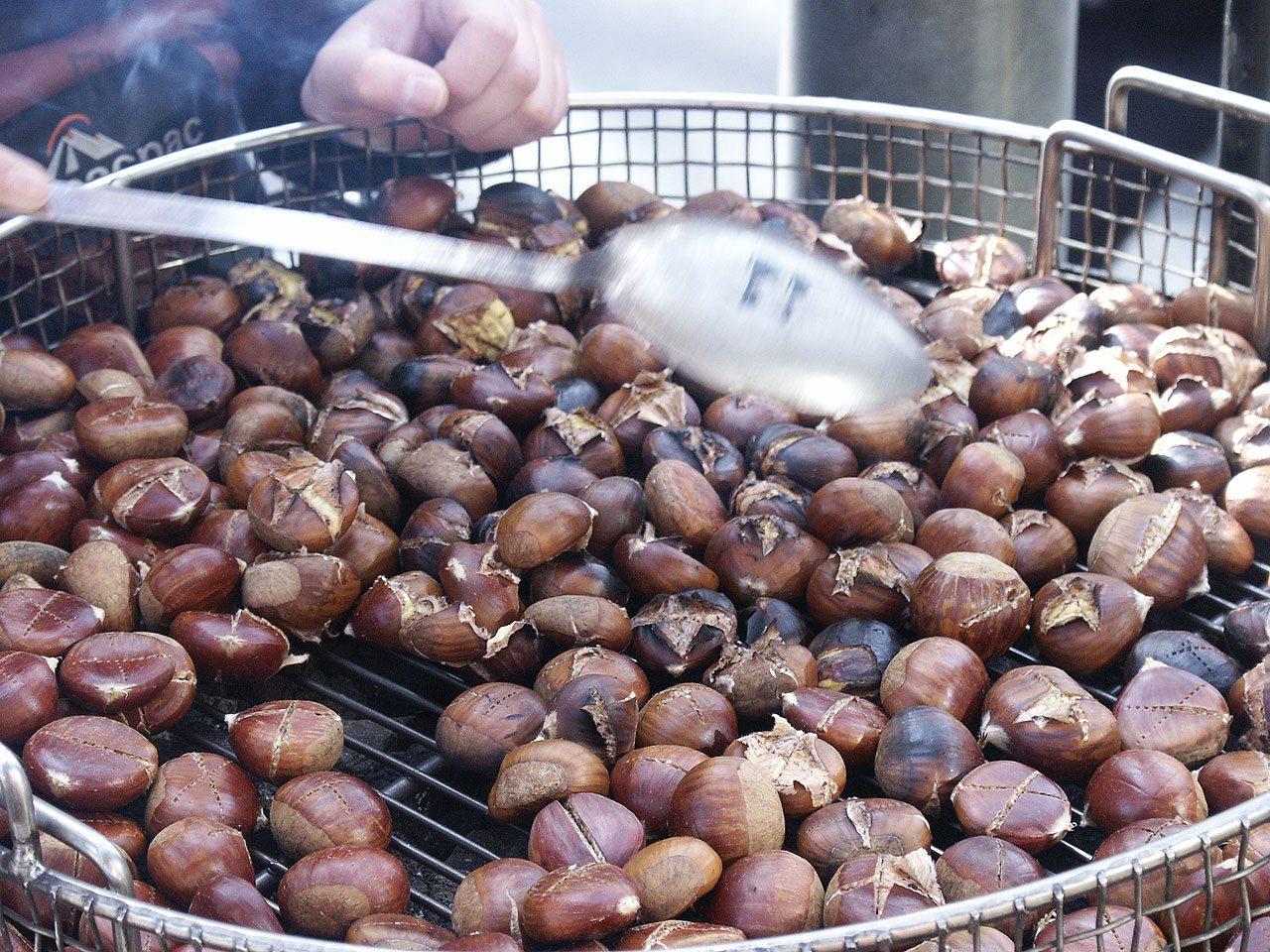
Roasted chestnuts in Melbourne, Australia

=== Culinary ===
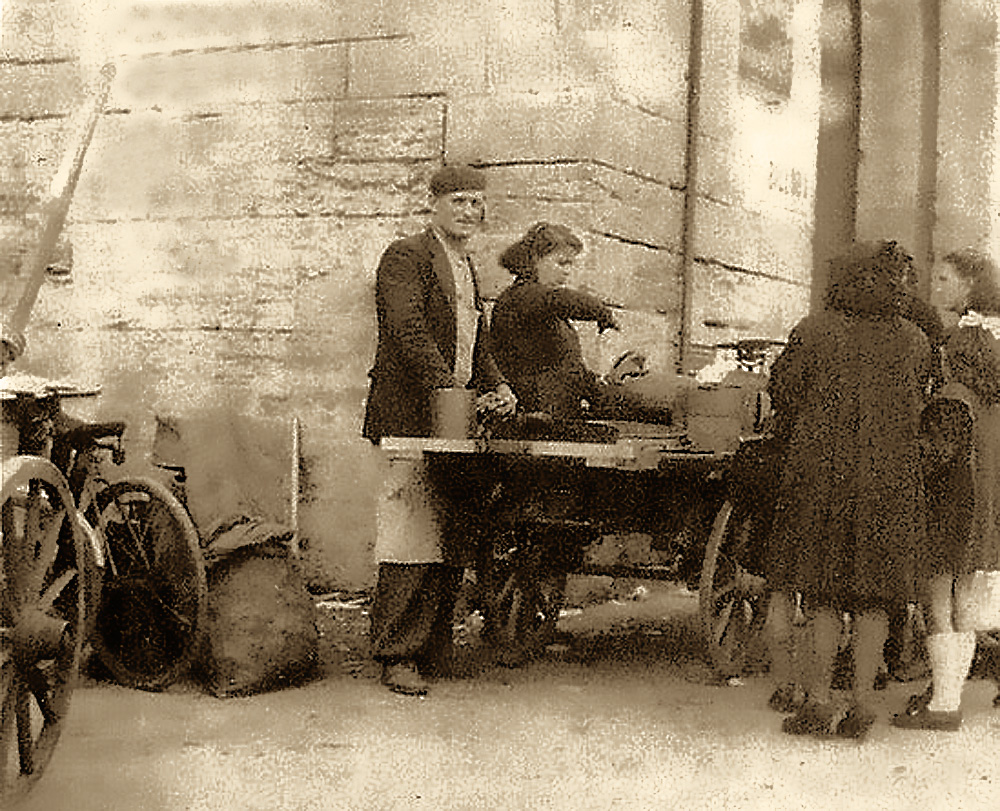
A hot chestnut seller in Avignon, 1936

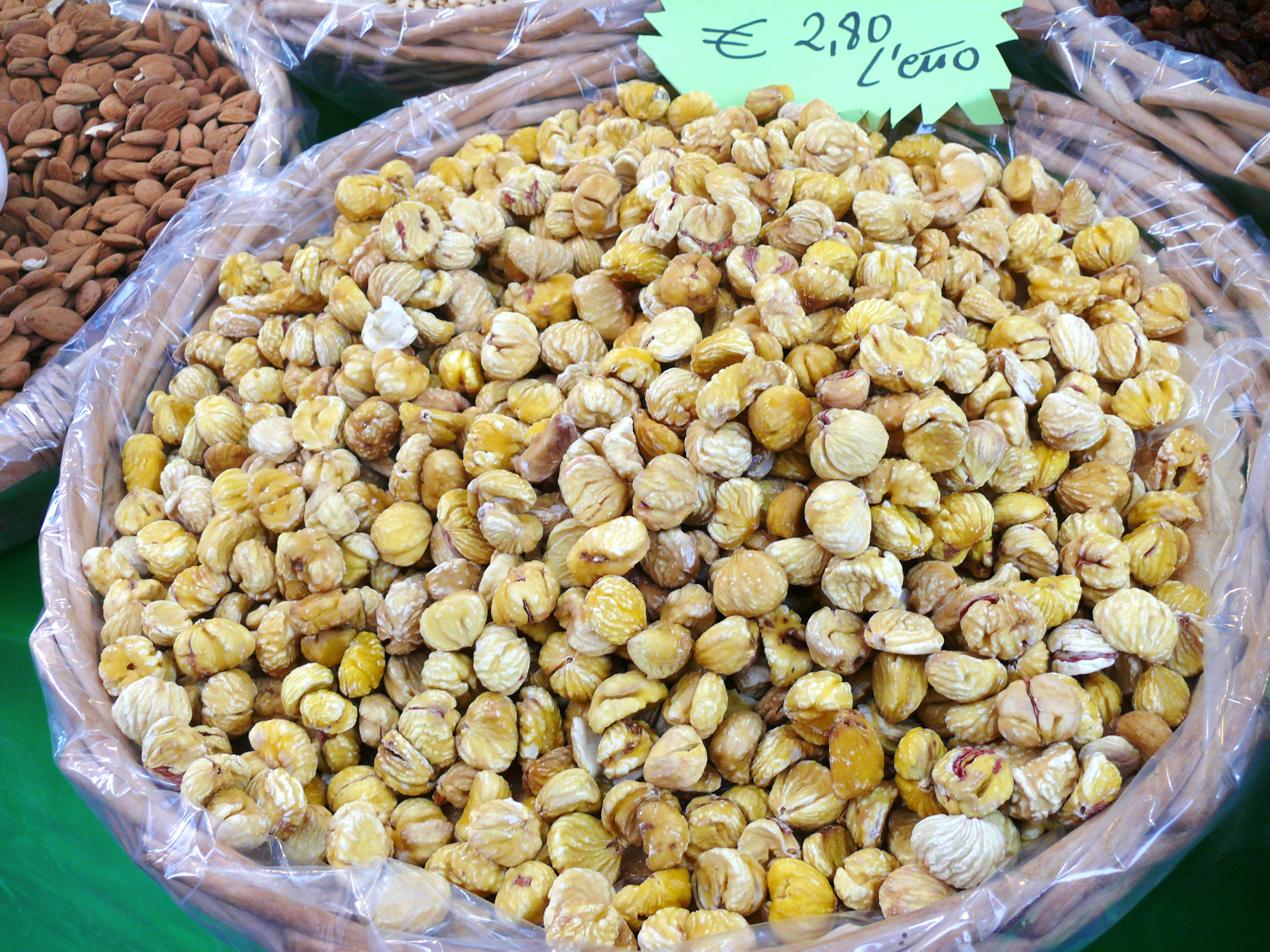
Dried chestnut in the South of Italy

The fruit can be peeled and eaten raw, but it can be somewhat astringent, especially if the pellicle is not removed.

Another method of eating the fruit involves roasting, which does not require peeling. Roasting requires scoring the fruit beforehand to prevent explosion of the fruit due to expansion. Once cooked, its texture is slightly similar to that of a baked potato, with a delicate, sweet, and nutty flavour. This method of preparation is popular in many countries, where the scored chestnuts may be cooked mixed with a little sugar.

Chestnuts can be dried and milled into flour, which can then be used to prepare breads, cakes, pies, pancakes, pastas, polenta (known in Corsica as pulenda), or used as thickener for stews, soups, and sauces. Chestnut cake may be prepared using chestnut flour. In Corsica, the flour is fried into doughnut-like fritters called fritelli and made into necci, pattoni, castagnacci, and cialdi. The flour can be light beige like that from Castagniccia, or darker in other regions. It is a good solution for long storage of a nutritious food. Chestnut bread can stay fresh as long as two weeks. Chestnut pudding was known in the cuisine of the former Schlobitten region (East Prussia). The nuts can also be eaten candied, boiled, steamed, deep-fried, grilled, or roasted in sweet or savory recipes. They can be used to stuff vegetables, poultry, fowl, and other edibles. They are available fresh, dried, ground, or canned (whole or in puree).

Candied chestnuts (whole chestnuts candied in sugar syrup, then iced) are sold under the French name marrons glacés or Turkish name kestane şekeri ("sugared chestnuts"). They appeared in France in the sixteenth century. Toward the end of nineteenth century, Lyon went into a recession with the collapse of the textile market, notably silk. Clément Faugier, a civil engineer, was looking for a way to revitalize the regional economy. In 1882 at Privas, he invented the technology to make marrons glacés on an industrial scale (although a great number of the more than 20 necessary steps from harvest to the finished product are still accomplished manually). Chestnuts are picked in autumn, and candied from the start of the following summer for the ensuing Christmas. Thus, the marrons glacés eaten at Christmas are those picked the year before.

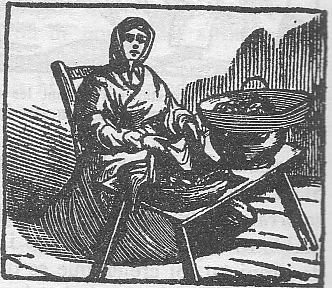
An auca of the 19th century with the image of Catalan Castanyera, the traditional seller of chestnuts.

In Spain, on 31 October on the eve of the All Saints' Day, Catalonia celebrates la castanyada, a festivity that consists of eating chestnuts, panellets, sweet potatoes and muscatell. On November, in the regions of Galicia, Asturias, Cantabria and other Northern provinces and Portugal, the Magosto is celebrated.

In Hungarian cuisine, cooked chestnuts are puréed, mixed with sugar (and usually rum), forced through a ricer, and topped with whipped cream to make a dessert called gesztenyepüré (chestnut purée). In Swiss cuisine, a similar dish made with kirsch and butter is called vermicelles. A French version is known as "Mont Blanc".

A fine granular sugar can be obtained from the fermentation of the juice, as well as a beer; the roasted fruit provides a coffee substitute. Parmentier, who among other things was a famous potato promoter, extracted sugar from chestnuts and sent a chestnut sugarloaf weighing several pounds to the Academy of Lyon. The continental blockade following shortly after (1806–1814) increased the research into developing chestnuts as a source of sugar, but Napoleon chose beets instead.

Sweet chestnuts are not easy to peel when cold. One kilogram of untainted chestnuts yields about 700 g of shelled chestnuts.

=== Animal fodder and litter ===
Chestnuts are often added to animal fodder. A first soak in limewater removes their bitter flavour, then they are ground and mixed with the ordinary provender. Other methods of preparation are also used. The leaves are not as prone to be insect-eaten as those of the oak, and are also used for fodder.

=== Timber ===
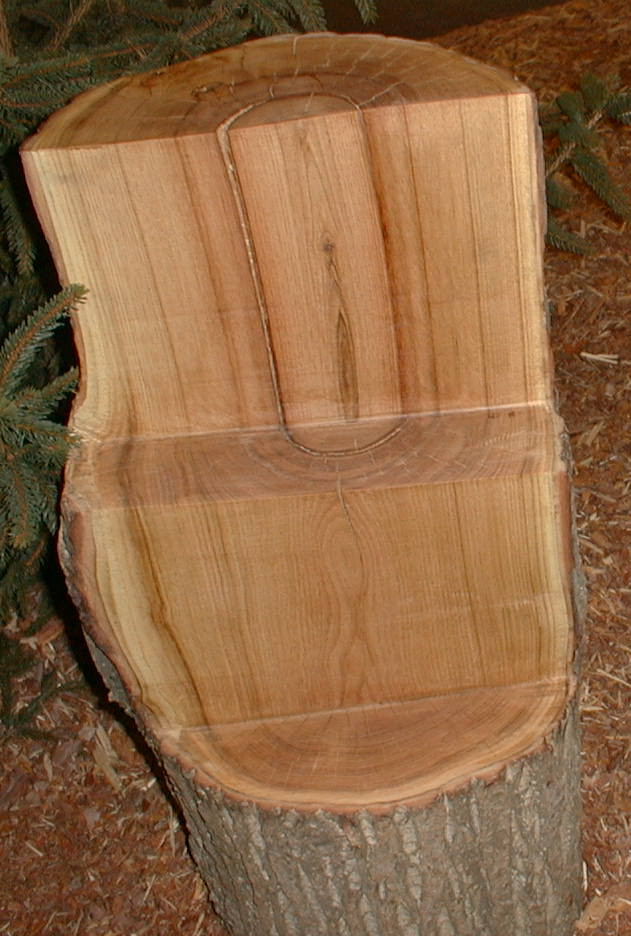
Chestnut wood: Note the splitting at the top of the log.

Chestnut is of the same family as oak, and likewise its wood contains many tannins. This renders the wood very durable, gives it excellent natural outdoor resistance, and saves the need for other protection treatment. It also corrodes iron slowly, although copper, brass, or stainless metals are not affected.

Chestnut timber is decorative. Light brown in colour, it is sometimes confused with oak wood. The two woods' textures are similar. When in a growing stage, with very little sap wood, a chestnut tree contains more timber of a durable quality than an oak of the same dimensions. Young chestnut wood has proved more durable than oak for woodwork that has to be partly in the ground, such as stakes and fences.

After most growth is achieved, older chestnut timber tends to split and warp when harvested. The timber becomes neither so hard nor so strong as oak. The American chestnut C. dentata served as an important source of lumber, because it has long, unbranched trunks. In Britain, chestnut was formerly used indiscriminately with oak for the construction of houses, millwork, and household furniture. It grows so freely in Britain that it was long considered a truly native species, partly because the roof of Westminster Hall and the Parliament House of Edinburgh were mistakenly thought to be constructed of chestnut wood. Chestnut wood, however, loses much of its durability when the tree is more than 50 years old, and despite the local chestnut's quick growth rate, the timber used for these two buildings is considerably larger than a 50-year-old chestnut's girth. It has been proven that the roofs of these buildings are made of Durmast oak, which closely resembles chestnut in grain and colour.

It is therefore uncommon to find large pieces of chestnut in building structures, but it has always been highly valued for small outdoor furniture pieces, fencing, cladding (shingles) for covering buildings, and pit-props, for which durability is an important factor. In Italy, chestnut is also used to make barrels used for aging balsamic vinegar and some alcoholic beverages, such as whisky or lambic beer. Of note, the famous 18th-century "berles" in the French Cévennes are cupboards cut directly from the hollowed trunk.

=== Fuel ===
Dry, chestnut firewood is best burned in a closed log-burner, because of its tendency to spit when on an open fire.

=== Leather ===
Chestnut wood is a useful source of natural tannin and was used for tanning leather before the introduction of synthetic tannins. On a 10% moisture basis, the bark contains 6.8% tannin and the wood 13.4%. The bark imparts a dark colour to the tannin, and has a higher sugar content, which increases the percentage of soluble non-tans, or impurities, in the extract; so it was not employed in this use. Chestnut tannin is obtained by hot-water extraction of chipped wood. It is an ellagic tannin and its main constituents are identified by castalagin (14.2%) and vescalagin (16.2%).

It has a naturally low pH value, relatively low salts content, and high acids content. This determines its astringency and its capability to fix raw hides. These properties make chestnut extract especially suitable for the tanning of heavy hides and to produce leather soles for high-quality shoes in particular. It is possible to obtain a leather with high yield in weight, which is compact, firm, flexible, and waterproof. Chestnut-tanned leathers are elastic, lightfast, resistant to traction and abrasion, and have warm colour.

Chestnut tannin is one of the pyrogallol class of tannins (also known as hydrolysable tannin). As it tends to give a brownish tone to the leather, it is most often used in combination with quebracho, mimosa, tara, myrabolans, and valonia. The wood seems to reach its highest tannin content after the trees reach 30 years old. The southern European chestnut wood usually contains at least 10 to 13% more tannin than chestnut trees in northern climates.

=== Other uses ===
Fabric can be starched with chestnut meal. Linen cloth can be whitened with chestnut meal. The leaves and the skins (husk and pellicle) of the fruit provide a hair shampoo.

Hydrolysable chestnut tannins can be used for partial phenol substitution in phenolic resin adhesives production and also for direct use as resin.

Chestnut buds have been listed as one of the 38 substances used to prepare Bach flower remedies, a kind of alternative medicine promoted for their claimed effects on health. There is no evidence that flower remedies control, cure or prevent any type of disease.

== In culture ==
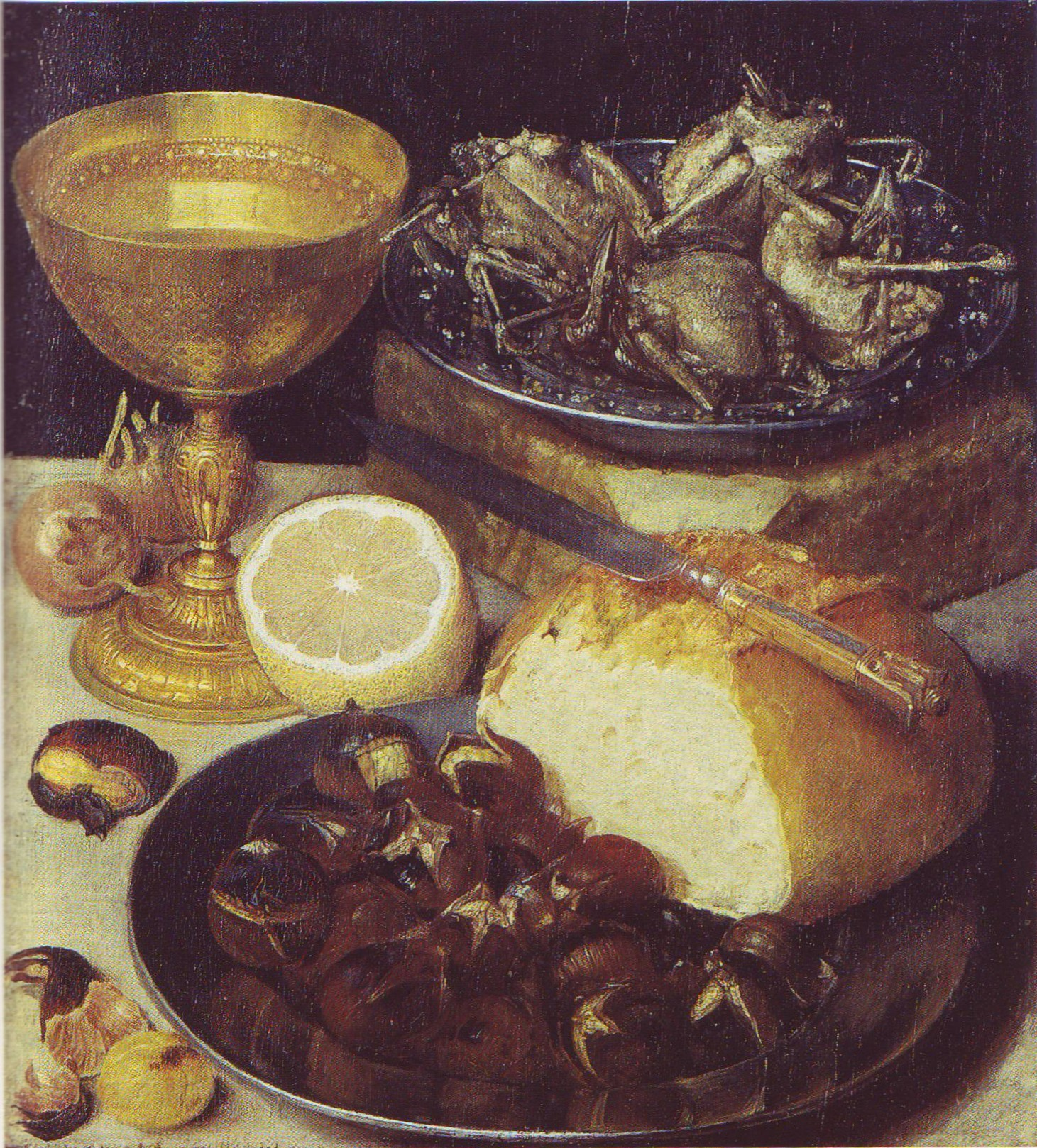
16–17th century still life with roasted chestnuts by Georg Flegel

- In the film based on the novel by E. M. Forster, Howards End, Mrs. Ruth Wilcox (Vanessa Redgrave) tells of her childhood home, where superstitious farmers would place pigs' teeth in the bark of the chestnut trees and then chew on this bark to ease toothaches. In the novel, the tree is actually a wych elm.
- Under the Spreading Chestnut Tree is a set of variations, with fugue, for orchestra composed in 1939 by Jaromír Weinberger.
- In Honoré de Balzac's novel Père Goriot, Vautrin states that Eugène de Rastignac's family is living off chestnuts; this symbolism is used to represent how impoverished Eugene's family is.
- "The Christmas Song" famously mentions chestnuts in its opening line, and is commonly subtitled "Chestnuts Roasting on an Open Fire."

=== Notable specimens ===
- Hundred Horse Chestnut on Mount Etna, 57.9 m (190 ft) circumference in 1780, (64 metres circumference in 1883)
- Tortworth Chestnut. 15.8 metres circumference in 1776, when it was described as "the largest tree in England"
- Sacred Chestnut of Istán, 13.5-metre (44 ft) circumference, estimated to be between 800 and 1,000 years old.

== See also ==
- Chestnut cake
- Chestnut pie
- Roasted chestnut
