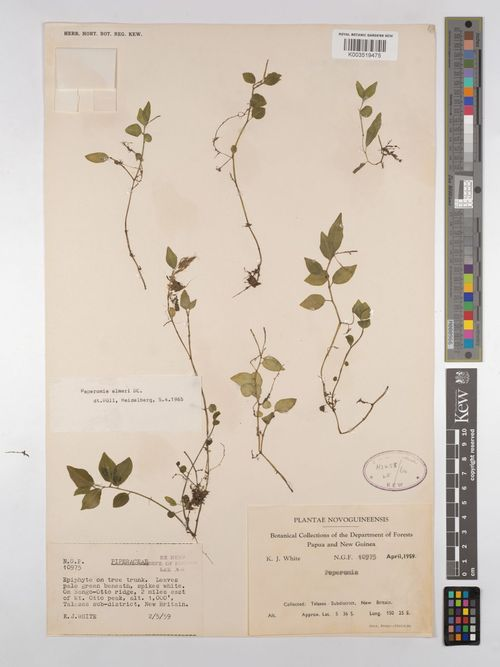

Scientific classification
- Kingdom: Plantae
- Clade: Tracheophytes
- Clade: Angiosperms
- Clade: Magnoliids
- Order: Piperales
- Family: Piperaceae
- Genus: Peperomia
- Species: P. elmeri

Binomial name
- Peperomia elmeri C.DC.

= Peperomia elmeri =

Species of flowering plant

Peperomia elmeri is a species of epiphyte in the genus Peperomia that is endemic in Philippines. It grows on wet tropical biomes. Its conservation status is Threatened.

== Description ==
The type specimen were collected near Mt Apo, Philippines.

Peperomia elmeri has leaves that are elliptic lance shaped, narrowed at both base and tip, with three veins, smooth on top and not densely hairy underneath, with hairy leaf stalks. Flower stalks grow from the leaf axils, three times longer than the leaf stalks, thin and smooth. Flower spikes are smooth and at maturity equal the leaf blades in length. The bract is circular with a very short stalk at the center. Anthers are elliptic. The ovary emerges above the flower, is egg shaped, and bears the stigma slightly below the tip. The stigma is dot shaped and smooth. The berry is round, scattered with small glands, and lacks a false cupule.

It is a succulent epiphytic herb with reddish roots. The stem is round, pressed flat with rough hairs, and when dried becomes flattened below, up to 2 mm thick, unbranched, and 30 cm (12 in) long. Leaves are alternate and rather spaced apart. Leaf blades are somewhat leathery in life and papery when dried, 4 cm (1.6 in) long and 2.9 cm (1.1 in) wide. Leaf stalks are 5 mm long. Flower stalks are 15 mm long. Mature flower spikes are 4 cm long and 1 mm thick when dried. Bracts are shield shaped and nearly 0.75 mm across. Berries are 0.75 mm in diameter.

== Taxonomy and naming ==
It was described in 1910 by Casimir de Candolle in Leaflets of Philippine Botany 3, from specimens collected by Adolph D. E. Elmer. It got its name from botanist who collected the type specimen.

== Distribution and habitat ==
It is endemic in Philippines. It grows on a epiphyte environment and is a herb. It grows on wet tropical biomes.

== Conservation ==
This species is assessed as Threatened, in a preliminary report.
