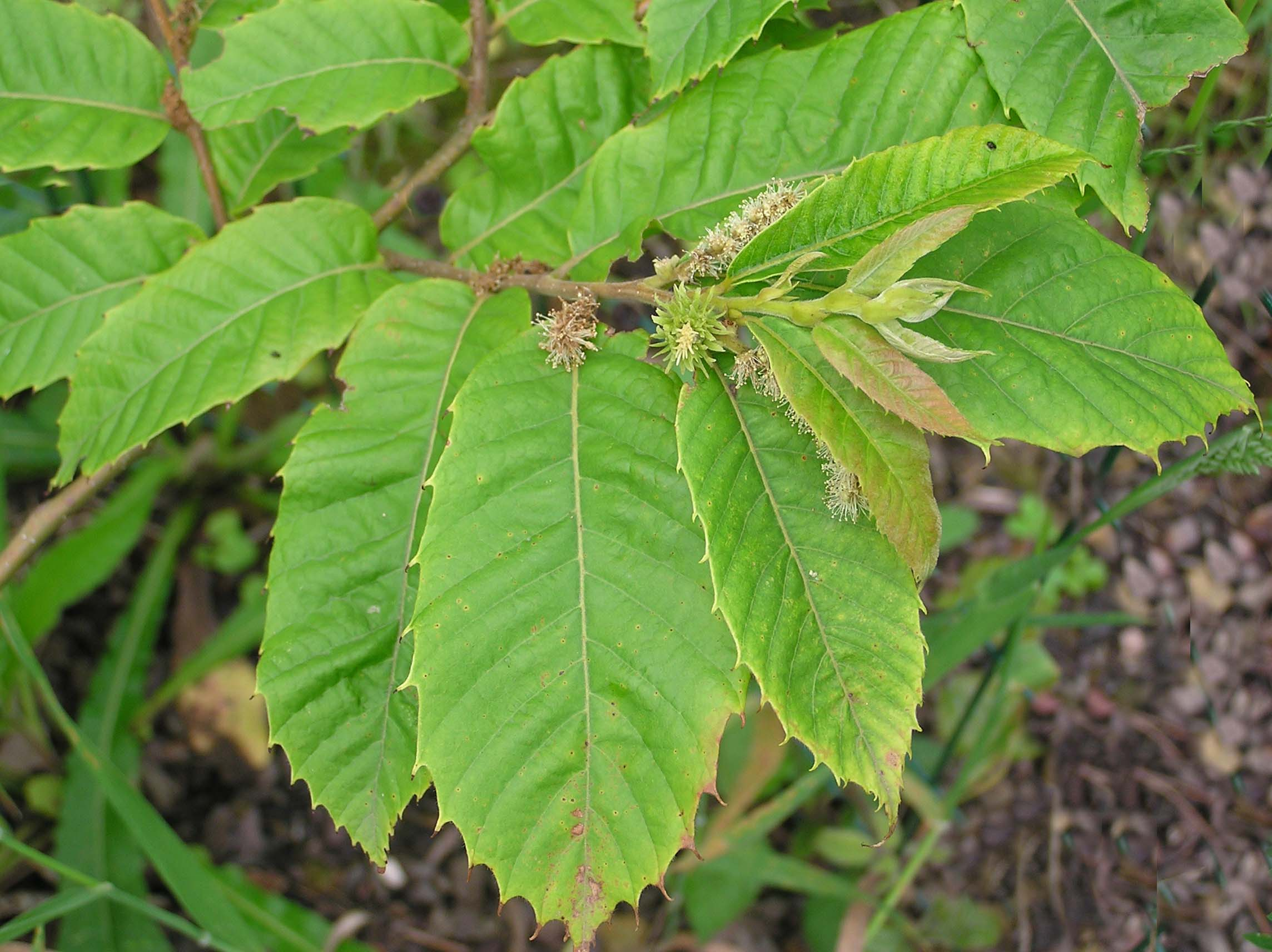

Scientific classification
- Kingdom: Plantae
- Clade: Tracheophytes
- Clade: Angiosperms
- Clade: Eudicots
- Clade: Rosids
- Order: Fagales
- Family: Fagaceae
- Subfamily: Castaneoideae
- Genus: Castanea
- Species: C. seguinii

Binomial name
- Castanea seguinii Dode

Synonyms
- Castanea davidii Dode

= Castanea seguinii =

Species of plant

Castanea seguinii, called Seguin chestnut, Seguin's chestnut, or Chinese chinquapin (a name it shares with Castanea henryi), and in Chinese: 茅栗, mao li, is a species of chestnut native to south‑central and southeast China.

== Description ==
Castanea seguinii are small trees or shrubs, rarely reaching 12 m. Their stipules are narrowly lanceolate, 0.7 to 1.5 cm long, and are shed (become deciduous) when the plant is in fruit. Leaf petioles are 0.5 to 1.5 cm long. Leaves are 6 to 14 cm long, with their abaxial sides covered with yellowish‑brown to gray scaly glands, and have sparse hairs along the veins when young. Leaf blades are oblong‑obovate to elliptic‑oblong in shape, with bases rounded or infrequently subcordate, but cuneate when young, with acuminate apices. Leaf margins are coarsely serrate. Male inflorescences are 5 to 12 cm long and catkin‑like. Female inflorescences are held in a cupule, with one to two (rarely more) flowers in each. Cupules are 3 to 5 cm wide, and covered with sparsely pilose spiny bracts which are 6 to 10 mm long. Each cupule produces two or three nuts, rarely more, with each nut being 1.5 to 2.0 cm in diameter.

== Ecology ==
Castanea seguinii grow in mixed mesophytic forests and thickets from 400 to 2000 m in elevation. Their bark is eaten by golden snub‑nosed monkeys (Rhinopithecus roxellana) in winter. In their native habitat they flower in May through July, and fruit from September to November.

== Uses ==
Its nuts are small, but are edible and occasionally cultivated or collected in the wild and consumed by locals. Locals also practice coppicing for firewood. Another use in China is as a trap crop for Dryocosmus kuriphilus gall wasps. By planting a hedge of C. seguinii around C. mollissima (Chinese chestnut) orchards, the wasps will first encounter and attack the buds of the less valuable C. seguinii, allowing the galled twigs to be cut off and destroyed.
