= Pellicle =

Pellicle may refer to:

- Pellicle (biology), a thin layer supporting the cell membrane in various protozoa
- Pellicle mirror, a thin membrane used to split a beam of light or as a protective layer in optical systems
- Pellicle (dental), the thin layer of salivary glycoproteins deposited on the teeth of many species through normal biologic processes
- Pellicle, a thin cover applied to photomasks in semiconductor device fabrication, protecting them from particle contamination
- Pellicle (cooking), a growth coating the surface of animal meat or fermented liquids, formed by proteins or cellulose
- Pellicle (material), a brand name for a very resistant synthetic material used for covering different surfaces, such as that of the Aeron chair
