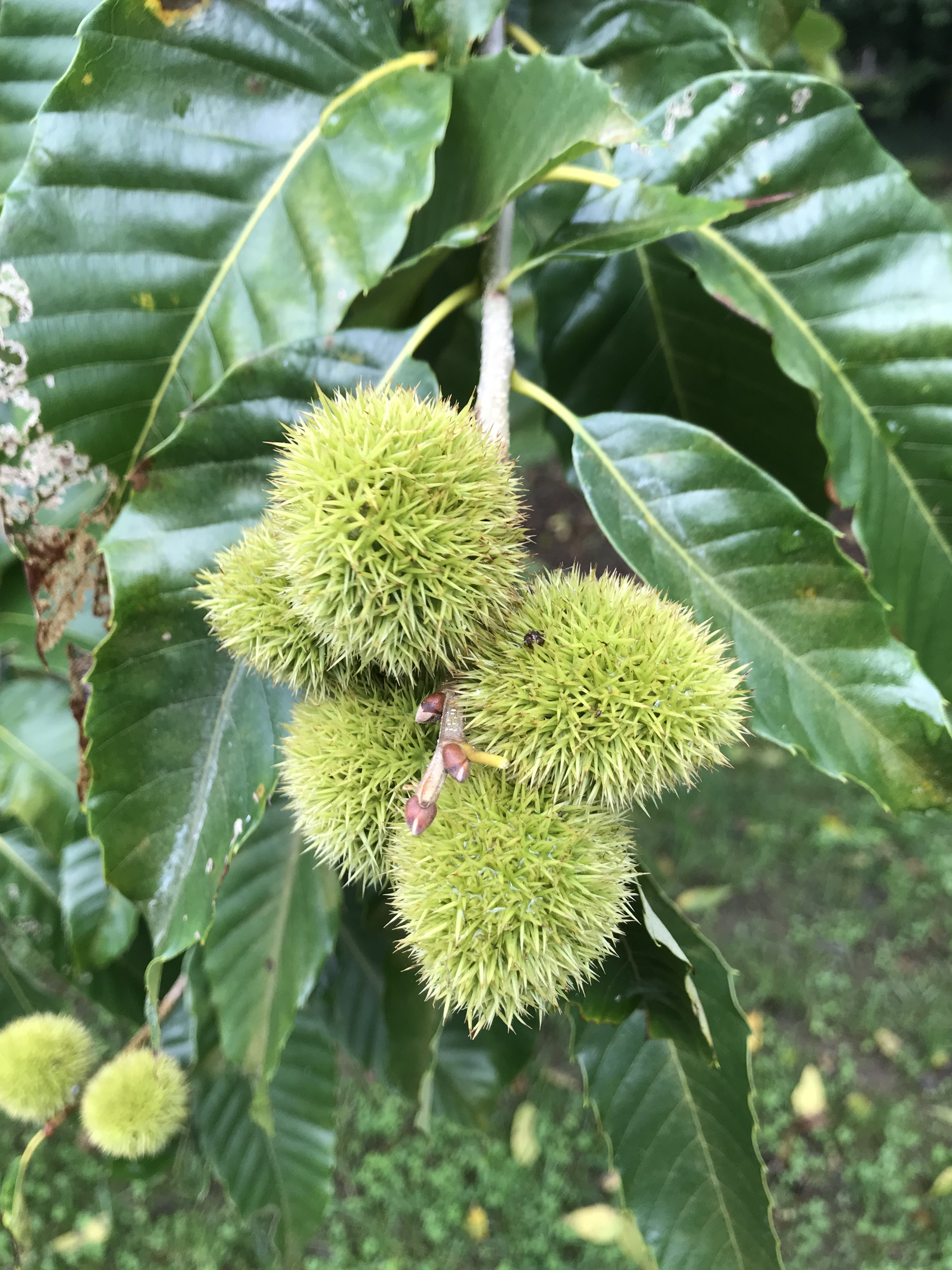
- In fruit

Scientific classification
- Kingdom: Plantae
- Clade: Tracheophytes
- Clade: Angiosperms
- Clade: Eudicots
- Clade: Rosids
- Order: Fagales
- Family: Fagaceae
- Subfamily: Castaneoideae
- Genus: Castanea
- Species: C. henryi

Binomial name
- Castanea henryi (Skan) Rehder & E.H.Wilson

Synonyms
- Castanea fargesii Dode; Castanea vilmoriniana Dode; Castanopsis henryi Skan

= Castanea henryi =

Species of plant

Castanea henryi, Henry chestnut, Henry's chestnut, or Chinese chinquapin (a name it shares with Castanea seguinii), pearl chestnut, and in Chinese 錐栗 (zhui li), is a species of chestnut native to south-central and southeast China. A tree reaching 30 m, it is a source of good timber, but has smaller nuts than its size might suggest. Like its close relative Castanea mollissima (Chinese chestnut), it is widely cultivated in China, and quite a few varieties have been developed in recent times.

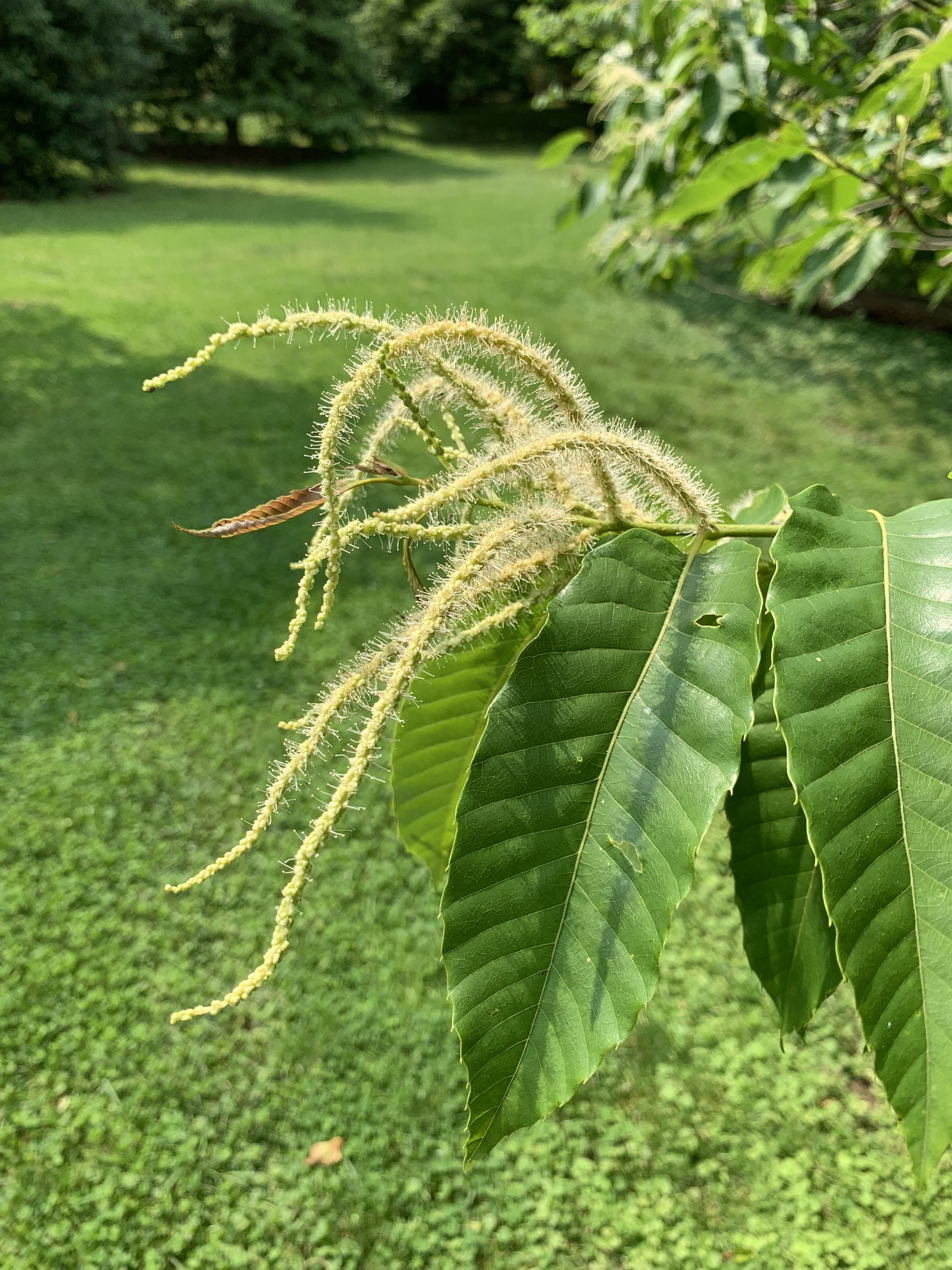
Flowers

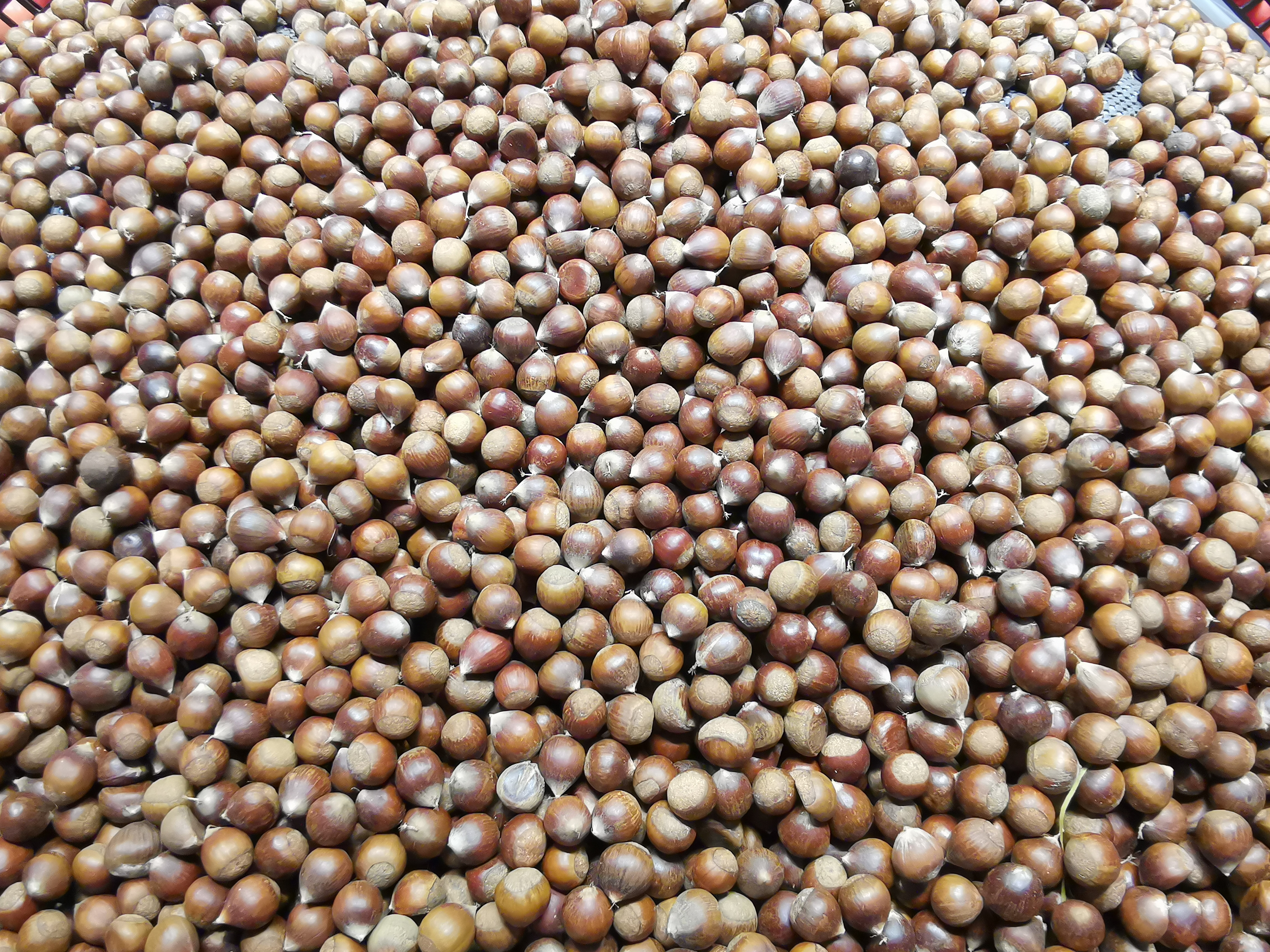
Nuts
