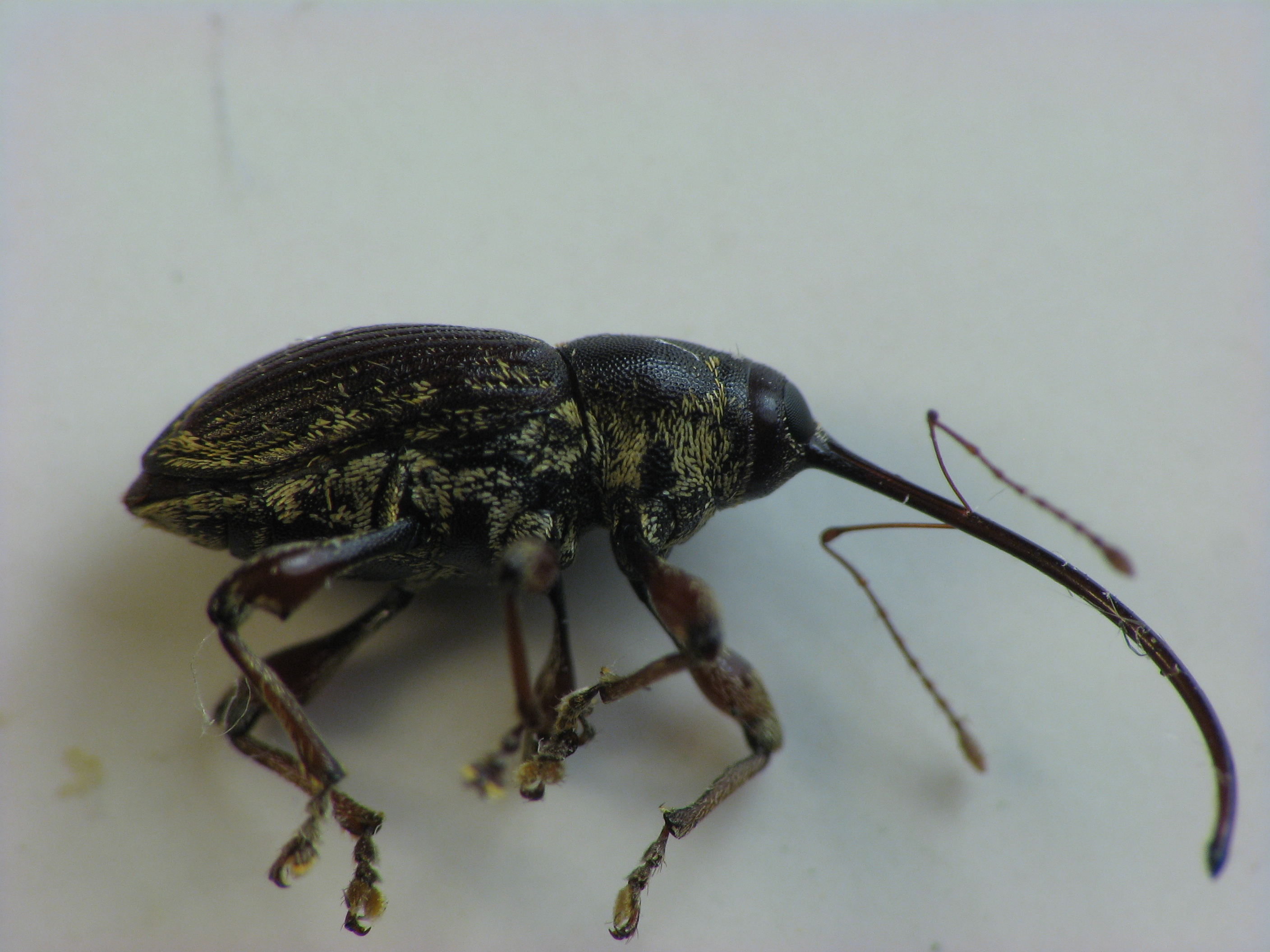

Scientific classification
- Kingdom: Animalia
- Phylum: Arthropoda
- Clade: Pancrustacea
- Class: Insecta
- Order: Coleoptera
- Suborder: Polyphaga
- Infraorder: Cucujiformia
- Superfamily: Curculionoidea
- Family: Curculionidae
- Genus: Curculio
- Species: C. sayi

Binomial name
- Curculio sayi (Gyllenhal, 1836)

Synonyms
- Balaninus acuminatus Casey, 1910; Balaninus algonquinus Casey, 1910; Balaninus auriger Casey, 1910; Balaninus macilentus Casey, 1910; Balaninus mollis Casey, 1910; Balaninus perexilis Casey, 1910; Balaninus setosicornis Casey, 1910; Balaninus sparsus Gyllenhal, 1836; Balaninus strigosus Casey, 1910

= Curculio sayi =

Species of beetle

Curculio sayi, the small or lesser chestnut weevil, is a species of true weevil in the family of beetles known as Curculionidae.

The lesser chestnut weevil is found in North America. The distribution of this species extends from Canada and Massachusetts to North Carolina, Tennessee, and Ohio, and probably farther westward. This weevil is highly host-specific. It has only been observed to feed and oviposit on the genus Castanea (chestnut and chinquapin).

Before the arrival of the chestnut blight, small chestnut weevils and the greater Curculio caryatrypes were prominent pests of the American chestnut crop. Reports from the early 1900s mentioned that large losses in American chestnut production occurred due to infestation by Curculio larvae. American chestnut crop infestation rates between 50% and 75% were considered normal. With the spread of the chestnut blight in American chestnut trees, the presumed host specific Curculio caryatrypes has been considered probably extinct. However the species was rediscovered in 2022 on Castanea pumila after photographs of it were shared on the website INaturalist. Curculio sayi is less host specific and reproduces in the chestnuts of other species of Castanea.

If left unchecked, weevil populations in an orchard can develop rapidly, reaching high levels of infestation in as little as two years. Infested nuts are less likely to germinate, if at all and nut damage affects chestnut seedling growth. The rate of nuts weevil infestation may vary between years, locations, cultivars, and even individual trees, burrs and nuts.

== Similar weevil species ==
An evolved specialized life style among chestnut weevils and other insect taxa is that female adults bore into specific plant tissue to oviposit. These plant tissues surround the weevil offspring while the offspring is feeding and developing. How this specialized life style could evolve to single host specificity is under scientific debate.

In Europe, Curculio elephas may occupy a similar ecological niche as Curculio sayi in North America. Curculio elephas is not as host specific as Curculio sayi in North America, as it oviposits in chestnuts and acorns of some oak species. For Curculio elephas, French research has shown that the chestnut infestation rate of sparsely spiky burrs (90%) and densely spiky burrs (2%) can show great variation at the same location and year. Female chestnut weevils laid more eggs close to the hilum in the lower half of a chestnut . Close to the hilum can be a burr area less spiky. Weevils deposited an egg into about one of four rostrum borings. Other research results suggest that chestnut weevil females avoid laying an egg into chestnuts of a certain development stage. French research found that, Curculio elephas females oviposited on average 20 eggs into chestnuts per life time/season. Further, the statistical chestnuts infestation distribution of a particular tree was zero-inflated. Zero-inflated models deal with statistical situations where an excessive number of chestnuts has zero weevil infestation. Most of the weevil infested chestnuts of a tree canopy were found in the South and West orientation. The timing of burr opening and the timing of nut drop apparently was not affected by weevil infestation of chestnuts.

In Hungary, most of the adult weevil activity in chestnut trees was noted on warm nights between 6pm and 10pm. Light traps at 12 meter (40 ft) height caught the most adult weevils. Other research on pecan weevils' flight behaviors suggests warm temperature dependency and sex differences. At a temperature range in the mid 80'F (27C) to mid 90'F (35C), female pecan weevils were more capable of flying high into the tree canopy. By comparison more male pecan weevils than female pecan weevils were observed crawling to the closest pecan tree trunk. In plum curculio air temperature above 68F (20C) changed crawling behavior to flying behavior.

In Kentucky and Indiana big brown bats were described as specialist predators of night flying beetles possibly also night flying weevils.

In plum curculio, the time gap from adult soil emergence to mating was 6–17 days.

Curculio elephas apparently exhibit capital breeding traits. On soil emergence, female adults carry developed eggs and apparently may not need to feed before egg laying. Egg laying pecan weevil females may feed by piercing pecan shells at the "water stage". What feeding behaviors Curculio sayi females may exhibit as compared to other weevil species has not been researched yet.

Both the European and North American chestnut weevil species exhibit an optionally extended life cycle. A prolonged or repeated diapause of individual larvae can result in individual life cycle completion of one, two, three or even four years.

In Curculio elephas a reported soil emergence from a single weevil larvae generation underneath oak tree canopy varied. Reported emergence rates were 66% the first year, 30% the second year and 4% the third year. Under controlled conditions, adult survival performance was similar between individuals emerging after one and two years.

A hypothesis is that diapause variation may be the response to seasonal environmental survival challenges. In a dry summer with hardened soil, one quarter to three quarter of the developed adults may not be able to emerge from the soil and perish. Hardened soils challenged emergence of the larger female weevil adults at a higher rate than the smaller male weevils. A season's environmental conditions may affect the sex ratio of surviving adults.

The mechanism for diapause variations is proposed to be bet hedging and not genotypic differences within a population.

Hazelnuts are affected by several different weevil species including Curculio dieckmanni (Faust), Curculio nucum L., Curculio obtusus Gibson, and Curculio occidentis.

== External morphology ==
The average length of the body alone is about 1/4 inch (6.4 mm).

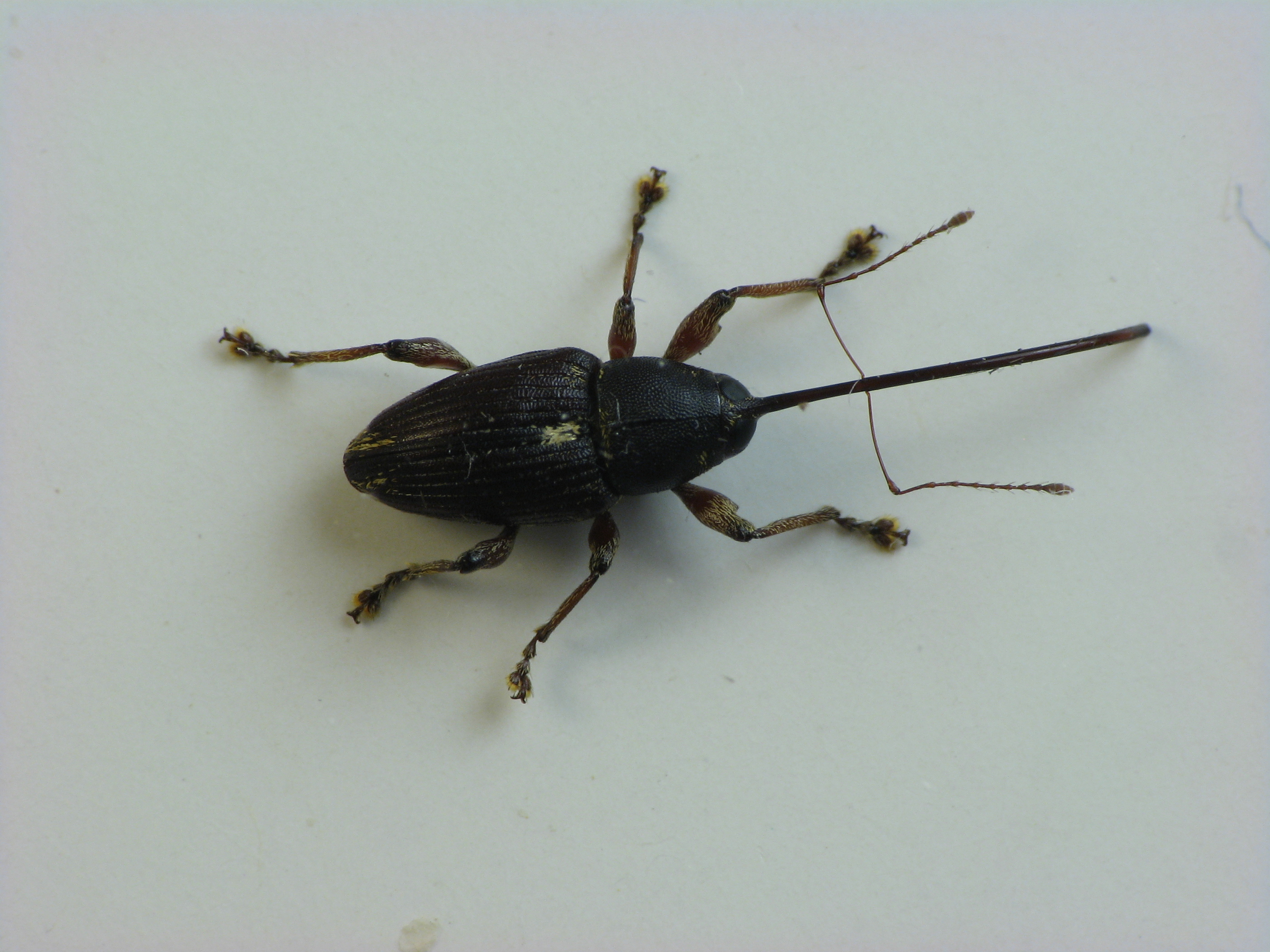
Dorsal view

Males are approximately 10 mm in overall length with comparatively shorter rostrums (slender snouts). Females are approximately 15 mm in overall length with comparatively longer rostrums.

In chestnut weevils, the long rostrum is considered to be a key adaptation measure. A rostrum helps bypass the sharp spines of a chestnut burr and the excavating action of a rostrum before egg laying avoids the drying of eggs later on. As a secondary benefit, the host's defensive burr facilitates protected egg hatching in the hosts from predators or parasitoids. In the small chestnut weevil the first segment of the antenna funicule is longer than the second.

== Life cycle ==
First soil emergence of adults may vary from May, June to July, according to locality and season - growing degree days. In Mid Missouri adults started emerging from the soil in May and June, stopped emerging in July and started emerging again in late August until October. In New York State, the adult population reached it peak in mid October at 2,500 growing degree days (DD50F). In Michigan, weevil populations are reported to fluctuate biennially - consistently higher populations in odd years compared to even years.

Adults, from a single generation of larvae, may emerge from the soil over multiple years. Seasonal population dynamics may vary in different climate zones. Male and female beetles emerge from the soil at similar times and at similar numbers. Dry and hardened soil conditions in summer and early fall may slow soil emergence and affect in-soil survival rates.

=== Development ===
A mated female weevil uses her long snout to chew a hole in the side of the nut shell or lining. Research on a similar chestnut weevil (Curculio elephas) in Europe suggest that egg laying may occur into selected chestnuts and not in random chestnuts. Reportedly, Curculio elephas was non-selective about what burr to approach. It was also non-selective to burrs in terms of pollinated chestnuts. Egg laying occurred at the same rate if a burr had one, two or three viable chestnuts. Research results suggests that European chestnut weevils select a specific nut quality for egg laying. Curculio elephas also did not appear to chemically mark a nut where it has deposited an egg, nor does it appear to sense in other ways if a nut already has an egg deposited. If this egg laying behavior is similar in Curculio sayi has not been researched. If Curculio sayi taste tests nut meat before egg laying or how many nuts the weevils probe before an egg is laid has not been researched. Clean adult weevil chew holes are usually too small to visually identify on the nut shell. Only when an adult weevil chew hole starts a mold infection, may weevil chewing activity become visually identifiable on the nut shell surface.

The nutrient quantity in a viable chestnut can support development of several weevil larvae (up to a dozen) at the same time.

Weevil eggs hatch in five to seven days. When hatched, the large, white, legless grubs (larvae) feed on the tissue of the growing chestnut kernels. When the larvae reach their last of four instar inside the chestnut, they chew a 1/8" hole in the chestnut shell and emerge. Many larvae may emerge and fall to the ground while the chestnut is still in the tree.

Peak emergence of larvae from fallen chestnuts occurs at six days post harvest and drops to low emergence levels by day 16 post harvest. A few larvae may still emerge from infested chestnuts more than four weeks post harvest. Refrigeration of harvested chestnuts or cold temperatures slows larvae development and emergence.

Most nut-emerged larvae burrow 7–15 cm below the soil line. There they build a soil chamber. They pupate after several months (up to 18 months or longer) and remain in their soil chamber for at least one season.

== Infestation controls ==
Cultural control through orchard sanitation may be a main step in managing chestnut weevil populations. Underground larval mortality of the European chestnut weevil was reported to be greater than 50%. Predation by mammals or invertebrates in an orchard may increase mortality rates. Natural mortality rates for Curculio sayi have not been researched yet.

Chemical control via insecticides of the adults is possible. Chemical control approaches require scouting and positive identification in August and September, and possibly weekly application of broad spectrum insecticides to the top of the orchard canopy.

Biological control of the small chestnut weevil larvae by applying entomopathogenic fungi and entomopathogenic nematodes to the soil may be possible. The effectiveness of entomopathogenic nematodes may take two to three years of soil applications before a decline in adult population numbers may be observed.

Postharvest heat treatment of collected chestnuts can stop development of weevil eggs and small larvae without destroying the viability of the nut. Soaking for 20 minutes in hot water maintained at 120 °F (49 °C) is an effective method.

Weevil larvae frass in the chestnut is associated with Aspergillus fungi which produce the diarrheagenic toxin emodin.

=== Scouting ===
Scouting for soil emerging adults is somewhat effective with a dark colored pyramid trap. These traps should be set one per acre well before chestnut bloom occurs and checked twice a week.

The most effective method of identifying weevil presence within an orchard is via limb-tapping over a light colored sheet. Weevils drop when a branch is jarred. Adult weevils are considered poor dispersers with an average flight distance of 220 m.
