= Corylus cornuta =

- Corylus cornuta var. californica growing at The Forest of Nisene Marks State Park

Conservation status
- Least Concern (IUCN 3.1)

- Secure (NatureServe)

Scientific classification
- Kingdom: Plantae
- Clade: Tracheophytes
- Clade: Angiosperms
- Clade: Eudicots
- Clade: Rosids
- Order: Fagales
- Family: Betulaceae
- Genus: Corylus
- Species: C. cornuta

Binomial name
- Corylus cornuta Marshall
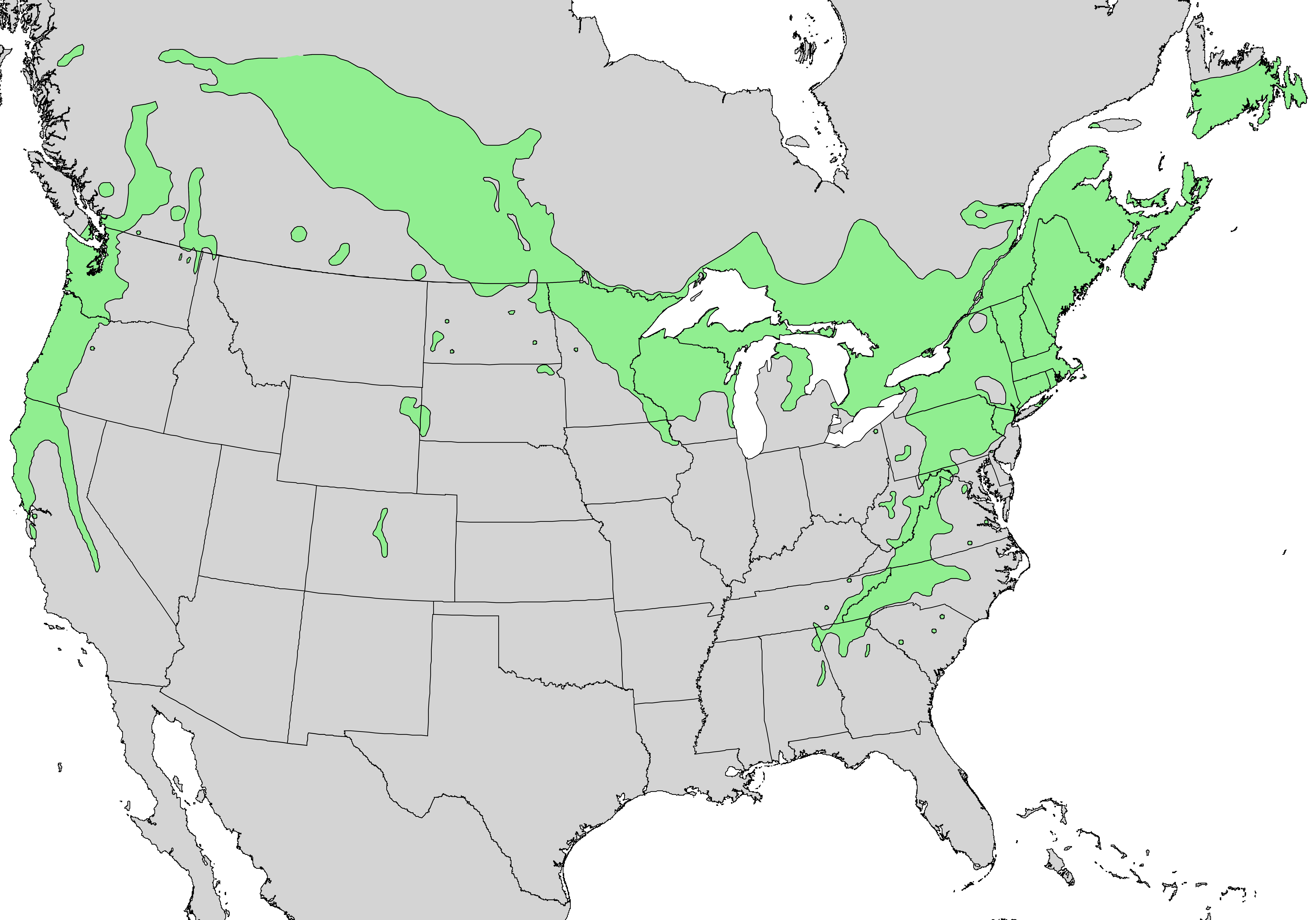
- Natural range of Corylus cornuta

Synonyms
- List: Corylus californica (A.DC.) A.Heller; Corylus cornuta Du Roi ex Steud.; Corylus cornuta var. californica (A.DC.) Sharp.; Corylus cornuta f. glandulosa (B.Boivin) T.C.Brayshaw; Corylus cornuta var. glandulosa B.Boivin; Corylus cornuta f. inermis Fernald; Corylus cornuta var. megaphylla Vict. & J.Rousseau; Corylus mexicana K.Koch; Corylus rostrata Aiton; Corylus rostrata var. californica A.DC.; Corylus rostrata var. tracyi Jeps.

Species of flowering plant

Beaked hazel (Corylus cornuta), raw
Nutritional value per 100 g (3.5 oz)
- Energy: 2,629 kJ (628 kcal)
- Carbohydrates: 22.98 g
- Dietary fiber: 9.8 g
- Fat: 52.99 g
- Protein: 14.89 g
Vitamins and minerals
| Vitamins | Quantity %DV^{†} |
| Thiamine (B1) | 40% 0.480 mg |
| Riboflavin (B2) | 12% 0.160 mg |
| Niacin (B3) | 20% 3.190 mg |
| Vitamin B6 | 32% 0.550 mg |
| Minerals | Quantity %DV^{†} |
| Calcium | 34% 441 mg |
| Copper | 133% 1.200 mg |
| Iron | 17% 3.12 mg |
| Magnesium | 56% 235 mg |
| Manganese | 330% 7.600 mg |
| Phosphorus | 33% 411 mg |
| Potassium | 25% 738 mg |
| Sodium | 0% 2 mg |
| Zinc | 19% 2.06 mg |
- Other constituents: Quantity
- Water: 5.92 g
- Link to USDA Database entry
- ^{†}Percentages estimated using US recommendations for adults, except for potassium, which is estimated based on expert recommendation from the National Academies.

Corylus cornuta, the beaked hazelnut (or just beaked hazel), is a deciduous shrubby hazel with two subspecies found throughout most of North America.

== Description ==
The beaked hazelnut can reach 4–8 metres (13–26 feet) tall with stems 10–25 centimetres (4–9 3/4 inches) thick with smooth gray bark, but it can also remain relatively small in the shade of other plants. It typically grows with several trunks.

The leaves are arranged in an alternate pattern. They are a rounded oval shape with a pointed tip and irregularly double-toothed margins. The leaves are 5–11 cm (2–4 1/4 in) long and 3–8 cm (1 1/4–3 1/4 in) broad, with soft and hairy undersides.

The male flowers are firm catkins which form in clusters of 1-3 units on the previous year's twigs. They become elongated and pendulous in spring. Single female flowers develop in early spring.

The beaked hazelnut is named for its fruit, which is a nut enclosed in a husk with a tubular extension 2–4 cm (3/4–1 1/2 in) long that resembles a beak. Tiny filaments protrude from the husk and may stick into, and irritate, skin that contacts them. The spherical nuts are small and surrounded by a hard shell. The beaked hazel is the hardiest of all hazel species, surviving temperatures of −50 °C (−58 °F) at its northern limits.

It has a shallow and dense root system which is typically only 15 cm (6 in) deep, with a single taproot which may extend 0.6 m (2 ft) below the surface.

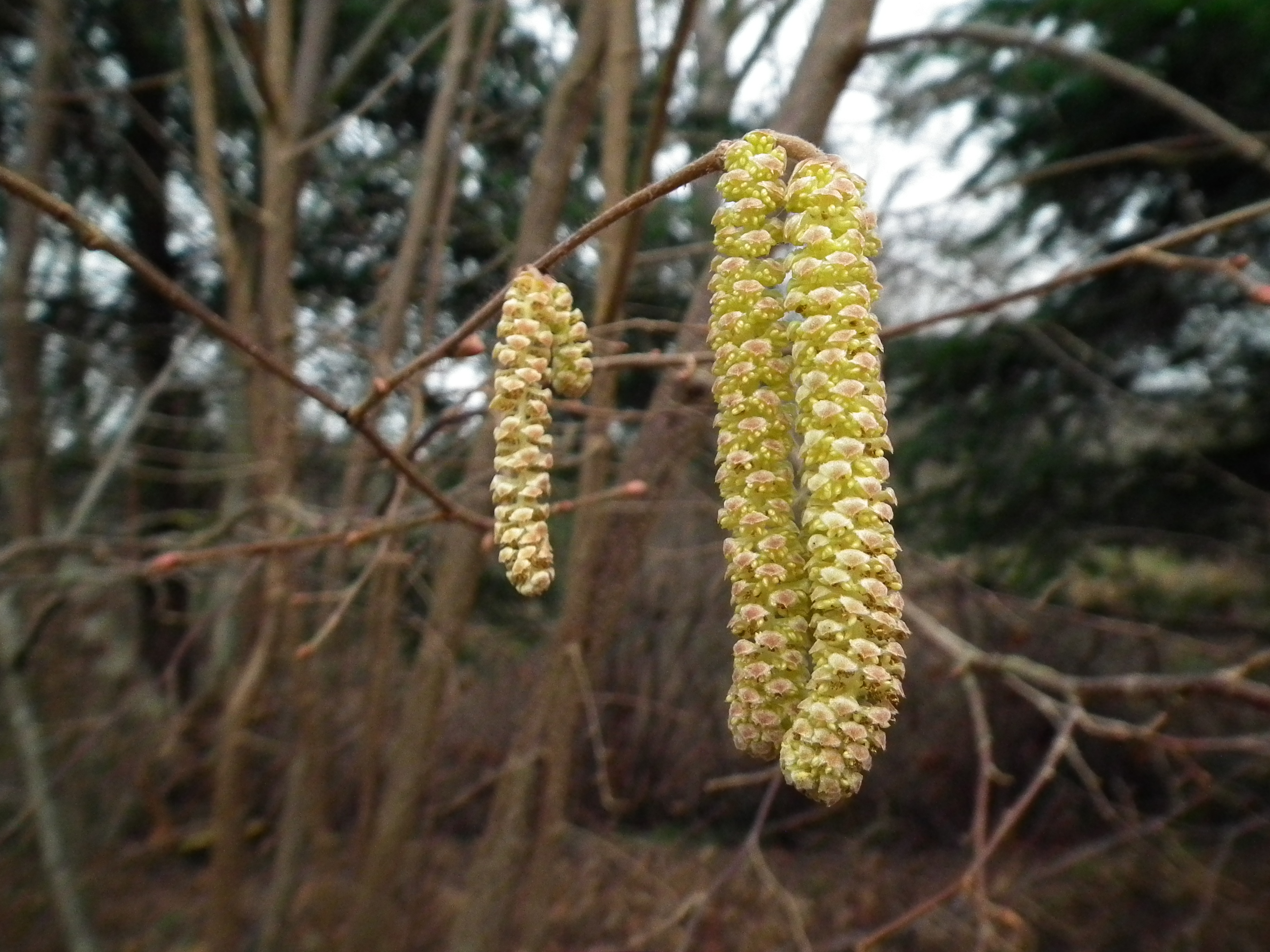
Male catkins

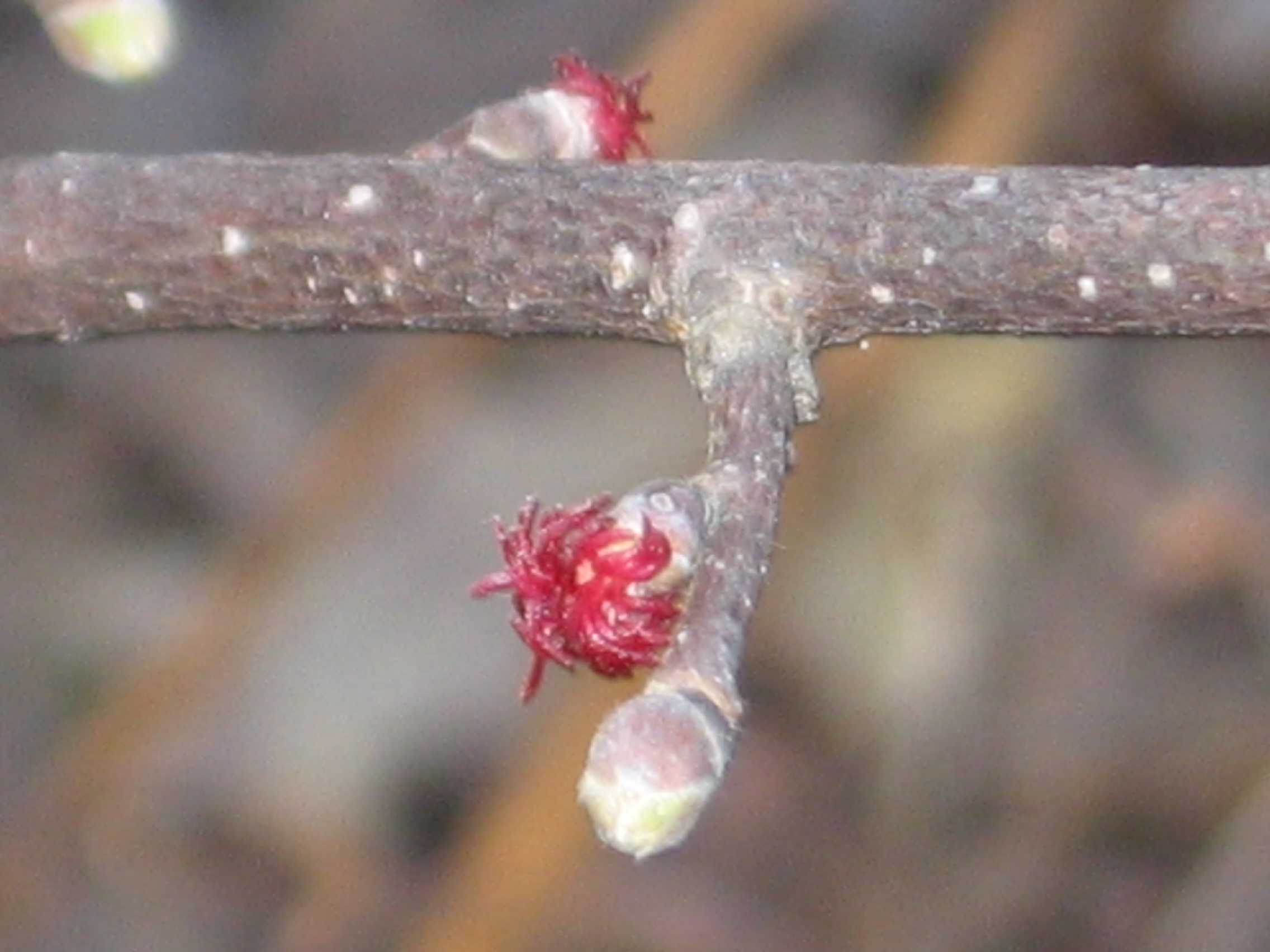
Female flowers

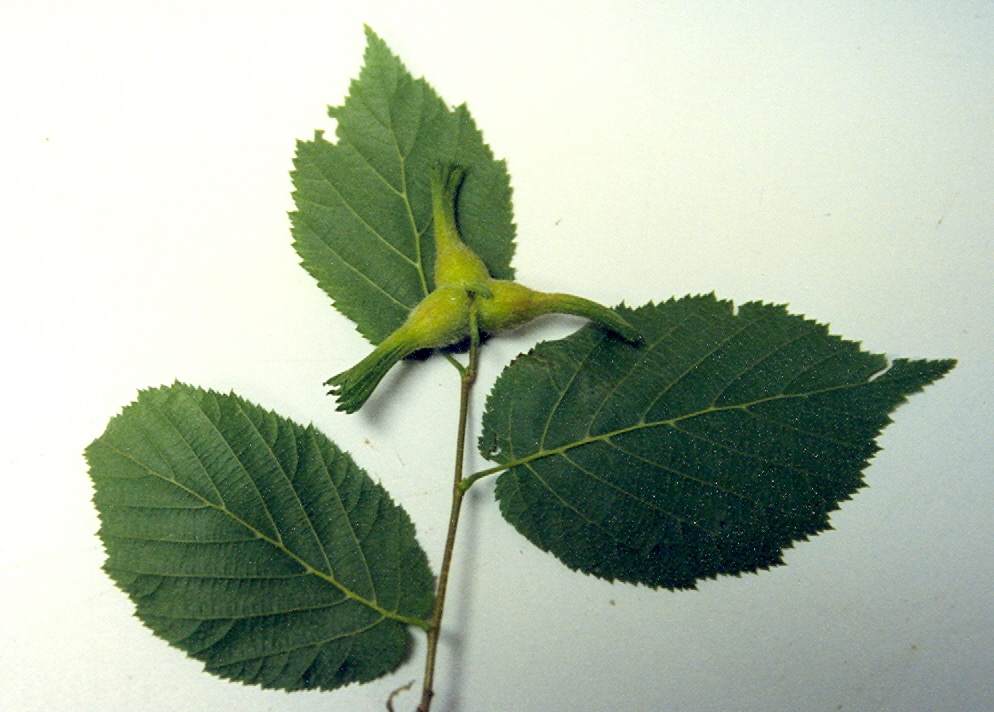
Leaves (and three fruits forming)

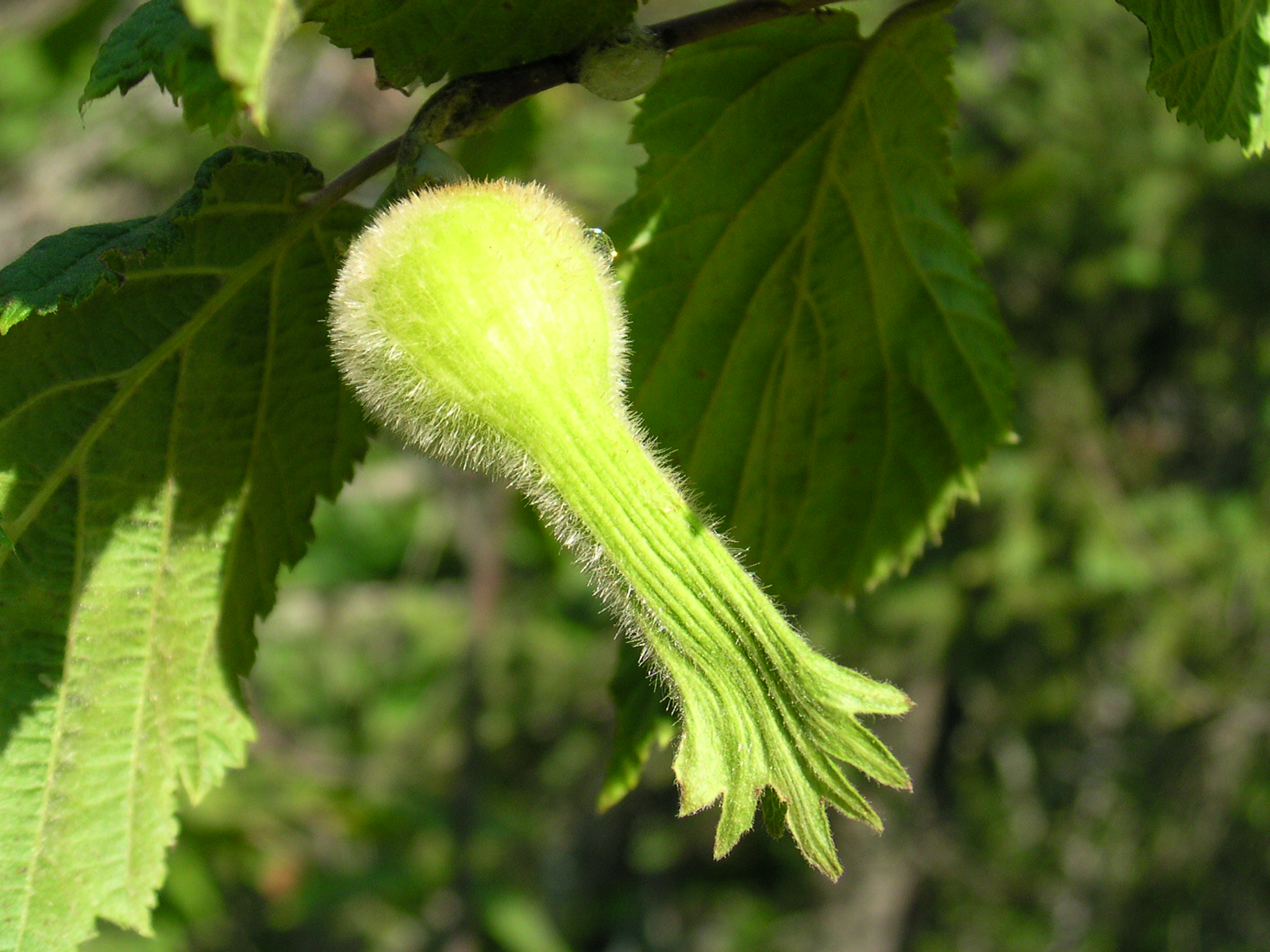
Immature fruit showing the "beak"

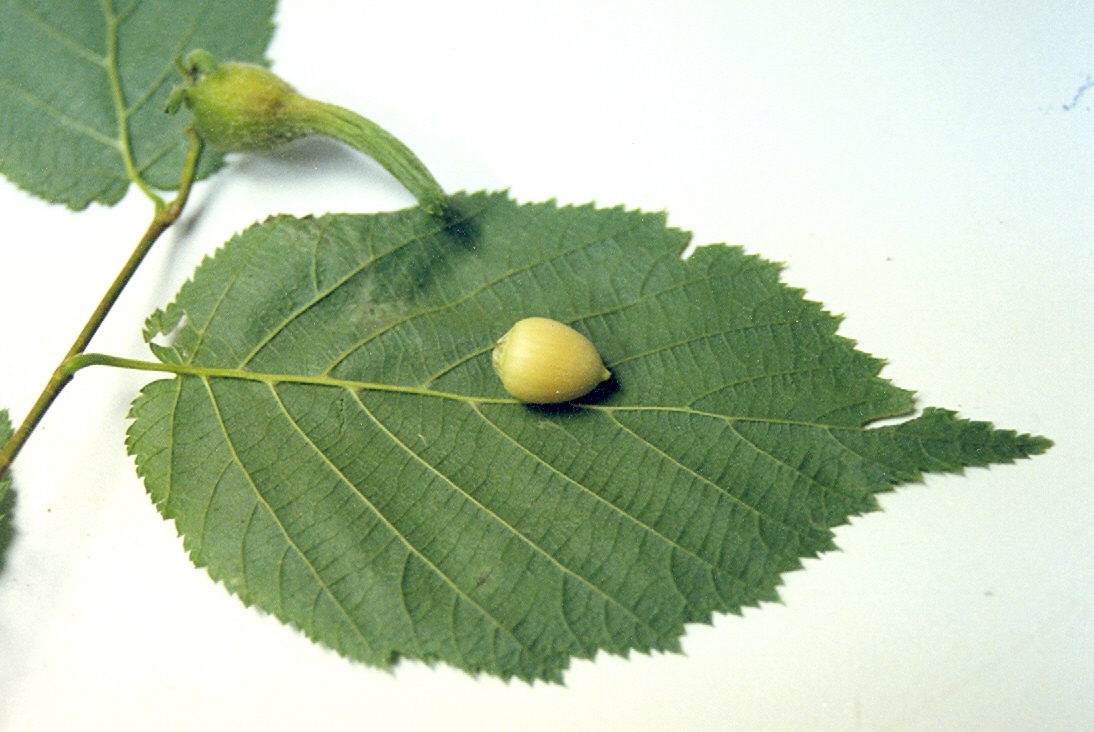
An immature nut with its hard shell

=== Varieties ===
There are two varieties, divided by geography:

- Corylus cornuta var. cornuta – Eastern beaked hazel. Small shrub, 4 to 6 m (13 to 20 ft) tall; 'beak' longer, 3 cm (1 1/4 in) or more. Occurs from 100–500 m (330–1,640 ft) throughout its range, and up to 1,000 m (3,300 ft) in Alberta.
- Corylus cornuta var. californica – Western beaked hazel or California hazelnut. Large shrub, 4 to 15 m (13 to 49 ft) tall; 'beak' shorter, usually less than 3 cm (1 1/4 in). Occurs below 2,100 m (6,900 ft) in California, and below 800 m (2,600 ft) in British Columbia. The Concow tribe called this variety gōm'-he'-ni (Konkow language). The California hazelnut is believed to be resistant to Eastern filbert blight.

== Distribution and habitat ==
Eastern beaked hazel is found from southern Canada south to Georgia, while the Western beaked hazel occurs along the west coast from Alaska to California.

== Ecology ==
Although C. cornuta is somewhat shade tolerant, it is more common in forests with fairly open canopies than denser ones. However, it is intolerant of entirely open areas that get hot and dry.

Fire kills the above-ground portion of the shrub, but it resprouts fairly readily after fire from its root crown or rhizomes. It recovers after fire to the extent that American Indians in California and Oregon used fire to encourage its growth.

In boreal regions, it is threatened by the invasive Siberian peashrub, which can invade and achieve dominance in understories.

=== Use by animals ===
Deer, moose, and livestock browse the foliage of the Eastern beaked hazel, but the Western beaked hazel is considered to have low palatability for ungulates. The hazelnut weevil feeds solely off the Western beaked hazel.

American beavers prefer Eastern beaked hazel browse, and consume it to such an extent that they reduce its relative abundance in favor of conifers.

The nuts of C. cornuta californica are an important food source for squirrels, especially as a backup in times of acorn crop failure. Species such as Douglas squirrels, red squirrels and least chipmunks gather and stash the nuts, and although up to 66% of the nuts are consumed, the remainder have an elevated chance of germination due to being buried in soil or leaves. Although squirrels only distribute the nuts about 90 m (300 ft) or less, jays such as the blue jay in the east and the Steller's jay in the west distribute them over longer distances. Black bears, turkeys, and white-tailed deer also consume the nuts.

Ruffed grouse consume the protein-rich catkins and young buds of Corylus cornuta.

It is used as cover by a variety of animal species, and provides good nesting for birds, especially the ruffed grouse. The white-footed vole is positively correlated with California hazelnuts in the Umpqua National Forest in Oregon.

== Uses ==
The beaked hazelnut has been cultivated by the Gitxsan, Tsimshian, and Nisga'a peoples for at least 7,000 years.

Native Americans used the sprouts to create baskets, fish traps, and baby carriers. The nuts were eaten and commonly used as a trade good among indigenous groups—both the Lewis and Clark expedition and prolific early naturalist David Douglas bartered for beaked hazelnuts with local peoples they encountered. It was used medicinally as emetic, for deworming, as an astringent, and for teething.

It is considered an excellent nut, with the same uses as any hazelnut. While the beaked hazelnut does not produce as many nuts as commercial European species such as the common hazel or filbert, it is more resistant to common diseases, and has been used in breeding programs to create high-yield, disease resistant hybrids.

It is used in restoration plantings to increase biodiversity, improve food sources for wildlife, and to reduce rates of laminated root rot in nearby Douglas-fir and Sitka spruce.
