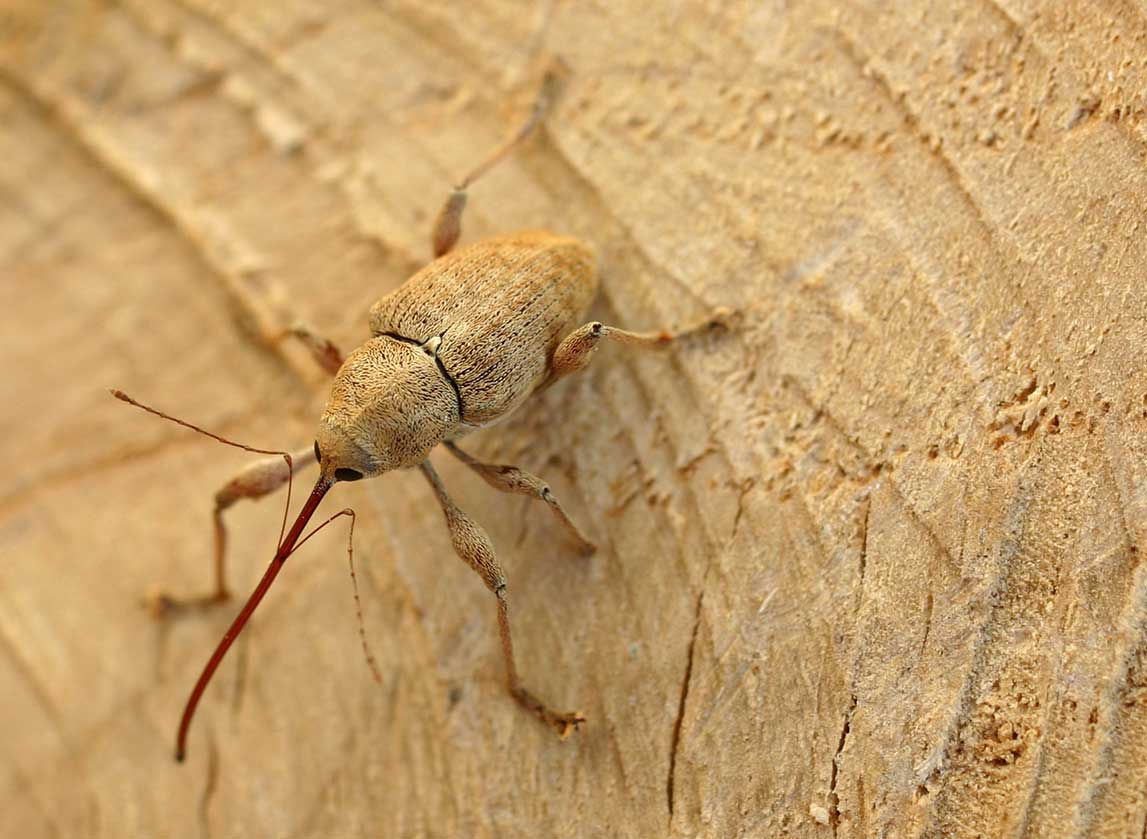

Scientific classification
- Kingdom: Animalia
- Phylum: Arthropoda
- Class: Insecta
- Order: Coleoptera
- Suborder: Polyphaga
- Infraorder: Cucujiformia
- Family: Curculionidae
- Genus: Curculio
- Species: C. elephas

Binomial name
- Curculio elephas Fabricius, 1781

Synonyms
- Balaninus elephas Gyllenhal, 1835; Curculio elephas (Gyllenhal, 1835)

= Curculio elephas =

Chestnut weevil

Species of beetle

Curculio elephas is a species of beetle in the family Curculionidae, the true weevils. It is known commonly as the chestnut weevil. It is a serious pest of chestnut (Castanea sativa) in Europe.

Curculio elephas are similar to Curculio sayi and Curculio caryatrypes in the United States.

== Development ==
Adults feed on chestnut foliage until nut kernels enter the dough stage in mid to late August. Although they can lay eggs any time after kernel filling, most eggs are laid after the bur begins to open. The adult female weevil drills a hole in a chestnut fruit and deposits one egg inside. The eggs are laid into the cupules or around the peduncle joints. Eggs hatch in five to seven days producing large, legless grubs. When the larva emerges from the egg it feeds on the developing chestnut. The larvae leave behind frass and excrement. Infested nuts may contain several weevil larvae or weevil burrows filled with excreta. Upon chestnuts fall, the larvae chew their way out of the nuts and retreat into the ground. They immediately bury themselves several centimeters deep in the soil. The following July, the larvae turn into pupae. Pupae may be in the soil for one season or for several years due to prolonged larval diapause in some individuals. Adult weevils from an extended diapause, emerge, on the average, 1–10 days before those with a simple diapause. The emergence of adult weevils occur always from mid-August to early October. The emerged adults live in the canopy of the chestnut tree.

When a summer is dry, some adults cannot emerge because of the hardness of the soil. Emergence success of females can be between 27–78% versus males. The result is that the sex ratio is female-biased before soil emergence and male-biased after. The year after a summer drought, many reproducing females may emerge from larvae with prolonged diapause.

== Infestation ==
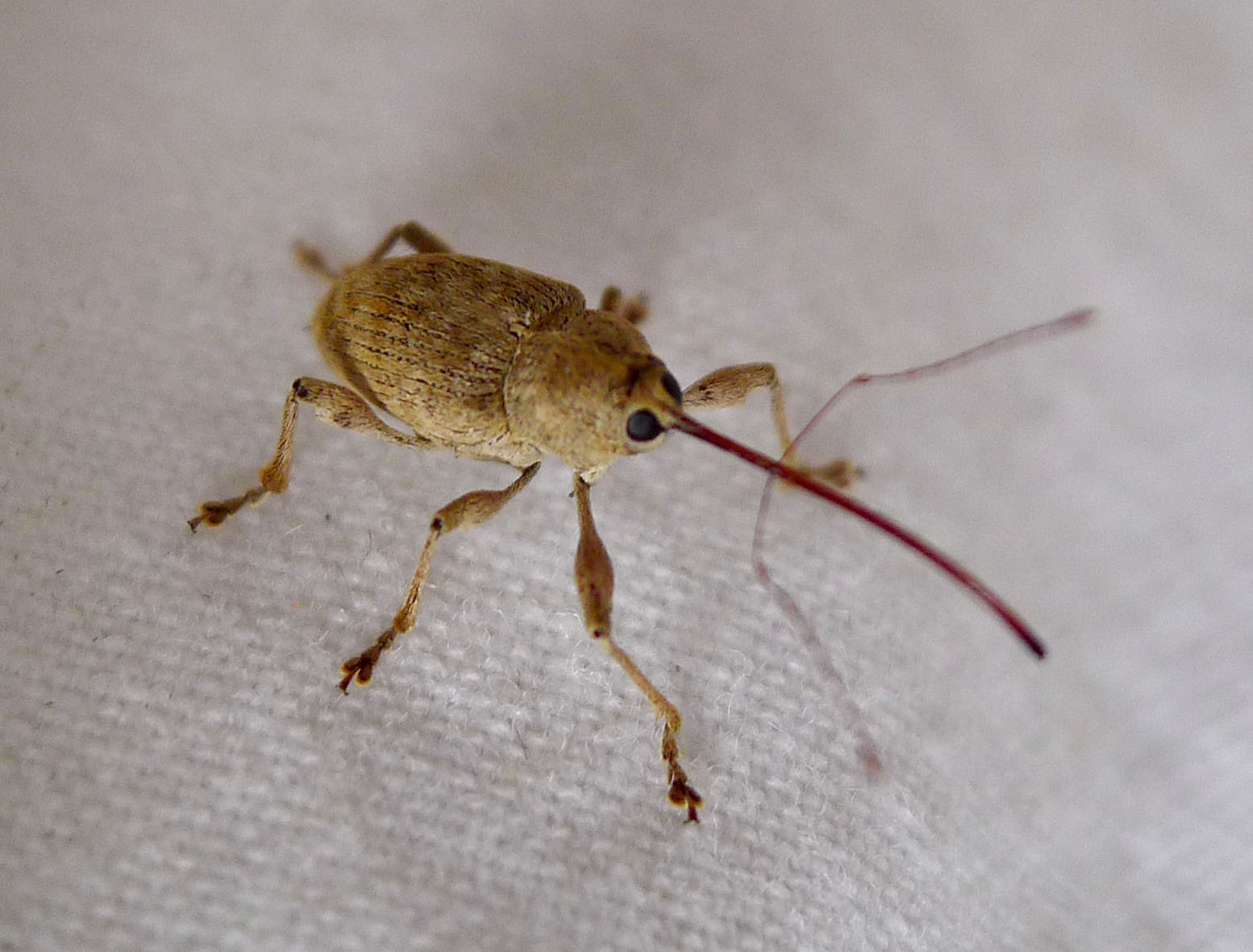
Curculio elephas

Curculio elephas is not limited to the chestnut. It is also a main predator of the acorns of holm oak (Quercus ilex) and turkey oak. The larvae feed and develop inside the acorns. Planting chestnut orchards beside turkey oak or holm oak stands is not advised in Europe, because both trees are susceptible to the chestnut weevil. Infested holm oak and turkey oak acorns can pass weevils on to chestnut trees.

The adult weevils can be scouted and monitored for their presence by jarring the tree and counting fallen weevils on a white surface.

The larvae of the chestnut weevil must chew their way out of a fallen nut. Increased orchard infestation occurs mostly where chestnuts lie on the ground for a sufficient length of time, or where the trees produce many small fruits which remain behind at the harvest. This allows many larvae to develop and burrow into the ground of an orchard.

In some chestnut-growing regions, infestation of the fruit by weevil larvae can reach 90%.

In China, in 2001, annually, about 20–30% of harvested chestnuts were wasted and spoiled by insect infestation and mildew.

In Hungary, Curculio elephas swarms in chestnut orchards around August 20, particularly strongly around noon and in sunny weather.

== Controls ==
Timing the harvests to pick up the chestnuts as soon as they fall reduces the numbers of the overwintering larvae. Regular soil work is also unfavourable to its life habits. Chemical control of the pest is difficult or unsustainable. Sevin is the only insecticide registered in the US for chestnuts. Applications have proven effective if applied during the mating and early egg-laying period, from early August to mid-September. Other suggested control methods include the use of biological pest control agents, such as fungi and physical controls such as radio waves and heat.

In Turkey, treatments of soil underneath fruit gathered into piles for ripening with entomopathogenic Metarhizium brunneum strains ARSEF 4556 and V275 alone and in combination with the entomopathogenic nematodes Heterorhabditis bacteriophora have been successful.

In Hungary, in 1971, a warm, aerosol-based protection was developed for older trees, by Sifter and Bürgés.

Weevil damage can be reduced by gathering nuts daily to reduce development time before thermal treatment. Most insects in harvested fruits and nuts can be controlled by thermal treatments over a temperature range of 46–56 °C. Heating gathered chestnuts to 120 °F (49 °C) for 20 to 30 minutes kills developing eggs and larvae in the nuts.
