= Curculio pardalis =

Scientific classification
- Domain: Eukaryota
- Kingdom: Animalia
- Phylum: Arthropoda
- Class: Insecta
- Order: Coleoptera
- Suborder: Polyphaga
- Infraorder: Cucujiformia
- Family: Curculionidae
- Genus: Curculio
- Species: C. pardalis

Binomial name
- Curculio pardalis (Chittenden, 1908)

Synonyms
- Balaninus appalachius Casey, 1910; Balaninus parvicollis Casey, 1910; Curculio multifasciatus Chittenden, 1927

Species of beetle

Curculio pardalis is a species of true weevil in the beetle family Curculionidae. It is found in North America.
