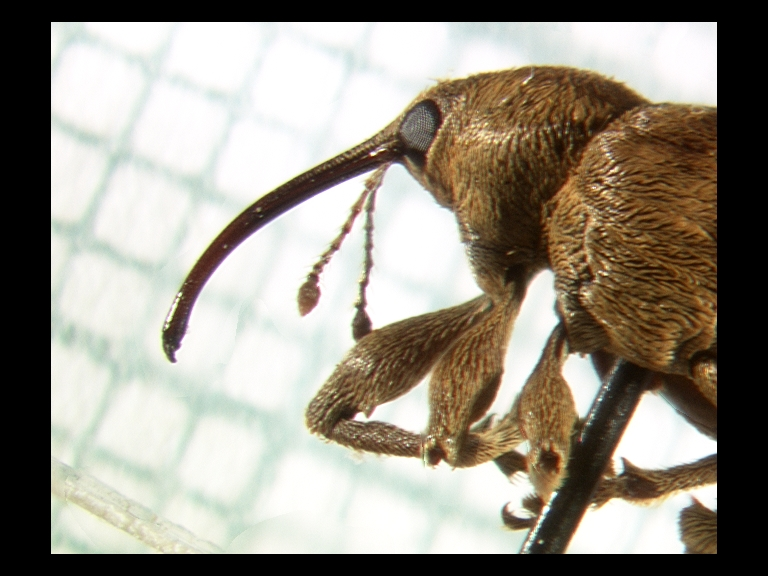

Scientific classification
- Kingdom: Animalia
- Phylum: Arthropoda
- Class: Insecta
- Order: Coleoptera
- Suborder: Polyphaga
- Infraorder: Cucujiformia
- Family: Curculionidae
- Genus: Curculio
- Species: C. iowensis

Binomial name
- Curculio iowensis (Casey, 1910)

Synonyms
- Curculio exilis Chittenden, 1927; Curculio funicularis Chittenden, 1927; Curculio ibis Chittenden, 1927; Curculio numenius Chittenden, 1927

= Curculio iowensis =

Species of beetle

Curculio iowensis is a species of true weevil in the beetle family Curculionidae. It is found in North America.
