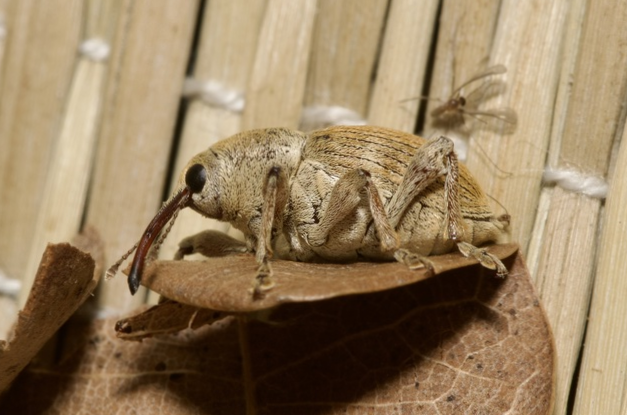
- Adult Curculio gyongyiae

Scientific classification
- Domain: Eukaryota
- Kingdom: Animalia
- Phylum: Arthropoda
- Class: Insecta
- Order: Coleoptera
- Suborder: Polyphaga
- Infraorder: Cucujiformia
- Family: Curculionidae
- Genus: Curculio
- Species: C. gyongyiae

Binomial name
- Curculio gyongyiae Szénási, 2022

= Curculio gyongyiae =

Species of weevil

Curculio gyongyiae is a species of weevil first discovered in 2022 in Esztergom, Hungary. Specimens from Greece and Croatia have also been identified. The average body length of females is 6.7 millimeters, and that of males is 6.5 millimeters. It was initially discovered by Valentin Szénási, who named the species after his wife, Szénásiné Demeter Gyöngyi.
