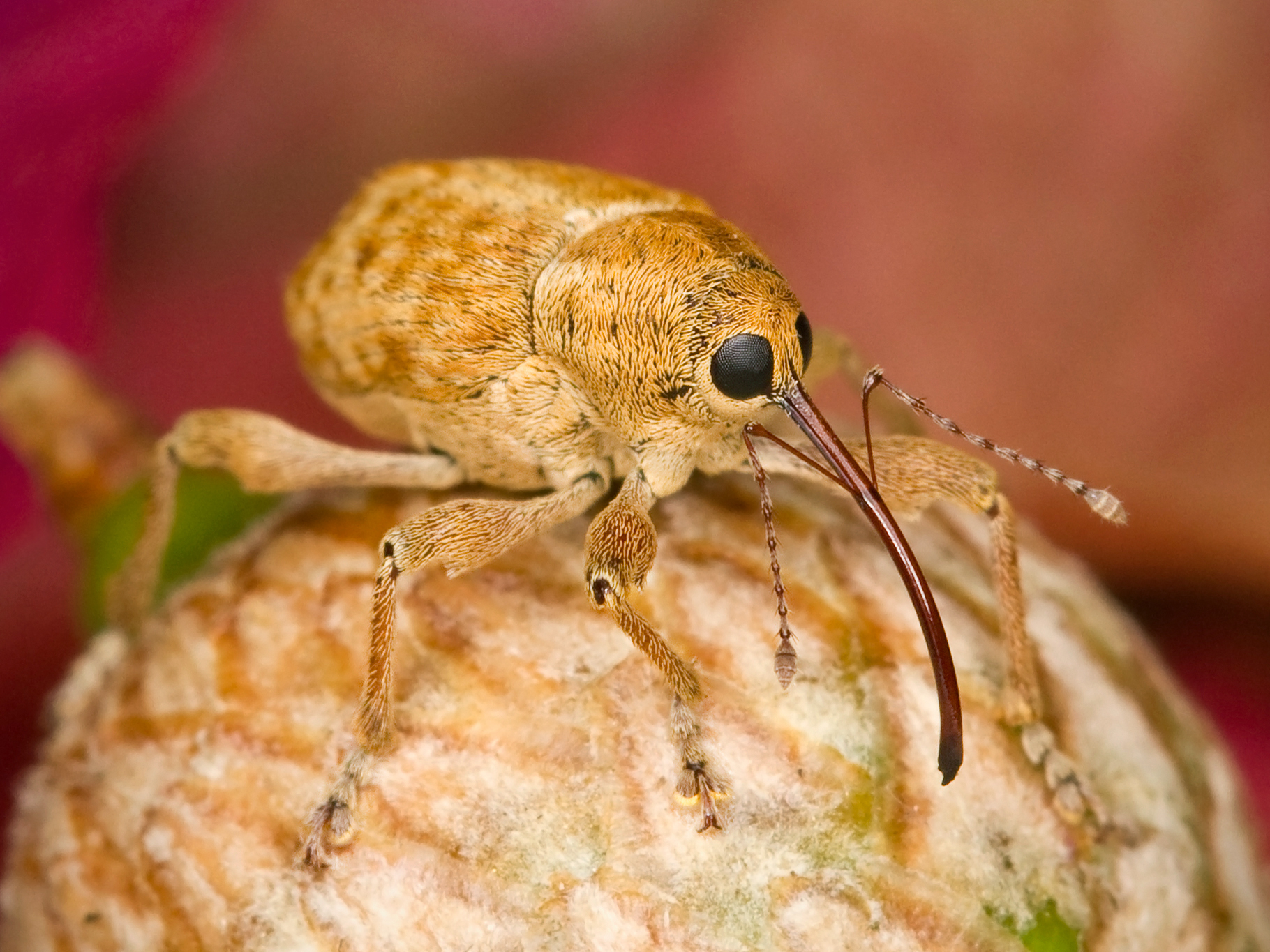
- A filbert weevil (Curculio occidentis) on an acorn cap

Scientific classification
- Kingdom: Animalia
- Phylum: Arthropoda
- Class: Insecta
- Order: Coleoptera
- Suborder: Polyphaga
- Infraorder: Cucujiformia
- Family: Curculionidae
- Subfamily: Curculioninae
- Genus: Curculio; Linnaeus, 1758

Species
- About 30; see text

= Curculio =

Genus of beetles

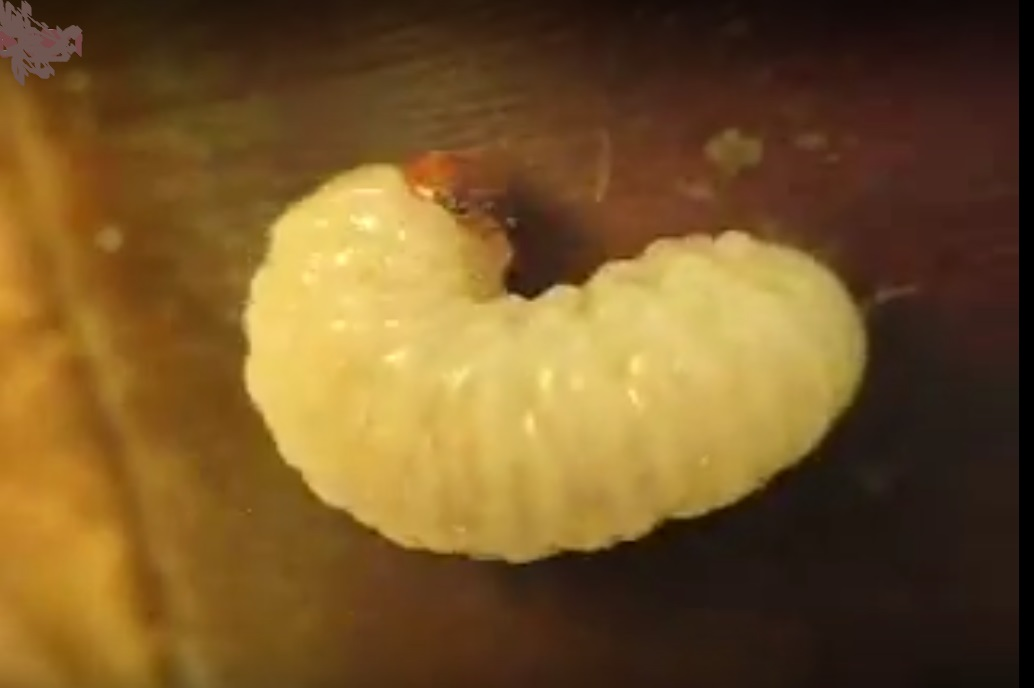
Curculio larva emerging from Chinese chestnut acorn

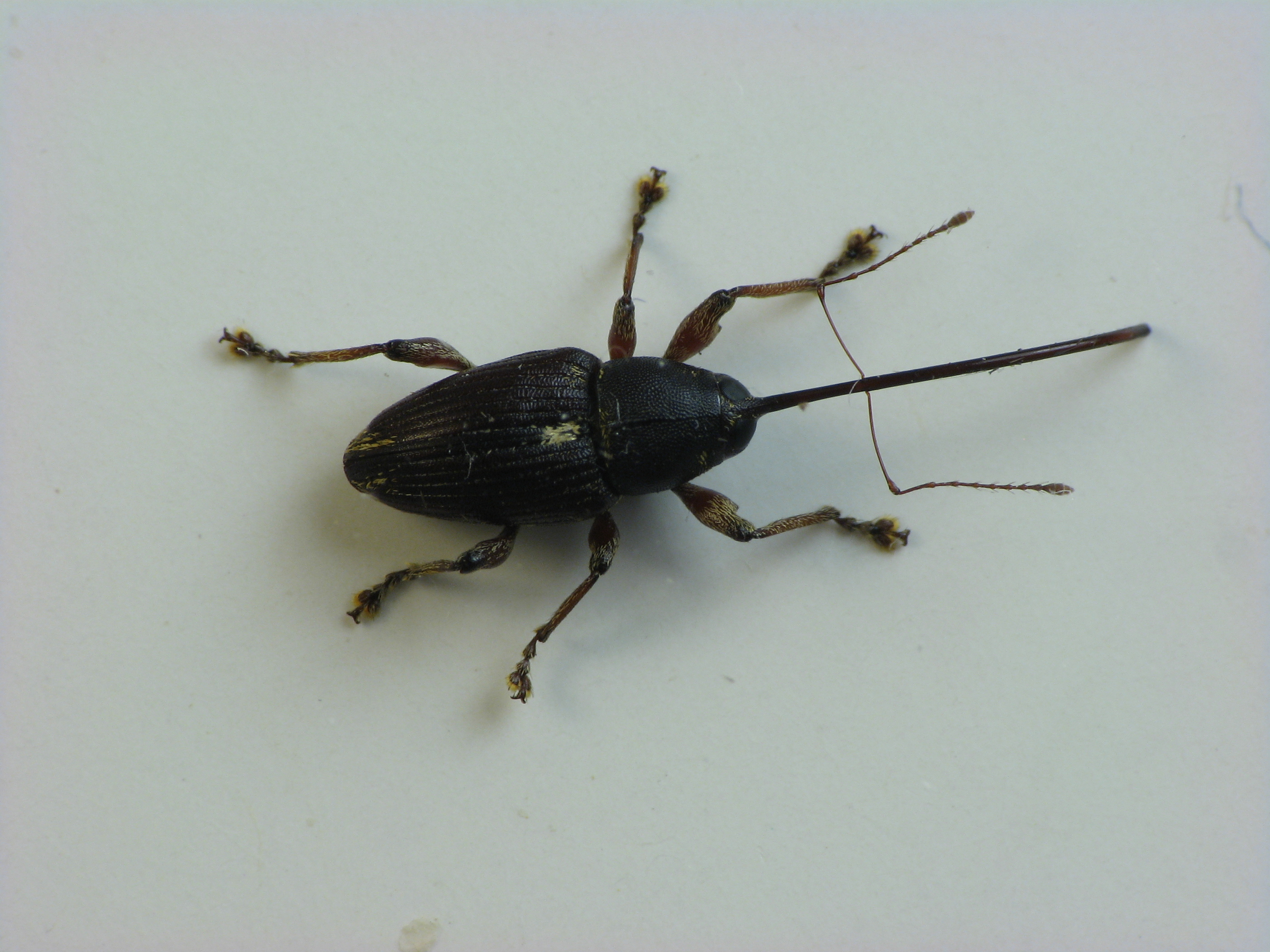
Curculio sayi

Curculio is a genus of weevils belonging to the family Curculionidae and subfamily Curculioninae. Members of the genus are commonly referred to as acorn weevils or nut weevils, as they infest the seeds of trees such as oaks and hickories. The adult female weevil bores a tiny hole in the immature nut to lay her eggs, which then hatch into legless grubs. In autumn, the grubs bore holes through the shells from the inside to emerge into the soil, where they may live for a year or two before maturing into adults.

== Species ==
Species of Curculio include:

- Curculio aurivestis Chittenden, 1927
- Curculio caryae (Horn, 1873) (pecan weevil)
- Curculio caryatrypes (Boheman, 1843)
- Curculio coccineae (Patton, 1897)
- Curculio confusor (Hamilton, 1893)
- Curculio dentipes W.Roelofs, 1874
- Curculio distinguendus Gyllenhal 1834
- Curculio elephas (Gyllenhal 1836) (chestnut weevil)
- Curculio fulvus Chittenden, 1927
- Curculio glandium Marsham, 1802 (acorn weevil)
- Curculio gyongyiae Szénási, 2022
- Curculio humeralis (Casey, 1897)
- Curculio iowensis (Casey, 1910)
- Curculio longidens Chittenden, 1927
- Curculio longinasus Chittenden, 1927
- Curculio macrodon Chittenden, 1927
- Curculio monticola (Casey, 1897)
- Curculio nanulus (Casey, 1897)
- Curculio nasicus (Say, 1831)
- Curculio neocorylus Harrington, 1881
- Curculio nucum Linnaeus, 1758 (nut weevil)
- Curculio obtusus (Blanchard, 1884) (hazelnut weevil)
- Curculio occidentis Casey, T.L., 1897 (filbert weevil)
- Curculio orthorhynchus (Chittenden, 1908)
- Curculio pardalis (Chittenden, 1908)
- Curculio pardus Chittenden, 1927
- Curculio proboscideus Fabricius, 1775
- Curculio quercugriseae (Chittenden, 1908)
- Curculio rubidus Gyllenhal, L. in Schönherr, CJ., 1836
- Curculio rubipililineus Gibson, 1969
- Curculio sayi (Gyllenhal, 1836) (small chestnut weevil)
- Curculio sikkimensis K.M.Heller, 1927
- Curculio strictus (Casey, 1897)
- Curculio sulcatulus (Casey, 1897)
- Curculio timidus (Casey, 1910)
- Curculio uniformis (LeConte, 1857) (filbert weevil)
- Curculio vicetinus (Cussigh, 1989)
- Curculio victoriensis (Chittenden, 1904)
- Curculio wenzeli Chittenden, 1927
