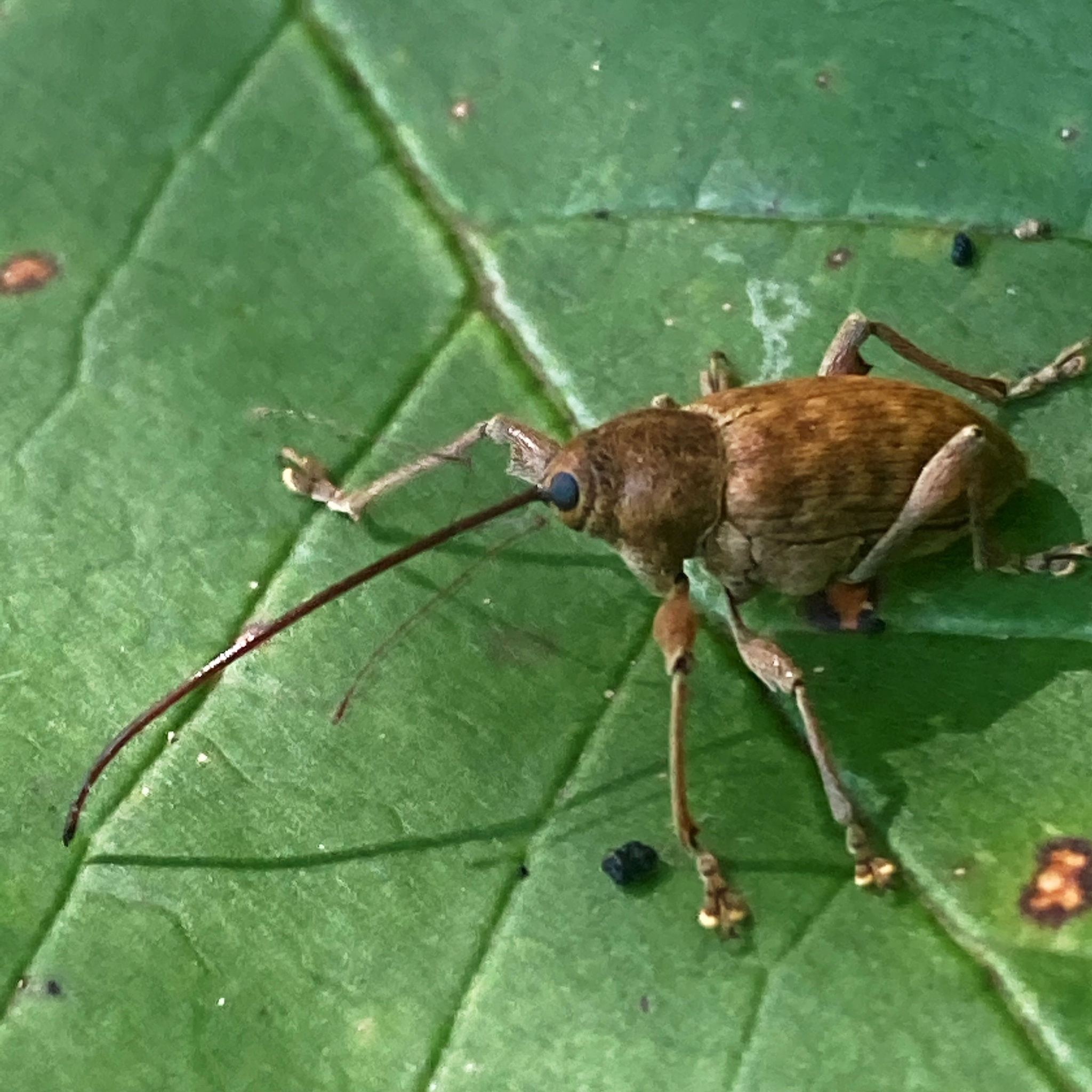

Scientific classification
- Kingdom: Animalia
- Phylum: Arthropoda
- Clade: Pancrustacea
- Class: Insecta
- Order: Coleoptera
- Suborder: Polyphaga
- Infraorder: Cucujiformia
- Superfamily: Curculionoidea
- Family: Curculionidae
- Genus: Curculio
- Species: C. proboscideus

Binomial name
- Curculio proboscideus Fabricius, 1775

Synonyms
- Balaninus cuneatus Casey, 1910; Balaninus nasutus Say, 1831; Balaninus quercus Horn, 1873; Balaninus rectirostris Gyllenhal, 1836; Balaninus rectus Say, 1831; Balaninus rostratus Gyllenhal, 1836; Balaninus sparsellus Casey, 1910

= Large chestnut weevil =

Species of nut weevil

The large chestnut weevil (Curculio proboscideus) is a species of true weevil in the beetle family Curculionidae. It is found in North America.
