= Curculio confusor =

Scientific classification
- Domain: Eukaryota
- Kingdom: Animalia
- Phylum: Arthropoda
- Class: Insecta
- Order: Coleoptera
- Suborder: Polyphaga
- Infraorder: Cucujiformia
- Family: Curculionidae
- Genus: Curculio
- Species: C. confusor

Binomial name
- Curculio confusor (Hamilton, 1893)

Species of beetle

Curculio confusor is a species of true weevil in the beetle family Curculionidae. It is found in North America.
