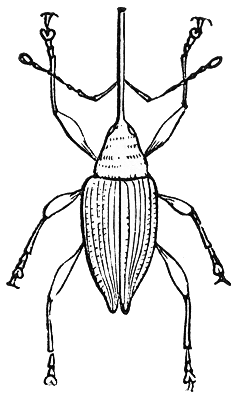

Scientific classification
- Domain: Eukaryota
- Kingdom: Animalia
- Phylum: Arthropoda
- Class: Insecta
- Order: Coleoptera
- Suborder: Polyphaga
- Infraorder: Cucujiformia
- Family: Curculionidae
- Genus: Curculio
- Species: C. nasicus

Binomial name
- Curculio nasicus (Say, 1831)

Synonyms
- Balaninus auctus Casey, 1910; Balaninus ordinatus Casey, 1910

= Curculio nasicus =

Species of beetle

Curculio nasicus is a species of true weevil in the beetle family Curculionidae. It is found in North America.
