= Castanea × neglecta =

Scientific classification
- Kingdom: Plantae
- Clade: Tracheophytes
- Clade: Angiosperms
- Clade: Eudicots
- Clade: Rosids
- Order: Fagales
- Family: Fagaceae
- Genus: Castanea
- Species: C. × neglecta

Binomial name
- Castanea × neglecta Dode

Synonyms
- Castanea margaretta f. dormaniae Ashe

Species of flowering plant

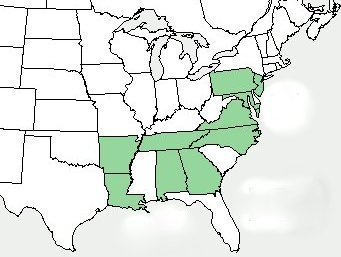
Range map of Castanea x neglecta

Castanea × neglecta, the chinknut, is a named hybrid chestnut tree; it is a cross between Castanea dentata (American chestnut) and Castanea pumila (Allegheny chinquapin). It was first formally named by Louis-Albert Dode in 1908. The chinknut is native to the southeastern United States.
