= Curculio fulvus =

Scientific classification
- Domain: Eukaryota
- Kingdom: Animalia
- Phylum: Arthropoda
- Class: Insecta
- Order: Coleoptera
- Suborder: Polyphaga
- Infraorder: Cucujiformia
- Family: Curculionidae
- Genus: Curculio
- Species: C. fulvus

Binomial name
- Curculio fulvus Chittenden, 1927

Species of beetle

Curculio fulvus is a species of true weevil in the beetle family Curculionidae.
