= Curculio longidens =

Scientific classification
- Domain: Eukaryota
- Kingdom: Animalia
- Phylum: Arthropoda
- Class: Insecta
- Order: Coleoptera
- Suborder: Polyphaga
- Infraorder: Cucujiformia
- Family: Curculionidae
- Genus: Curculio
- Species: C. longidens

Binomial name
- Curculio longidens Chittenden, 1927

Species of beetle

Curculio longidens is a species of snout and bark beetles in the family Curculionidae. It is found in North America.
