= Curculio humeralis =

Scientific classification
- Kingdom: Animalia
- Phylum: Arthropoda
- Class: Insecta
- Order: Coleoptera
- Suborder: Polyphaga
- Infraorder: Cucujiformia
- Family: Curculionidae
- Genus: Curculio
- Species: C. humeralis

Binomial name
- Curculio humeralis (Casey, 1897)

Synonyms
- Balaninus parvidens Chittenden, 1908

Species of beetle

Curculio humeralis is a species of true weevil in the beetle family Curculionidae.
