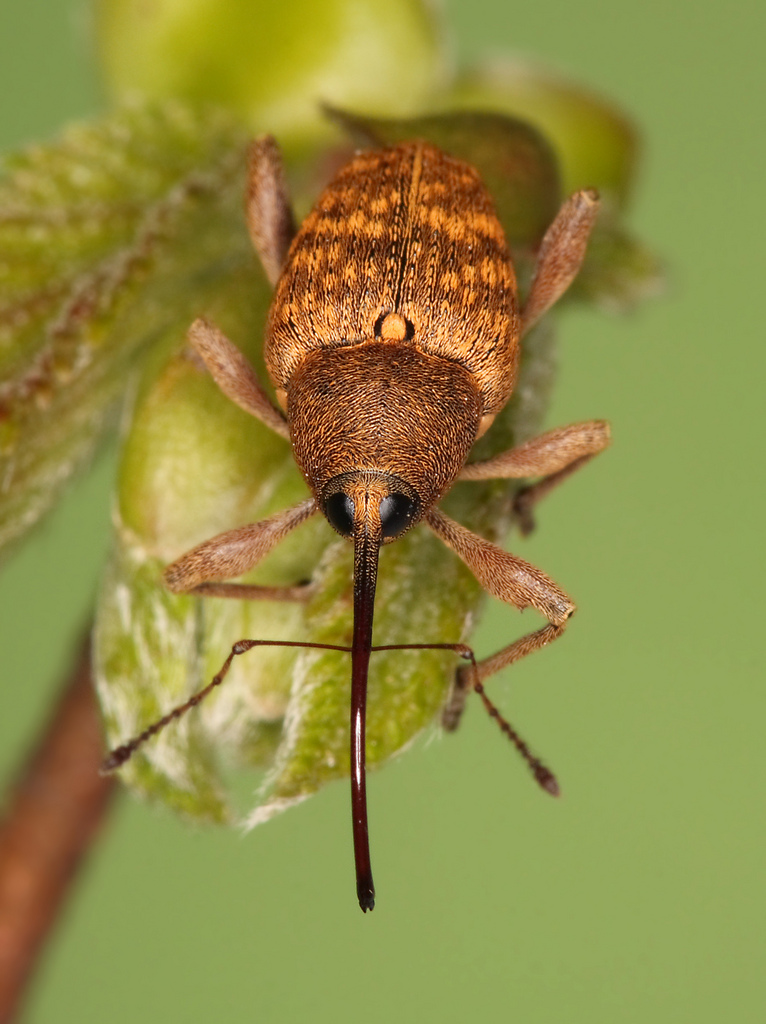

Scientific classification
- Kingdom: Animalia
- Phylum: Arthropoda
- Clade: Pancrustacea
- Class: Insecta
- Order: Coleoptera
- Suborder: Polyphaga
- Infraorder: Cucujiformia
- Superfamily: Curculionoidea
- Family: Curculionidae
- Genus: Curculio
- Species: C. nucum

Binomial name
- Curculio nucum Linnaeus, 1758

= Curculio nucum =

Nut weevil

Species of beetle

Curculio nucum, the nut weevil, is a medium-sized beetle, with an especially elongated snout, characteristic of the Curculionini tribe of the weevil family (Curculionidae). Its larvae develop in hazel nuts Corylus avellana, being a serious pest in hazelnut orchards. It occurs in most of Europe, from south Sweden, Finland and Great Britain to the Mediterranean.

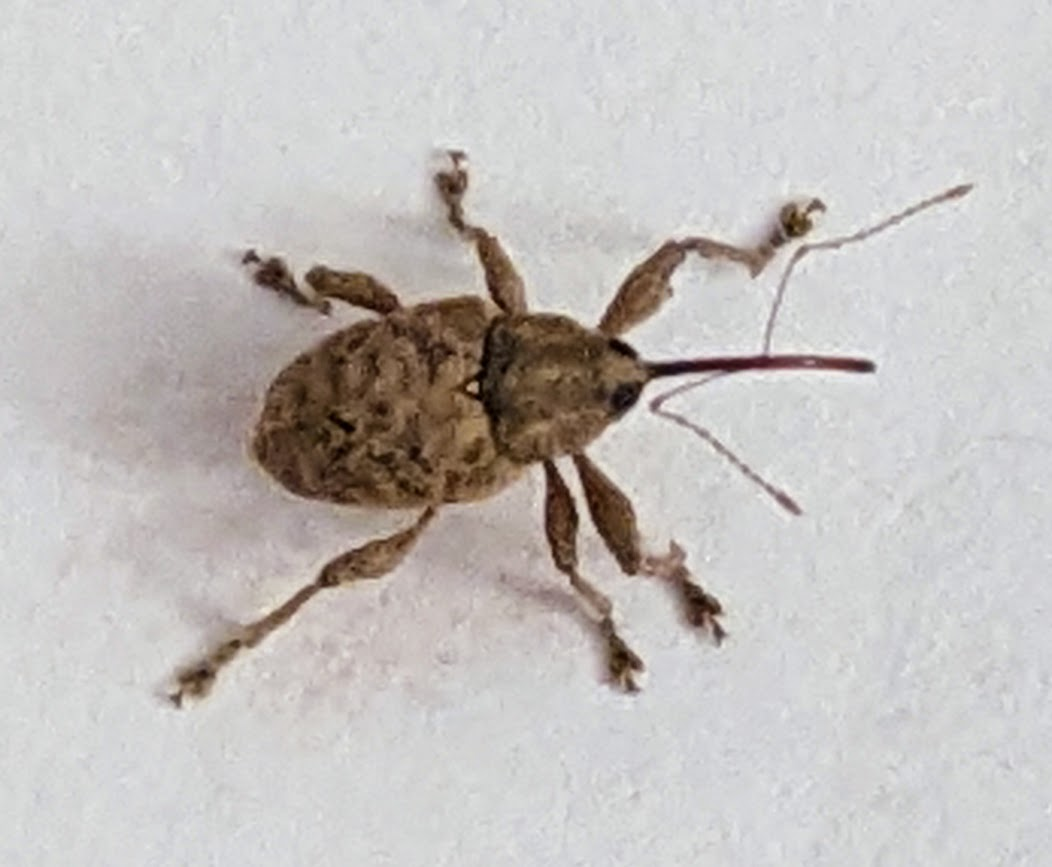
A brown nut-weevil

== Description ==
This weevil ranges from 6 to 8.5 mm. The female's snout is as long as the rest of the body, with a reddish end. The male snout is about 1/3 shorter. The body cover is usually light brown, similar to the colour of mature hazelnuts. This species is often confused with another commonly occurring weevil of the same genera – the gland weevil, Curculio glandium, which lives on oaks. Despite overall similarity, the weevils differ in some morphological details. Curculio nucum has broader segments of flagellum and the segments are covered with semi-erect hairs which in C. glandium are adpressed.

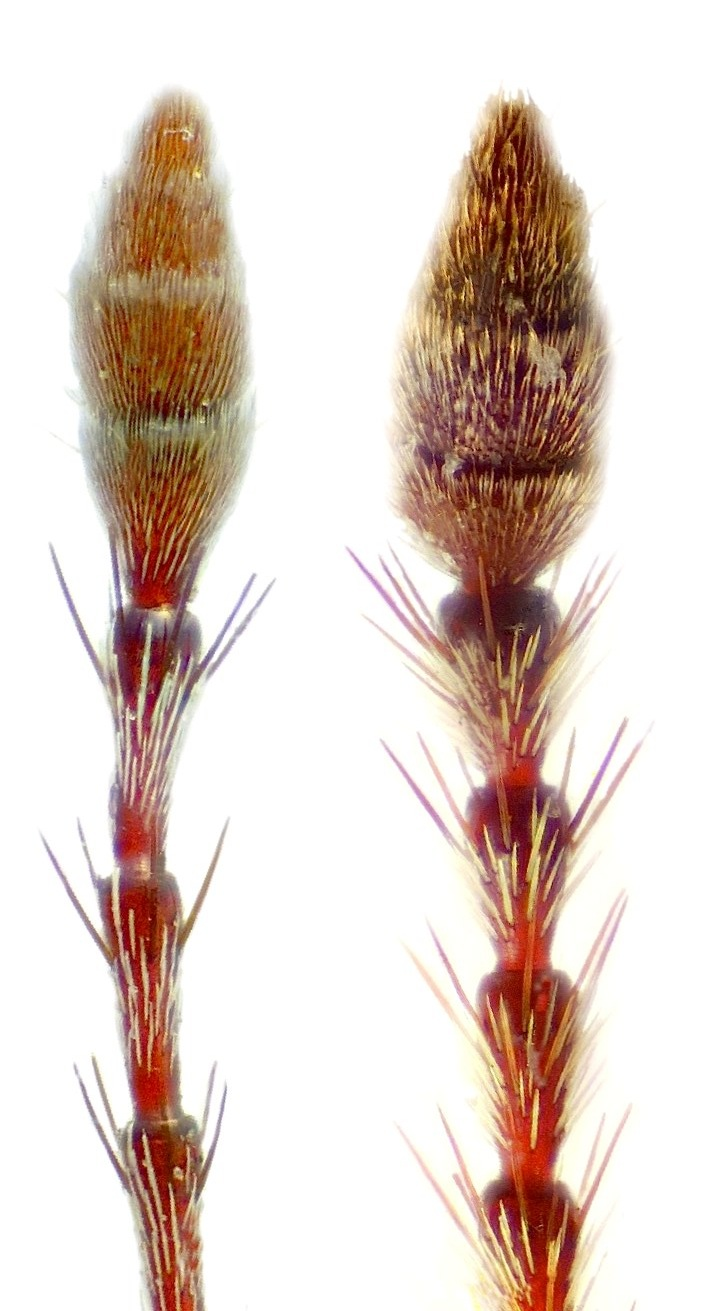
Differences in antennae features of Curculio glandium (left) and C. nucum

Curculio glandium is considered as closely related to C. nucum and as C. undulatus, all of which are grouped together in the "glandium clade". C. cameliae from Japan is also related to this group. Other similar species in Europe that live on oaks, such as Curculio pellitus, C. venosus and C. elephas are gathered in the "elephas clade". Species in the elephas clade have convex elytra and a dense vestiture hiding the line of the first ventral segment, whereas the glandium clade weevils have flattened elytra and the first ventral segment clearly visible through the sparse scales. Tribe Curculionini differs from other weevils, and from other Coleoptera, by the unique cone-shaped mandibles that move vertically instead of horizontally.

== Life cycle ==
Development takes place mostly within a two-year life cycle. Adult beetles emerge in the spring from the soil where they have been overwintering as adult. They feed on hazel buds and leaves. The adults can be found from May to the end of August. Females oviposit within maturing hazelnuts, laying a single, yolk-rich egg per nut, around the end of July/beginning of August. One female can lay up to 20-30 eggs. One week after egg deposition, the larvae hatch and start to feed inside a nut. They spend around one month there, eating most of the nut content. By the end of the summer, mature larvae leave the nuts by round holes then burrow into the ground where they build individual cells. After overwintering, most larvae diapause for the whole season and undergo metamorphosis in the next summer. Newly formed adults then mainly overwinter in their pupal cases before emerging in the spring of the following year. Adult females are reproductively immature at emergence and ovarian development is only attained from 1 to 2 months later, after the feeding period. Small numbers of individuals delay metamorphosis spending more than one winter in the soil. This alternative life story of individuals overwintering more than once may confer additional benefits over a single-year life cycle, such as surviving bad conditions (like lack of host objects). On the other hand, it may increase exposure to predators. Moreover, adult overwintering diapause could be energetically more costly than larval diapause, but could in turn allow adults to be better synchronized with their host plants.

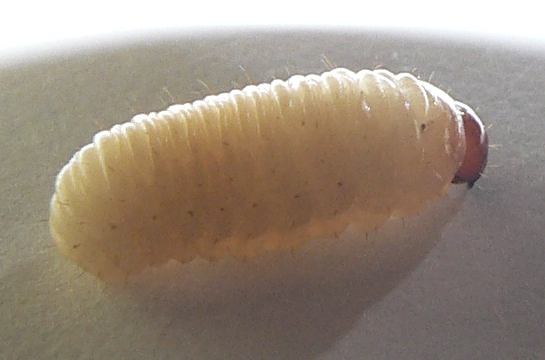
Larva of Curculio nucum

== Infestation and control ==
Inside an infested nut, a cream/white larva with a brown head surrounded by excrement may be found. A hole in a nut shell is a sign that the larvae has already finished feeding, and left the nut, substantially eaten out.

Basic control of this weevil is spraying the orchards with insecticides (containing for example methomyl, thiacloprid, deltamethrin). However, countries producing the greatest crop of nuts, such as Turkey, Italy, France and Spain, are working on alternative methods of control. Some research suggests that it may be possible to use entomopathogenic nematodes such as Heterorhabditis indica. This nematode is deadly to full-grown larvae that inhabit the soil under the tree canopy. The fungus Beauveria bassiana may also be helpful as a control agent. Research in Italy proved that this fungus, if applied into the soil well, kills almost all the larvae. This fungus should be applied when the larvae start to burrow into the soil. According to some investigations, shell thickness is not correlated with the level of weevil damage, but nuts whose shells harden rapidly may be resistant to weevil attack to some extent.
