= Curculio uniformis =

Scientific classification
- Domain: Eukaryota
- Kingdom: Animalia
- Phylum: Arthropoda
- Class: Insecta
- Order: Coleoptera
- Suborder: Polyphaga
- Infraorder: Cucujiformia
- Family: Curculionidae
- Genus: Curculio
- Species: C. uniformis

Binomial name
- Curculio uniformis (LeConte, 1857)

Synonyms
- Balaninus occidentis Casey, 1897

Species of beetle

Curculio uniformis, the filbert weevil, is a species of true weevil in the beetle family Curculionidae.
