= Curculio victoriensis =

Scientific classification
- Domain: Eukaryota
- Kingdom: Animalia
- Phylum: Arthropoda
- Class: Insecta
- Order: Coleoptera
- Suborder: Polyphaga
- Infraorder: Cucujiformia
- Family: Curculionidae
- Genus: Curculio
- Species: C. victoriensis

Binomial name
- Curculio victoriensis (Chittenden, 1904)

Species of beetle

Curculio victoriensis is a species of true weevil in the beetle family Curculionidae. It is found in North America.

== Subspecies ==
These two subspecies belong to the species Curculio victoriensis:

- Curculio victoriensis fulvus Chittenden
- Curculio victoriensis victoriensis
