= Curculio sulcatulus =

Scientific classification
- Kingdom: Animalia
- Phylum: Arthropoda
- Class: Insecta
- Order: Coleoptera
- Suborder: Polyphaga
- Infraorder: Cucujiformia
- Family: Curculionidae
- Genus: Curculio
- Species: C. sulcatulus

Binomial name
- Curculio sulcatulus (Casey, 1897)

Synonyms
- Balaninus baculi Chittenden, 1908; Balaninus curtus Chittenden, 1908; Curculio striatus Chittenden, 1927

Species of beetle

Curculio sulcatulus is a species of snout or bark beetle in the family Curculionidae. It is found in North America.
