= Curculio pardus =

Scientific classification
- Domain: Eukaryota
- Kingdom: Animalia
- Phylum: Arthropoda
- Class: Insecta
- Order: Coleoptera
- Suborder: Polyphaga
- Infraorder: Cucujiformia
- Family: Curculionidae
- Genus: Curculio
- Species: C. pardus

Binomial name
- Curculio pardus Chittenden, 1927

Synonyms
- Curculio cervulinus Chittenden, 1927

Species of beetle

Curculio pardus is a species of true weevil in the beetle family Curculionidae. It is found in North America.
