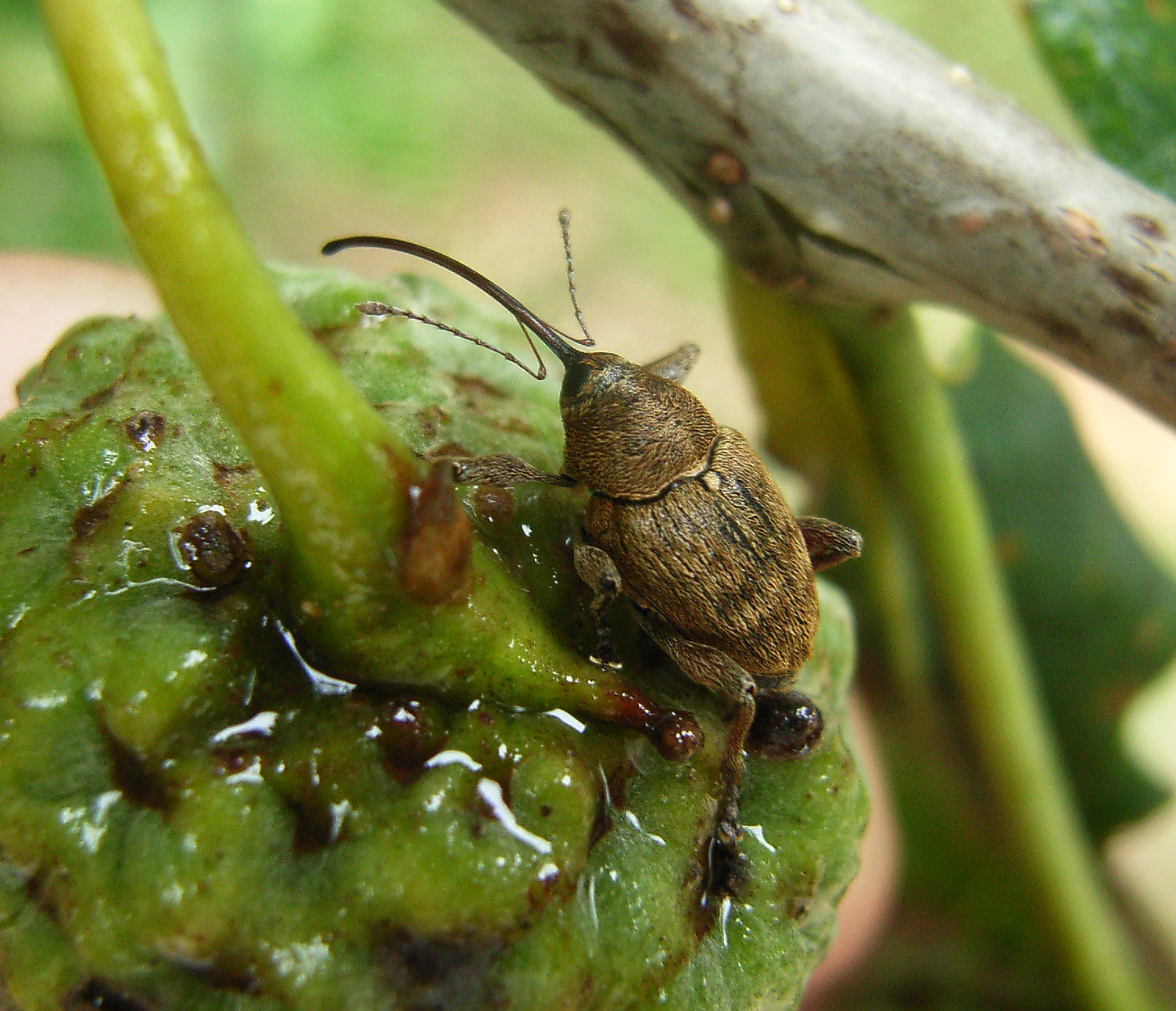

Scientific classification
- Kingdom: Animalia
- Phylum: Arthropoda
- Clade: Pancrustacea
- Class: Insecta
- Order: Coleoptera
- Suborder: Polyphaga
- Infraorder: Cucujiformia
- Superfamily: Curculionoidea
- Family: Curculionidae
- Genus: Curculio
- Species: C. glandium

Binomial name
- Curculio glandium Marsham, 1802

= Curculio glandium =

Species of weevil

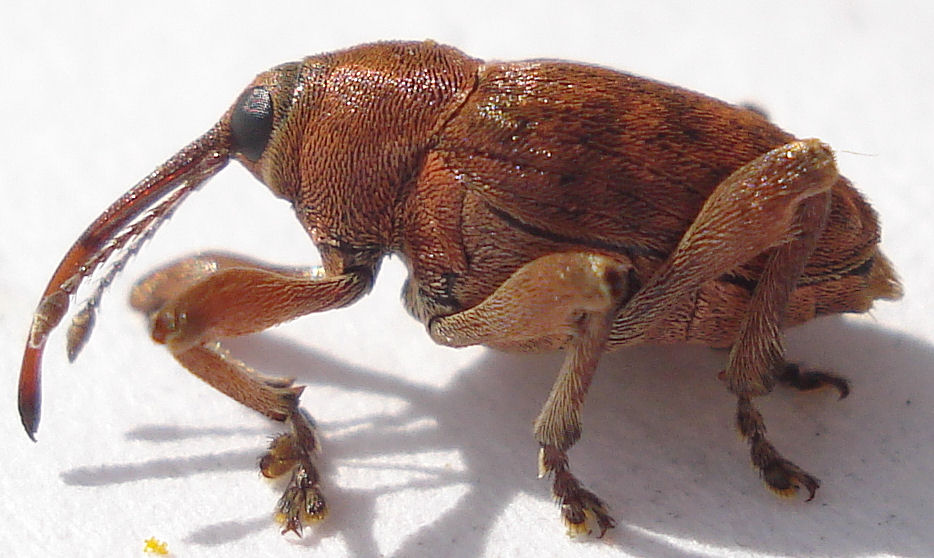
Adult

Curculio glandium, commonly known as the acorn weevil, is a species of European carpophagus weevil in the genus Curculio, the acorn and nut weevils. It eats by a rostrum, an elongated snout, that is used for piercing.

== Description ==
Curculio glandium is a member of the genus Curculio, which comprises seed beetles. All members of Curculio have characteristically long rostrums and ovipositors, an adaptation that specifically developed by their reliance on seeds for food and reproduction.

Male/female differentiation can be determined using the rostrum as the female's is longer. In female acorn weevils, their rostrums are around the size of their body or larger, while males have a rostrum around two thirds of that size. The larvae are short, and cylindrical in shape, and move by means of ridges on the underside of the body. Adults can reach a length of 4 to 8 mm (0.16 to 0.31 in).

== Life cycle ==
Curculio glandium eggs are deposited in acorns by the adult weevil chewing channels into the fruit. The eggs are then released using an ovipositor, a long, narrow organ featured in female weevils. These do not reach the acorn's embryo and are healed by the plant, sealing the holes and protecting the eggs from parasites. Upon hatching, either one or two larvae consume the fruit. While they may eat the entirety of the acorn, the larvae typically do not consume the embryo itself. After the acorn drops to the ground, Curculio glandium larvae emerge from the acorn and burrow into the soil, where they live for 1-2 years before pupating and emerging as adults. The larvae are freeze avoidant, preventing their internal body fluids from freezing during the winter.

== Ecology ==
Curculio glandium can pose a large risk to acorn-bearing tree populations. They are highly effective at infecting acorns which can cause a widespread number of seeds to be incapable of germination, with a potential of rendering 70–90% of seeds incapable of germination.
