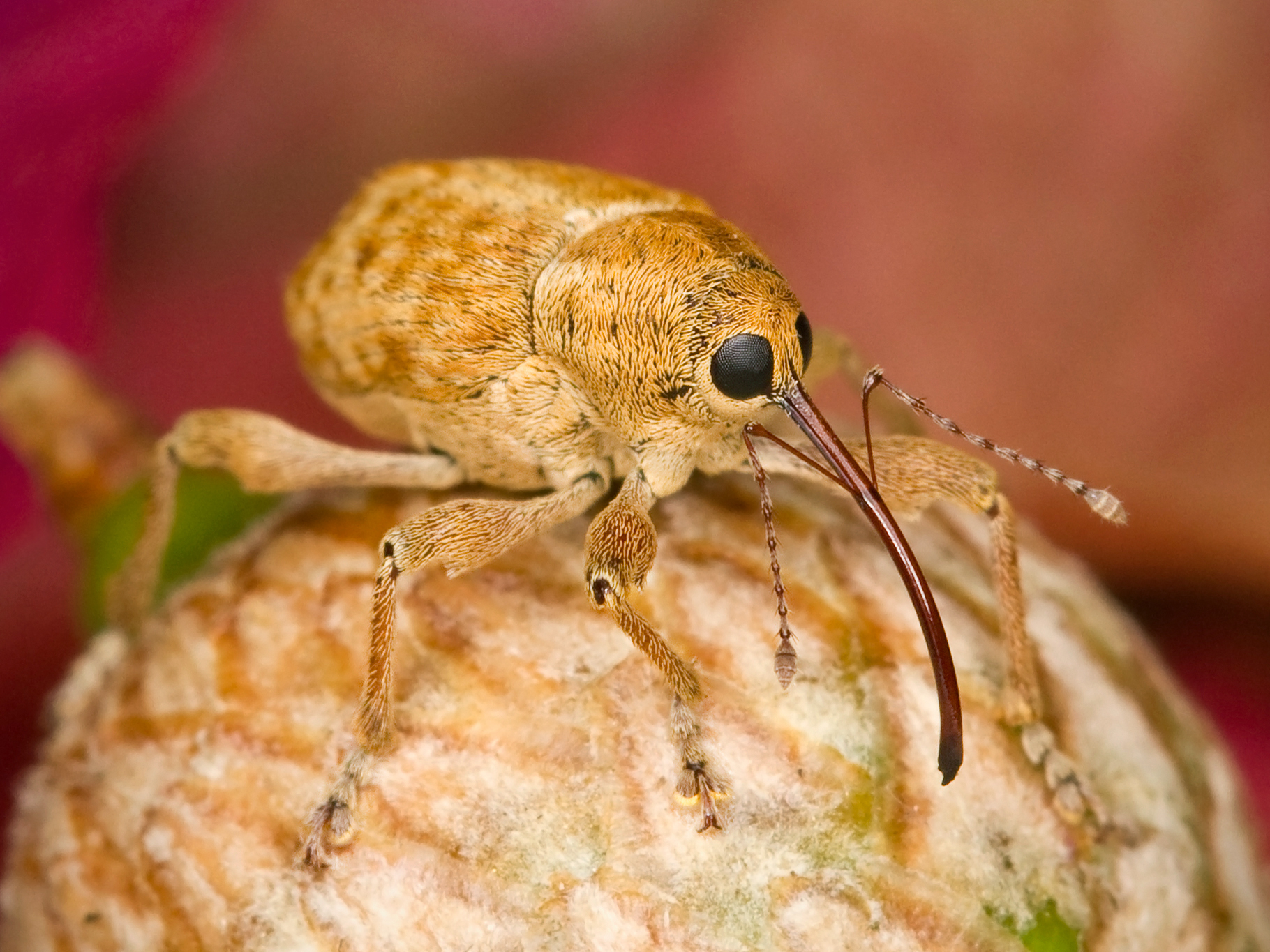
- A filbert weevil (Curculio occidentis) on an acorn cap

Scientific classification
- Kingdom: Animalia
- Phylum: Arthropoda
- Class: Insecta
- Order: Coleoptera
- Suborder: Polyphaga
- Infraorder: Cucujiformia
- Family: Curculionidae
- Genus: Curculio
- Species: C. occidentis

Binomial name
- Curculio occidentis Linnaeus, 1758

= Curculio occidentis =

Filbert weevil

Species of beetle

Curculio occidentis, the filbert weevil, is a species of weevil in the genus Curculio. The weevils are considered a pest for many species of oak tree due to the damage they cause to acorns.

== Distribution ==
Curculio occidentis is native to the western side of North America. Its range includes British Columbia in Canada, California, Arizona, New Mexico and Utah in the United States, and Mexico.

== Ecology ==
The female Curculio occidentis lays small batches of two to four eggs in a developing acorn. The resulting larvae feed on the kernel and when fully developed, tunnel out of the nut, fall to the ground and dig themselves a small soil chamber. They may wait one or two years before pupating. In infestation damage research, Quercus garryana acorns were collected in 1996, 1997 (low crop years) and in 1998 (high crop year). Researchers concluded that levels of infestation did not vary with crown level during the low crop years but varied during the high crop year. During the high crop year, weeviled acorns were more present at the lower portion of the tree than the upper part of the tree.

Together with larva of the filbertworm moth (Cydia latiferreana), the filbert weevil feeds on the acorns of several species of oak tree. In British Columbia, up to 66% of acorns from garry oak (Quercus garryana) were infected with these larvae. Affected acorns are still able to germinate, but the germination rate is lower than for uninfected nuts.
