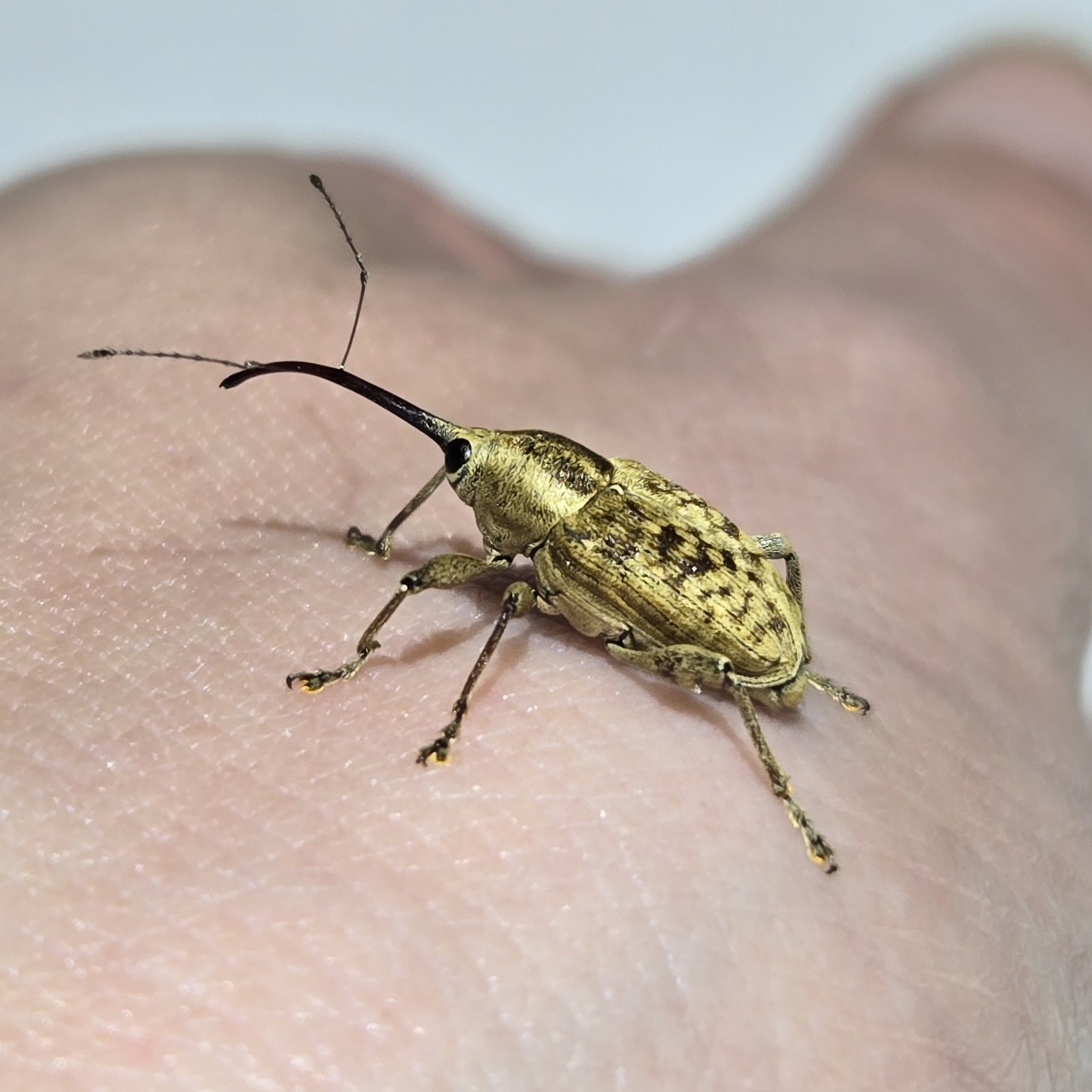

Scientific classification
- Kingdom: Animalia
- Phylum: Arthropoda
- Clade: Pancrustacea
- Class: Insecta
- Order: Coleoptera
- Suborder: Polyphaga
- Infraorder: Cucujiformia
- Superfamily: Curculionoidea
- Family: Curculionidae
- Genus: Curculio
- Species: C. caryatrypes

Binomial name
- Curculio caryatrypes C.H.Boheman, 1843

= Curculio caryatrypes =

Species of weevil

Curculio caryatrypes, the greater chestnut weevil, is a species of weevil in the family Curculionidae.

A specialist on the American chestnut, the species was thought to be extinct following the functional extinction of its host. However, it was rediscovered via the community science platform iNaturalist in 2022 on a close relative of the American chestnut, the Allegheny chinquapin.
