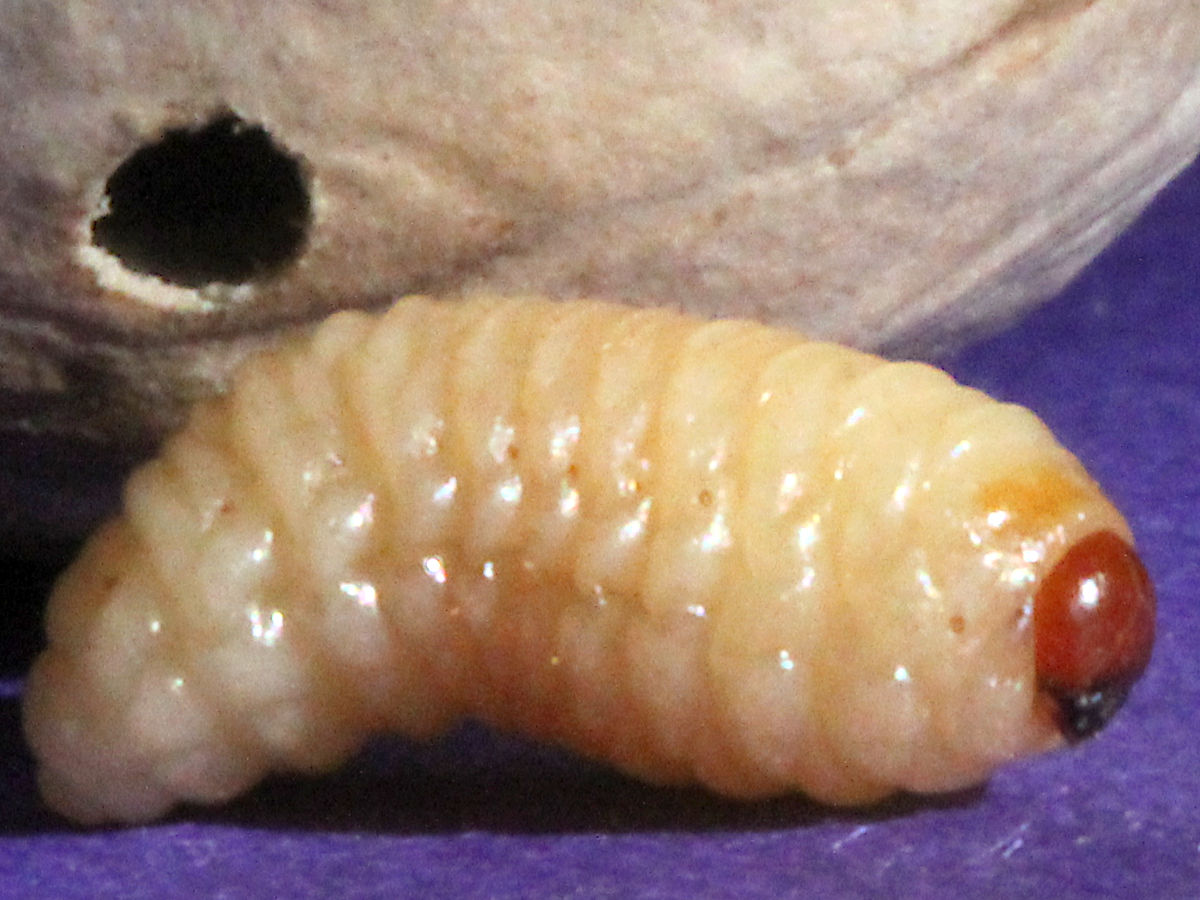
- Grub

Scientific classification
- Kingdom: Animalia
- Phylum: Arthropoda
- Clade: Pancrustacea
- Class: Insecta
- Order: Coleoptera
- Suborder: Polyphaga
- Infraorder: Cucujiformia
- Family: Curculionidae
- Genus: Curculio
- Species: C. caryae

Binomial name
- Curculio caryae G. H. Horn, 1873

= Curculio caryae =

Species of beetle

The pecan weevil, Curculio caryae (Coleoptera: Curculionidae) is an obligate feeder on the nuts of North American hickories and pecans (Carya species), most widely recognized as an economically important pest of the pecan, Carya illinoinensis (Fagales: Juglandaceae). It has also been observed to infest one Juglans species, the Persian walnut, Juglans regia.

Adult pecan weevils are approximately 3/8 inch (9.5 mm) long, medium-brown beetles with a proboscis of equal length to their body, which has mouthparts at the distal end. The females use their proboscis to chew a hole through the husk of developing nuts and deposit eggs inside, which hatch into legless, creamy-white larvae with reddish-brown head capsules that feed inside the nuts from late summer through fall, developing through several instars up to 3/5 in (15 mm) long at full growth. In late fall and early winter, mature larvae chew a small hole in the nut shell and drop to the ground, where they burrow into the soil and construct a cell in which they remain for eight to ten months before pupating and transforming into adults. Newly formed adults remain in their cells in the soil and emerge the following year, two years after the beginning of the cycle, although some larvae do not pupate and transform to adults until an additional year has passed and the life cycle for some of each generation may take up to three years.

Their economic importance results from crop loss due to their feeding and egg laying on the developing pecan nuts causing them to drop from the tree, and the destruction of the edible nut kernel by the larvae feeding inside the shell.

== Genomics ==
A chromosome-level genome assembly of Curculio caryae was published in 2026. The genome size is approximately 2.169 Gb and is assembled into 13 chromosomes. The assembly has a BUSCO completeness of 95.4%, and 19,508 protein-coding genes were predicted. This represents the first published genome for the genus Curculio.
