= Curculio obtusus =

Scientific classification
- Kingdom: Animalia
- Phylum: Arthropoda
- Class: Insecta
- Order: Coleoptera
- Suborder: Polyphaga
- Infraorder: Cucujiformia
- Family: Curculionidae
- Genus: Curculio
- Species: C. obtusus

Binomial name
- Curculio obtusus (Blanchard, 1884)

Synonyms
- Curculio neocorylus Gibson, 1969

Species of beetle

Curculio obtusus, the hazelnut weevil, is a species of true weevil in the beetle family Curculionidae. It is found in North America.
