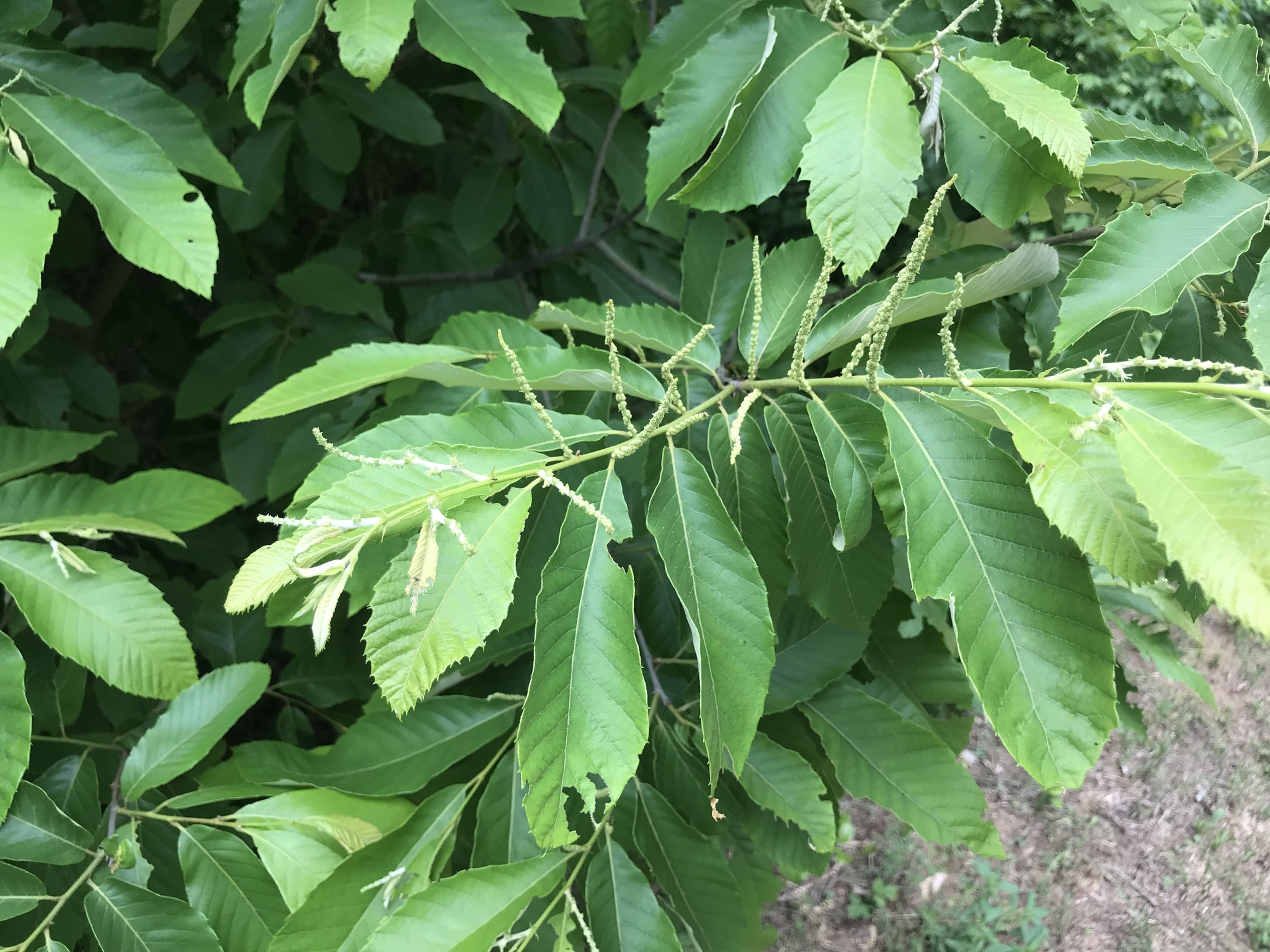
- Leaves and flowers of Allegheny chinquapin

Conservation status
- Least Concern (IUCN 3.1)

- Secure (NatureServe)

Scientific classification
- Kingdom: Plantae
- Clade: Tracheophytes
- Clade: Angiosperms
- Clade: Eudicots
- Clade: Rosids
- Order: Fagales
- Family: Fagaceae
- Genus: Castanea
- Species: C. pumila

Binomial name
- Castanea pumila Mill.
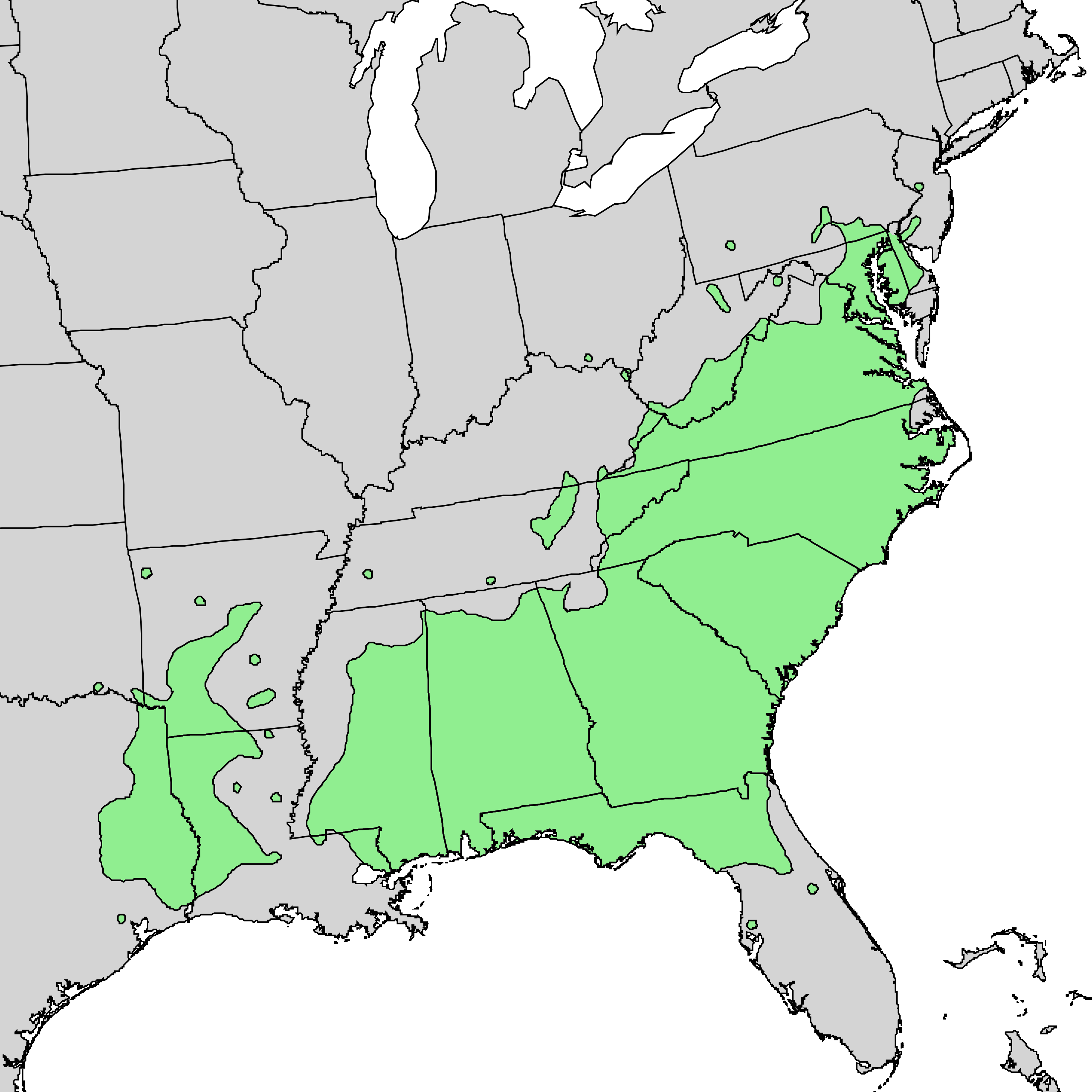
- Natural range

Synonyms
- List: Castanea alnifolia Nutt.; Castanea alnifolia subsp. floridana (Sarg.) A.E.Murray; Castanea alnifolia var. floridana Sarg.; Castanea alnifolia var. pubescens Nutt.; Castanea chincapin K.Koch; Castanea floridana (Sarg.) Ashe; Castanea floridana var. angustifolia (Ashe) Ashe; Castanea floridana var. arcuata (Ashe) Ashe; Castanea floridana var. margaretta (Ashe) Ashe; Castanea margaretta (Ashe) Ashe; Castanea margaretta var. angustifolia Ashe; Castanea margaretta var. arcuata Ashe; Castanea nana Muhl.; Castanea paucispina Ashe; Castanea pumila subsp. ashei (Sudw.) A.E.Murray; Castanea pumila var. ashei Sudw.; Castanea pumila var. margaretta Ashe; Castanea pumila var. nana (Muhl.) A.DC.; Fagus nana Du Roi ex Steud.; Fagus pumila L.

= Castanea pumila =

Allegheny chinquapin

Species of tree

Castanea pumila, commonly known as the Allegheny chinquapin, American chinquapin (from the Powhatan) or dwarf chestnut, is a species of chestnut native to the southeastern United States. The native range is from Massachusetts and New York to Maryland and extreme southern New Jersey and southeast Pennsylvania south to central Florida, west to eastern Texas, and north to southern Missouri and Kentucky. The plant's habitat is dry sandy and rocky uplands and ridges mixed with oak and hickory to 1000 m elevation. It grows best on well-drained soils in full sun or partial shade. Allegheny chinquapin is relatively resistant to chestnut blight compared to the closely-related American chestnut.

== Description ==
It is a spreading shrub or small tree, reaching 2–8 m (6 ft 7 in – 26 ft 3 in) in height at maturity. The bark is red- or gray-brown and slightly furrowed into scaly plates. The leaves are simple, alternately arranged, narrowly elliptical or lanceolate, yellow-green above and paler and finely hairy on the underside. Each leaf is 7.5–15 cm (3–5 7/8 in) long by 3–5 cm (1 1/4–2 in) wide with parallel side veins ending in short pointed teeth. The flowers of this monoecious plant appear in early summer. Male flowers are small and pale yellow to white, borne on erect catkins 10–15 cm (4–6 in) long attached to the base of each leaf. Female flowers are 3 mm (0.12 in) long and are located at the base of some catkins. The fruit is a golden-colored cupule 2–3 cm (3/4–1 1/4 in) in diameter with many sharp spines, maturing in autumn. Each cupule contains one ovoid shiny dark brown nut that is edible.

A natural hybrid of Castanea pumila and Castanea dentata has been named Castanea × neglecta.

== Habitat ==
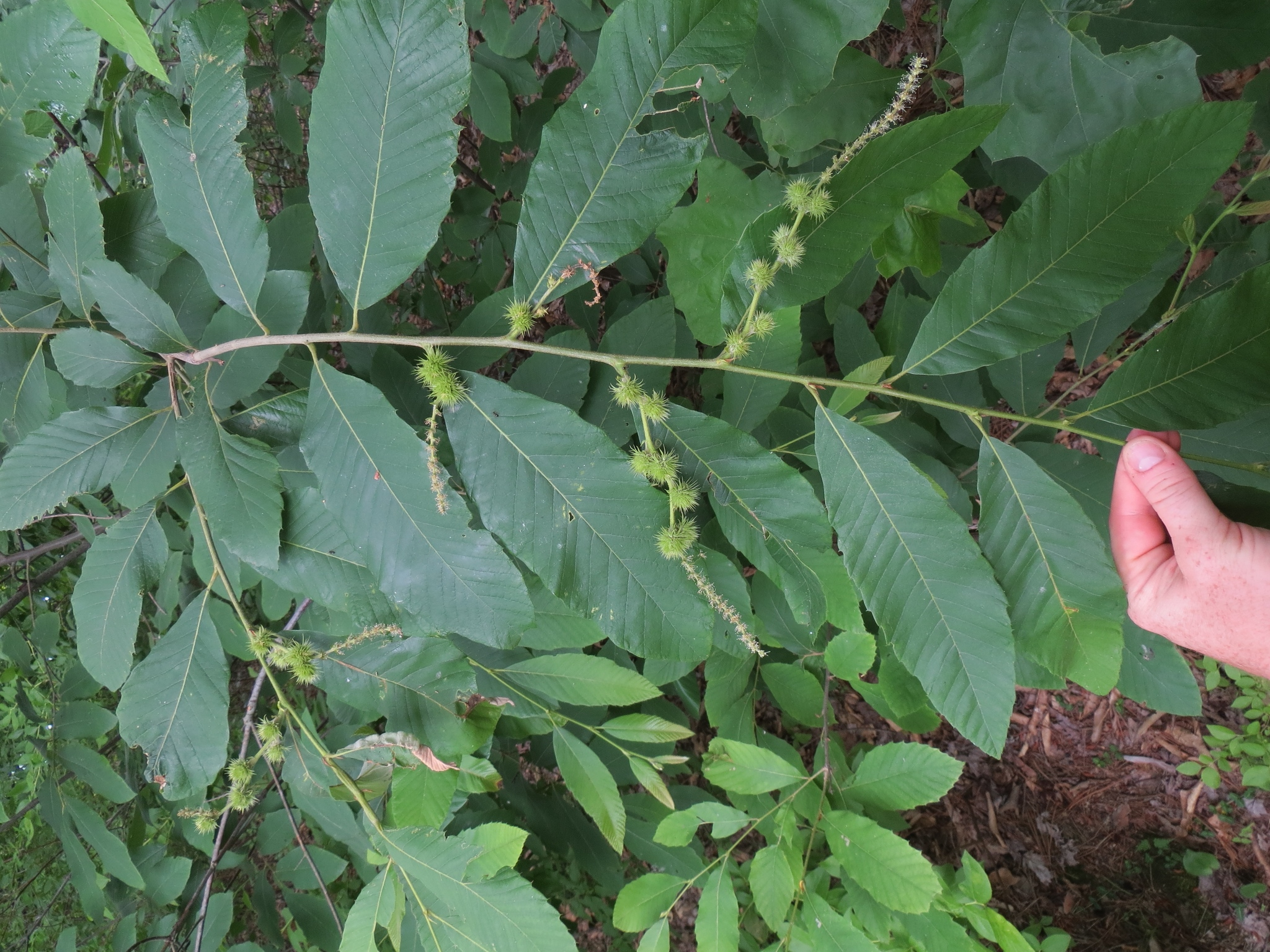
Leaves and immature nuts of Allegheny chinquapin.

Allegheny chinquapin occurs in a variety of forest types and woodlands, including dry pinelands, old fields, pine plantations, and well-drained stream terraces. Allegheny chinquapin is closely related to the American chestnut, Castanea dentata, and both trees can be found in the same habitat. Allegheny chinquapin can be distinguished by its smaller nut (half the size of a chestnut) that is not flattened (chestnuts are flattened on one side). The leaves of the Allegheny chinquapin are smaller than the American chestnut and have less distinct teeth. Allegheny chinquapin, however, is less susceptible to the chestnut blight fungus that devastated the American chestnut. While the chinquapin does blight to some degree, it continues to send out suckers that will produce fruit. Chinquapins are quite vulnerable nevertheless, and there are many reports of heavily diseased and cankered trees.

== Uses ==
John Smith of Jamestown made the first written record of the tree and its nuts in 1612, observing its use by the Native Americans. Native Americans made an infusion of chinquapin leaves to relieve headaches and fevers. The bark, leaves, wood, and seed husks of the plant contain tannin. The nuts can be blanched, dried, and rehydrated to be prepared as food. The wood is hard and durable and is sometimes used in fences and fuel, but the plant is too small for the wood to be of commercial importance.

Chinquapins are used in landscapes for the purpose of attracting wildlife. When the base of the plant is cut or wounded at ground level the plant will grow multiple stalks producing a thick cover used by turkeys. The nuts are consumed by squirrels and rabbits while white-tailed deer graze upon the foliage.
