= Amphilogia gyrosa =

Scientific classification
- Kingdom: Fungi
- Division: Ascomycota
- Class: Sordariomycetes
- Order: Diaporthales
- Family: Cryphonectriaceae
- Genus: Amphilogia
- Species: A. gyrosa

Binomial name
- Amphilogia gyrosa (Berk. & Broome) Gryzenh., H.F.Glen & M.J.Wingf. (2005)

Synonyms
- Nectria gyrosa Berk. & Broome (1876); Cucurbitaria gyrosa (Berk. & Broome) Kuntze (1898); Cryphonectria gyrosa (Berk. & Broome) Sacc. & D.Sacc. (1905); Endothia gyrosa (Berk. & Broome) Höhn. (1909) nom. illeg.; Endothia tropicalis Shear & N.E.Stevens (1917)

Species of fungus

Amphilogia gyrosa is a species of sac fungus in the family Cryphonectriaceae. It is the type species for the genus Amphilogia. It was described from Sri Lanka but has been found on hinau, Elaeocarpus hookerianus and Elaeocarpus glandulifer trees in New Zealand. Until a revision in 2005, the species was classified in the genus Cryphonectria. This species has been confused in the literature with Endothia gyrosa but is morphologically and phylogenetically distinct.
