= Rostraureum tropicale =

Scientific classification
- Domain: Eukaryota
- Kingdom: Fungi
- Division: Ascomycota
- Class: Sordariomycetes
- Order: Diaporthales
- Family: Cryphonectriaceae
- Genus: Rostraureum
- Species: R. tropicale

Binomial name
- Rostraureum tropicale Gryzenh. & M.J.Wingf. (2005)

Species of fungus

Rostraureum tropicale is a species of fungus from genus Rostraureum that is found in Ecuador.

== Distribution and habitat ==
Rostraureum tropicale is a pathogen of Terminalia ivorensis and causes basal stem cankers on dying trees. The fungus is distributed in the lowland tropics of Ecuador. Hosts include Terminalia ivorensis and Terminalia superba (both in family Combretaceae of the Myrtales).

== Morphology ==
Morphologically, Rostraureum tropicale has characteristics similar to those for Cryphonectria, Endothia and Chrysoporthe, but appears to be superficially closest to Cryphonectria longirostris. The fungus displays characteristics typical of diaporthalean fungi, with periphysate ostiolar canals with no paraphyses, and asci are unitunicate with refractive apical rings. Fruiting structures are orange to yellow, and ascospores are one-septate and fusoid to ellipsoid.

Rostraureum tropicale can be distinguished from Endothia, Cryphonectria and Chrysoporthe by the observation that perithecial necks are not embedded in well-developed stromatic tissue. Additionally, it can be distinguished from Chrysoporthe by the presence of orange perithecial necks instead of fuscous-black necks.

== Phylogeny ==
Rostraureum tropicale is phylogenetically most closely related to species of Endothia, based on ribosomal (ITS) and β-tubulin DNA sequences. However, species of Chrysoporthe and Cryphonectria belong to the same superclade and are thus closely related to Rostraureum tropicale.

== Pathogenicity ==
Rostraureum tropicale is pathogenic towards Terminalia ivorensis and a closely related host, Terminalia superba, causing well-developed stem cankers within six weeks of inoculation. It is also more pathogenic than Chrysoporthe cubensis, which causes smaller lesions on Terminalia superba. However, C. cubensis is not usually a pathogen of trees in the Combretaceae.
