= Viral biological control =

Use of viruses for pest control

Viral biological control is the implementation of viruses to control or deplete pest populations. Viruses have high host specificity allowing targeted infections that are unlikely to impact other organisms. Viral biological control methods are studied and used globally, for sustainable agricultural practices, controlling invasive species, and disease management in humans and food. Viral biological control is heavily researched as alternative methods to chemical pest control methods, as viruses are made from natural genetic material and will biodegrade. Whereas researchers are using viruses as a selective control protocol when targeting invasive species. Bacteriophages are being implemented and explored to combat diseases and food borne diseases.

== History ==
Viral biological control methods may have been studied as early as 2700 BC in China for pest control management for silkworms. However, the earliest documented case of viral pest control was recorded in the late 1800s and early 1900s. The first use of viruses for insect pest management occurred in 1892 when nuclear polyhedrosis viruses were released in Germany to protect pine trees from Lymantria monacha, Black arches. Virus implementations as pesticides have been studied around the world as pests are a global issue impacting all types of terrains, climates, and organisms. In 1896, the first findings of bacteriophage, bacterial viruses, and antibacterial elements were in the Ganges and Jumna rivers in India; scientists took note of the decline in Vibrio cholerae, cholera, and later identified Utilization of bacteriophages, for combating bacterial infections of plants was documented in 1924 when scientists Mallman and Hemstreet, discovered a liquid secreted by cabbage preventing rot from Xanthomonas campretris, Black rot. The following year, scientists Kotila and Coons isolated phages directed against Pectrobactrium carotovorum, Blackleg disease, in potatoes. In the early 1960s, after beginning research in the 1950s, scientists in China utilized multiple viruses, including for Agrotis segetum and Apamea sordens, to target insect pests, to protect agriculture, pastures, and gardens. The first usage of viruses as biological pest control in the United States was in 1970 when viral-based insecticides were used to deplete the population of Helicoverpa armigera, Cotton Bollworm, a voracious moth that eats cotton and other crops.

== Animals ==
Invasive animals are a global issue causing ecological damage and filling niches of indigenous species. Utilizing viruses to control animal population reduces invasive populations and reduces animal vectors for diseases.

=== Insects ===
Insects are the main vectors for spreading diseases for all organisms. Insect vectors disperse pathogens through their travel, direct contact, and interaction with organisms. In China, over 32 virus species are implemented for biological control to uphold agriculture, forestry, and domestic areas in China, and have a .2% prevalence in China’s overall insecticide protocols. These insect viruses, include Helicoverpa armigera nucleopolyhedrovirus, Mamestra brassicae nucleopolyhedrovirus, Sprodoptera litura nucleopolyhedrovirus, and Periplaneta fuliginosa densovirus, and many of these viruses were genetically altered to increase infection rate and resistant to UV-light, a main obstacle as most viruses are UV-light sensitive. Various species of Lepidoptera such as Spodoptera exempta, the African armyworm, and Lymantria dispar dispar, the gypsy moth; both have higher reproduction rates and have sporadic outbreaks causing ecological destruction. They found Spodoptera exempta are most susceptible to neuropolyhedrovirues at the larvae stage, and the virus can be transmitted both horizontally and vertically, remaining latent until sudden expression of the virus. Triggers to the expression or infection of the virus in case of vertical transmission remain unknown. Similar studies found neuropolyhedrovirues to affect Spodoptera exempta, aiding in large outbreaks, but noted high tannin levels, a chemical found in woody plants, reduced viral virulence.

=== Mammals ===
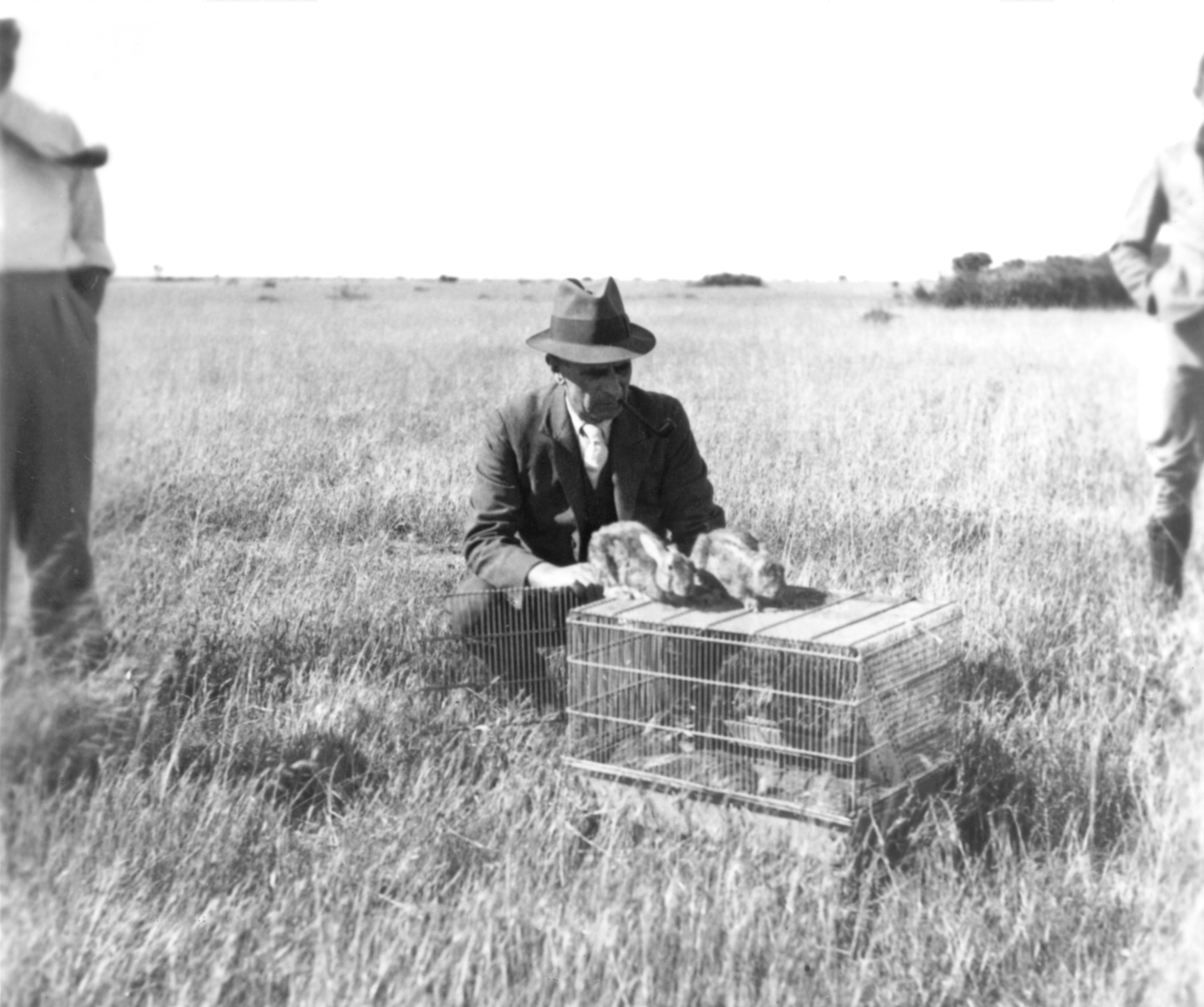
CSIRO ScienceImage 2232 Releasing the Myxoma Virus for Rabbits

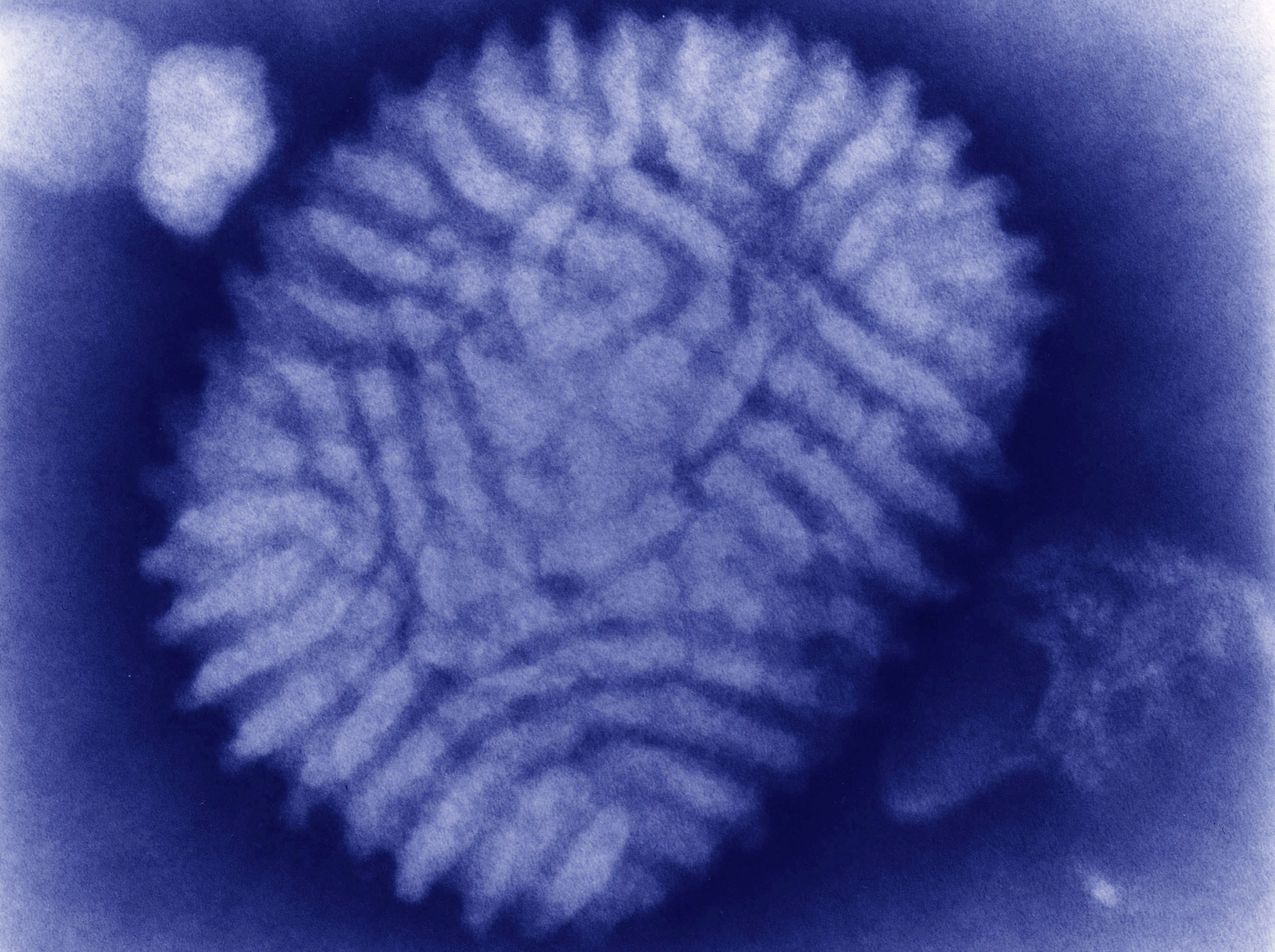
Image of a myxoma virus captured with a transmission electron microscope.

Rodents are a leading invasive species as vectors of pathogens, filling habitat niches, and overgrazing plants. Oryctolagus cuniculus, European rabbits, were introduced to Australia in 1788 as livestock and released for Europeans to hunt. Soon, the rabbits became widespread and changed Australia's ecological systems from overgrazing. In the 1950s, researchers implemented Myxoma virus (MYXV), a virus indigenous to South America that is transmitted by arthropods like mosquitoes, fleas, and ticks, to reduce rabbit populations. The virus did not transmit well and died off during this first attempt. However, scientists implemented the Myxoma virus in Europe where Oryctolagus cuniculus is also abundant and destructive, and found more promising results. Europe is more humid, thus attracting more arthropod vectors, whereas the area they dispersed in Australia is more arid, and they are released during the fall season in Australia. However, researchers continue investigating the Myxoma virus along with other viruses that will manage the Oryctolagus cuniculus populations and other hare populations globally. Other virus studies include Californian MYXV, Rabbit Fibroma Virus, Hare Fibroma Virus, Squirrel Fibroma Virus, and other species of Leporipoxvirus. Similar to the Myxoma virus, most are transmitted by arthropods like mosquitoes, mites, fleas, and ticks, but target different parts of the hare.

== Bacteria ==
Bacterial pathogens are a leading problem across organismal species, having many vectors, reservoirs, and direct infections. Utilizing viruses in the form of bacteriophages is showing progress in treatments of food-borne ailments and bacterial diseases. Scientists use phages as markers and indicators for food contamination because the phage needs a host, thus viral presence indicates a pre-existing host. Campylobacter, Salmonella, and Listeria monocytogenes showed promising results using bacteriophages to prevent meat spoilage and showed a reduction in numbers after viral methods were implemented. The virus is administered post-slaughter on the meat, but cases of treating livestock before slaughter also show reduced concentrations of food-borne bacteria. Lytic bacteriophages, viruses that lyse bacteria cells, P100 and A511 have been isolated and are accepted viruses for Listeria monocytogenes control in meats as the bacterium has a death rate of 25-30% when infected. Disease management using viruses is a leading study, but few have been approved for treatment. Staphylococcus aureus is prevalent in 30% of humans but can lead to lethal infections, sepsis, and death. Studies find lytic bacteriophage phiAGO1.3 to reduce host infection and reduce symptoms to latent.

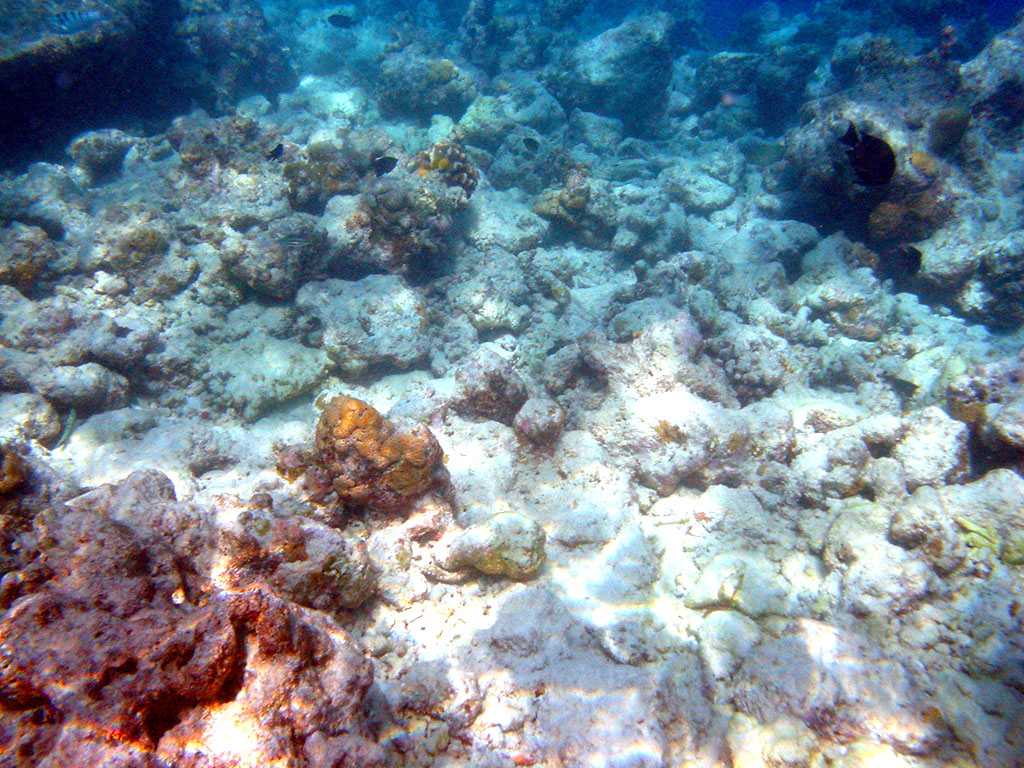
Moofushi bleached corals

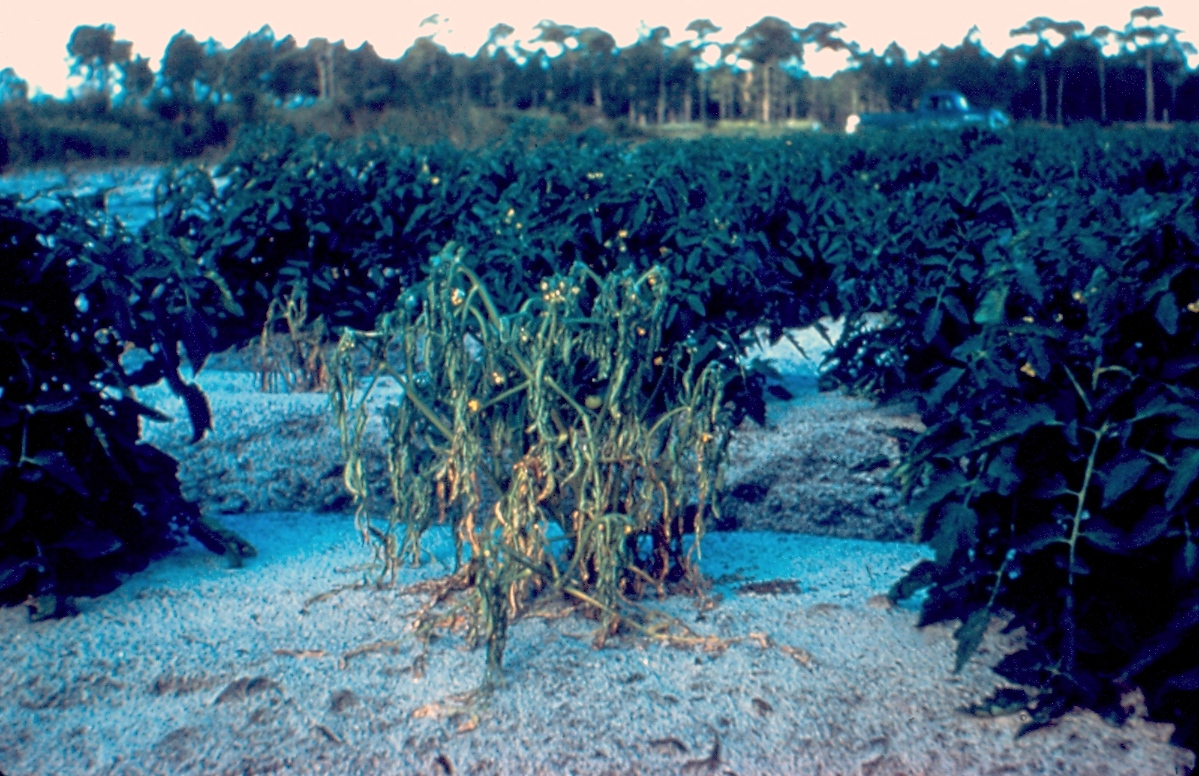
Tomato Bacterial wilt (Pathogen Ralstonia solanacearum) (12091835495)

Researchers are also utilizing phages for plant bacterial infections for ecological protection and reduction of invasive species. Bacteriophages are abundant in both marine and terrestrial habitats, but mostly undersoil or in areas with low UV-light exposure. In oceans, bacteriophages are important for nutrient cycles, degrading organic materials, and regulating bacteria growth in aquatic ecosystems. Lytic bacteriophage BONAISHI was dispersed in coral reef habitats and reduced Vibrio coralliilyticus, a bacteria responsible for severe global coral reef bleachings. Biofilms are abundant in both nature and in medical facilities and equipment. Lytic phages were also used to treat Pseudomonas aeruginosa for waste management and water protection. They found the viruses reduced the size of the biofilm, but research continues as biofilms are accumulations of multiple bacteria species, thus multiple viruses will be needed. In combating the loss of plants, researchers isolated two strains of Ralstonia solanacearum UA1591 against Ralstonia solanacearum, Moko Disease or bacterial wilt disease, in banana and plantains. Strains of Ralstonia solanacerum also affect tomato plants, and researchers narrowed phages φRSA1, φRSB1, φRSC1, and φRSL1 to control wilting and rot for 18 days.

== Fungi ==
Mycoviruses are explored for agriculture sustainability practice to protect plants. Fungi are a main pathogen with approximately 10,000 pathogenic species to plants.

=== Chestnut blight ===
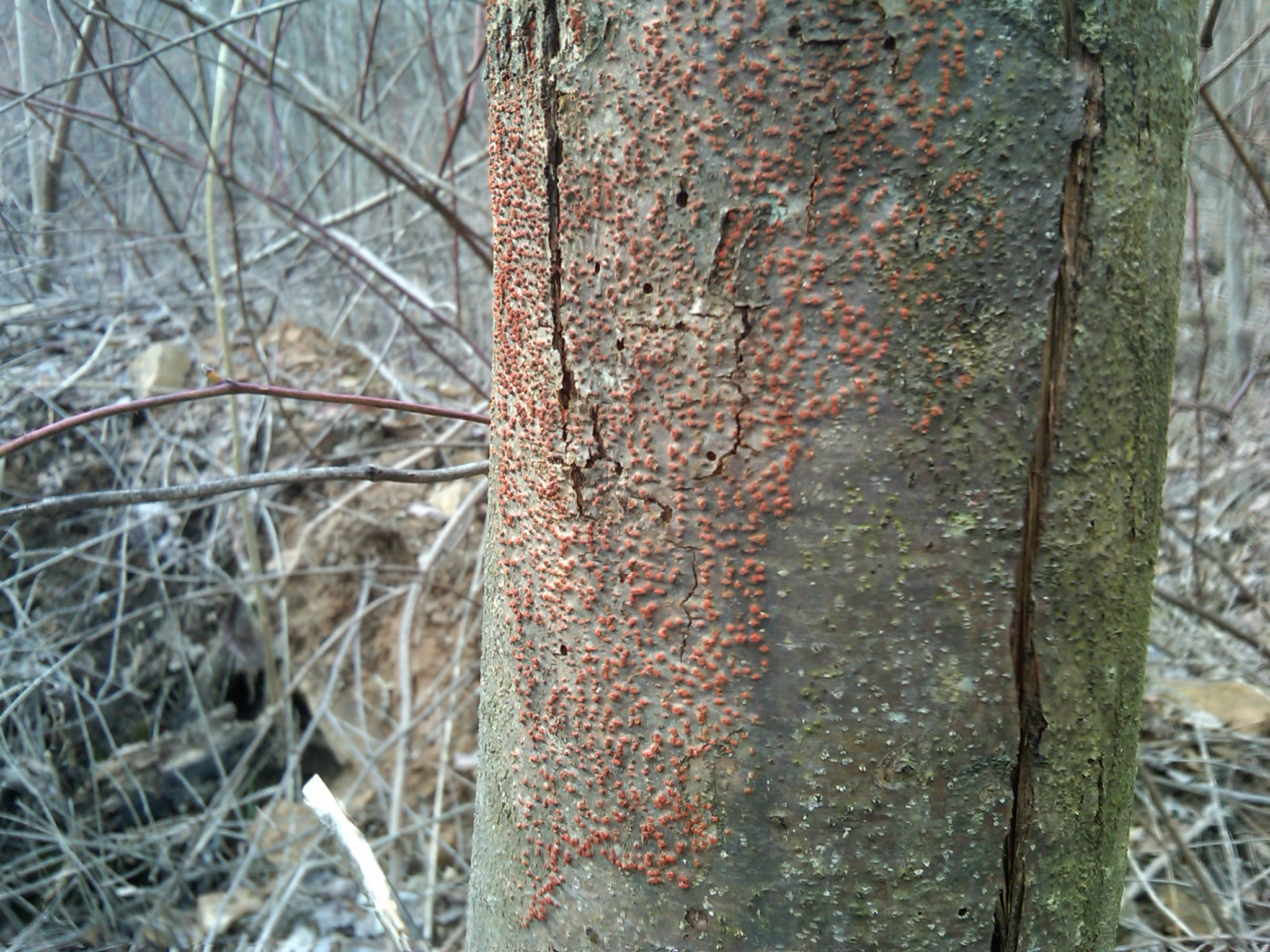
Chestnut blight on tree in Adams County Ohio

Cryphonectria parasitica or Chestnut blight, is a fungus indigenous to China, Japan, and Korea but spread to the United States from importation of Japanese Chestnut trees from Honshu. The first findings were in 1904 in New York City, US following in 1938 near Genoa, Italy due to trade and importation with the US. In the 1950s, researchers looked into hypovirulence, the use of viruses from the Hypovirus genus and Hypoviridae family, to target Cryphonectria parasitica to stop the fungal spread and damage. In 1978, Italy implemented the first hypervirulent strain against Cryphonectria parasitica on chestnut trees and reported the elimination of cankers from the blight within ten years of treatment. The researchers treated ten cankers per hectare with the fungal virus for the first three years of treatment, followed by treating five cankers per hectare for the years afterward. The main species of Hypoviruses has four variants of Cryphonectria hypovirus: CHV-1, CHV-2, CHV-3, and CHV-4. CHV-1 is the most studied variation implemented in Europe and was first introduced in Italy. CHV-1 shows the most reduced virulence of Cryphonectria parasitica, but later studies confirm CHV-2 and CHV-3 also lower virulence, while CHV-4 does not show significant violence reduction in Cryphonectria parasitica. Cryphonectria hypovirus targets the fungus’s cytoplasm, transmission horizontally through asexual spores, and vectors such as mites that feed on plants or fungi can spread the virus.

== Plants ==
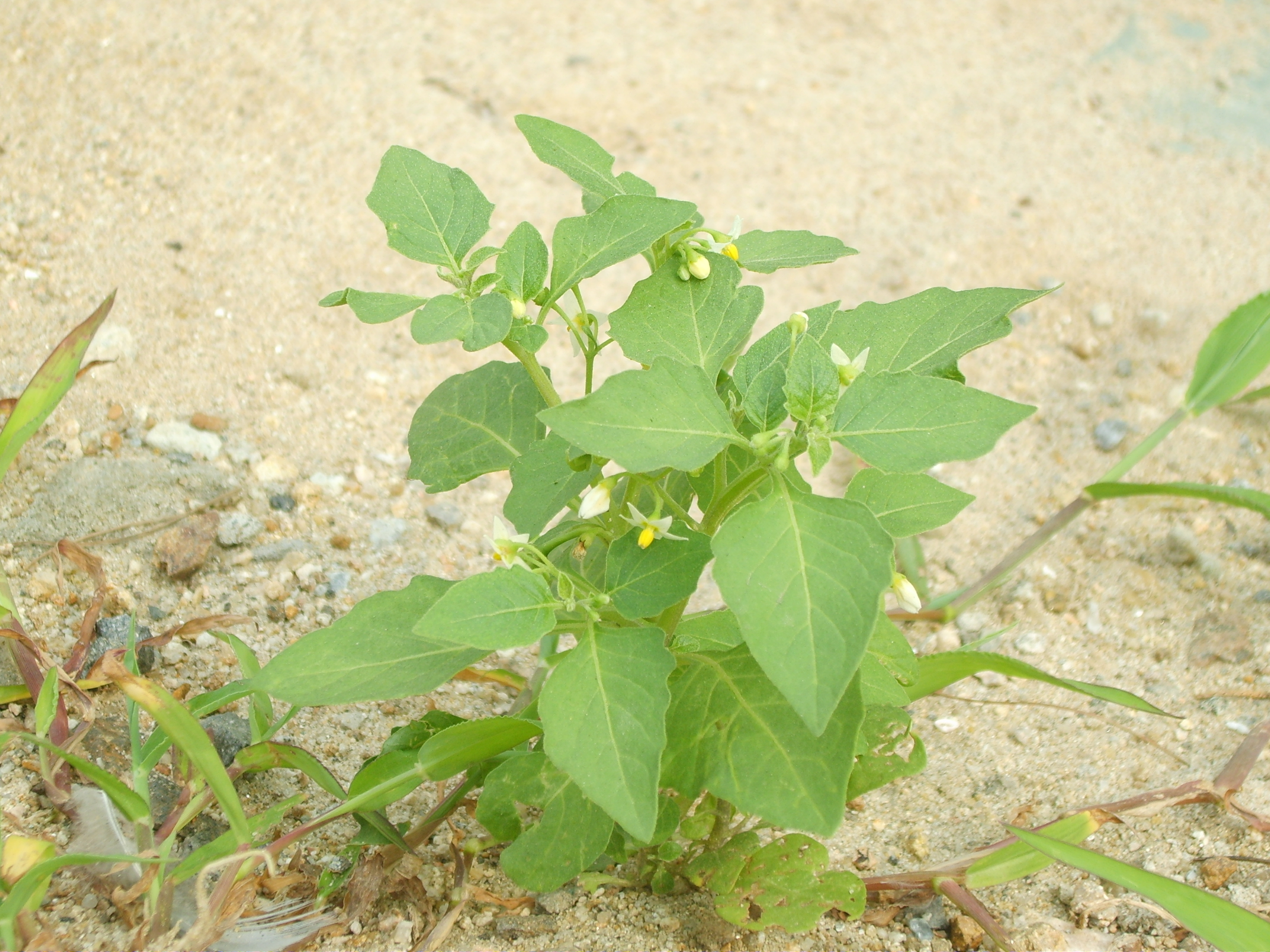
Solanum nigrum 01

Viruses reside in all plant populations and are under consideration for pre immunization or cross-protection against other plant viruses to lower infection rates and symptoms. The use of viral satellites, or subviral agents that rely on an additional virus to infect the host, show pre-immunization effects by inhibiting the virulence of viruses if the virus is unable to attach and infect the host’s cells. Cucumber mosaic virus causes stunted growth in plants, discolored leaves, necrosis, and other symptoms leading to plant death. Utilization of the viral satellites, CMV-KU1 and CMV-KU2, altered the virus phenotypic expression, reducing violence due to the interaction with the subviral particle (Monstasser, 2013). Other implementations of viruses include controlling weeds and other invasive plant species. Weeds and invasive species are main contributors to indigenous plant loss and agricultural plant loss. Researchers have isolated several viruses including Tobacco Mild Green Mosaic Tobamovirus, Tobacco Rattle Virus, and Arujia Mosaic Virus to combat invasive weeds. Tobacco Mild Green Mosaic Tobamovirus is used to control Solanum viarum, tropical soda apple, due to the weed's fast reproductive cycle, and quick spread, disrupting indigenous plant species in Florida. Araujia Mosaic Virus is used against the vining Araujia hortorum, moth plant, in New Zealand. The combination and individual use of Óbuda Pepper Virus and Pepino Mosaic Virus show reducing Solanum nigrum, Black nightshade, growth specifically in Europe.

== Current research and precautions ==
Viral biological control is a recently documented study but is rapidly expanding and being fine-tuned. Some complications of viral control methods include viral resistance of the pathogen and potential off-target effects. Pathogens over time become resistant to pesticides and have shown to become resistant to viruses, mitigating their effects, like the European rabbits in Australia becoming resistant to Myxoma virus. There is risk of off-target effects; viruses are specific to hosts but can mutate to infect other organisms, but there have not been many cases of viral resistance, so this raises low concern of this problem. Conversely, because viruses are specified to their host, multiple strains of viruses in the same viral family might not be effective on the same organism. Research of finding the correct viral strains to combat the invasive organism, invasive is costly and takes longer for research. Other concerns, specifically treating invasive plants and fungus, is the UV-light exposure as this causes genomic damage to the virus, disrupting their function and reduces biological control effects.

Nonetheless, researchers are finding viral biological control methods to be an effective alternative to other pest control managements like chemical pesticides as viruses biodegrade, turn the soil, and present in all ecosystems. Despite the initial costs for research, scientists find production and development cost of viral control agents to be cheaper compared to other herbicides. Among Canadian consumers, 70% concluded preferences using biological control methods such as viruses over the use of synthetic pesticides. Viral biological control is used globally and further research is being conducted to strengthen current viral biological control usage. Europe is further looking into Cryphonectria hypoviruses: CHV-1, CHV-2, CHV-3, and CHV-4 to find better viral cocktails and uses for the virus for other fungi. Virus utilization as insecticides are in heavy research as insects are main vectors for diseases, and cause ecosystem degradation. However, research for using insects as a viral reservoir are being considered for combating fungal, plant, and animal control mechanisms due to insects' wide range and dispersal.
