= Amphilogia =

Scientific classification
- Kingdom: Fungi
- Division: Ascomycota
- Class: Sordariomycetes
- Order: Diaporthales
- Family: Cryphonectriaceae
- Genus: Amphilogia; Gryzenh., H.F.Glen & M.J.Wingf. (2005)

Type species
- Amphilogia gyrosa (Berk. & Broome) Gryzenh., H.F. Glen & M.J.Wingf. (2005)

Species
- Amphilogia gyrosa Amphilogia major

Genus of fungi

Amphilogia is a genus of fungi within the family Cryphonectriaceae. It was established in 2005. The fungi cause orange cankers on branches of Elaeocarpus trees in Sri Lanka and New Zealand. While the type species of this genus (Amphilogia gyrosa) has been confused with the type species of Endothia (Endothia gyrosa), these fungi are distinct and both are accepted names.

The name, amphilogia, is derived from the Greek amphi (both sides) + logo (discussion), referring to taxonomic disputes around the genus.
