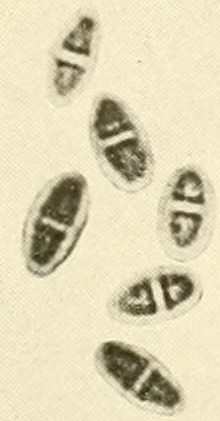
- Endothia radicalis ascospores from Lewis David de Schweinitz' specimen in Theodor Magnus Fries' herbarium

Scientific classification
- Kingdom: Fungi
- Division: Ascomycota
- Class: Sordariomycetes
- Order: Diaporthales
- Family: Cryphonectriaceae
- Genus: Endothia
- Species: E. radicalis

Binomial name
- Endothia radicalis (Schwein.) De Not., (1863)

Synonyms
- Cryphonectria radicalis; Endothia gyrosa; Melogramma gyrosum; Sphaeria radicalis

= Endothia radicalis =

Species of fungus

Endothia radicalis is a plant pathogen. It was discovered in 1916 by Stephen Bruner. He found it growing on eucalyptus, mango and avocado.
