= Buttington Oak =

Tree in Buttington, Wales

- Species: Oak (Quercus robur)
- Location: Buttington, Powys, Wales
- Coordinates: 52.678°N 3.111°W
- Date seeded: c. 1100
- Date felled: February 2018

External image
- Photograph of the Buttington Oak

The Buttington Oak was a tree near to Offa's Dyke at Buttington, Wales, said to have been planted to mark the site of the Battle of Buttington between the Vikings and a Mercian, Wessex and Welsh force in 893. It had been cyclically pollarded for timber until around 150 years ago. The oak tree was rediscovered in 2009. In 2017 it was badly damaged by storms, finally collapsing in February 2018. The Buttington Yew, also planted in commemoration of the battle in 893, survives and in 2022 was added to the roster of 70 Ancient Trees in The Queen's Green Canopy.

== History ==
The oak was said to have been planted by locals to mark the 893 Battle of Buttington, a victory of an allied Mercian, Wessex and Welsh force against invading Vikings or as a boundary marker on Offa's Dyke. The tree was located near Welshpool and close to the dyke, an 8th-century earthwork that marked the border between Mercia and the Kingdom of Powys. The tree stood in fields on a flood plain to the north of Buttington and east of the River Severn and was accessible by a public footpath (approximately half a mile's walk from the A458 road). The oak was a working tree, being pollarded, to provide timber for the local community and may have been used to fashion weapons.

== Description ==
The Buttington Oak was not rediscovered until 2009 and was not protected by any legislation. At around 11 metres (36 ft) in girth the oak was the largest tree on the dyke and the second-largest oak in Wales. It was recorded onto The Woodland Trust Ancient Tree Inventory site Tree No. 31758.

The Buttington Oak was badly damaged by storms in May 2017 which caused it to split in two. The tree fell in February 2018, an event first noticed by the man who trained the lady who recorded it in 2009. The tree was estimated to be more than one thousand years old when it died.

In March 2018, core samples were extracted from the trunk of the fallen tree by scientists from Cardiff University, assisted by the man who reported it fallen. These samples were analysed at the university initially, later being sent on to Kew scientists. Finally, samples were sent for further identification research to Professor Pedro Willem Crous at Westerdijk Institute. On 29 June 2020, the results of the research were published online at Fungal Planet. Present inside the tree were Cryphonectria radicalis, which is a benign cousin of chestnut blight. It is the fourth record of this species for the United Kingdom and the first for Wales. A second finding was a new species of fungus that has been named Ypsilina buttingtonensis.

== See also ==
- List of individual trees
