= Endothiella gyrosa =

Scientific classification
- Kingdom: Fungi
- Division: Ascomycota
- Class: Sordariomycetes
- Order: Diaporthales
- Family: Cryphonectriaceae
- Genus: Endothiella
- Species: E. gyrosa

Binomial name
- Endothiella gyrosa Sacc., (1906)

Species of fungus

Endothiella gyrosa is a plant pathogen.
