= All Saints Church, Buttington =

Church in Powys, Wales

Coordinates: 52.6721°N 3.1107°W

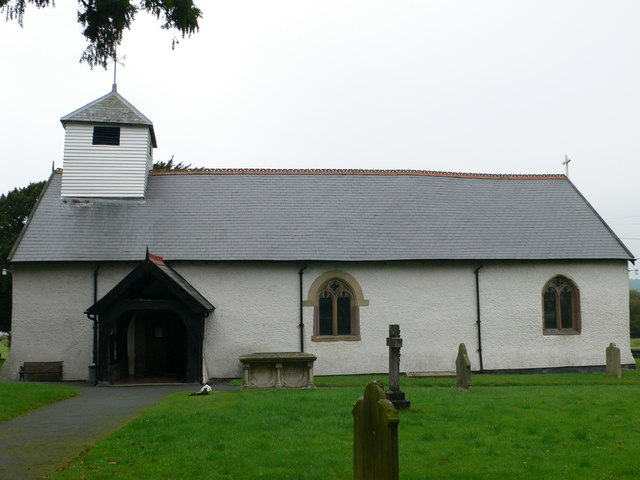

- Location in Powys
- OS grid reference: SJ 249 088
- Location: Buttington, Powys
- Country: Wales
- Denomination: Church in Wales

History
- Status: active

Architecture
- Heritage designation: Grade I
- Architectural type: Church
- Groundbreaking: 14th century

Administration
- Diocese: St Asaph
- Archdeaconry: Montgomery
- Deanery: Pool
- Parish: Mission Area of Pool

All Saints Church is an active parish church in the village of Buttington, Powys, Wales. The village lies just to the north-east of Welshpool. The church dates from the 14th century and was twice restored in the 19th. It is designated by Cadw as a Grade I listed building.

== History ==
The land on which the Church of All Saints stands formed part of a manor or grange to Strata Marcella Abbey. It is uncertain whether there was a church building, or indeed any building, on the site at this time. Cadw dates the present church to the 14th or 15th century. The porch has a datestone for 1686. Until 1849, the church was in the English Diocese of Hereford but it was transferred to St Asaph at this time. The church was heavily restored internally in the 1870s.

The church remains an active parish church in the Diocese of St Asaph and regular services are held.

== Architecture and description ==
All Saints is an extremely simple church comprising a combined nave and chancel with a squat bellcote above. The building material is mainly local rubble, whitewashed externally. All Saints is as a Grade I listed building. The former vicarage is listed at Grade II.

== Sources ==
- Scourfield, Robert; Haslam, Richard (2013). Powys: Montgomeryshire, Radnorshire and Breconshire. The Buildings of Wales. New Haven, US and London: Yale University Press. ISBN 978-0-300-18508-9. OCLC 863678002.
