= Aurapex =

Scientific classification
- Kingdom: Fungi
- Division: Ascomycota
- Class: Sordariomycetes
- Order: Diaporthales
- Family: Cryphonectriaceae
- Genus: Aurapex; Gryzenh. & M.J. Wingf. 2006
- Species: A. penicillata

Binomial name
- Aurapex penicillata Gryzenh. & M.J. Wingf. 2006

Single-species genus of fungi

Aurapex is a monotypic genus of fungi within the family Cryphonectriaceae containing the sole species Aurapex penicillata.
