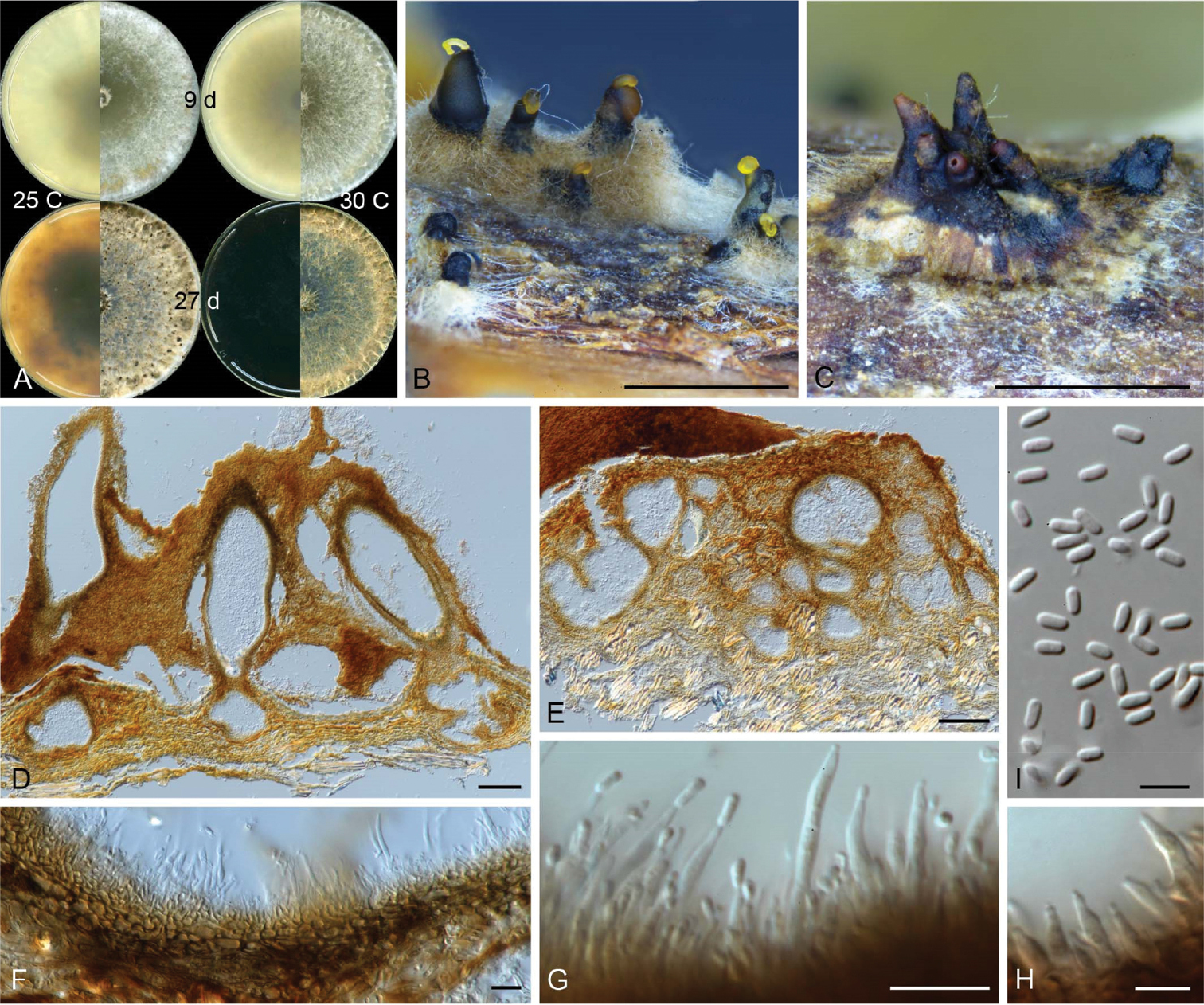
- Celoporthe hawaiiensis

Scientific classification
- Kingdom: Fungi
- Division: Ascomycota
- Class: Sordariomycetes
- Order: Diaporthales
- Family: Cryphonectriaceae
- Genus: Celoporthe; Nakab., Gryzenh., Jol.Roux & M.J.Wingf. (2006)

Type species
- Celoporthe dispersa Nakab., Gryzenh., Jol.Roux & M.J.Wingf. (2006)

Species
- C. dispersa C. eucalypti C. fontana C. guangdongensis C. hauoliensis C. hawaiiensis C. indonesiensis C. paradisiaca C. syzygii C. woodiana

= Celoporthe =

Genus of fungi

Celoporthe is a genus of ascomycete fungi within the family Cryphonectriaceae. It was circumscribed in 2006 to contain the type species Celoporthe dispersa, which was found in South Africa growing on trees in the Myrtales. In 2011, several species were described from China and Indonesia: C. eucalypti, C. guangdongensis, C. indonesiensis, and C. syzygii. Molecular analysis of DNA sequences revealed an additional two species from South Africa in 2013, C. fontana and C. woodiana and in 2020 three more species from Hawaii were added to the genus.
