= Endothiella =

Scientific classification
- Kingdom: Fungi
- Division: Ascomycota
- Class: Sordariomycetes
- Order: Diaporthales
- Family: Cryphonectriaceae
- Genus: Endothiella; Sacc. 1906

Species
- See text.

Genus of fungi

Endothiella is a genus of fungi within the family Cryphonectriaceae.

== Species ==
- Endothiella aggregata
- Endothiella anacardiacearum
- Endothiella caraganae
- Endothiella coccolobae
- Endothiella gyrosa
- Endothiella havanensis
- Endothiella japonica
- Endothiella longirostris
- Endothiella macrospora
- Endothiella natalensis
- Endothiella nitschkei
- Endothiella parasitica
- Endothiella robiniae
- Endothiella simonianii
- Endothiella singularis
- Endothiella tropicalis
- Endothiella viridistroma
- Endothiella vismiae
