= Cryptometrion =

Scientific classification
- Kingdom: Fungi
- Division: Ascomycota
- Class: Sordariomycetes
- Order: Diaporthales
- Family: Cryphonectriaceae
- Genus: Cryptometrion; Gryzenh. & M.J. Wingf. 2010
- Species: C. aestuescens

Binomial name
- Cryptometrion aestuescens Gryzenh. & M.J. Wingf. 2010

Genus of fungi

Cryptometrion is a monotypic genus of fungi within the family Cryphonectriaceae containing the sole species Cryptometrion aestuescens.
