= Latruncellus =

Scientific classification
- Kingdom: Fungi
- Division: Ascomycota
- Class: Sordariomycetes
- Order: Diaporthales
- Family: Cryphonectriaceae
- Genus: Latruncellus; M. Vermeulen, Gryzenh. & Jol. Roux 2011
- Species: L. aurorae

Binomial name
- Latruncellus aurorae M. Vermeulen, Gryzenh. & Jol. Roux 2011

Genus of fungi

Latruncellus is a monotypic genus of fungi within the family Cryphonectriaceae containing the sole species Latruncellus aurorae.
