= Rostraureum =

Scientific classification
- Kingdom: Fungi
- Division: Ascomycota
- Class: Sordariomycetes
- Order: Diaporthales
- Family: Cryphonectriaceae
- Genus: Rostraureum; Gryzenh. & M.J.Wingf. (2005)

Species
- R. longirostre R. tropicale

Genus of fungi

Rostraureum is a genus of fungi in the family Cryphonectriaceae. The genus was erected in 2005 with a single species, namely Rostraureum tropicale.
