= Microthia =

Scientific classification
- Kingdom: Fungi
- Division: Ascomycota
- Class: Sordariomycetes
- Order: Diaporthales
- Family: Cryphonectriaceae
- Genus: Microthia; Gryzenh. & M.J. Wingf. 2006

Species
- Microthia coccolobae Microthia havanensis

Genus of fungi

Microthia is a genus of fungi within the family Cryphonectriaceae.
