= Ursicollum =

Scientific classification
- Kingdom: Fungi
- Division: Ascomycota
- Class: Sordariomycetes
- Order: Diaporthales
- Family: Cryphonectriaceae
- Genus: Ursicollum; Gryzenh. & M.J.Wingf. (2006)
- Species: U. fallax

Binomial name
- Ursicollum fallax Gryzenh. & M.J.Wingf. (2006)

Genus of fungi

Ursicollum is a fungal genus in the family Cryphonectriaceae. A monotypic genus, Ursicollum contains the single species Ursicollum fallax.
