= Prosopidicola =

Scientific classification
- Kingdom: Fungi
- Division: Ascomycota
- Class: Sordariomycetes
- Order: Diaporthales
- Family: Cryphonectriaceae
- Genus: Prosopidicola; Crous & C.L. Lennox 2004
- Species: P. mexicana

Binomial name
- Prosopidicola mexicana Crous & C.L. Lennox 2004

Genus of fungi

Prosopidicola is a monotypic genus of fungi within the family Cryphonectriaceae containing the sole species Prosopidicola mexicana.
