= Aurifilum =

Scientific classification
- Kingdom: Fungi
- Division: Ascomycota
- Class: Sordariomycetes
- Order: Diaporthales
- Family: Cryphonectriaceae
- Genus: Aurifilum; Begoude, Gryzenh. & Jol. Roux 2010
- Species: A. marmelostoma

Binomial name
- Aurifilum marmelostoma Begoude, Gryzenh. & Jol. Roux 2010

Single-species genus of fungi

Aurifilum is a monotypic genus of fungi within the family Cryphonectriaceae containing the sole species Aurifilum marmelostoma.
