= Holocryphia =

Scientific classification
- Kingdom: Fungi
- Division: Ascomycota
- Class: Sordariomycetes
- Order: Diaporthales
- Family: Cryphonectriaceae
- Genus: Holocryphia; Gryzenh. & M.J. Wingf. 2006
- Species: H. eucalypti

Binomial name
- Holocryphia eucalypti (M. Venter & M.J. Wingf.) Gryzenh. & M.J. Wingf. 2006

Genus of fungi

Holocryphia is a monotypic genus of fungi within the family Cryphonectriaceae containing the sole species Holocryphia eucalypti.
