= Foliocryphia =

Scientific classification
- Kingdom: Fungi
- Division: Ascomycota
- Class: Sordariomycetes
- Order: Diaporthales
- Family: Cryphonectriaceae
- Genus: Foliocryphia; Cheew. & Crous 2009
- Species: F. eucalypti

Binomial name
- Foliocryphia eucalypti Cheew. & Crous 2009

Genus of fungi

Foliocryphia is a monotypic genus of fungi within the family Cryphonectriaceae containing the sole species Foliocryphia eucalypti.
