= Chrysoporthe =

Scientific classification
- Kingdom: Fungi
- Division: Ascomycota
- Class: Sordariomycetes
- Order: Diaporthales
- Family: Cryphonectriaceae
- Genus: Chrysoporthe; Gryzenh. & M.J.Wingf. (2004)

Species
- Chrysoporthe austroafricana Chrysoporthe cubensis Chrysoporthe deuterocubensis Chrysoporthe doradensis Chrysoporthe hodgesiana Chrysoporthe inopina Chrysoporthe syzygiicola Chrysoporthe zambiensis

Genus of fungi

Chrysoporthe is a genus of fungi in the family Cryphonectriaceae.
