= Buttington =

Coordinates: 52.66°N 03.12°W

Buttington: Welsh: Tal-y-bont
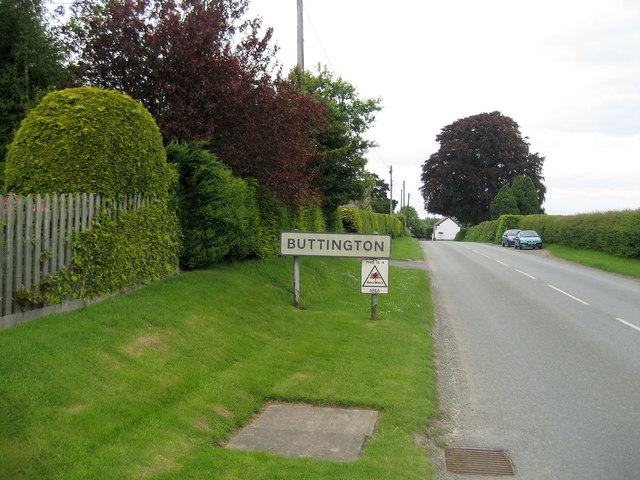
- Entering Buttington

- Location within Powys
- OS grid reference: SJ2408
- Principal area: Powys
- Country: Wales
- Sovereign state: United Kingdom
- Police: Dyfed-Powys
- Fire: Mid and West Wales
- Ambulance: Welsh
- UK Parliament: Montgomeryshire and Glyndŵr
- Senedd Cymru – Welsh Parliament: Montgomeryshire

Buttington (Welsh: Tal-y-bont) is a village in Powys, Wales, less than 3 km from Welshpool and about 300 m from the River Severn, in the community of Trewern. The Montgomery Canal passes through the village. The village stands on a slight rise above the river's floodplain, by the ancient ford called Rhyd-y-groes, where Offa's Dyke meets the Severn. The ford retained strategic value: reportedly in 1039 a battle took place here between Welsh and English forces. All Saints Church is a Grade I listed building.

== The Battle of Buttington ==
At Buttington in 893 a combined Welsh and Mercian army under Æthelred, Lord of the Mercians, defeated a Danish army which had marched from Essex. This was the decisive battle in the war against the Viking invasion of the 890s. The Buttington Oak stood near the village until February 2018 and was said to have been planted by local people to commemorate the battle.

== Notable people ==
- Sir William Boyd Dawkins FRS FSA FGS (1837–1929), geologist and archaeologist.

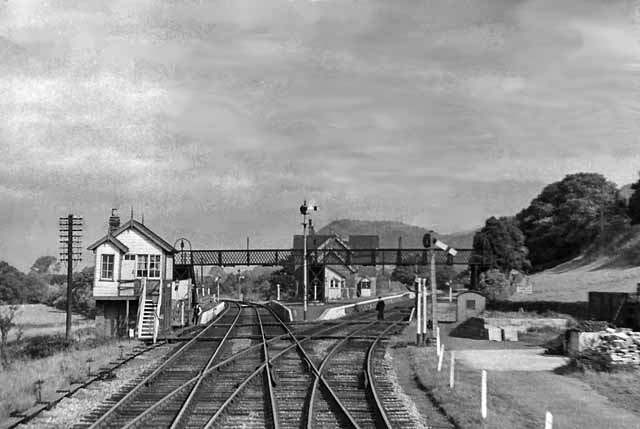
Former Buttington railway station in 1953; at the junction between the Cambrian Railways main line from Aberystwyth with the Shrewsbury and Welshpool Railway
