= Neil Everett Stevens =

American botanist (1887–1949)

Neil Everett Stevens (April 6, 1887 – June 26, 1949) was an American mycologist and plant pathologist. He served as president of the Botanical Society of Washington (1931), American Phytopathological Society (1934), and Botanical Society of America (1948). His research chiefly concerned fungal diseases of crops such as chestnuts, strawberries, cranberries, currant, and corn. Stevens was born in Portland, Maine, graduated from Bates College in 1908, and earned a PhD. from Yale University in 1911. He was instructor at Kansas State College from 1911 to 1912, then worked at the Bureau of Plant Industry of the U.S. Department of Agriculture from 1912 to 1936. He worked as adjunct professor at George Washington University from 1931 to 1936, then professor of botany and plant pathology at the University of Illinois from 1936 to 1949.

The standard author abbreviation N.E.Stevens is used to indicate this person as the author when citing a botanical name.
