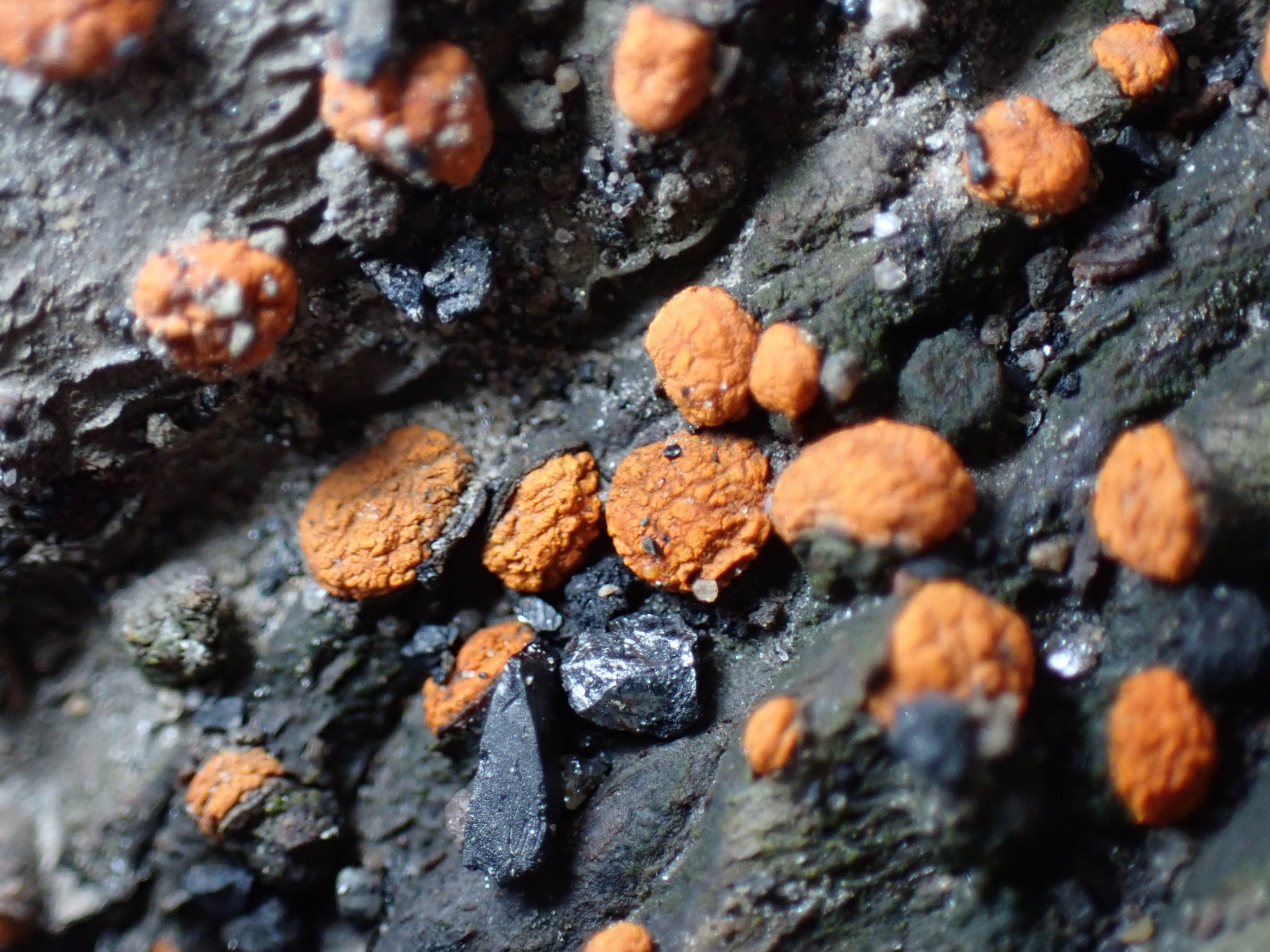

Scientific classification
- Kingdom: Fungi
- Division: Ascomycota
- Class: Sordariomycetes
- Order: Diaporthales
- Family: Cryphonectriaceae
- Genus: Endothia
- Species: E. gyrosa

Binomial name
- Endothia gyrosa (Schwein.) Berk. (1860)

Synonyms
- Sphaeria gyrosa Schwein. (1822); Melogramma gyrosum (Schwein.) Tul. & C.Tul. (1863); Diatrype gyrosa (Schwein.) Berk. & Broome (1873)

= Endothia gyrosa =

Species of fungus

Endothia gyrosa, the orange hobnail canker, is a species of sac fungus in the family Cryphonectriaceae. It is the type species of the genus Endothia. While previously classified in the genus Melogramma, phylogenetic analyses have confirmed the independent status of this species. It is found on a variety of host genera in North America including Quercus, Fagus, Liquidambar, Acer, Ilex, Vitis and Prunus.
