= Hypovirus =

Hypoviridae

Virus classification
- (unranked): Virus
- Realm: Riboviria
- Kingdom: Orthornavirae
- Phylum: Pisuviricota
- Class: Duplopiviricetes
- Order: Durnavirales
- Family: Hypoviridae

Family of viruses

Hypoviruses are a family of viruses that constitute the family Hypoviridae. Fungi serve as natural hosts. There are eight genera in the family. Infection reduces the virulence of its parasitic host, making it a hyperparasite useful for blight control.

== Taxonomy ==
The family contains the following genera:

- Alphahypovirus
- Betahypovirus
- Deltahypovirus
- Epsilonhypovirus
- Etahypovirus
- Gammahypovirus
- Thetahypovirus
- Zetahypovirus

== Structure ==
The diameter is around 50–80 nm. Genomes are linear, around 9–13kb in length. The genome has 1 or 2 open reading frames, named OrfA (not always present) and OrfB.

The genome contains no structural proteins. The virus accordingly does not bud out of the cell. Both open reading frames of CHV1 contain a papain-like protease to the N-terminal that is autocatalyticly cleaved. OrfA (p69, P10941) cleaves into the p29 C7 protease and a nonessential p40 protein. OrfB (Q04350) cleaves into a p48 C8 protease and the RNA replicase–helicase.

== Life cycle ==
Viral replication is cytoplasmic. Replication follows the double-stranded RNA virus replication model. Double-stranded RNA virus transcription is the method of transcription. The virus exits the host cell by cell to cell movement. Fungi serve as the natural host.

== CHV1 – Chestnut blight hypovirulence ==
Up to 2000, Hypovirus CHV1 was the only hypovirus found in Europe. It is known for reducing the virulence of the fungus that causes chestnut blight (i.e. hypovirulence). Cryphonectria parasitica, the ascomycete fungus, originated in Asia and causes the disease chestnut blight in several chestnut species (Castanea spp.). Although symptoms are mild in Asian chestnut species that have co-evolved with the fungus, they are very severe in the North American chestnut species C. dentata and also in the European sweet chestnut, C. sativa. Hypovirus has been used for protection against chestnut blight in Europe since the 1970s.
