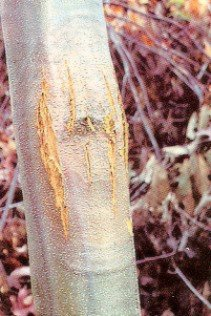
- Cankers caused by the fungal infection cause the bark to split.

Scientific classification
- Kingdom: Fungi
- Division: Ascomycota
- Class: Sordariomycetes
- Order: Diaporthales
- Family: Cryphonectriaceae
- Genus: Cryphonectria
- Species: C. parasitica

Binomial name
- Cryphonectria parasitica (Murrill) M.E.Barr (1978)

Synonyms
- Diaporthe parasitica Murrill (1906)

= Chestnut blight =

Chestnut blight fungus

Fungus disease of chestnut trees

The pathogenic fungus Cryphonectria parasitica (formerly Endothia parasitica) is a member of the Ascomycota (sac fungi). This necrotrophic fungus is native to East Asia and South East Asia and was introduced into Europe and North America in the early 1900s. Strains of the fungus spread rapidly and caused significant tree loss in both regions. Strains of the fungus can be more or less virulent.

== Overview ==
Cryphonectria parasitica is a parasitic fungus of chestnut trees. This disease came to be known as chestnut blight. Naturally found in Southeast Asia, accidental introductions led to invasive populations of C. parasitica in North America and Europe. In the first half of the 20th century, the fungal disease had a devastating economic and social impact on communities in the eastern United States. It killed an estimated four billion trees; or, by another count, 3.5 billion trees through 2013. Less severe impacts have occurred in Europe due to widespread CHV1-induced hypovirulence. CHV1 is one of at least two viral pathogens that weaken the fungus through hypovirulence and helps trees survive a blight infection.

The American chestnut (Castanea dentata) and American chinquapin (Castanea pumila) are highly susceptible to chestnut blight. The European chestnut (Castanea sativa) is also susceptible, but due to widespread CHV1 hypovirulence, blight-induced tree death is less common. The fungus can infect other tree species such as oaks, red maples, staghorn sumacs, and shagbark hickories. Once infected, these trees' bark also exhibit orange cankers but may not die. The pathogen can persist in these trees, producing spores that may infect other trees.

Fungal strains spread by wind-borne ascospores and, over a shorter distance, conidia distributed by rain-splash action. Infection can be local in range, so some isolated American chestnuts survive where there is no other infected tree within 10 km (6.2 mi). Soil organisms at the root collar and root system of the chestnut tree are antagonistic to the fungus. Chestnut tree roots are resistant to blight infections. Consequently, a large number of small American chestnut trees still exist as shoots growing from existing root bases. However, these regrown shoots seldom reach the reproductive stage before above ground growth is again girdled by the fungus. Fungal strains originally infected the Chinese chestnut (Ca. mollissima) and the Japanese chestnut (Ca. crenata). These two species have co-evolved with the pathogen, making them most variably resistant to its ill effects.

== History ==
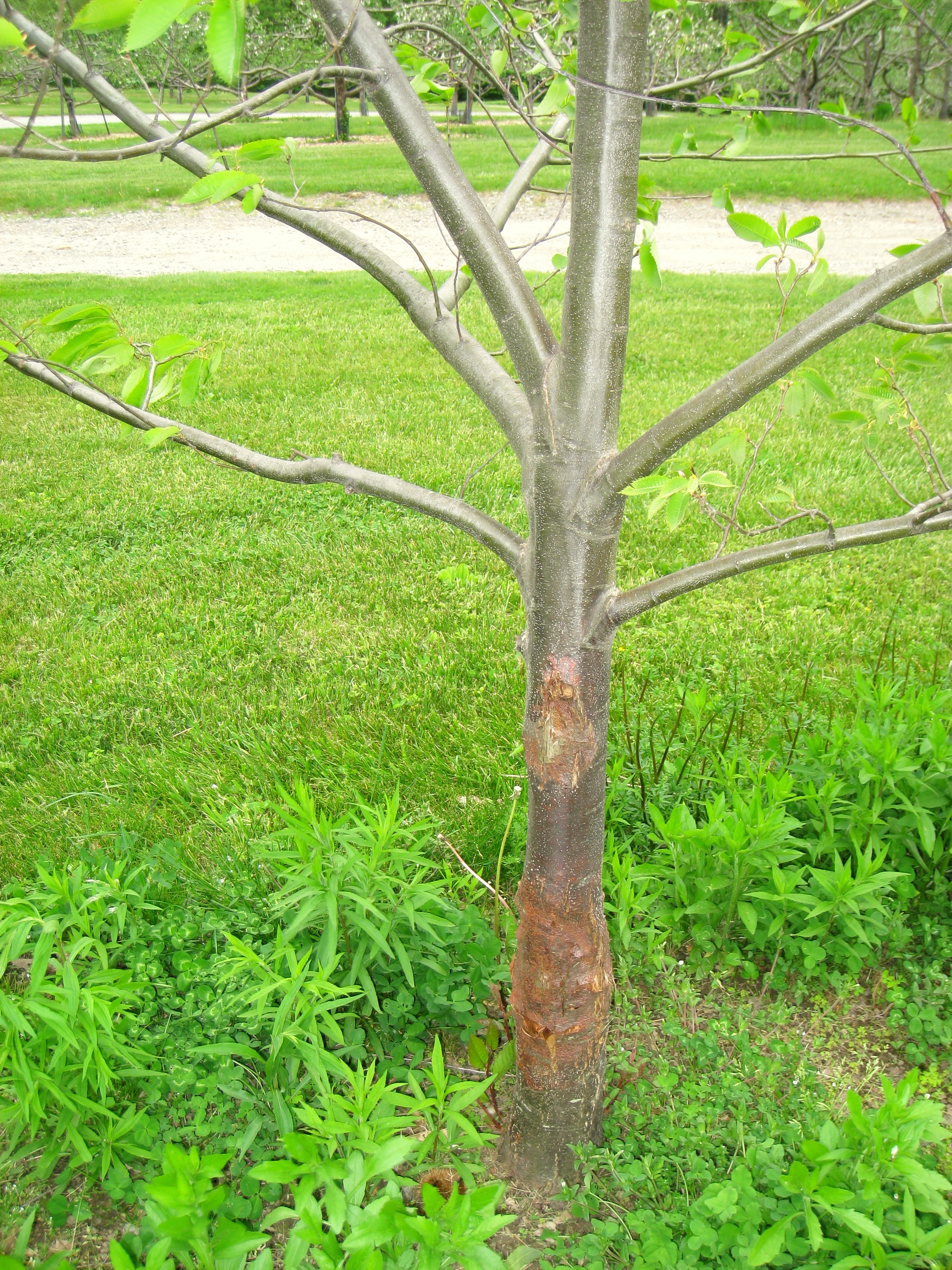
Chestnut blight affecting a young American chestnut

=== Infections in North America ===
Cryphonectria parasitica was introduced into the United States from East Asia via import of Japanese chestnut trees. Commercial breeding purposes motivated these imports. Infection of American chestnut trees with C. parasitica simultaneously appeared in numerous places on the East Coast, most likely from Japanese chestnuts, which had become popular imports.

Herman W. Merkel, a forester at the New York Zoological Garden (Bronx Zoo) first found infected chestnut trees on the grounds of the zoo. In 1905, American mycologist William Murrill isolated and described the fungus responsible (which he named Diaporthe parasitica), and demonstrated by inoculation into healthy plants that the fungus caused the disease. By 1940, most mature American chestnut trees had been girdled by the disease. It took about 40 years to devastate the nearly four-billion-strong American chestnut population in North America. Today, uninfected wild American chestnut trees are extraordinarily rare, with researchers encouraging members of the public to report sightings. The world's largest remaining stand of genetically pure, mature American chestnut trees is near West Salem, Wisconsin, where scientists have been trying for decades to save the trees while studying the efficacy of hypoviruses that target the blight fungus. Other sightings of mature American chestnut trees have been reported within and outside of its original range, including in Alabama, Kentucky, Maine, Michigan, Ohio, Tennessee, and Vermont.

Japanese and Chinese chestnut trees may resist an infection from C. parasitica. Because of the disease, American chestnut wood almost disappeared from the market for decades, although it can still be obtained as reclaimed lumber.

It is estimated that in some places, such as the Appalachian Mountains, one in every four trees was an American chestnut. Mature trees often grew straight and branch-free for 50 feet (15 m) and could grow up to 100 feet (30 m) tall with a trunk diameter of 4–5 feet (1.2–1.5 m) at a few feet above ground level. The reddish-brown wood was lightweight, soft, easy to split, very resistant to decay, and did not warp or shrink. For three centuries many barns and homes near the Appalachian Mountains were made from American chestnut. Its straight-grained wood was ideal for building furniture and caskets. The bark and wood were rich in tannic acid, which provided tannins for use in the tanning of leather.

Chestnuts were an important cash crop and food source. Many native animals fed on chestnuts, and chestnuts were used for livestock feed, which kept the cost of raising livestock low.

Since the 1930s, there have been various efforts to repopulate chestnut trees in the United States. Surviving American chestnut trees are being bred for resistance to the blight, notably by The American Chestnut Foundation, which aims to reintroduce a blight-resistant American chestnut to its original forest range within the early decades of the 21st century. Japanese chestnut and Chinese chestnut, as well as Seguin's chestnut and Henry's chestnut, have been used in these breeding programs in the US to create disease-resistant hybrids with the American chestnut. Chinese chestnut trees have been found to have the highest resistance to chestnut blight; however, individuals within the Chinese chestnut species may vary in blight resistance. Some individuals are still quite susceptible while others are essentially immune.

Hypovirulence is not widespread in the US and attempts to commercially introduce CHV1 virus have not been widely successful. Though CHV1 persists in applied trees, it does not spread naturally as it does in Europe, preventing it from being an effective form of biocontrol.

=== Infections in Europe ===
In 1938, chestnut blight was first identified around Genoa. Infection quickly spread and was identified in France in 1946, Switzerland in 1951, and Greece in 1963. It has most recently been found in the UK. Due to genetic differences between the fungal populations (strains), it is likely that a second introduction of chestnut blight occurred in Georgia and Azerbaijan in 1938. The fungal infections initially caused widespread tree death in Europe. However, in the early 1950s trees were identified in Italy that survived fungal infection. On these trees, the fungus caused more superficial cankers, that appeared to be healing. The milder infection outcome was due to the presence of CHV1, an RNA virus that infects C. parasitica. CHV1 spread naturally throughout Europe but is also spread artificially as a biocontrol measure (particularly in France). CHV1 is currently not present in the UK, Northern France, or Eastern Georgia but an introduction for biocontrol is being considered.

== Symptoms ==
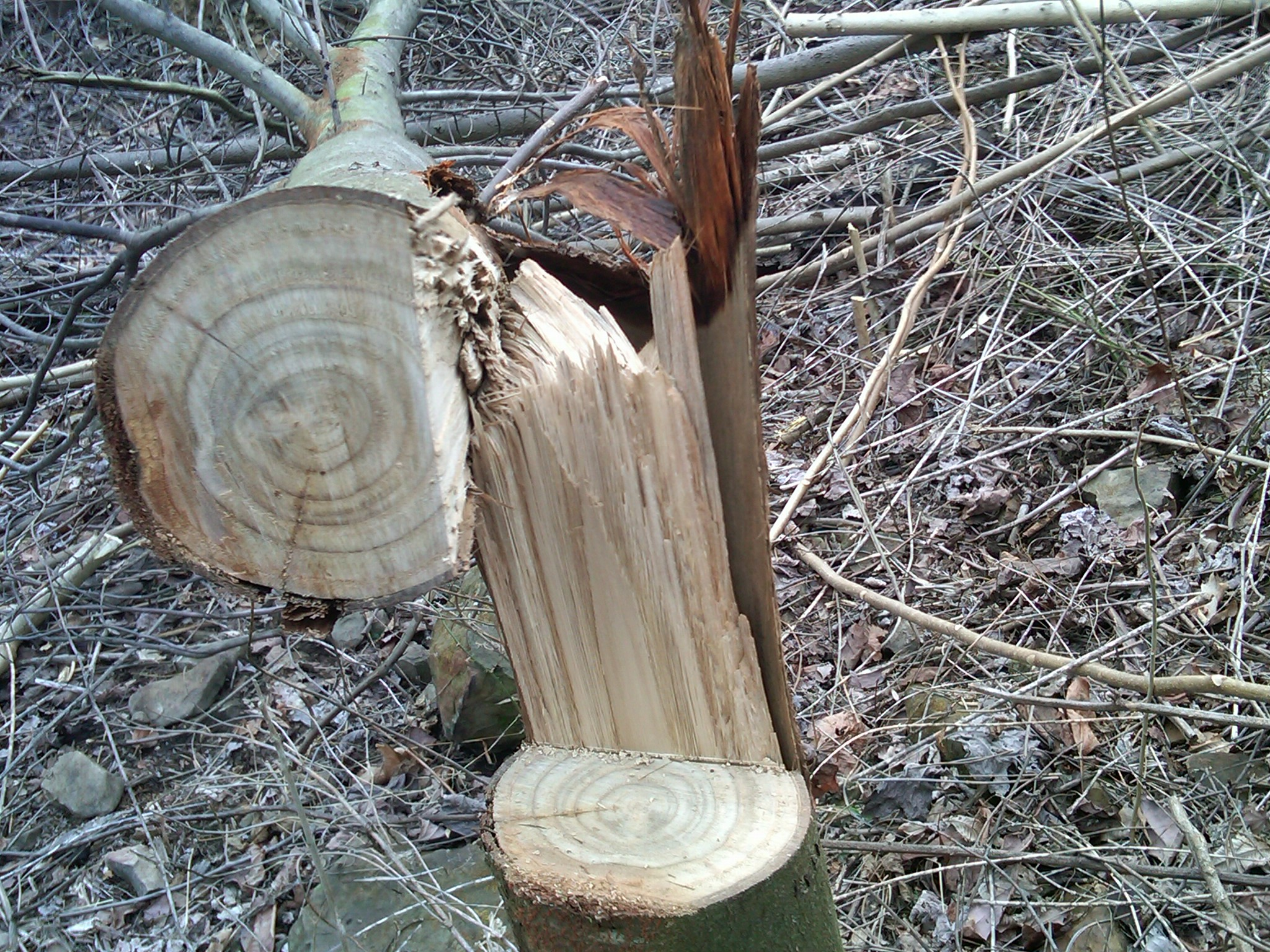
A chestnut tree that has been felled, with blight on its inner bark and trunk

The fungus enters through wounds on susceptible trees and grows in and beneath the bark, eventually killing the vascular cambium all the way around the twig, branch, or trunk. The first symptom of C. parasitica infection is a small orange-brown area on the tree bark. A sunken canker then forms as the mycelial fan spreads under the bark. As the hyphae spread, they produce several toxic compounds, the most notable of which is oxalic acid. This acid lowers the pH of the infected tissue from around the normal 5.5 to approximately 2.8, which is toxic to cambium cells. The canker eventually girdles the tree, killing everything above it. Distinctive yellow tendrils (cirrus) of conidia can be seen extruding in wet weather.

== Life cycle and reproduction ==
The primary plant tissues targeted by C. parasitica are the inner bark, an area containing the conductive tissue, and the vascular cambium, a layer of actively dividing cells that give rise to secondary vascular tissues. In these tissues, the pathogen forms diffuse cankers in which the mycelium overwinters. In the following spring, two types of fruiting bodies will form: pycnidia, usually first, and perithecia. Following rainfall, the pycnidia ooze orange tendrils of conidia, the asexual spores, while perithecia forcibly eject ascospores, the sexual spores. Upon becoming airborne, ascospores are carried by eddies of wind to new hosts or infect other parts of the same tree. When insects, birds, or other wildlife come into contact with the cankers, they can mechanically disperse the conidia to a new host. Additionally, the asexual spores can be dispersed by rain splash. Once on the new host, or new area of the tree, the spores can germinate and infect the inner bark through insect wounds and fissures in the outer bark.

If cankers continue to form and expand, the fungus can girdle the stem, severing the flow of nutrients and water to the vital vegetative tissues. The absence of nutrient dispersal will result in above ground tree death. However, the root system may survive. As a result, American chestnuts exist mainly as shrubs sprouting from the old, surviving roots. These sprouts usually die of infection by C. parasitica before reaching sexual maturity.

== Management: hypovirulence, sanitation, and chemical control ==
In Europe, during the late 1960s, it was found that a strain of C. parasitica was less virulent, only able to produce shallow cankers that the tree's callus tissue could eventually limit and isolate. The trait of hypovirulence could be transferred from an avirulent strain to a lethal strain through anastomosis—the fusion of hyphae. It was later discovered that this attenuated virulence was due to infection by a dsRNA mycovirus, Cryphonectria hypovirus 1 (CHV1) of genus Hypovirus.

Considering the nature of hypovirulent strains, there has been a strong interest to use them to manage lethal C. parasitica strains. In Europe, natural dissemination of hypovirulence in pathogen populations resulted in the restoration of economically valuable chestnuts. Unfortunately, this was not the case in the United States. Compared to Europe, the US has a greater diversity of C. parasitica strains. Thus, the spread of the mycovirus in American C. parasitica populations is inhibited by vegetative incompatibility, an allorecognition system that inhibits the fusion of hyphae between individuals that are genetically distinct at specific loci. In 2016, however, "super mycovirus donor strains" of C. parasitica were engineered to overcome this incompatibility system. This could potentially be employed as a method of biological control.

As mentioned above some soil microorganisms suppress C. parasitica. This can be used to treat the cankers, by using a soil compress, a quantity of soil held against the trunk itself with plastic wrap and some adhesive tape around that.

In addition to biocontrol, chestnut blight can also be managed by sanitation practices and chemical control; however, such management strategies are only feasible on a small scale, such as in an orchard. Sanitation practices like the pruning of symptomatic limbs and removal of infected trees can serve to eliminate sources of inoculum and limit the spread of the pathogen.

Additionally, some fungicides may be effective at controlling this fungal disease. A study on the chemical control of chestnut blight in Castanea sativa, may have found that the external application of both copper oxychloride and carbendazim could reduce the rate of disease by almost 50%.

== Conservation efforts in North America ==
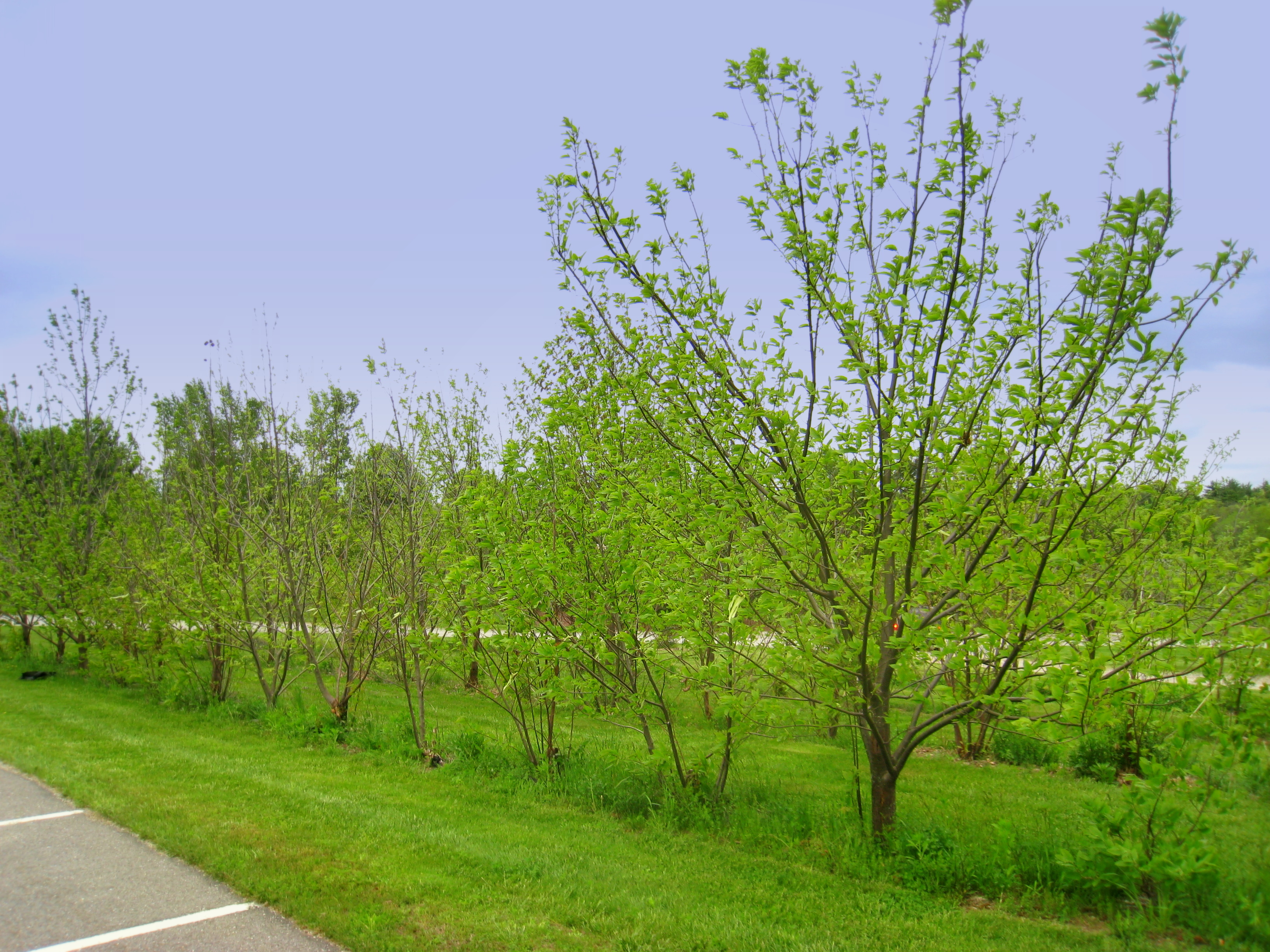
Experimental trials by The American Chestnut Foundation at Tower Hill Botanic Garden in Massachusetts

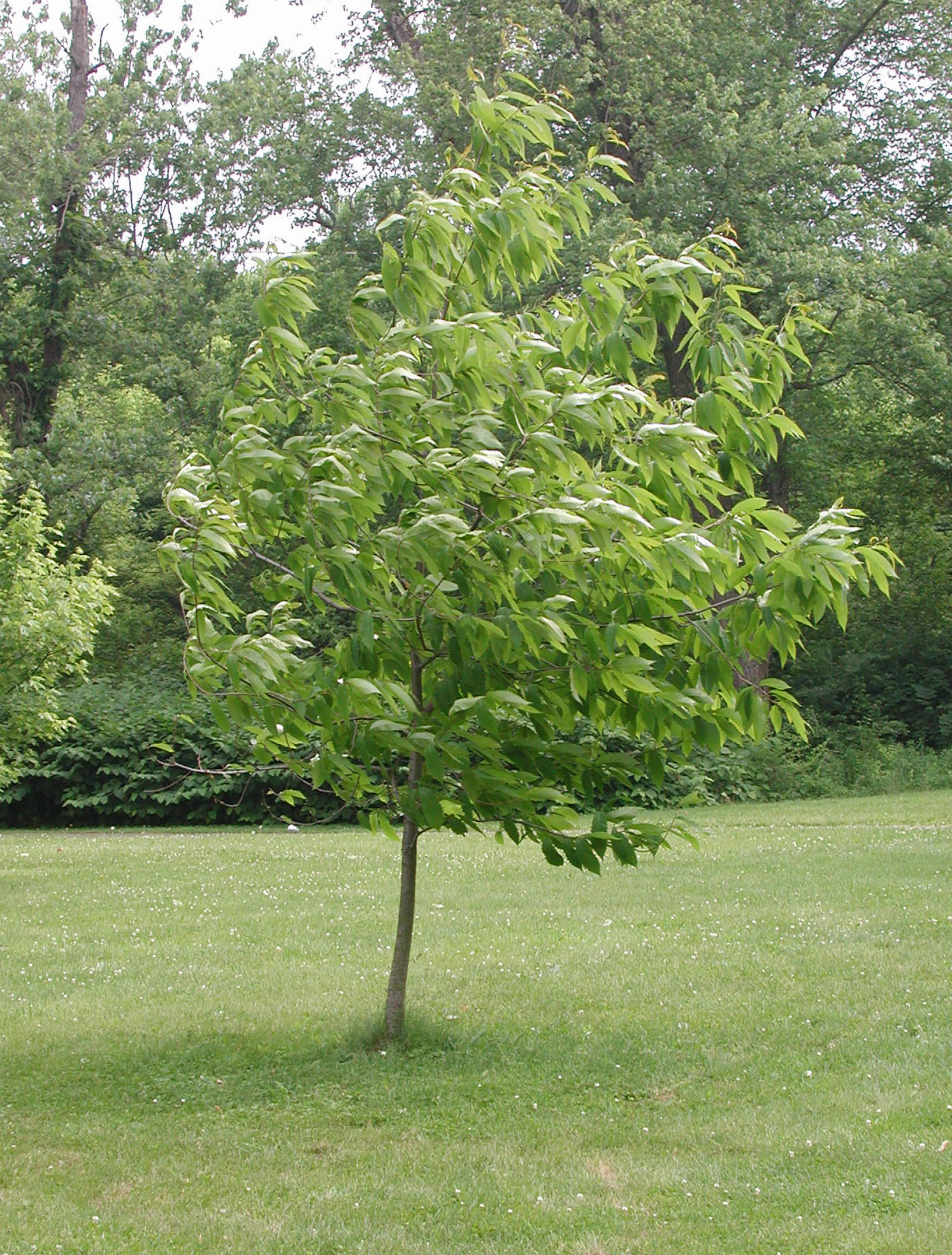
American chestnut field trial sapling from the American Chestnut Cooperators Foundation

There are approximately 2,500 chestnut trees growing on 60 acres (24 ha) near West Salem, Wisconsin, which is the world's largest remaining stand of American chestnut. These trees are the descendants of those planted by Martin Hicks, an early settler in the area. In the late 1800s, Hicks planted fewer than a dozen chestnuts. Planted outside the natural range of American chestnut, these trees escaped the initial wave of infection by chestnut blight, but in 1987 scientists found blight also in this stand. There is a program to bring American chestnut back to the Eastern forest funded by the American Chestnut Foundation, Wisconsin Department of Natural Resources, USDA Forest Service, West Virginia University, Michigan State University, and Cornell University.

Removing blighted trees to control the disease was first attempted when the blight was discovered, but this proved to be an ineffective solution. Scientists then set out to introduce a hyperparasitic hypovirus into the chestnut blight fungus. The trees infected with virus-treated fungus responded immediately and began to heal over their cankers. However, the virus was so efficient at attenuating fungal growth that it prevented the spreading of the virus from an infected fungus growing on one tree to that growing on another tree. Only the virus-treated trees recovered. Scientific opinion regarding the future of the stand varies.

=== Hybrid chestnut trees ===
Current efforts are underway by the Forest Health Initiative to use modern breeding techniques and genetic engineering to create resistant tree strains, with contributions from SUNY College of Environmental Science and Forestry, Pennsylvania State University, the University of Georgia, and the United States Forest Service. One of the most successful methods of breeding is to create a back cross of a resistant species (such as one from China or Japan) and American chestnut. Researchers identified two or three genes that allow for blight resistance, and are focusing on giving the American chestnut hybrids only those genes from the Chinese or Japanese chestnut.

The two species are first bred to create a 50/50 hybrid. After three backcrosses with American chestnut, the remaining genome is approximately 1/16 that of the resistant tree and 15/16 American. The strategy is to select blight-resistance genes during the backcrossing while preserving the more wild-type traits of American chestnut as the dominant phenotype. Thus, the newly bred hybrid chestnut trees should reach the same heights as the original American chestnut. Many of these 15/16 American chestnut hybrids have been planted along the East Coast, including in the Jefferson National Forest and on the Flight 93 National Memorial. Some of these sites have had researchers check on the saplings that have been planted to see their survival rate. For the hybrids to do well, they need areas with decent drainage and abundant sunlight. Meeting these needs can be hard to do, so not all restoration areas have been successful with hybrid survival.

=== Transgenic blight-resistant chestnut trees ===
A 1983 study on hypovirulence had shown that chestnut blight infected with hypovirus produced less oxalic acid when attacking the cambium. Meanwhile, a plant pathologist, Dr. William Powell, had been trying to figure out how to transfer all of the Asian chestnut's resistance genetics to its American relatives. In the 1990s, he had the idea to give up on the more complicated and larger job, and instead look around for a single gene elsewhere. (In related work, in 2001 Liang, Mayard, Allen, and Powell successfully inserted an oxalate oxidase (OxO) gene from wheat into Populus × euramericana ("Ogy") for Septoria musiva resistance. This enzyme breaks down the oxalic acid secreted by the fungus into carbon dioxide and hydrogen peroxide.) In 2007, Welch, Stipanovic, Maynard, and Powell showed that transgenic C. dentata expressing a wheat OxO indeed had lower lignin degradation by oxalic acid, and suggested this was the path to take.

A few years later this line of research culminated in the final product: Powell and another plant pathologist, Dr. Charles Maynard, working at the State University of New York College of Environmental Science and Forestry developed American chestnuts which had heightened blight resistance. Heightened resistance was attained by introducing a wheat OxO gene into the American chestnut genome. (Because an unrelated gene was transferred, this did not make the chestnut trees produce gluten, and the nuts remain gluten free.) The transgenic trees have blight resistance either equal to or surpassing that of Castanea mollissima, Chinese chestnuts. In 2013, SUNY ESF had over 100 individual events being tested, with more than 400 slated to be in the field or in the lab for various assay tests in the next several years. By 2014, more than 1,000 trees were growing in several field sites. Government approval will be required before returning any of these blight resistant trees to the wild. The New York Botanical Garden has planted several of the transgenic trees for public display. At the start, there were few such engineered chestnut trees. For seed multiplication, grafting could work. Normal tree growth requires 6, 7, or even 8 years before a chestnut will flower. However orchard management may accelerate pollen production to 2–3 years (although still without fruiting). Powell's lab had been able to use growth chambers with higher light inputs to get duration to pollen production down to less than a year.

The American Chestnut Foundation (TACF) once worked closely with SUNY ESF to utilize the Darling 58 in their mission to restore the American chestnut to its native range in the eastern United States. However, in December 2023, TACF withdrew its petition for use as a restorative species due to poor performance and high mortality in Darling 54 saplings.

== Economic and ecological impact of disease ==
In less than fifty years after its emergence, C. parasitica virtually eliminated American chestnut as a canopy species in 8.8 million acres (3.6×10^{6} ha) of forest. The chestnut fruit was a major food source for animals in the low elevation Appalachian forests. This loss resulted in a drastic decrease in the squirrel population, the extinction of seven native moth species, and the slowed recovery of deer, Cooper's hawk, cougar, and bobcat populations. The effects of this disease also rippled further through the ecosystem, being linked to a decrease in the abundance of cavity-nesting birds and to a decrease in river water quality which negatively affected aquatic invertebrate populations.

In 1912, standing chestnut timber in just three states was estimated to be $82.5 million ($1.9 billion in 2009 dollars) in value. Therefore, in addition to ecological impacts, C. parasitica potentially caused a devastating loss in economic welfare for communities dependent on the chestnut tree. Mountaineers, residents of Appalachian Mountain communities, had to drastically alter their lifestyles to cope with the effects of this disease.

Economic effects have also been considerable in Europe, particularly before CHV1 spreads naturally to a region. In Greece for example, the disease forced the migration of people who could no longer afford to live off chestnut trees. It has also led to a 40% decline in Greek chestnut production.

== See also ==
- Phytophthora cambivora
- Phytophthora katsurae
- American Chestnut Cooperators Foundation
- Darling 58
- Forest pathology
- Lists of invasive species
- Forest disturbance of invasive insects and diseases in the United States
- The Weeping Beech
- The American Chestnut Foundation
