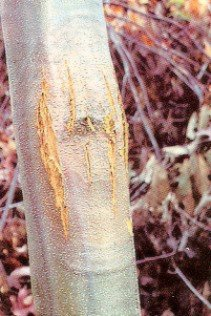
- Cankers caused by the Cryphonectria parasitica cause the bark to split.

Scientific classification
- Kingdom: Fungi
- Division: Ascomycota
- Class: Sordariomycetes
- Order: Diaporthales
- Family: Cryphonectriaceae
- Genus: Cryphonectria (Sacc.) Sacc. & D. Sacc. 1905

Species
- See text.

= Cryphonectria =

Genus of fungi

Cryphonectria is a fungal genus in the order Diaporthales. The most well-known and well-studied species in the genus is Cryphonectria parasitica, the species which causes chestnut blight. The genus was, for a time, considered synonymous with Endothia, but the two are now recognised as distinct. Taxonomic studies in 2006 limited the genus to four species, but a fifth, Cryphonectria naterciae, was described in 2011 from Portugal.

== Species ==
- Cryphonectria abscondita
- Cryphonectria acaciarum
- Cryphonectria cubensis
- Cryphonectria decipiens
- Cryphonectria japonica
- Cryphonectria macrospora
- Cryphonectria moriformis
- Cryphonectria naterciae
- Cryphonectria nitschkei
- Cryphonectria parasitica
- Cryphonectria variicolor

According to [(Murr) (And.et And.)] Chestnut blight was first discovered in North America in 1904 on Castanea dentata. By the 1940s it had killed most wild American chestnut trees, which were formerly one of the most abundant species in the eastern U.S.

The infection takes place through bark wounds. In the early stage, clear yellow-brown spots appear on the young twigs; the bark then splits open, sinks in and dies out. In the next stage the cambium layer is infected, the tree trunk becomes disformed, the split bark parts start to swell as parasitic fungus produces more peridermia and yellow colored pycnidia start to appear on the bark. Then the tree's leaves wilt and branches start dying off. The release of fungal spores lasts through the whole vegetative season.
