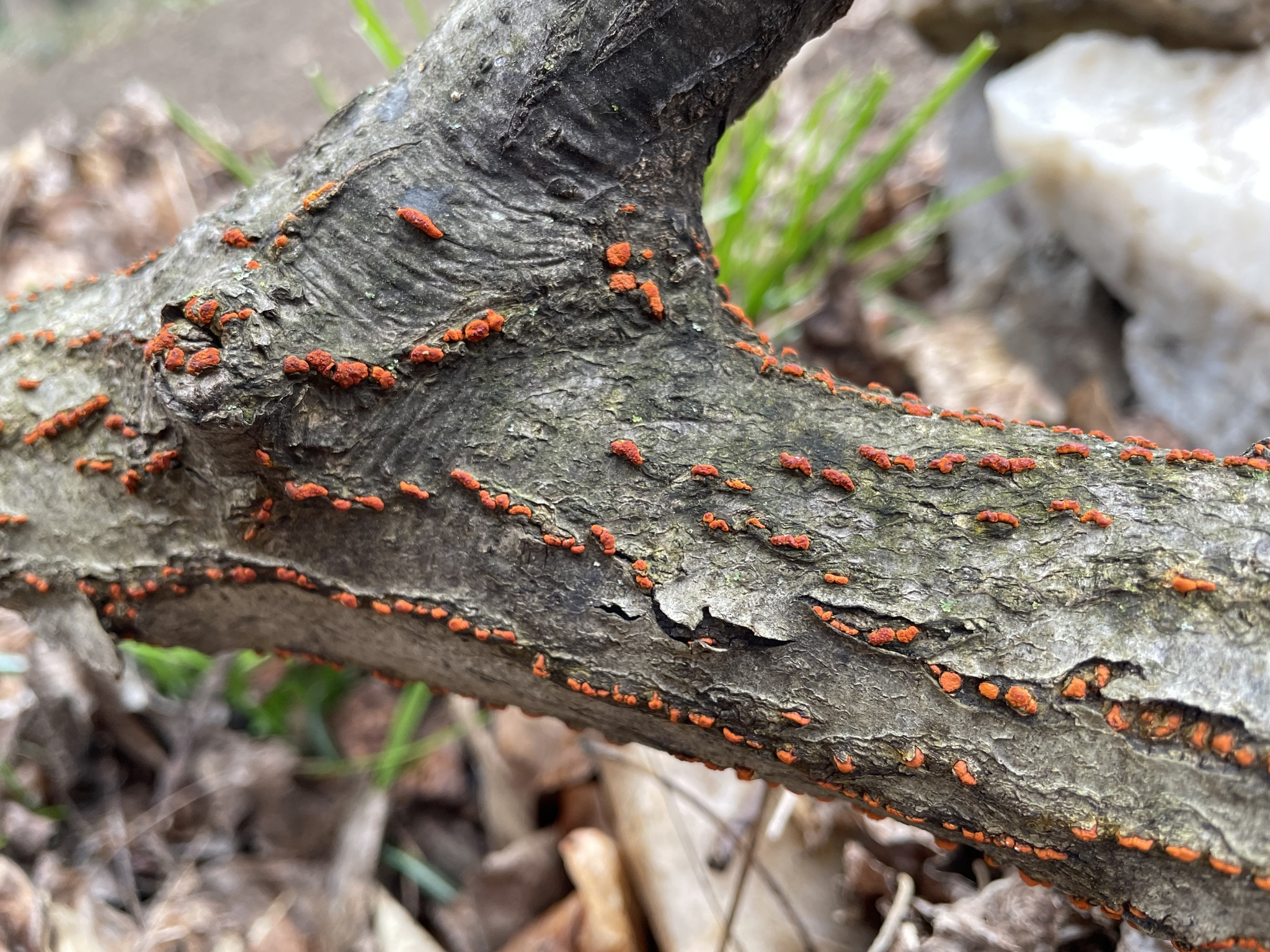
- Cankers caused by E. gyrosa

Scientific classification
- Kingdom: Fungi
- Division: Ascomycota
- Class: Sordariomycetes
- Order: Diaporthales
- Family: Cryphonectriaceae
- Genus: Endothia; Fr. (1849)

Type species
- Endothia gyrosa (Schwein.) Berk. (1860)

Species
- See text.

= Endothia =

Genus of fungi

Endothia is a genus of fungi within the family Cryphonectriaceae.

== Species ==
While many species have historically been placed in the genus Endothia, at present only four species are accepted:

- Endothia cerciana W.Wang & S.F.Chen (2022)
- Endothia chinensis C.M.Tian & N.Jiang (2019)
- Endothia gyrosa (Schwein.) Berk. (1860)
- Endothia singularis (Syd. & P.Syd.) Shear & N.E.Stevens (1917)

== See also ==
- Cryphonectria parasitica, formerly Endothia parasitica, severe blight of the American chestnut tree Castanea dentata
