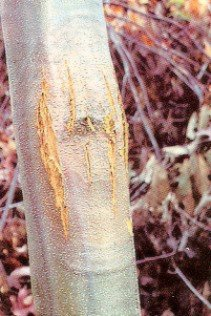
- Chestnut blight fungus

Scientific classification
- Kingdom: Fungi
- Division: Ascomycota
- Class: Sordariomycetes
- Order: Diaporthales
- Family: Cryphonectriaceae; Gryzenh. & M.J. Wingf. 2006

Type genus
- Cryphonectria (Sacc.) Sacc. & D. Sacc. 1905

= Cryphonectriaceae =

Family of fungi

Cryphonectriaceae is a family of fungi in the order Diaporthales.

== Genera ==
- Amphilogia
- Aurantiosacculus
- Aurapex
- Aurifilum
- Celoporthe
- Chrysofolia
- Chrysoporthe
- Cryphonectria
- Corticimorbus
- Cryptometrion
- Endothia
- Endothiella
- Foliocryphia
- Holocryphia
- Latruncellus
- Microthia
- Prosopidicola
- Rostraureum
- Ursicollum
