= Quercetrin =

Quercetrin may refer to:

- Quercitrin, a glycoside formed from the flavonoid quercetin and the deoxy sugar rhamnose
- Quercitron, a yellow natural dye obtained from the bark of the Eastern Black Oak (Quercus velutina), a forest tree indigenous in North America
