= List of Corthylus species =

This is a list of 194 species in Corthylus, a genus of typical bark beetles in the family Curculionidae.

== Corthylus species ==
- Corthylus abbreviatus Eichhoff, 1869a^{c}
- Corthylus abruptedeclivis Schedl, 1966f^{c}
- Corthylus additus Wood, 1974c^{c}
- Corthylus affinis Fonseca, 1927^{c}
- Corthylus alienus Schedl, 1966f^{c}
- Corthylus andinus Wood, 2007^{c}
- Corthylus annexus Wood, 2007^{c}
- Corthylus anomalus Bright, 1972a^{c}
- Corthylus antennarius Schedl, 1966f^{c}
- Corthylus araguensis Wood, 2007^{c}
- Corthylus argentinensis Schedl, 1950i^{c}
- Corthylus ater Schedl, 1952d^{c}
- Corthylus atomus Wood, 2007^{c}
- Corthylus attenuatus Wood, 2007^{c}
- Corthylus aztecus Bright, 1972a^{c}
- Corthylus bellus Wood, 2007^{c}
- Corthylus bicolor Eggers, 1943a^{c}
- Corthylus bifurcus Schedl, 1935h^{c}
- Corthylus biseriatus Eggers, 1943d^{c}
- Corthylus bituberculatus Nunberg, 1962^{c}
- Corthylus bolivianus Eggers, 1943a^{c}
- Corthylus brunnescens Wood, 1981^{c}
- Corthylus brunneus Wood, 1974c^{c}
- Corthylus calamarius Wood, 1974c^{c}
- Corthylus callidus Schedl, 1973d^{c}
- Corthylus calmicolens Wood, 1974c^{c}
- Corthylus cannularius Wood, 1974c^{c}
- Corthylus castaneus Ferrari, 1867a^{c}
- Corthylus cavifrons Nunberg, 1962^{c}
- Corthylus cecropicolens Wood, 2007^{c}
- Corthylus cecropii Wood, 1975a^{c}
- Corthylus chiriquensis Wood, 2007^{c}
- Corthylus cirrifer Wood, 2007^{c}
- Corthylus cirritus Wood, 1974c^{c}
- Corthylus cirrus Schedl, 1940a^{c}
- Corthylus coffeae Wood, 2007^{c}
- Corthylus collaris Blandford, 1904^{c}
- Corthylus columbianus Hopkins, 1894^{i c b} (Columbian timber beetle)
- Corthylus comatus Blandford, 1904^{c}
- Corthylus comitabilis Wood, 2007^{c}
- Corthylus comosus Wood, 1974c^{c}
- Corthylus compressicornis Erichson, 1836^{c}
- Corthylus concavus Bright, 1972a^{c}
- Corthylus concisus Wood, 1974c^{c}
- Corthylus confertus Wood, 2007^{c}
- Corthylus confusus Wood, 2007^{c}
- Corthylus consimilis Wood, 1974c^{c}
- Corthylus convexicauda Eggers, 1931b^{c}
- Corthylus convexifrons Wood, 1986c^{c}
- Corthylus coronatus Eggers, 1933b^{c}
- Corthylus costulatus Wood, 2007^{c}
- Corthylus crassus Wood, 2007^{c}
- Corthylus curiosus Bright, 1972d^{c}
- Corthylus cylindricus Schedl, 1963c^{c}
- Corthylus dentatus Eggers, 1943a^{c}
- Corthylus detrimentosus Schedl, 1940a^{c}
- Corthylus diligens Wood, 1974c^{c}
- Corthylus dimidiatus Ferrari, 1867a^{c}
- Corthylus discoideus Blandford, 1904^{c}
- Corthylus donaticus Wood, 1974c^{c}
- Corthylus dubiosus Wood & Bright, 1992^{c}
- Corthylus eichhoffi Schedl, 1933b^{c}
- Corthylus electinus Wood, 2007^{c}
- Corthylus emarginatus Eggers, 1943a^{c}
- Corthylus epistomalis Wood, 2007^{c}
- Corthylus equihuai Wood, 2007^{c}
- Corthylus excisus Wood & Bright, 1992^{c}
- Corthylus exiguus Wood, 1984e^{c}
- Corthylus fasciatus Erichson, 1836^{c}
- Corthylus flagellifer Blandford, 1904^{c}
- Corthylus frontalis Wood, 2007^{c}
- Corthylus fuscus Blandford, 1904^{c}
- Corthylus garai Wood, 2007^{c}
- Corthylus glabinus Bright, 1972a^{c}
- Corthylus glabratus Ferrari, 1867a^{c}
- Corthylus gracilens Wood, 2007^{c}
- Corthylus gracilior Wood, 2007^{c}
- Corthylus gracilis Wood & Bright, 1992^{c}
- Corthylus granulatus Schedl, 1935h^{c}
- Corthylus granulifer Wood, 1974c^{c}
- Corthylus guayanensis Eggers, 1933b^{c}
- Corthylus ingaensis Wood & Bright, 1992^{c}
- Corthylus insignis Wood, 1974c^{c}
- Corthylus insularis Bright & Torres, 2006^{c}
- Corthylus letzneri Wood & Bright, 1992^{c}
- Corthylus lobatus Ferrari, 1867a^{c}
- Corthylus luridus Blandford, 1904^{c}
- Corthylus lustratus Wood, 1984e^{c}
- Corthylus macrocerus Eichhoff, 1869a^{c}
- Corthylus merkli Wood, 2007^{c}
- Corthylus mexicanus Schedl, 1950i^{c}
- Corthylus micacirrus Wood, 1984e^{c}
- Corthylus minimus Wood, 1974c^{c}
- Corthylus minulus Wood, 2007^{c}
- Corthylus minutissimus Schedl, 1940a^{c}
- Corthylus minutus Bright, 1972a^{c}
- Corthylus mirabilis Nunberg, 1962^{c}
- Corthylus montanus Wood, 2007^{c}
- Corthylus nanus Wood, 1979b^{c}
- Corthylus neotardus Wood & Bright, 1992^{c}
- Corthylus nevermanni Wood, 1982b^{c}
- Corthylus niger Wood & Bright, 1992^{c}
- Corthylus nigrescens Wood, 2007^{c}
- Corthylus nigricans Wood, 2007^{c}
- Corthylus noguerai Wood, 2007^{c}
- Corthylus nolenae Wood, 1974c^{c}
- Corthylus nudipennis Schedl, 1950i^{c}
- Corthylus nudiusculus Schedl, 1950i^{c}
- Corthylus nudus Schedl, 1940a^{c}
- Corthylus obliquus Schedl, 1976a^{c}
- Corthylus obtusus Schedl, 1966f^{c}
- Corthylus oculatus Wood, 1974c^{c}
- Corthylus oliveirai Schedl, 1976a^{c}
- Corthylus panamensis Blandford, 1904^{c}
- Corthylus papuellus Wood, 2007^{c}
- Corthylus papulans Eichhoff, 1869a^{c}
- Corthylus parvicirrus Wood, 2007^{c}
- Corthylus parvulus Blandford, 1904^{c}
- Corthylus peruanus Schedl, 1950i^{c}
- Corthylus petilus Wood, 1967^{i c}
- Corthylus pharax Schedl, 1976a^{c}
- Corthylus pilifer Wood, 2007^{c}
- Corthylus pinguis Wood, 2007^{c}
- Corthylus pisinnus Bright, 1972d^{c}
- Corthylus plagiatus Eichhoff, 1869a^{c}
- Corthylus praealtus Schedl, 1976a^{c}
- Corthylus praeustus Schedl, 1950i^{c}
- Corthylus procerus Bright, 1972a^{c}
- Corthylus pseudoandinus Wood, 2007^{c}
- Corthylus pseudoexcisus Wood, 2007^{c}
- Corthylus pseudovillus Wood, 2007^{c}
- Corthylus ptyocerus Blandford, 1904^{c}
- Corthylus pumilus Wood, 1974c^{c}
- Corthylus punctatissimus (Zimmermann, 1868)^{i c b} (pitted ambrosia beetle)
- Corthylus punctatus Eggers, 1943a^{c}
- Corthylus punctifrons Wood, 2007^{c}
- Corthylus pusillus Eggers, 1943a^{c}
- Corthylus pygmaeus Wood, 1974c^{c}
- Corthylus reburrus Bright, 1972a^{c}
- Corthylus redtenbacheri Ferrari, 1867a^{c}
- Corthylus retusifer Wood, 1974c^{c}
- Corthylus retusus Wood, 1974c^{c}
- Corthylus robustus Schedl, 1936i^{c}
- Corthylus rubricollis Blandford, 1904^{c}
- Corthylus rufopilosus Eggers, 1931b^{c}
- Corthylus sanguineus Schedl, 1935h^{c}
- Corthylus schaufussi Schedl, 1937g^{c}
- Corthylus schulzi Wood, 2007^{c}
- Corthylus scutellaris LeConte, 1857^{c}
- Corthylus senticosus Wood, 1986c^{c}
- Corthylus sentosus Wood, 1986c^{c}
- Corthylus sentus Wood, 1974c^{c}
- Corthylus serratus Wood, 1974c^{c}
- Corthylus serrulatus Eggers, 1934a^{c}
- Corthylus signatus Ferrari, 1867a^{c}
- Corthylus simillimus Schedl, 1966f^{c}
- Corthylus simplex Wood, 1974c^{c}
- Corthylus simplicis Wood, 2007^{c}
- Corthylus sobrinus Wood, 1974c^{c}
- Corthylus spinifer Schwarz, 1891^{i c}
- Corthylus spinipennis Wood, 2007^{c}
- Corthylus spinosus Wood, 1974c^{c}
- Corthylus splendens Wood, 1967c^{c}
- Corthylus splendidulus Wood, 2007^{c}
- Corthylus splendidus Bright, 1972a^{c}
- Corthylus strigilatus Eggers, 1933b^{c}
- Corthylus strigilis Wood, 1974c^{c}
- Corthylus subasperatus Eggers, 1940^{g}
- Corthylus subasperulus Eggers, 1940a^{c}
- Corthylus subserratus Wood, 1974c^{c}
- Corthylus subsulcatus Schedl, 1961i^{c}
- Corthylus suturalis Eggers, 1931b^{c}
- Corthylus suturifer Schedl, 1963c^{c}
- Corthylus tardulus Wood, 1981^{c}
- Corthylus theobromae Nunberg, 1971^{c}
- Corthylus tomentosus Schedl, 1940a^{c}
- Corthylus transversus Eichhoff, 1869a^{c}
- Corthylus trucis Wood, 1974c^{c}
- Corthylus truncatiformus Wood, 2007^{c}
- Corthylus truncatus Wood, 1985^{c}
- Corthylus trunculus Wood, 1974c^{c}
- Corthylus tuberculatus Eggers, 1940a^{c}
- Corthylus tuberculifer Wood, 2007^{c}
- Corthylus tuberosus Wood, 2007^{c}
- Corthylus tulcanus Hagedorn, 1910b^{c}
- Corthylus uniseptis Schedl, 1961i^{c}
- Corthylus ustus Wood, 2007^{c}
- Corthylus venustus Wood & Bright, 1992^{c}
- Corthylus villifer Wood, 1974c^{c}
- Corthylus villosus Eggers, 1943a^{c}
- Corthylus villus Bright, 1972a^{c}
- Corthylus vochysiae Wood, 2007^{c}
- Corthylus zelus Wood, 1974c^{c}
- Corthylus zulmae Wood, 2007^{c}

Data sources: i = ITIS, c = Catalogue of Life, g = GBIF, b = Bugguide.net
