= C17H16O9 =

The molecular formula C_{17}H_{16}O_{9} (molar mass: 364.30 g/mol, exact mass: 364.0794 u) may refer to:

- Quercitannic acid
- Bergaptol-O-beta-D-glucopyranoside
