= C18H18O8 =

The molecular formula C_{18}H_{18}O_{8} (exact mass : 362.10016755) may refer to:

- Crotepoxide ((+)-Crotepoxide, CAS : 20421-13-0), a compound found in Kaempferia rotunda, Piper attenuatum, Piper kadsura or Croton macrostachys
- 2,3-Dihydroirigenin (CAS : 372104-59-1), a compound found in Belamcanda chinensis
- Flagranone B (CAS : 255064-42-7), a compound found in Duddingtonia flagrans
- Kinotannic acid, a tannin-type compound found in kino gum
- Methyl asterrate (CAS : 59170-17-1), a compound found in Ruprechtia tangarana or Aspergillus sp.
- Morintrifolin B (CAS : 1004987-19-2), a compound found in Morinda citrifolia
- 5,7,3'-Trihydroxy-6,4',5'-trimethoxyflavanone (CAS : 310888-07-4), a compound found in Greigia sphacelata
