= Cinchotannic acid =

Identifiers

Properties
Chemical formula	C_{28}H_{19}O_{17} (?)
- Except where otherwise noted, data are given for materials in their standard state (at 25 °C [77 °F], 100 kPa). verify (what is ?) Infobox references

Cinchotannic acid is a tannin contained in many cinchona barks, which by oxidation rapidly yields a dark-coloured phlobaphene called red cinchonic, cinchono-fulvic acid or cinchona red.
