= Kino (botany) =

Plant exudate

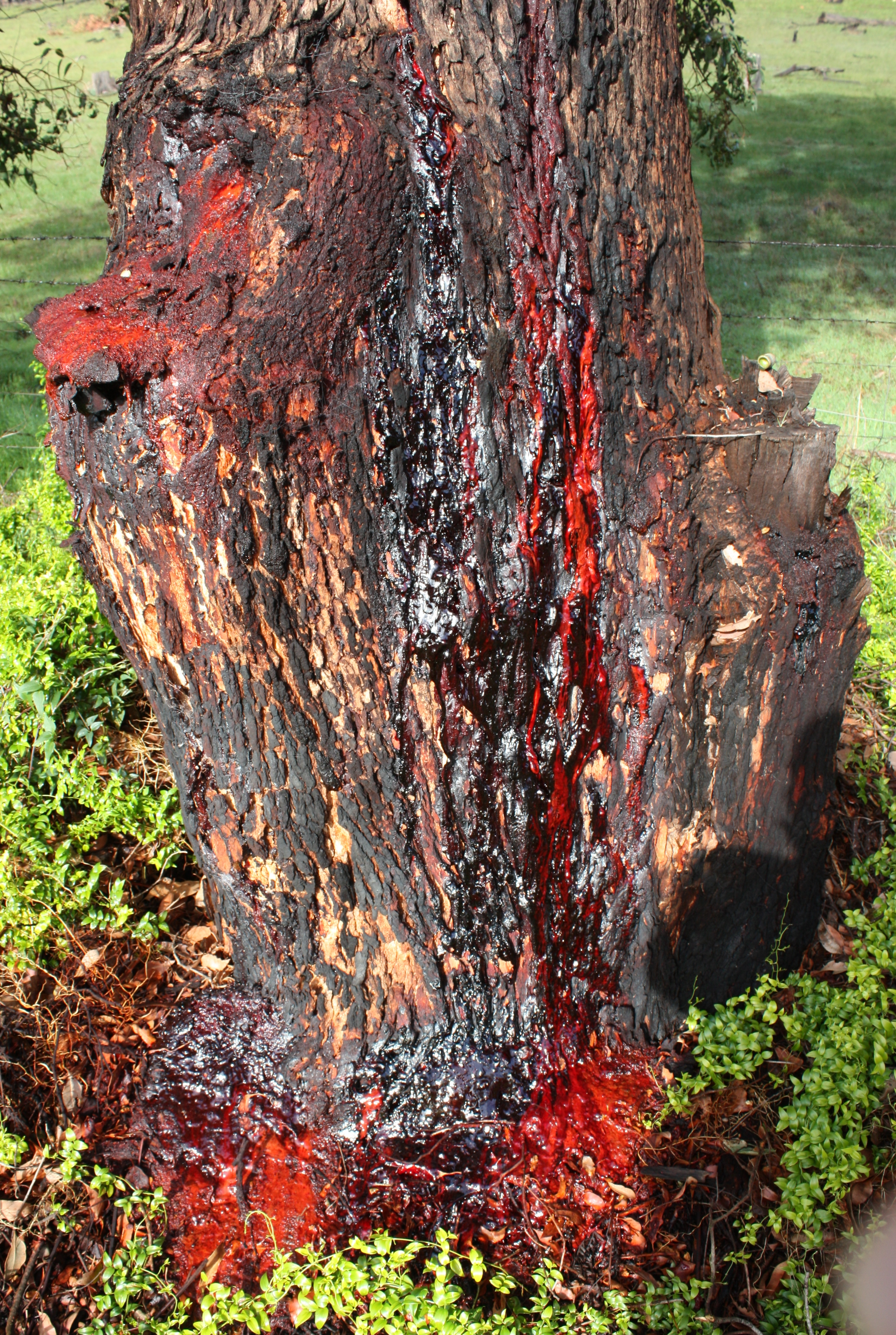
Copious flow of kino from a wound near the base of the trunk of a marri (Corymbia calophylla)

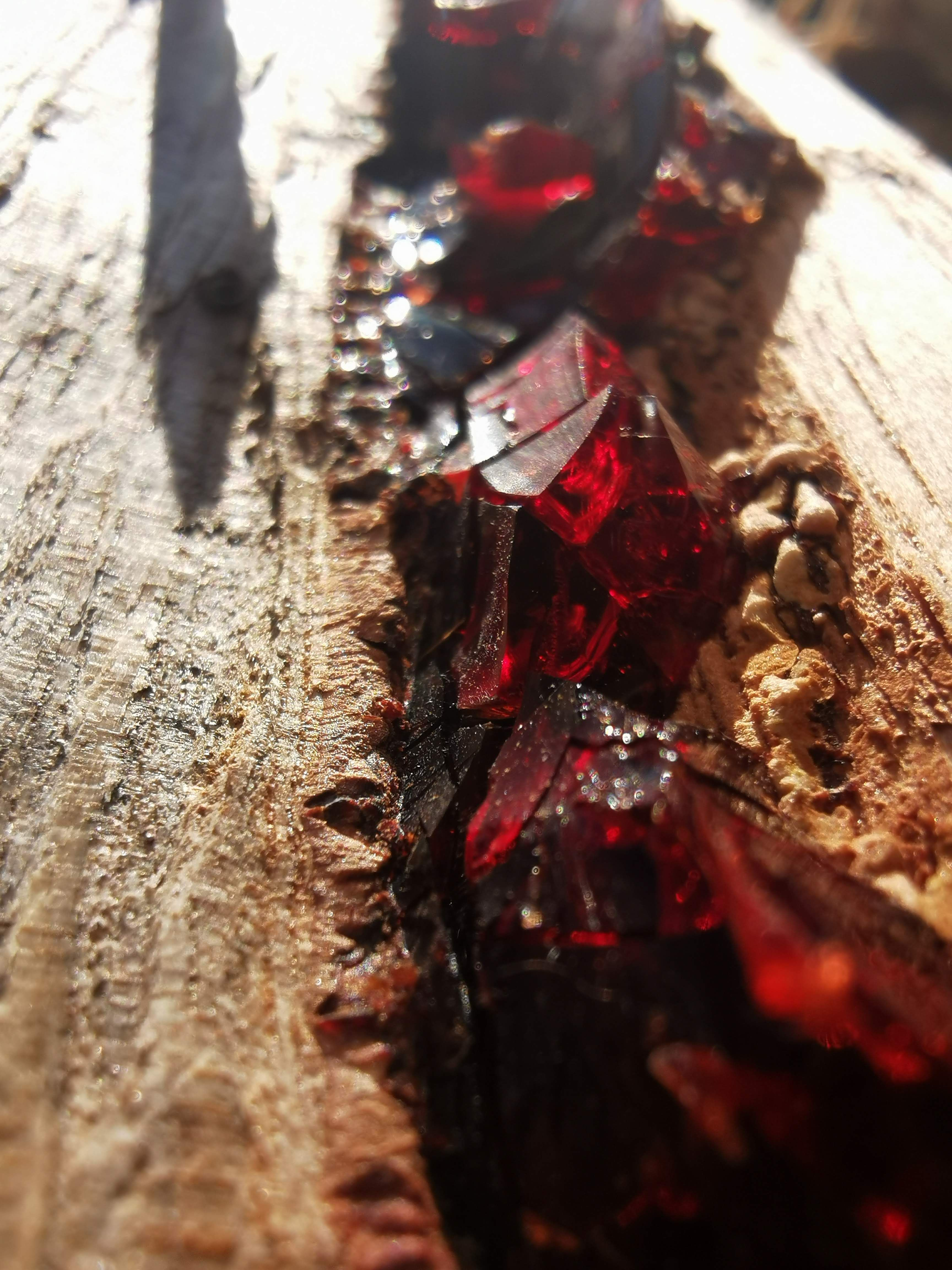
Kino sap solidified inside damaged eucalyptus log

Kino is an exudate produced by various trees and other plants, particularly bloodwood species of eucalypts (Angophora, Corymbia, Eucalyptus) and Pterocarpus, in reaction to mechanical damage, and which can be tapped by incisions made in the trunk or stalk. Many Eucalyptus, Angophora and Corymbia species are commonly referred to as 'bloodwoods', as the kino usually oozes out a very dark red colour. Kino flow in angiosperms contrasts with resin flow in conifers.

== Etymology ==
The word kino may be of Indian origin. It may also be of West African origin, as it was first introduced introduced to European medicine in 1757 by John Fothergill who brought it from the river Gambia and sold it in England as Gummi rubrum astringens gambiense. It was obtained from Pterocarpus erinaceus, called keno or genu in the local Mandinka language.

In Australia, "red gum" is a term for kino from bloodwood trees and red acaroid resin from Xanthorrhoea spp. Despite often called "gum", it is not technically a gum.

== Composition ==
Astringent tannin compounds are a major active component of kinos. The chief constituent of kino is kinotannic acid, of which it contains 70 to 80 per cent. It also contains kino red, a phlobaphene produced from kinotannic acid by oxidation. Kino also yields kinoin, a crystalline neutral principle.

In cold water it is only partially dissolved, leaving a pale flocculent residue which is soluble in boiling water but deposited again upon cooling. It is soluble in alcohol and caustic alkalis, but not in ether.

When exuding from the tree, it resembles red-currant jelly, but hardens in a few hours after exposure to the air and sun. Kinos typically dry to an amber-like material. It consists of dark red angular fragments, rarely larger than a pea. Of the small angular glistening fragments, the smaller are reddish, and the larger are almost black; thin pieces are ruby red. It is brittle and easily powdered. It has no smell, but a very astringent taste.

== Applications and sources ==
Kinos are used in medicine, tanning, and as dyes. The first kino introduced to European medicine in 1757 was obtained from Pterocarpus erinaceus. In the early 20th century, the drug recognized as the legitimate kind was East Indian, Malabar or Amboyna kino which is the evaporated juice obtained from incisions in the trunk of Pterocarpus marsupium. In addition to kinos from these two species, Bengal or Butea kino from Butea frondosa and Australian, Botany Bay, or Eucalyptus kino from Eucalyptus siderophloia and Eucalyptus camaldulensis, were imported into the United States. A West Indian or Jamaica kino is believed to be the product of Coccoloba uvifera, or seaside grape. It is possible that the same plant is the source of the South American kino.

Kino is not absorbed at all from the stomach and only very slowly from the intestine. The drug was frequently used in diarrhoea, its value being due to the relative insolubility of kinotannic acid, which enabled it to affect the lower part of the intestine. In this respect it is similar to catechu. It ceased being used as a gargle when antiseptics became recognized as the rational treatment for sore throat. A medicinal tincture of kino was used as a gargle for the relaxation of the uvula; it contained kino, glycerin, alcohol, and water.

As they are usually soluble in water, kinos found use in traditional remedies: Eucalyptus kino is used by Aboriginal Australians in a tea for treating colds.

Kino was employed to a considerable extent in the East Indies as a cotton dye, giving to the cotton the yellowish-brown color known as nankeen.

== Bibliography ==
- Kino (East Indian, Malabar, Madras, Or Cochin Kino) on chestofbooks.com
