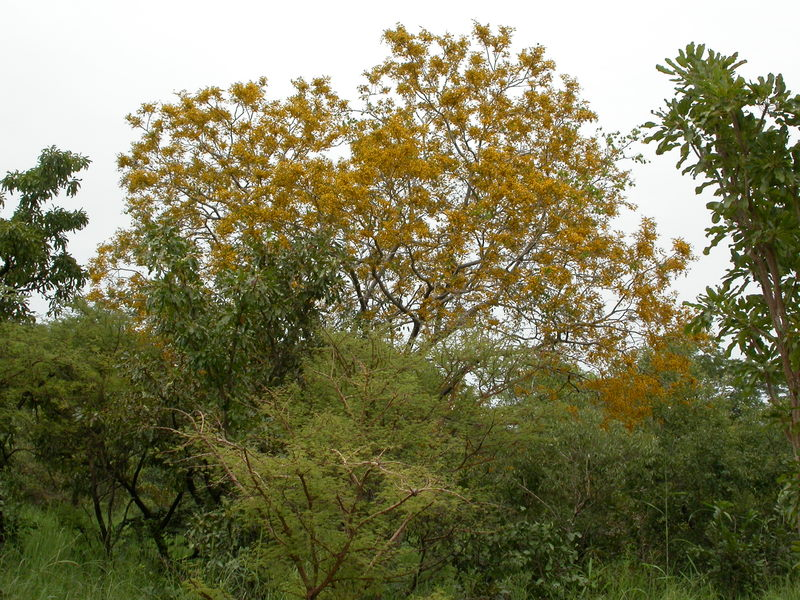

Conservation status
- Endangered (IUCN 3.1)

Scientific classification
- Kingdom: Plantae
- Clade: Tracheophytes
- Clade: Angiosperms
- Clade: Eudicots
- Clade: Rosids
- Order: Fabales
- Family: Fabaceae
- Subfamily: Faboideae
- Genus: Pterocarpus
- Species: P. erinaceus

Binomial name
- Pterocarpus erinaceus Poir.

= Pterocarpus erinaceus =

Species of legume

Pterocarpus erinaceus is an endangered tree species native to the Sahelian region of West Africa. It is listed in Appendix II of the Convention on International Trade in Endangered Species of Wild Fauna and Flora. It is used for fuel wood, for medicinal purposes, as a woodworking material, and is useful as a nitrogen-fixing plant to improve nutrient-depleted farming land. It has several common names, including kosso, barwood, African kino tree, muninga, and vène; mukwa is used for this species as well as other Pterocarpus. Groves of the tree can be found on the savannahs of West Africa, but it is becoming increasingly rare and is sometimes cultivated. The tree also grows in forests of Comoé National Park in Côte d'Ivoire, a region geographically close to the Sahel but with a higher moisture regime due to its location between two large rivers. Also, the tree grows in abundance in Kurmi Local Govt. of Taraba State in Nigeria. The tree grows to about 11 meters in height on average, and bears dark, scaly bark and yellow flowers. The fruits are winged pods. P. erinaceus grows well on sunny, hot African plains with long dry seasons and frequent fires.

The wood, which varies from yellowish to rosy reds and rich browns, is valued for woodworking, and makes good charcoal and fuel wood. The tree exudes a red sap called kino, which is used as a dye in tanning and cloth-making. As a legume, the tree harbors rhizobia that return nitrogen to the soil, making it more fertile. Such plants are desirable on farmland. In addition, the foliage is a nutritious fodder for farm animals. Mali has an active market for P. erinaceus foliage, which is in high demand by sheep farmers for fodder. The tree has several medicinal uses, including reduction of fever and cough suppression.

Pterocarpus erinaceus is one of the traditional djembe woods. It is also the only wood used to make the keys and part of the frame of the balafon and is the most common wood used to make the neck of the kora.

Pterocarpus erinaceus was brought to Europe in the 19th century by the Scottish explorer Mungo Park. Currently, it is a threatened due to overexploitation, environmental degradation, and climatic changes. However, the tree is somewhat prolific and easy to cultivate, so reforestation efforts have shown some success.

Other names for the tree include bani in Fulfulde, tolo in Djerma, wén in Wolof and ban in Serer.
