= Phlobaphene =

- Chemical structure of phlobaphenes, where R = H, OH, or OCH_{3}

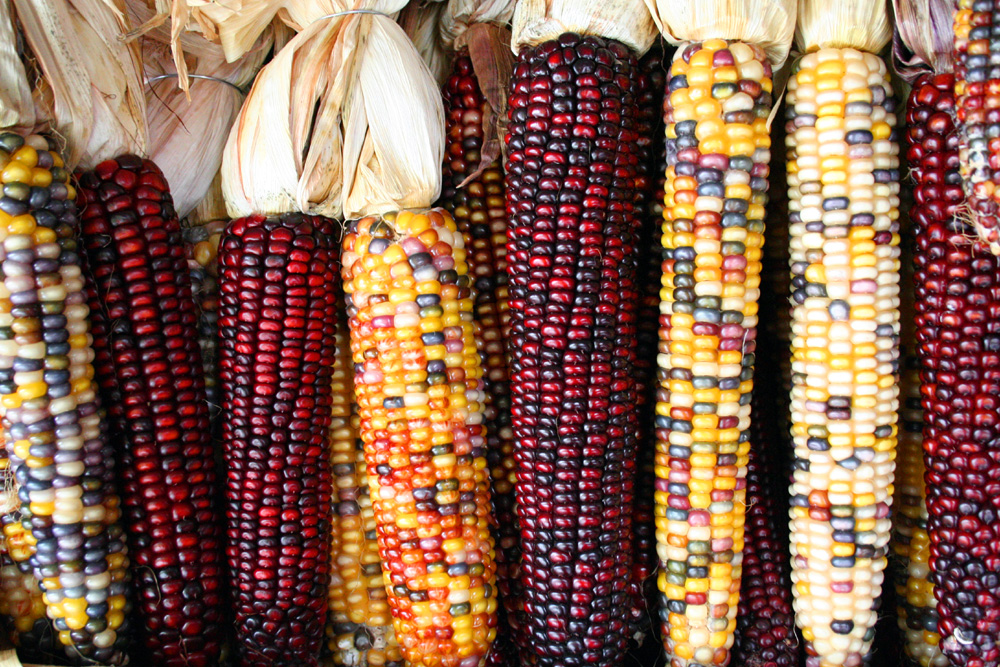
- Phlobaphene is the red pigment in the pericarp of certain maize varieties

Identifiers
CAS Number	71663-19-9

Properties
Chemical formula	Variable
Molar mass	Variable
Appearance	Red solid
Solubility in water	Insoluble
- Except where otherwise noted, data are given for materials in their standard state (at 25 °C [77 °F], 100 kPa). Infobox references

Phlobaphenes (or phlobaphens) are reddish, alcohol-soluble and water-insoluble phenolic substances. They can be extracted from plants, or be the result from treatment of tannin extracts with mineral acids (tanner's red). The name phlobaphen come from the Greek roots φλoιὀς (phloios) meaning bark and βαφή (baphe) meaning dye.

No biological activities have currently been reported for phlobaphenes. They are converted into humins in soils.

== Naturally formed phlobaphenes ==
Natural phlobaphenes are the common bark, pericarp, cob glume and seed coat (testa) pigments. They have not been found in flowers, unless the brown and black pigments in the involucrum of certain compositae are found to be of the phlobaphene type.

In bark, phlobaphenes accumulate in the phellem layer of cork cambium, part of the suberin mixture.

=== Occurrences ===
Many cinchona barks contain a particular tannin, cinchotannic acid, which by oxidation rapidly yields a dark-coloured phlobaphene called red cinchonic, cinchono-fulvic acid or cinchona red.

They are common in redwoods barks like Sequoia sempervirens or in oak barks where the chief constituent, quercitannic acid, a molecule also present in quercitron, is an unstable substance, having a tendency to give off water to form anhydrides (phlobaphenes), one of which is called oak-red (C_{28}H_{22}O_{11}).

Cuscuta europaea L., the European dodder, is reported to contain 30,000 ppm in the root.

Phlobaphenes can be extracted from the root of the common tormentil (Potentilla erecta) as tormentil red.

Phlobaphens can be found in the kola nut (where they are called kola red), chocolate liquor (called cocoa red), or in the red skins or testa of the peanut. They are also reported in the fruits of the genus Crataegus (Fructus Crataegi) or can be extracted from hop flowers.

The chief constituent of kino is kinotannic acid, of which it contains 70 to 80 per cent. It also contains kino red, a phlobaphene produced from kinotannic acid by oxidation.

Phlobaphenes are not present in the model plant Arabidopsis thaliana but can be studied as the pigment responsible for the red color in some monocot cereals, including wheat, maize or sorghum.

Sources of phlobaphenes

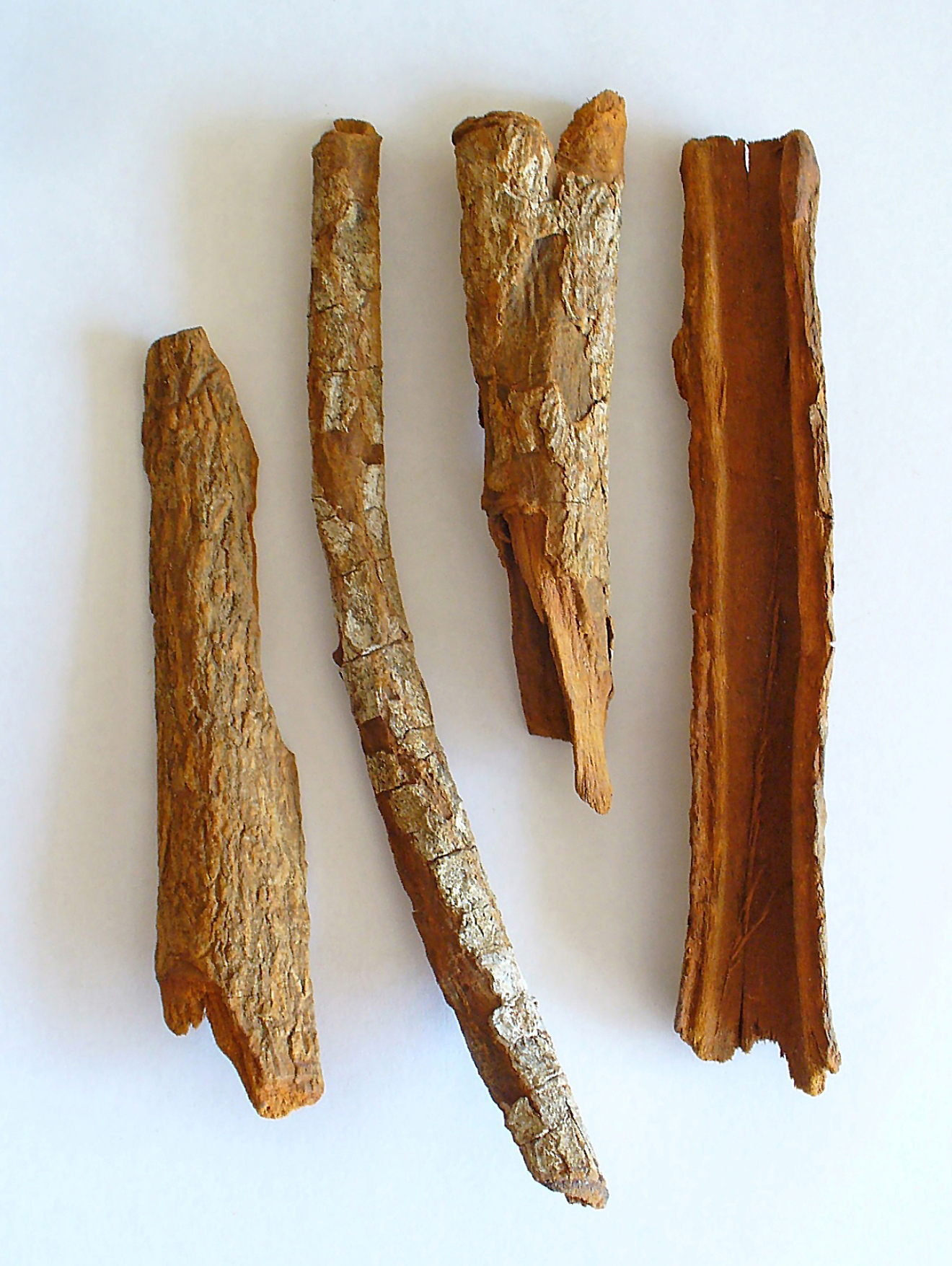
Cinchona officinalis bark

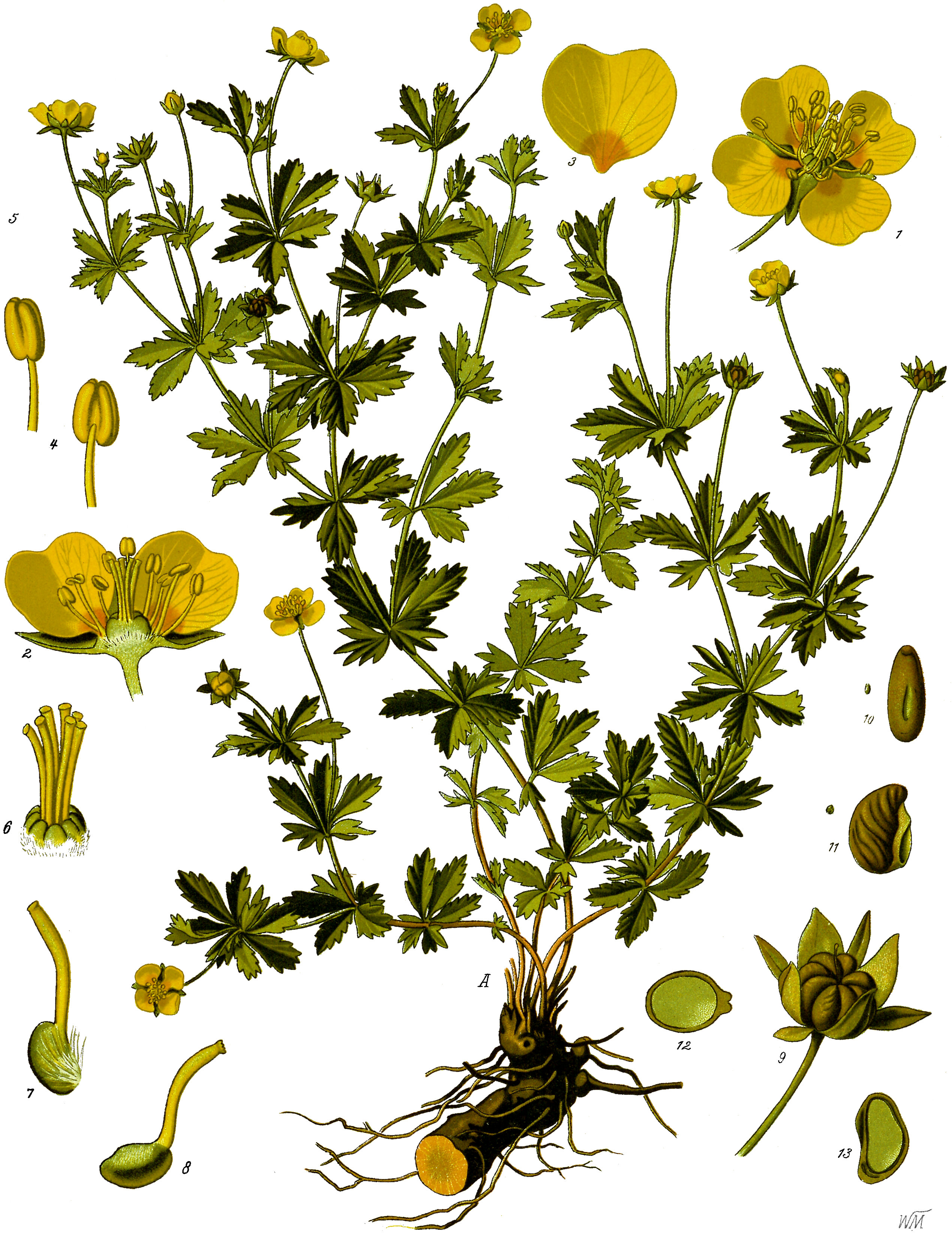
Common tormentil (Potentilla erecta)

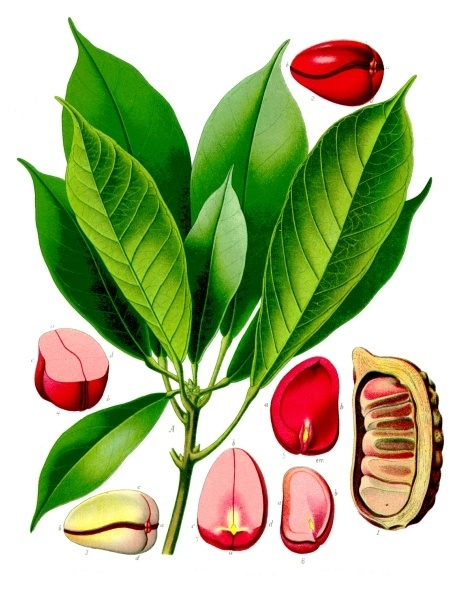
Kola nut

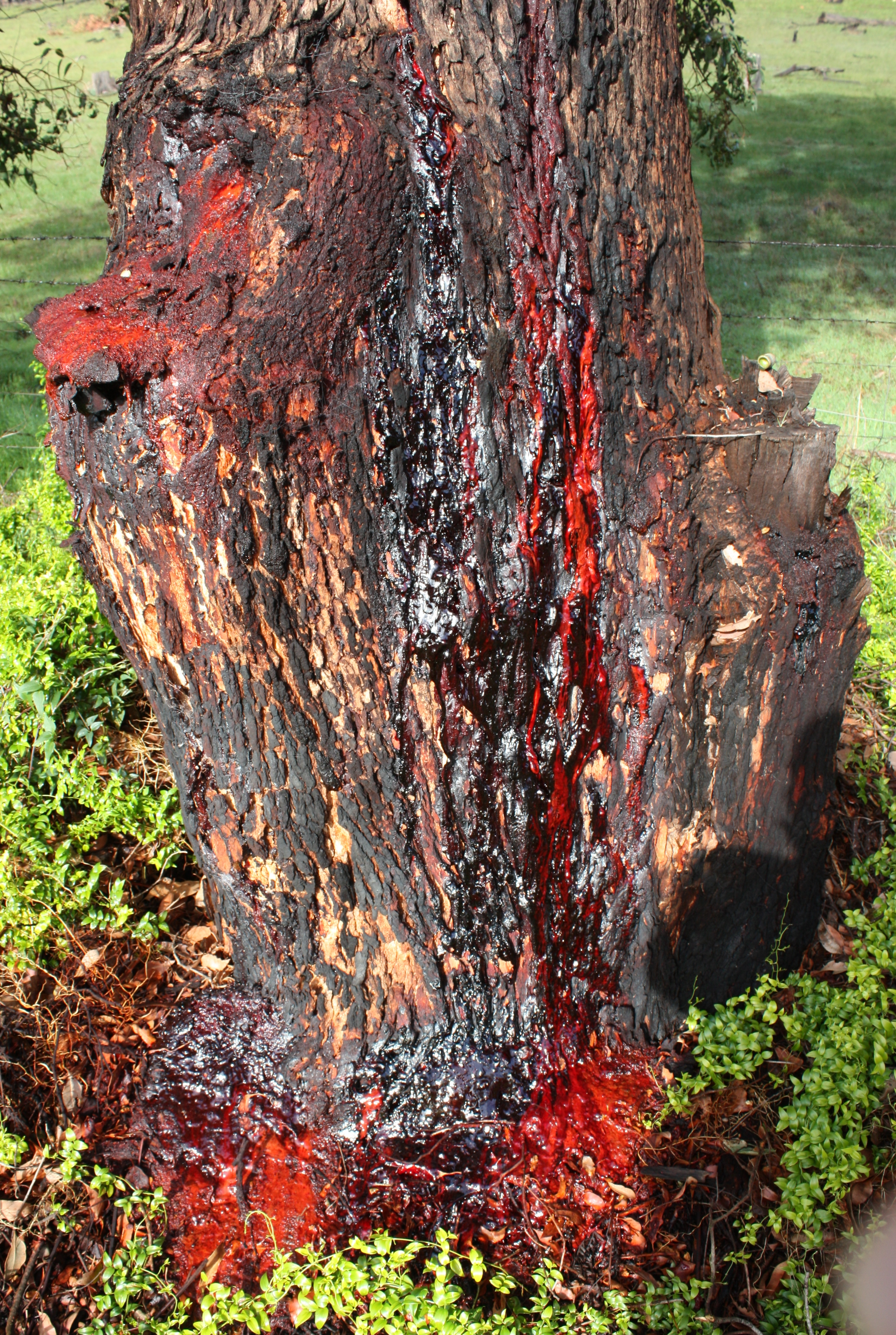
Copious flow of kino from a wound near the base of the trunk of Corymbia calophylla

=== Biosynthesis ===
In maize, phlobaphenes are synthesized in the flavonoids synthetic pathway from polymerisation of flavan-4-ols by the expression of maize pericarp color1 (p1) gene which encodes an R2R3 myb-like transcriptional activator of the A1 gene encoding for the dihydroflavonol 4-reductase (reducing dihydroflavonols into flavan-4-ols) while another gene (Suppressor of Pericarp Pigmentation 1 or SPP1) acts as a suppressor. The p1 gene encodes an Myb-homologous transcriptional activator of genes required for biosynthesis of red phlobaphene pigments, while the P1-wr allele specifies colorless kernel pericarp and red cobs, and unstable factor for orange1 (Ufo1) modifies P1-wr expression to confer pigmentation in kernel pericarp, as well as vegetative tissues, which normally do not accumulate significant amounts of phlobaphene pigments. The maize P gene encodes a Myb homolog that recognizes the sequence CCT/AACC, in sharp contrast with the C/TAACGG bound by vertebrate Myb proteins.

In the sorghum, the corresponding yellow seed 1 gene (y1) also encodes a R2R3 type of Myb domain protein that regulates the expression of chalcone synthase, chalcone isomerase and dihydroflavonol reductase genes required for the biosynthesis of 3-deoxyflavonoids.

== Chemically formed phlobaphenes ==
It is a dark-colored resin-like substance made of water-insoluble, alcohol-soluble polymers.

Phlobaphens can be formed under action of acids or heating of condensed tannins or of the fraction of tannins called phlobatannins. Water containing soda can be used for the conversion of hop tannins into phlobaphens. When heated with hydrochloric acid, tannins in cocoa solids yield a glucose and a phlobaphene.

Ordinary or warm soluble quebracho (also known as insoluble quebracho) is the natural extract obtained directly from the quebracho wood. This type of extract is rich in condensed tannins of natural high molecular weight (phlobaphenes), which are not easily soluble. Its use is therefore limited to small additions during sole leather tannage carried out in hot liquors (temperature above 35 °C) to improve the yield and the water-proofness of the leather. The cold soluble extracts are obtained by subjecting the ordinary extract to a sulfiting process which transforms the phlobaphenes into completely soluble tannins. The cold soluble quebracho extracts are the most universally known and used types. The main properties of these extracts are: a very rapid penetration, a high tannin content and a relatively low percentage of non-tannins. The rather low acid and medium salt content characterise them as mild tanning extracts (low astringency).

Phlobaphenes formation (tannins condensation and precipitation) can be minimized in using strong nucleophiles, such as phloroglucinol, m-phenylenediamine and urea, during pine tannins extraction.

The use of synthetic tannin neradol D can help solubilize phlobaphene in tanning solutions.
