= Quercitannic acid =

Names
- Other names Quercitannin; Oak bark tannin Quercotannic acid Querci-tannic acid Querco-tannic acid

Identifiers

Properties
| Chemical formula | several, see text |
| Appearance | yellowish brown amorphous substance |
- Except where otherwise noted, data are given for materials in their standard state (at 25 °C [77 °F], 100 kPa). Infobox references

Quercitannic acid is one of the two forms of tannic acid found in oak bark and leaves. The other form is called gallotannic acid and is found in oak galls.

The quercitannic acid molecule is also present in quercitron, a yellow dye obtained from the bark of the Eastern black oak (Quercus velutina), a forest tree indigenous in North America. It is described as a yellowish brown amorphous substance.

In 1838, Jöns Jacob Berzelius wrote that quercitannate is used to dissolve morphine.

In 1865 in the fifth volume of "A dictionary of chemistry", Henry Watts wrote :

It exhibits with ferric salts the same reactions as gallotannic acid. It differs however from the latter in not being convertible into gallic acid, and not yielding pyrogallic acid by dry distillation. It is precipitated by sulfuric acid in red flocks. (Stenhouse, Ann. Ch. Pharm. xlv. 16.)
According to Rochleder (ibid lxiii. 202), the tannic acid of black tea is the same as that of oak-bark.

In 1880, Etti gave for it the molecular formula C_{17}H_{16}O_{9}. He described it as an unstable substance, having a tendency to give off water to form anhydrides (called phlobaphenes), one of which is called oak-red (C_{34}H_{30}O_{17}). For him, it was not a glycoside.

In Allen’s "Commercial Organic Analysis", published in 1912, the formula given was C_{19}H_{16}O_{10}.

Other authors gave other molecular formulas like C_{28}H_{26}O_{15}, while another formula found is C_{28}H_{24}O_{11}.

According to Lowe, two forms of the principle exist – one soluble in water, of the formula C_{28}H_{28}O_{14}, and the other scarcely soluble, C_{28}H_{24}O_{12}. Both are changed by the loss of water into oak red, C_{28}H_{22}O_{11}.

Quercitannic acid was for a time a standard used to assess the phenolic content in spices, given as quercitannic acid equivalent.
