= Quercitrinase =

quercitrinase

Identifiers
- EC no.: 3.2.1.40
- CAS no.: 37288-47-4

Databases
- IntEnz: IntEnz view
- BRENDA: BRENDA entry
- ExPASy: NiceZyme view
- KEGG: KEGG entry
- MetaCyc: metabolic pathway
- PRIAM: profile
- PDB structures: RCSB PDB PDBe PDBsum
- Gene Ontology: AmiGO / QuickGO
Search
- PMC: articles
- PubMed: articles
- NCBI: proteins

The enzyme quercitrinase (EC 3.2.1.40, formerly 3.2.1.66) catalyzes the following chemical reaction:

quercitrin + H_{2}O $\rightleftharpoons$ L-rhamnose + quercetin

Thus, the two substrates of this enzyme are quercitrin and H_{2}O, whereas its two products are L-rhamnose and quercetin.

This enzyme belongs to the family of hydrolases, specifically those glycosidases that hydrolyse O- and S-glycosyl compounds. The systematic name of this enzyme class is quercitrin 3-L-rhamnohydrolase.

The enzyme can be found in Aspergillus flavus. It is an enzyme in the rutin catabolic pathway.
