= Tanbark =

Tree bark used for tanning

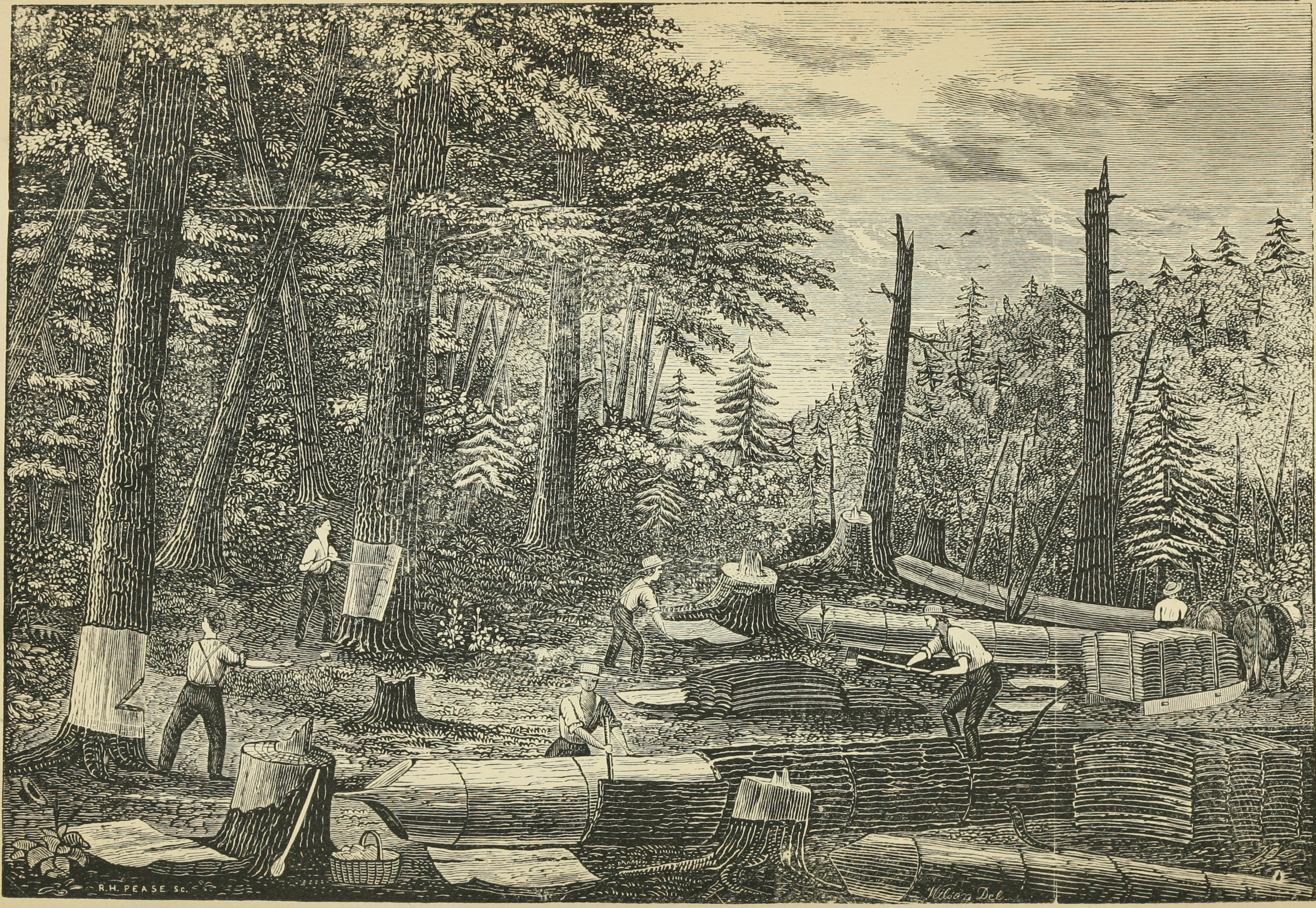
Workers peeling hemlock bark for the tannery in Prattsville, New York, United States

Tanbark is the bark of certain species of trees, traditionally used for tanning hides into leather.

The words "tannin", "tanning", "tan," and "tawny" are derived from the Medieval Latin tannare, "to convert into leather."

Bark mills are horse- or oxen-driven or water-powered edge mills and were used in earlier times to shred the tanbark to derive tannins for the leather industry. A "barker" was a person who stripped bark from trees to supply bark mills.

== Tanbark around the world ==
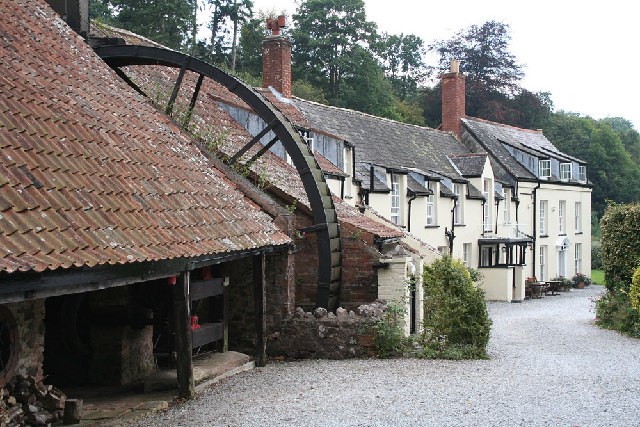
Waterwheel at Combe House Hotel in Holford, Somerset, England. The overshot waterwheel was cast by Bridgwater ironfounder H Culverwell & Co in 1892 to replace an earlier wheel. It was used to grind oak bark for the tannery complex established here in the 1840s by James Hayman. When the tannery closed in 1900, the waterwheel was adapted to other uses, such as grinding grain for grist, cutting chaff, chopping apples for the cider press, and generating electricity. It also cracked stones in a nearby quarry. The gearing survives, too.

In Europe, oak is a common source of tanbark. Quercitannic acid is the chief constituent found in oak barks. The bark is taken from young branches and twigs in oak coppices and can be up to 4 mm thick; it is grayish-brown on the outside and brownish-red on the inner surface.

In some areas of the United States, such as central Pennsylvania and northern California, "mulch" is often called tanbark, even by manufacturers and distributors. In these areas, the word "mulch" may refer to peat moss or to very fine tanbark. In California, Notholithocarpus densiflorus (commonly known as the tanoak or tanbark-oak) was used. In America, condensed tannins are also present in the bark of blackjack oak (Quercus marilandica). In New York, on the slopes of Mount Tremper, hemlock bark was a major source of tanbark during the 19th century.

Around the Mediterranean Sea, sumach (Rhus coriaria) leaves and bark are used.

In Africa and Australia, acacia (called "wattle") bark is used by tanners. One ton of wattle or mimosa bark produces about 150 lbs of pure tannin. Used tanbark is employed in horticulture and spread on flower beds and in glass houses to keep down weeds and protect plant roots.

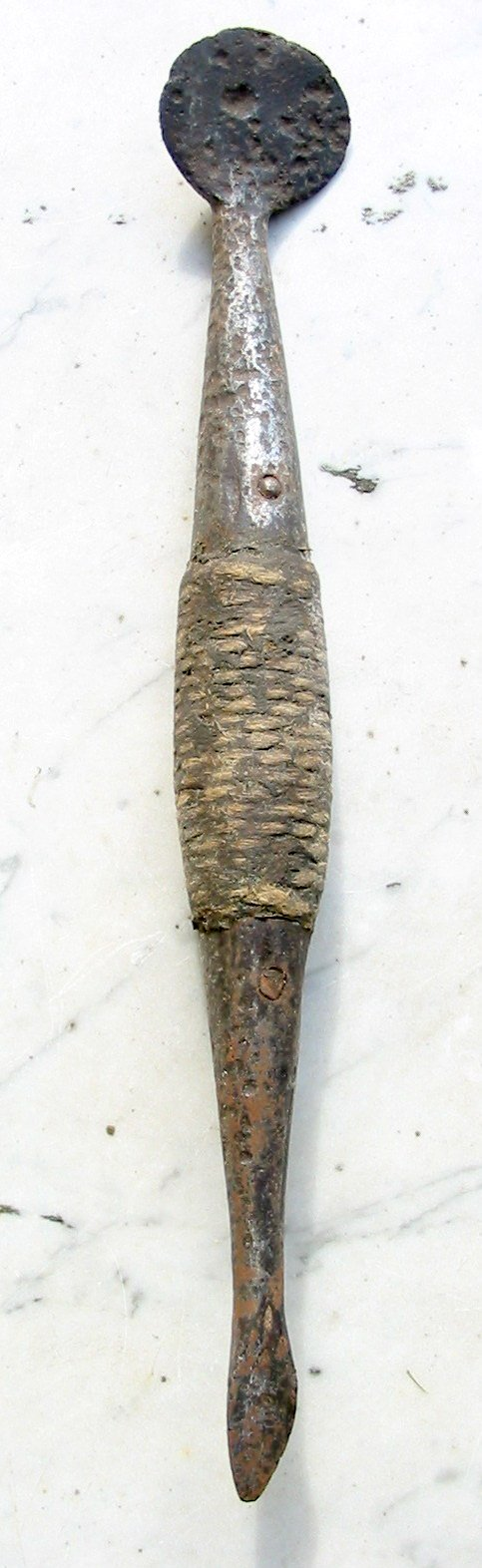
A bark spud (German: lohlöffel, lit. 'bark spoon'), used to remove bark from oak branches

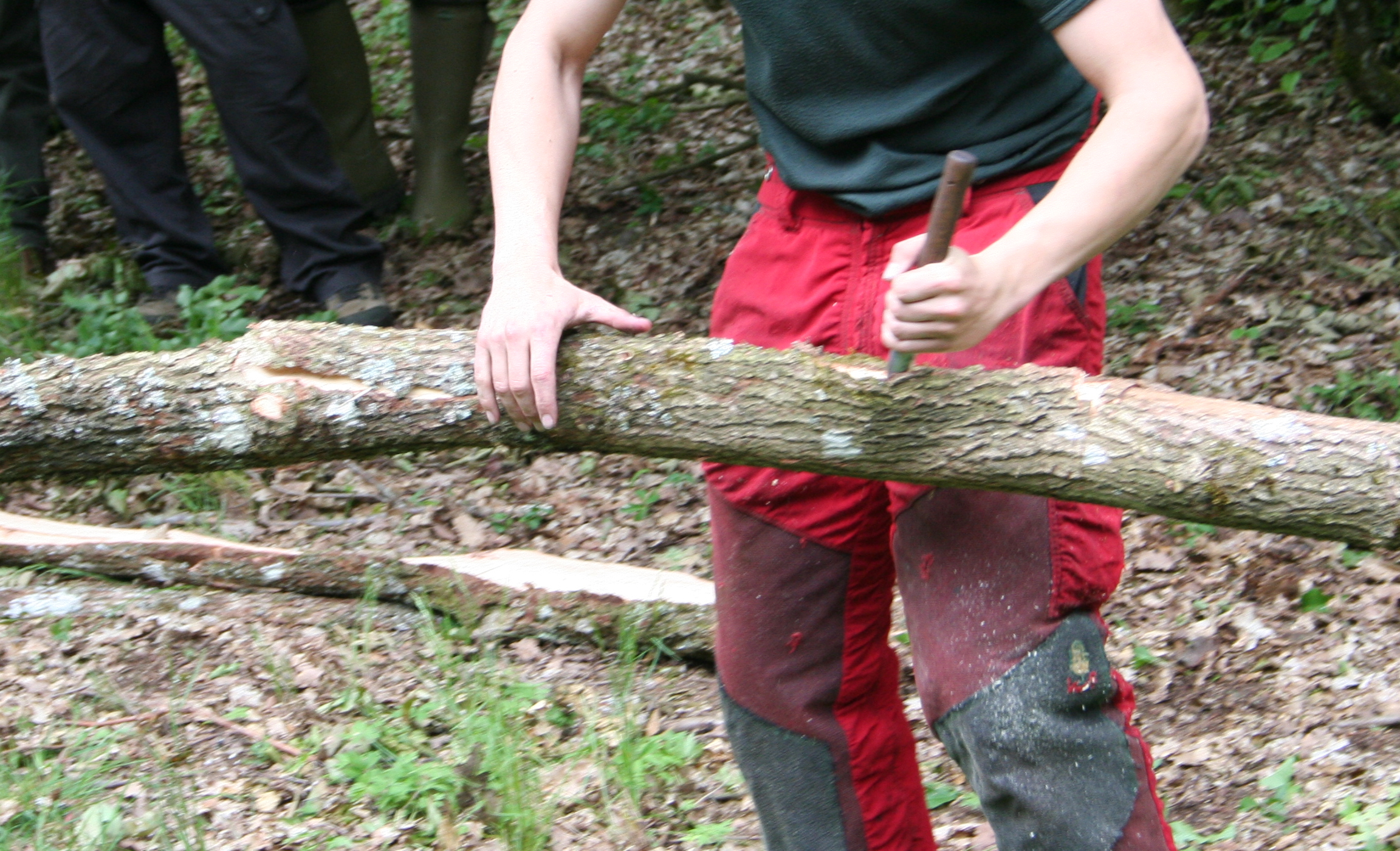
Removal of bark from oak branches

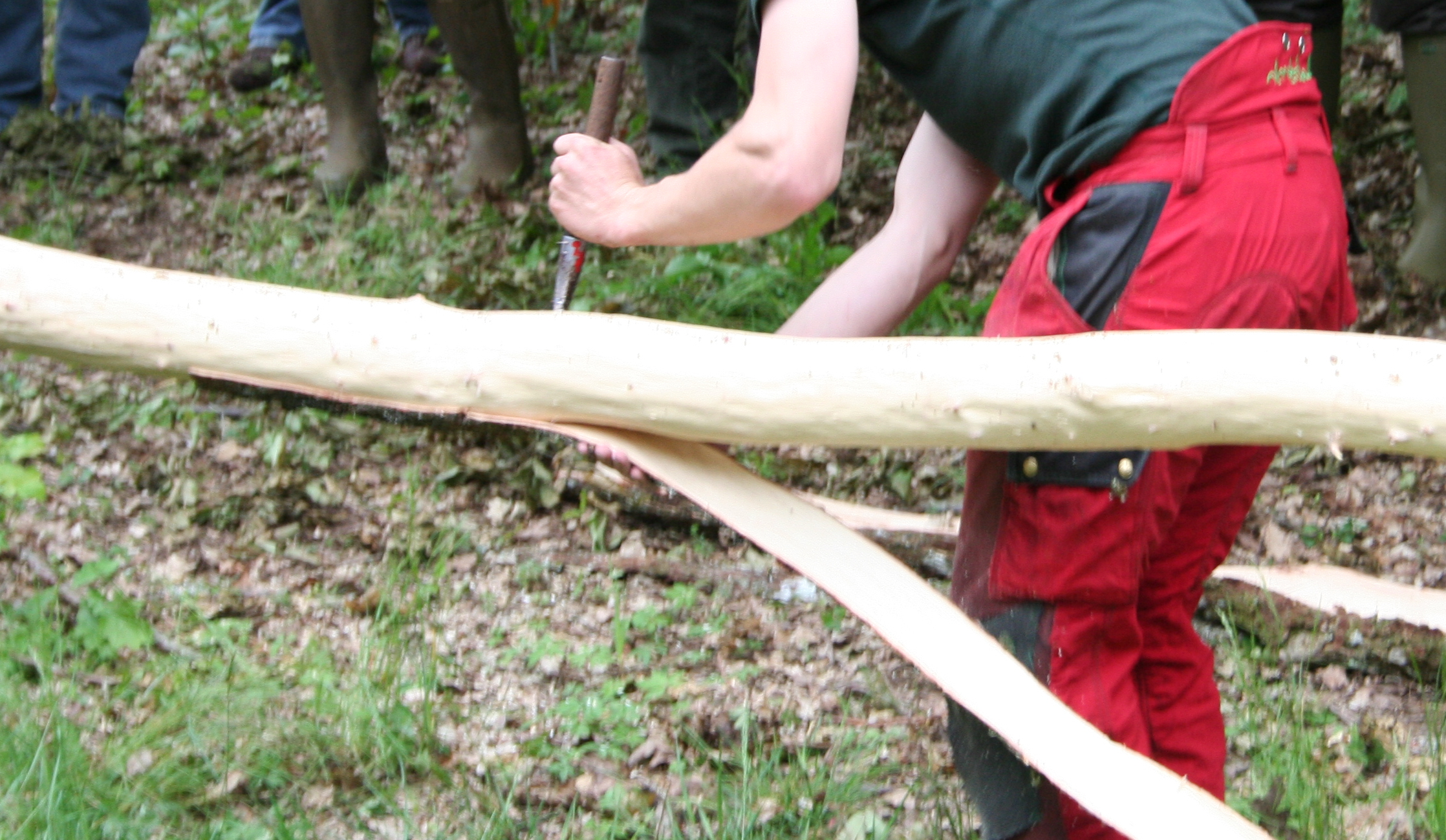
Another view of the process

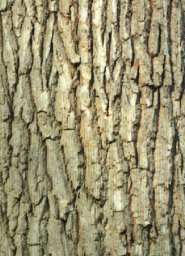
The bark of an oak tree

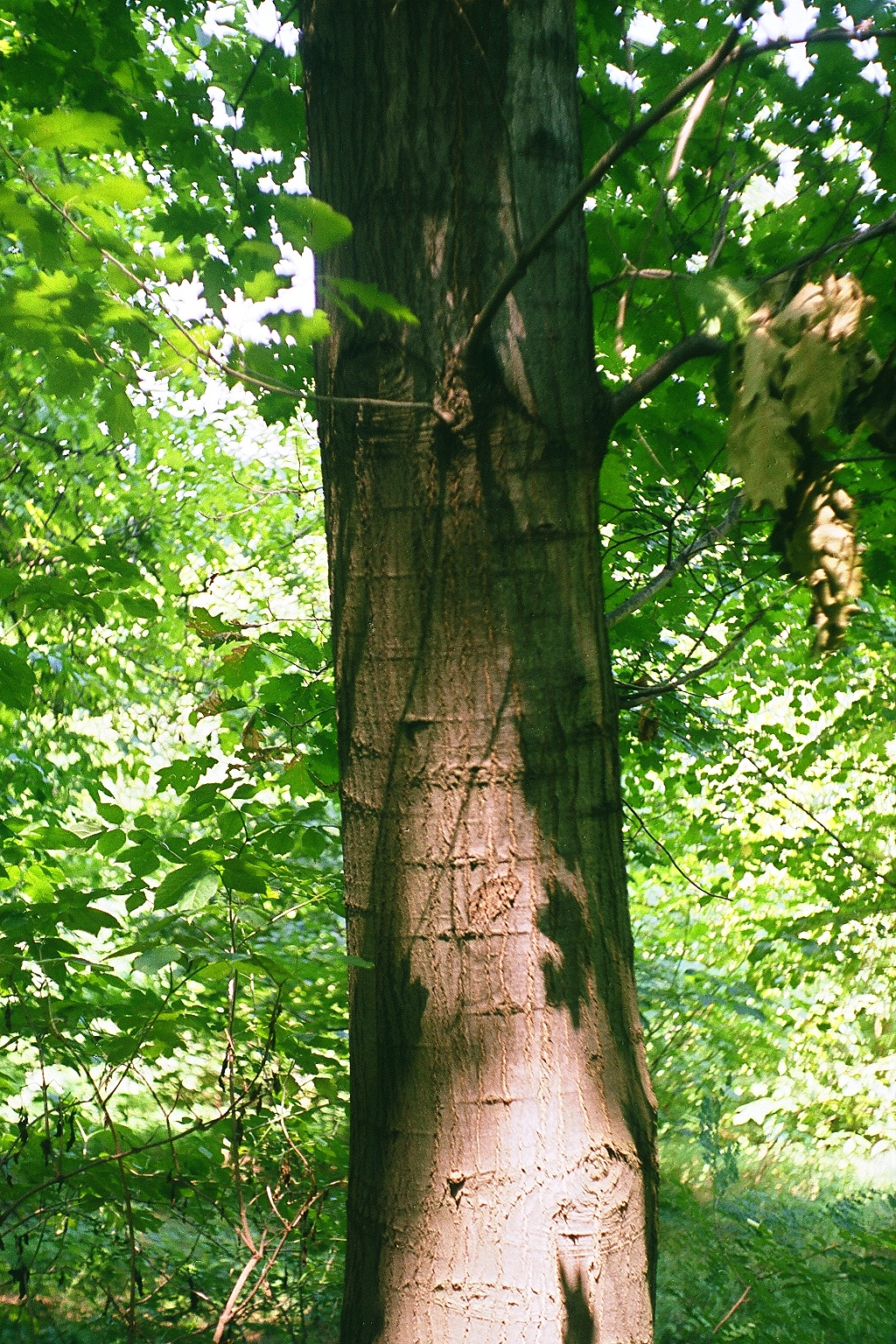
Young red oak bark

== See also ==
- Barkdust
