= Kinotannic acid =

Names
- Other names Coccotannic acid kino-tannic acid

Identifiers

Properties
Chemical formula	C_{18}H_{18}O_{8}
- Except where otherwise noted, data are given for materials in their standard state (at 25 °C [77 °F], 100 kPa). verify (what is ?) Infobox references

Kinotannic acid is the chief constituent of the kino gum, of which it contains 70 to 80 per cent. Kino also contains kino red, a phlobaphene produced from kinotannic acid by oxidation. It is closely related to the tannin from catechu; its non-glucosidal nature was established by Bergholz.

== Properties ==
When dry distilled it yields pyrocatechine and protocatechinic acid.

It is soluble in water. Solutions are precipitated by lead or copper salts.

Kinotannic acid is degraded by oxidation when exposed to air.
