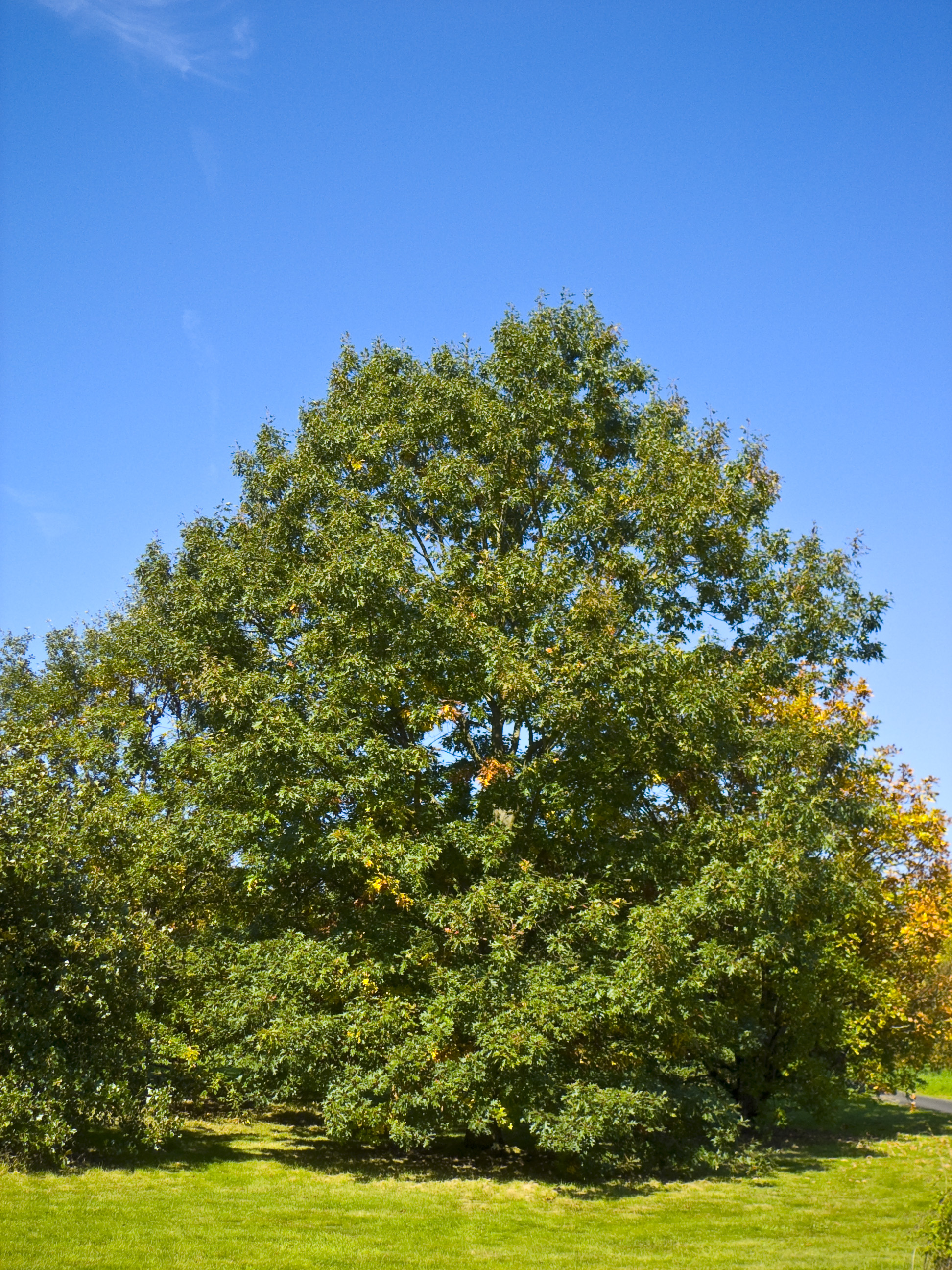
- Planted tree

Conservation status
- Least Concern (IUCN 3.1)

Scientific classification
- Kingdom: Plantae
- Clade: Embryophytes
- Clade: Tracheophytes
- Clade: Angiosperms
- Clade: Eudicots
- Clade: Rosids
- Order: Fagales
- Family: Fagaceae
- Genus: Quercus
- Subgenus: Quercus subg. Quercus
- Section: Quercus sect. Lobatae
- Species: Q. velutina

Binomial name
- Quercus velutina Lam.
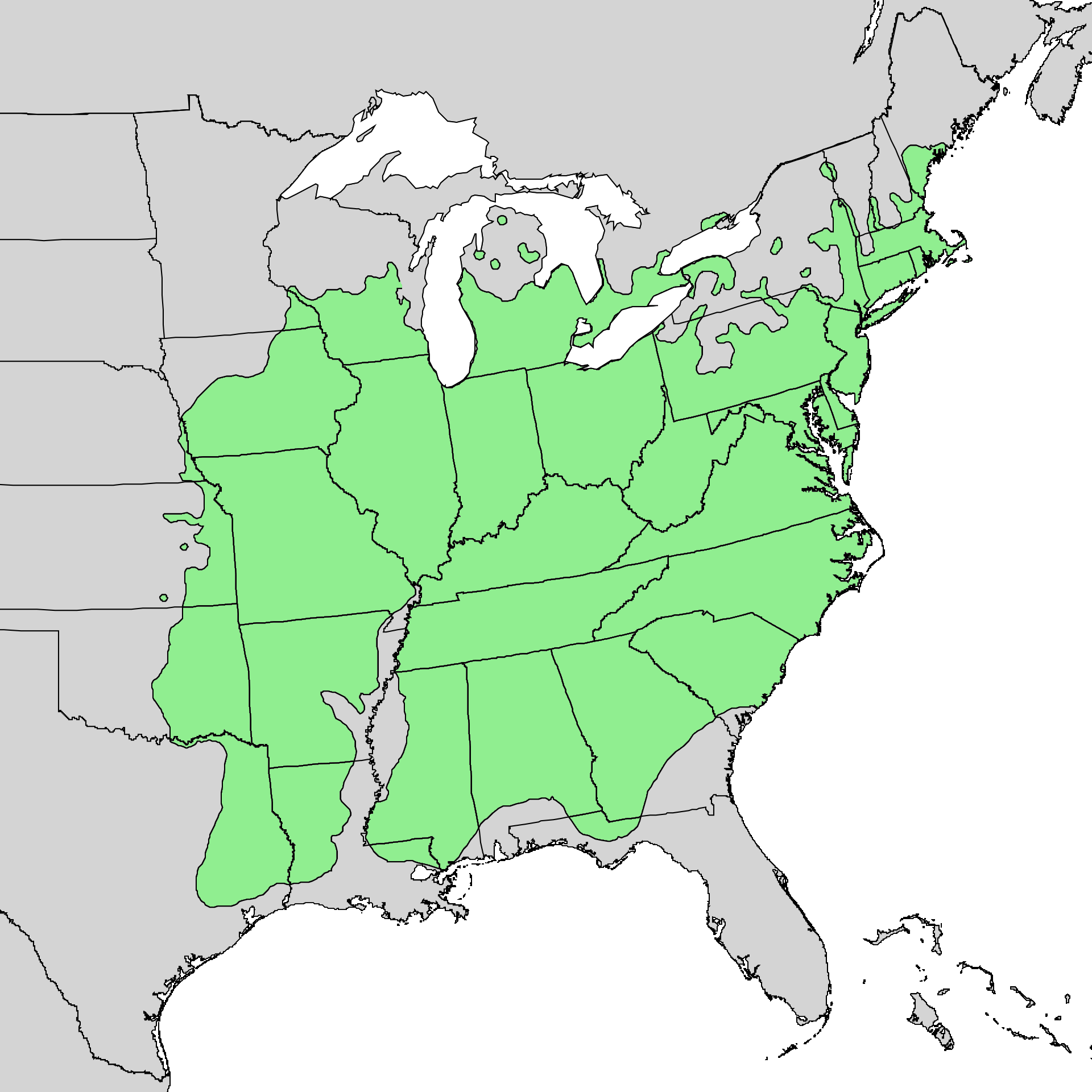
- Generalized natural range

Synonyms
- List: Quercus discolor Aiton; Quercus leiodermis Ashe; Quercus missouriensis Ashe; Quercus tinctoria Bartram; Quercus tinctoria Michx.

= Quercus velutina =

Black oak

Species of oak tree

Quercus velutina (Latin 'velutina', "velvety") , the black oak, is a species of oak in the red oak group (Quercus sect. Lobatae), native and widespread in eastern and central North America. It is sometimes called the eastern black oak.

Quercus velutina was previously known as yellow oak due to the yellow pigment in its inner bark.

== Description ==
In the northern part of its range, Quercus velutina is a relatively small tree, reaching a height of 20–25 metres (66–82 feet) and a diameter of 90 centimetres (35 inches), but it grows larger in the south and center of its range, where heights of up to 42 m (138 ft) are known.

The leaves of the black oak are alternately arranged on the twig and are 10–20 cm (4–8 in) long with 5–7 bristle-tipped lobes separated by deep U-shaped notches. The upper surface of the leaf is a shiny deep green, and the lower is yellowish-brown. There are also stellate hairs on the underside of the leaf that grow in clumps. Some key characteristics for identification include that leaves grown in the sun have very deep U-shaped sinuses and that the buds are velvety and covered in white hairs.

Black oak is monoecious. The staminate flowers develop from leaf axils of the previous year and the catkins emerge before or at the same time as the current leaves in April or May. The pistillate flowers are borne in the axils of the current year's leaves and may be solitary or occur in two- to many-flowered spikes. The fruit, an acorn that occurs singly or in clusters of two to five, is about one-third enclosed in a scaly cup and matures in 2 years. Black oak acorns are brown when mature and ripen from late August to late October, depending on geographic location.

The fruits or acorns of the black oak are medium-sized and broadly rounded. The cap is large and covers almost half of the nut.

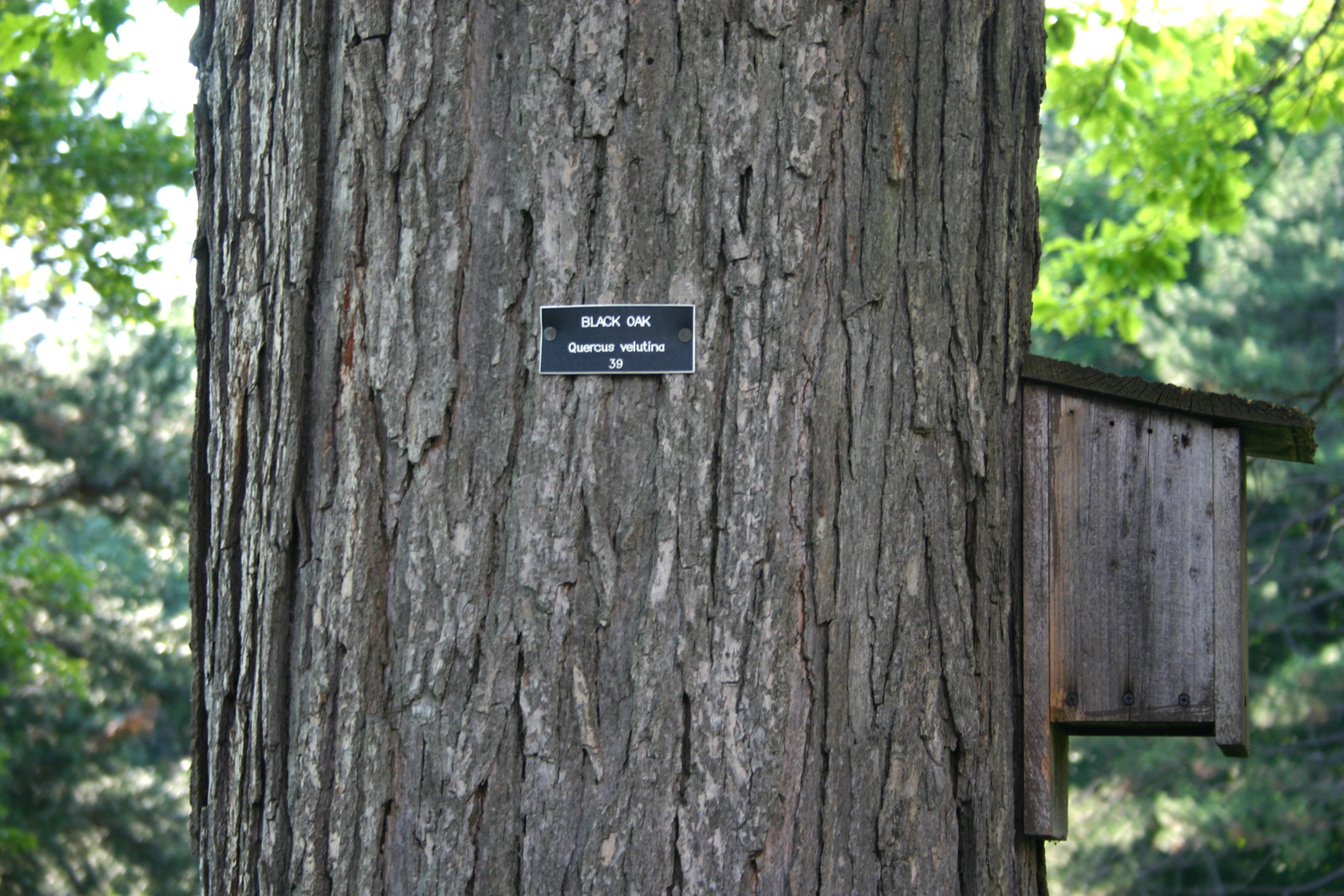
Detail of mature bark

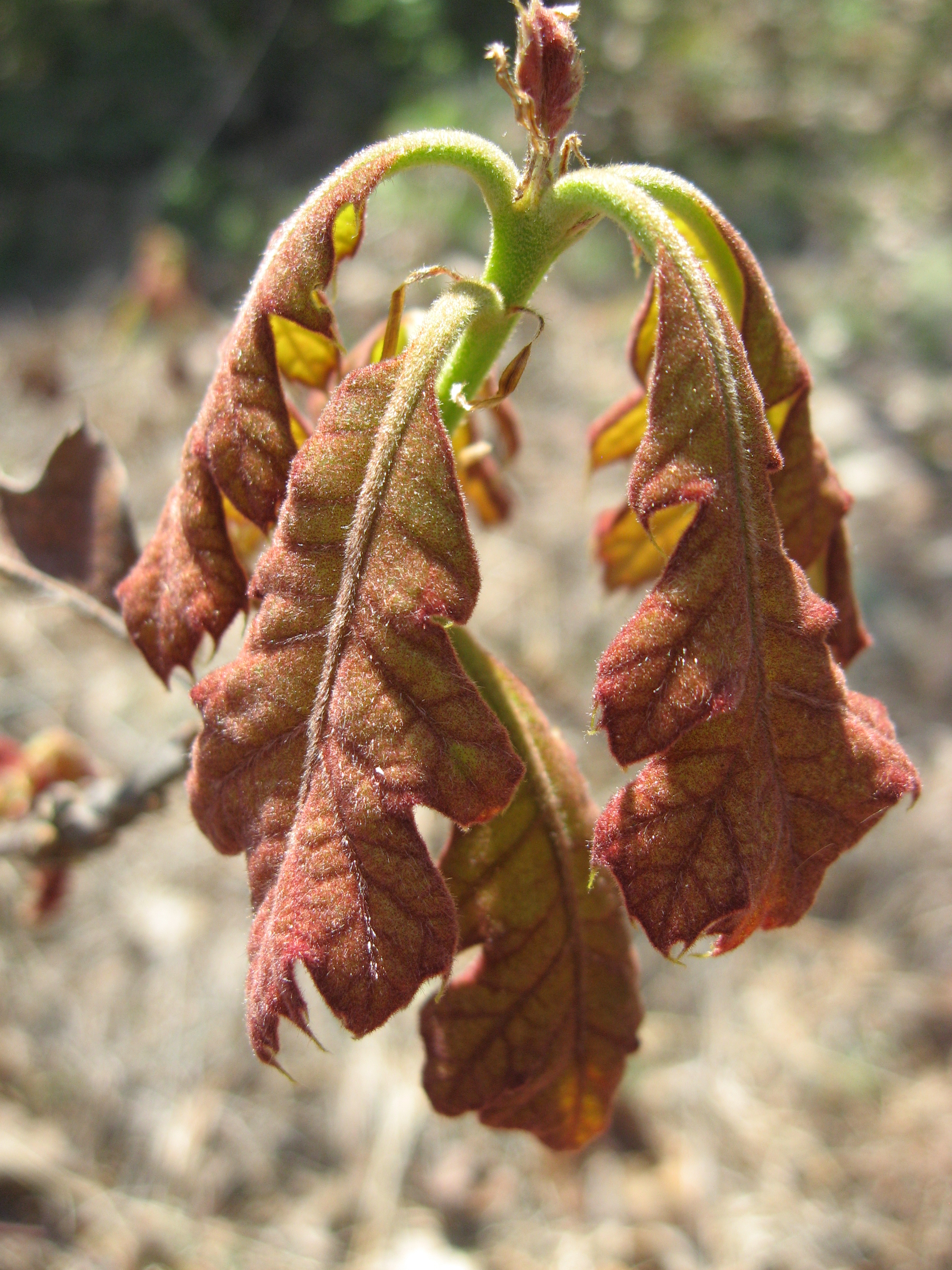
Young leaves are densely pubescent (hairy)

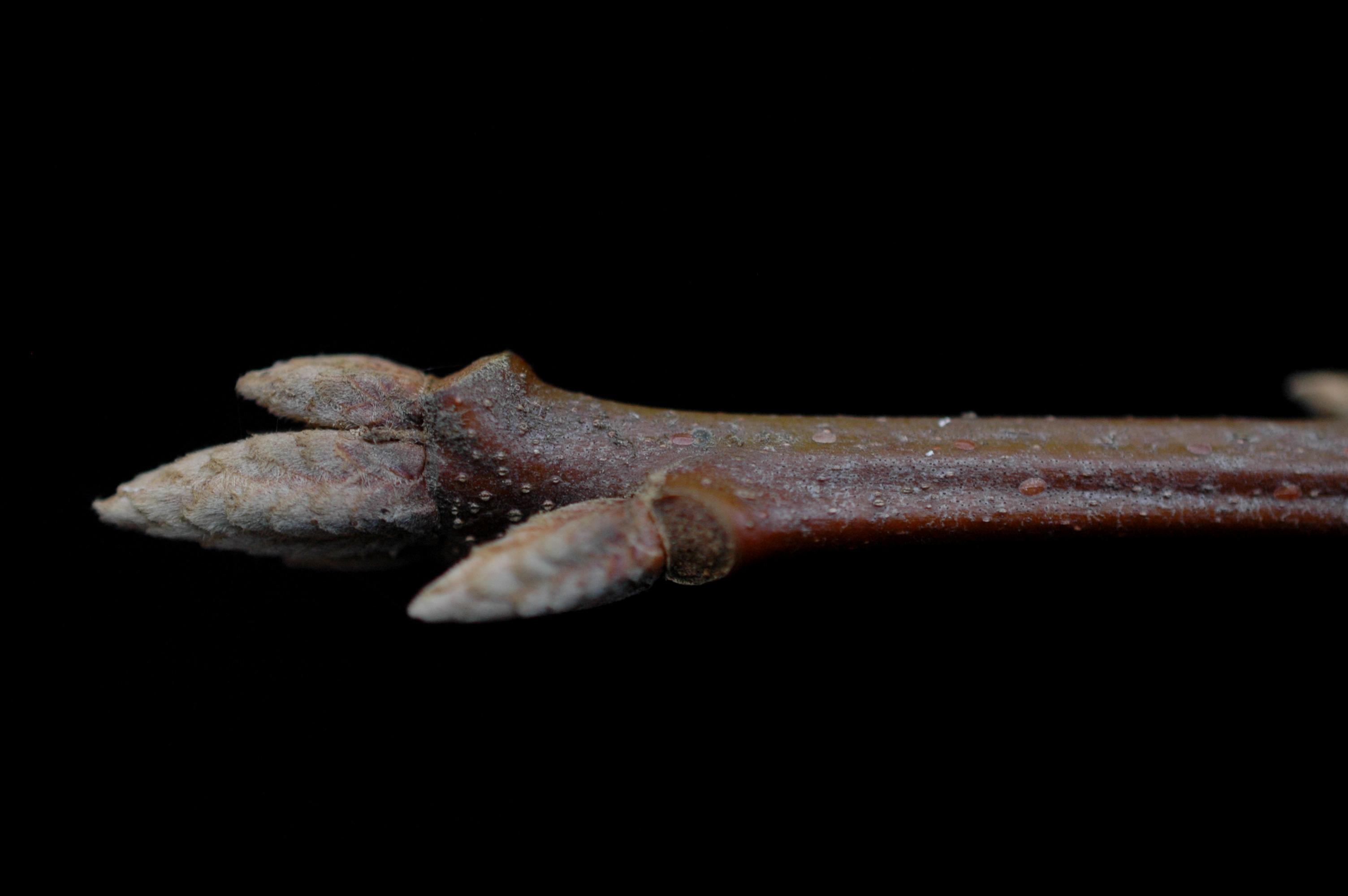
Winter twig

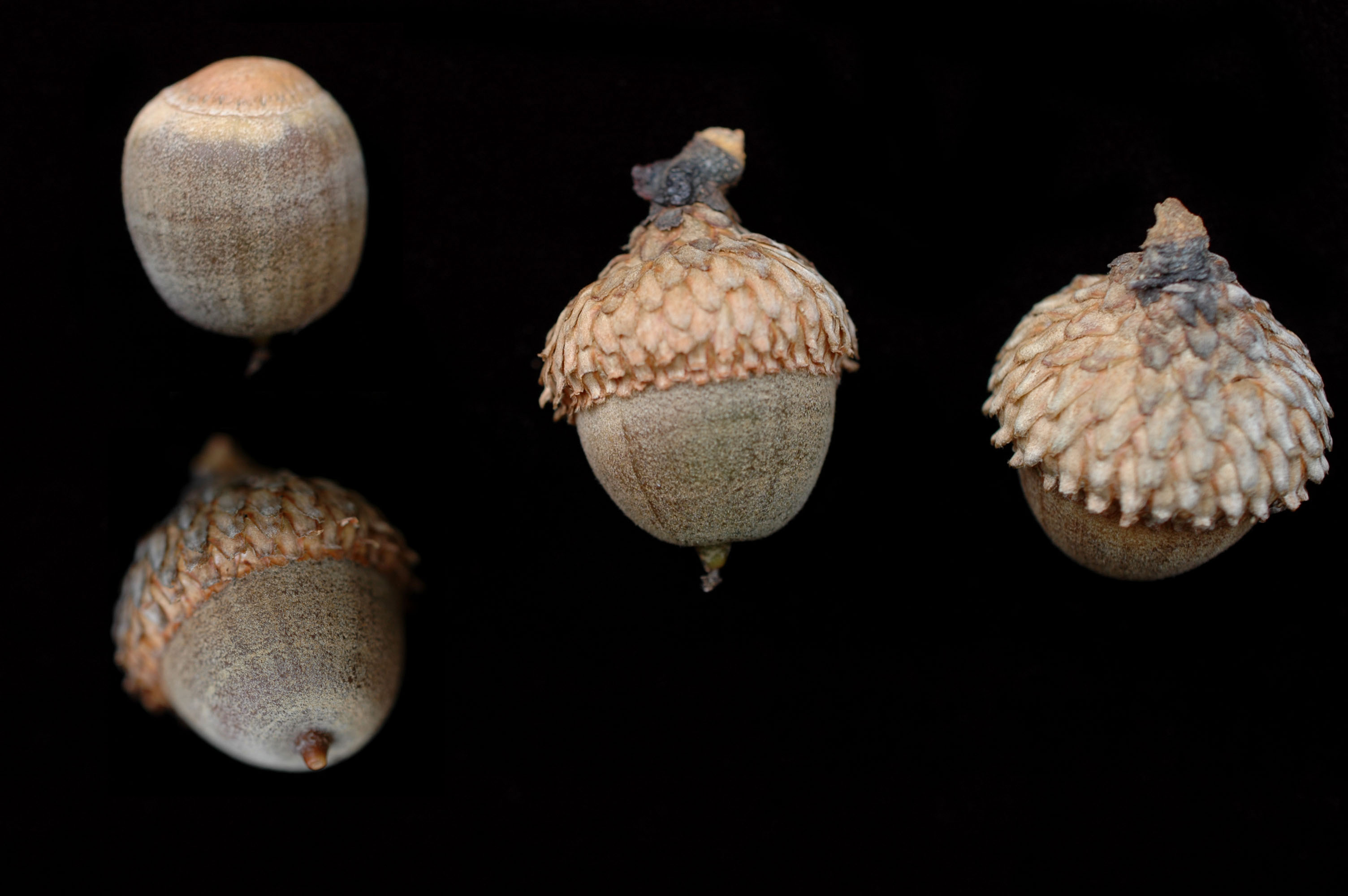
Acorns

== Habitat and distribution ==
Black oak is found in all the coastal states from Maine to Texas, inland as far as Michigan, Ontario, Minnesota, Nebraska, Kansas, Oklahoma, and eastern Texas.

It grows on all aspects and slope positions. It grows best in coves and on middle and lower slopes with northerly and easterly aspects. It is found at elevations up to 1,200 m (3,900 ft) in the southern Appalachians. In southern New England, black oak grows on cool, moist soils. Elsewhere it occurs on warm, moist soils. The most widespread soils on which black oak grows are the udalfs and udolls. These soils are derived from glacial materials, sandstones, shales, and limestone and range from heavy clays to loamy sands with some having a high content of rock or chert fragments. Black oak grows best on well drained, silty clay to loam soils.

The most important factors determining site quality for black oak are the thickness and texture of the A horizon, texture of the B horizon, aspect, and slope position. Other factors may be important in localized areas. For example, in northwestern West Virginia increasing precipitation to 1,120 millimetres (44 in) resulted in increased site quality; more than 1,120 mm (44 in) had no further effect. In southern Indiana, decreasing site quality was associated with increasing slope steepness.

Near the limits of its range, topographic factors may restrict its distribution. At the western limits black oak is often found only on north and east aspects where moisture conditions are most favorable. In southern Minnesota and Wisconsin it is usually found only on ridge tops and the lower two-thirds of south- and west-facing slopes.

Black oaks are a characteristic species of some types of oak savannas in the United States and Canada due to their fire tolerance.

== Ecology ==
=== Associated plant species ===
Common tree associates of black oak are white oak (Quercus alba), northern red oak (Quercus rubra), pignut hickory (Carya glabra), mockernut hickory (C. tomentosa), bitternut hickory (C. cordiformis), and shagbark hickory (C. ovata); American elm (Ulmus americana) and slippery elm (U. rubra); white ash (Fraxinus americana); black walnut (Juglans nigra) and butternut (J. cinerea); scarlet oak (Quercus coccinea), southern red oak (Q. falcata), and chinkapin oak (Q. muehlenbergii); red maple (Acer rubrum) and sugar maple (A. saccharum); black cherry (Prunus serotina); and blackgum (Nyssa sylvatica).

Common small tree associates of black oak include flowering dogwood (Cornus florida), sourwood (Oxydendrum arboreum), sassafras (Sassafras albidum), eastern hophornbeam (Ostrya virginiana), redbud (Cercis canadensis), pawpaw (Asimina triloba), downy serviceberry (Amelanchier arborea), and American bladdernut (Staphylea trifolia). Common shrubs include Vaccinium spp., mountain-laurel (Kalmia latifolia), witch-hazel (Hamamelis virginiana), beaked hazel (Corylus cornuta), spicebush (Lindera benzoin), sumac (Rhus spp.), and Viburnum spp. The most common vines are greenbrier (Smilax spp.), grape (Vitis spp.), poison-ivy (Toxicodendron radicans), and Virginia creeper (Parthenocissus quinquefolia).

Black oak is often a predominant species in the canopy of an oak–heath forest.

=== Seed production and dissemination ===
In forest stands, black oak begins to produce seeds at about age 20 and reaches optimum production at 40 to 75 years. It is a consistent seed producer with good crops of acorns every 2 to 3 years. In Missouri, the average number of mature acorns per tree was generally higher than for other oaks over a 5-year period, but the number of acorns differed greatly from year to year and from tree to tree within the same stand.

The number of seeds that become available for regenerating black oak may be low even in good seed years. Insects, squirrels, deer, turkey, small rodents, and birds consume many acorns. They can eat or damage a high percentage of the acorn crop in most years and essentially all of it in poor seed years.

Black oak acorns from a single tree are dispersed over a limited area by squirrels, mice, and gravity. The blue jay may disperse over longer distances.

=== Response to competition ===
Black oak is classed as intermediate in tolerance to shade. It is less tolerant than many of its associates such as white and chestnut oaks, hickories, beech (Fagus grandifolia), maples, elm, and blackgum. However, it is more tolerant than yellow-poplar (Liriodendron tulipifera), black cherry, and shortleaf pine (Pinus echinata). It is about the same as northern red oak and scarlet oak. Seedlings usually die within a few years after being established under fully stocked over stories. Most black oak sprouts under mature stands develop crooked stems and flat-topped or misshapen crowns. After the over story is removed, only the large stems are capable of competing successfully. Seedlings are soon overtopped. The few that survive usually remain in the intermediate crown class.

Even-aged silvicultural systems satisfy the reproduction and growth requirements of black oak better than the all-aged or uneven-aged selection system. Under the selection system, black oak is unable to reproduce because of inadequate light. Stands containing black oak that are managed under the selection system will gradually be dominated by more shade-tolerant species.

Dormant buds are numerous on the boles of black oak trees. These buds may be stimulated to sprout and produce branches by mechanical pruning or by exposure to greatly increased light, as by thinning heavily or creating openings in the stand. Dominant trees are less likely to produce epicormic branches than those in the lower crown class.

=== Damaging agents ===
Wildfires seriously damage black oak trees by killing the cambium at the base of the trees. This creates an entry point for decay fungi. The result is loss of volume because of heart rot. Trees up to pole size are easily killed by fire and severe fires may even kill saw timber. Many of the killed trees sprout and form a new stand. However, the economic loss may be large unless at least some of it can be salvaged.

Oak wilt (Bretziella fagacearum) is a potentially serious vascular disease of black oak that is widespread throughout the eastern United States. Trees die within a few weeks after the symptoms first appear. Usually scattered individuals or small groups of trees are killed, but areas several hectares in size may be affected. The disease is spread from tree to tree through root grafts and over larger distances by sap-feeding beetles (Nitidulidae) and the small oak bark beetle.

Shoestring root rot (Armillaria mellea) attacks black oak and may kill trees weakened by fire, lightning, drought, insects, or other diseases. A root rot, Phytophthora cinnamomi, may kill seedlings in the nursery. Cankers caused by Strumella and Nectria species damage the holes of black oak but seldom kill trees. Foliage diseases that attack black oak are the same as those that typically attack species in the red oak group and include anthracnose (Gnomonia quercina), leaf blister (Taphrina spp.), powdery mildews (Phyllactinia corylea and Microsphaera alni), oak-pine rusts (Cronartium spp.), and leaf spots (Actinopelte dryina).

Tunneling insects that attack the boles of black oak and cause serious lumber degrade include the carpenter worm (Prionoxystus robiniae), red oak borer (Enaphalodes rufulus), the twolined chestnut borer (Agrilus bilineatus), the oak timber worm (Arrenodes minutus), and the Columbian timber beetle (Corthylus columbianus).

The gypsy moth (Lymantria dispar) feeds on foliage and is potentially the most destructive insect. Although black oaks withstood a single defoliation, two or three defoliations in successive years kill many trees. Other defoliators that attack black oak and may occasionally be epidemic are the variable oak leaf caterpillar (Heterocampa manteo), the orange striped oakworm (Anisota senatoria), and the brown tail moth (Euproctis chrysorrhoea).

The nut weevils (Curculio spp.), gall-forming cynipids (Callirhytis spp.), filbertworm (Melissopus latiferreanus), and acorn moth (Valentinia glandulella) damage black oak acorns.

== Named hybrids involving black oak ==
Black oak is well known to readily hybridize with other members of the red oak (Quercus sect. Lobatae) group, being one parent in at least a dozen different named hybrids.

- Quercus × bushii (Quercus marilandica × Q. velutina) – Bush's oak
- Quercus × cocksii (Quercus laurifolia × Q. velutina) – Cocks' oak
- Quercus × demarei (Quercus nigra × Q. velutina)
- Quercus × discreta (Quercus shumardii × Q. velutina)
- Quercus × filialis (Quercus phellos × Q. velutina)
- Quercus × fontana (Quercus coccinea × Q. velutina)
- Quercus × hawkinsiae (Quercus rubra × Q. velutina) – Hawkin's oak
- Quercus × leana (Quercus imbricaria × Q. velutina) – Lea's oak
- Quercus × palaeolithicola (Quercus ellipsoidalis × Q. velutina)
- Quercus × podophylla (Quercus incana × Q. velutina)
- Quercus × rehderi (Quercus ilicifolia × Q. velutina) – Rehder's oak
- Quercus × vaga (Quercus palustris × Q. velutina)
- Quercus × willdenowiana (Quercus falcata × Q. velutina) – Willdenow's oak

== Uses ==
The inner bark of the black oak contains a yellow-orange coloring from the pigment quercitron, which was historically exported to Europe and used as a textile dye. The species is also known as yellow oak.
