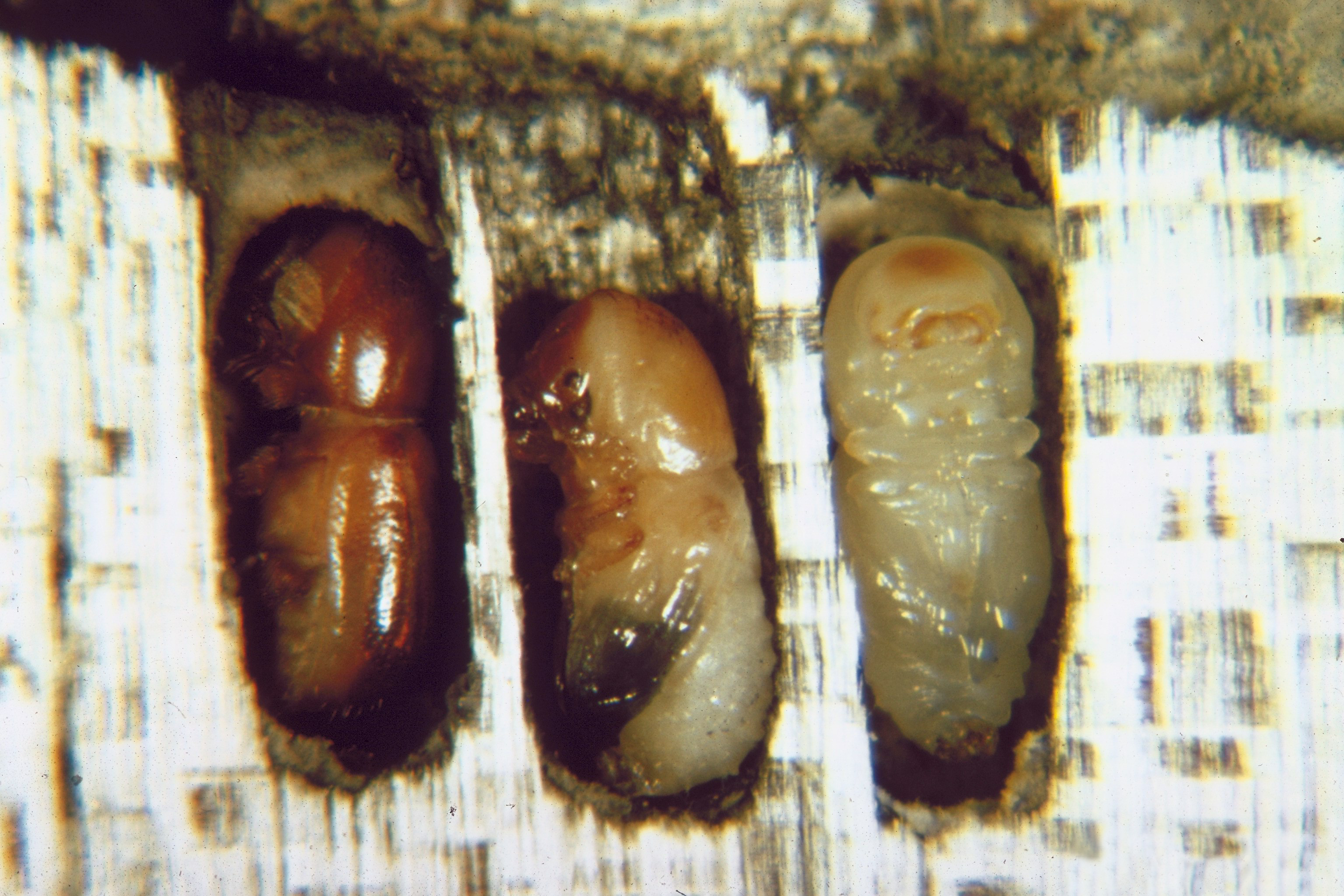
- Adult, at left, with two pupae in brood cells

Scientific classification
- Kingdom: Animalia
- Phylum: Arthropoda
- Clade: Pancrustacea
- Class: Insecta
- Order: Coleoptera
- Suborder: Polyphaga
- Infraorder: Cucujiformia
- Family: Curculionidae
- Genus: Corthylus
- Species: C. columbianus

Binomial name
- Corthylus columbianus Hopkins, 1894

= Corthylus columbianus =

Species of beetle

Corthylus columbianus, also known as the chestnut timber worm or the Columbian timber beetle, is a beetle of the family Curculionidae.
