= Quercitrin =

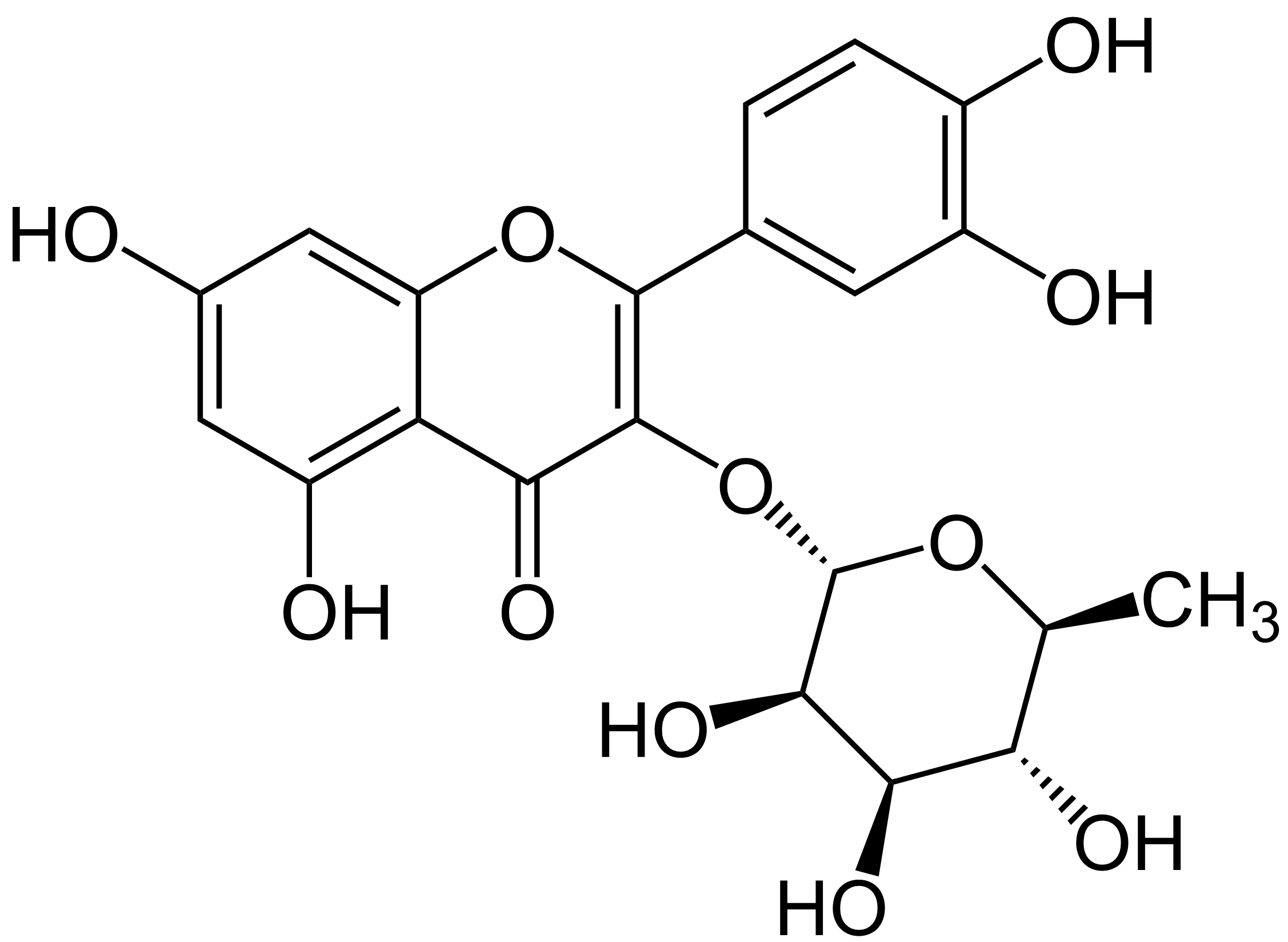

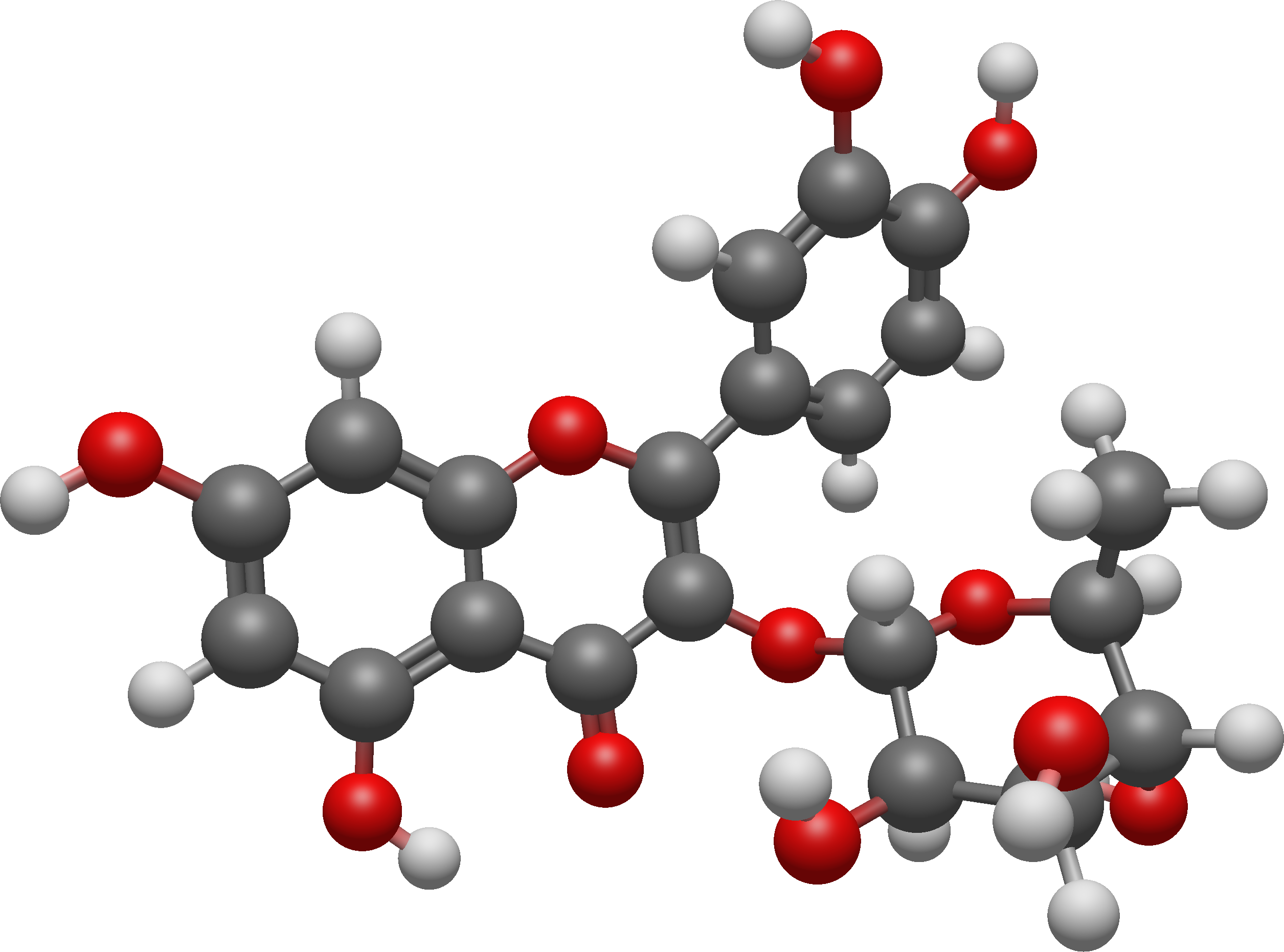

Names
- IUPAC name 3′,4′,5,7-Tetrahydroxy-3-(α-L-rhamnopyranosyloxy)flavone
- Systematic IUPAC name 2-(3,4-Dihydroxyphenyl)-5,7-dihydroxy-3-{[(2S,3R,4R,5R,6S)-3,4,5-trihydroxy-6-methyloxan-2-yl]oxy}-4H-1-benzopyran-4-one
- Other names Quercetin 3-O-a-L-rhamnoside; Thujin; Quercetin 3-rhamnoside Quercetin-3-rhamnoside; Quercetin-3-L-rhamnoside

Identifiers
CAS Number	522-12-3
3D model (JSmol)	Interactive image
ChEBI	CHEBI:17558
ChEMBL	ChEMBL82242
ChemSpider	4444112
ECHA InfoCard	100.007.567
KEGG	C01750
PubChem CID	5280459
UNII	2Y8906LC5P
CompTox Dashboard (EPA)	DTXSID50200230
- InChI: InChI=1S/C21H20O11/c1-7-15(26)17(28)18(29)21(30-7)32-20-16(27)14-12(25)5-9(22)6-13(14)31-19(20)8-2-3-10(23)11(24)4-8/h2-7,15,17-18,21-26,28-29H,1H3/t7-,15-,17+,18+,21-/m0/s1 Key: OXGUCUVFOIWWQJ-HQBVPOQASA-N; InChI=1/C21H20O11/c1-7-15(26)17(28)18(29)21(30-7)32-20-16(27)14-12(25)5-9(22)6-13(14)31-19(20)8-2-3-10(23)11(24)4-8/h2-7,15,17-18,21-26,28-29H,1H3/t7-,15-,17+,18+,21-/m0/s1 Key: OXGUCUVFOIWWQJ-HQBVPOQABA
- SMILES: C[C@H]1[C@@H]([C@H]([C@H]([C@@H](O1)OC2=C(OC3=CC(=CC(=C3C2=O)O)O)C4=CC(=C(C=C4)O)O)O)O)O

Properties
Chemical formula	C_{21}H_{20}O_{11}
Molar mass	448.38 g/mol
- Except where otherwise noted, data are given for materials in their standard state (at 25 °C [77 °F], 100 kPa). verify (what is ?) Infobox references

Quercitrin is a glycoside formed from the flavonoid quercetin and the deoxy sugar rhamnose.

Austrian chemist Heinrich Hlasiwetz (1825-1875) is remembered for his chemical analysis of quercitrin.

It has also been investigated as a potential dietary supplement.

== Occurrence ==
Quercitrin is a constituent of the dye quercitron. It can be found in Tartary buckwheat (Fagopyrum tataricum) and in oaks species like the North American white oak (Quercus alba) and English oak (Quercus robur). It is also found in Nymphaea odorata or Taxillus kaempferi.

== Metabolism ==
The enzyme quercitrinase catalyzes the chemical reaction between quercitrin and H_{2}O to yield L-rhamnose and quercetin.
