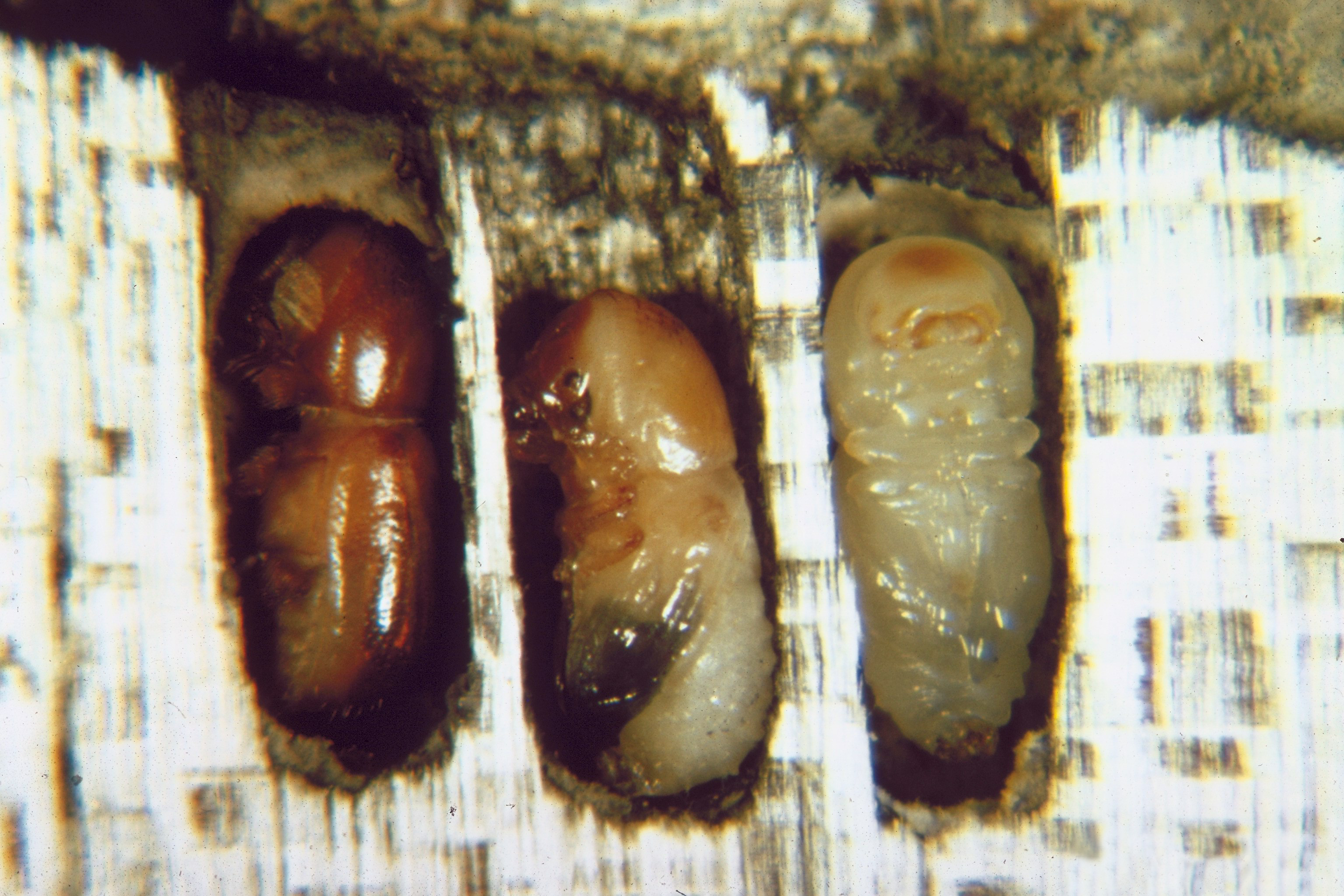
- Corthylus columbianus

Scientific classification
- Kingdom: Animalia
- Phylum: Arthropoda
- Class: Insecta
- Order: Coleoptera
- Suborder: Polyphaga
- Infraorder: Cucujiformia
- Family: Curculionidae
- Subfamily: Scolytinae
- Tribe: Scolytini
- Subtribe: Corthylina
- Genus: Corthylus; Erichson, 1836

Diversity
- at least 190 species

= Corthylus =

Genus of beetles

Corthylus is a genus of typical bark beetles in the family Curculionidae. There are more than 190 described species in Corthylus.

== See also ==
- List of Corthylus species
