= Quercitron =

Natural dye from the bark of the species Quercus velutina

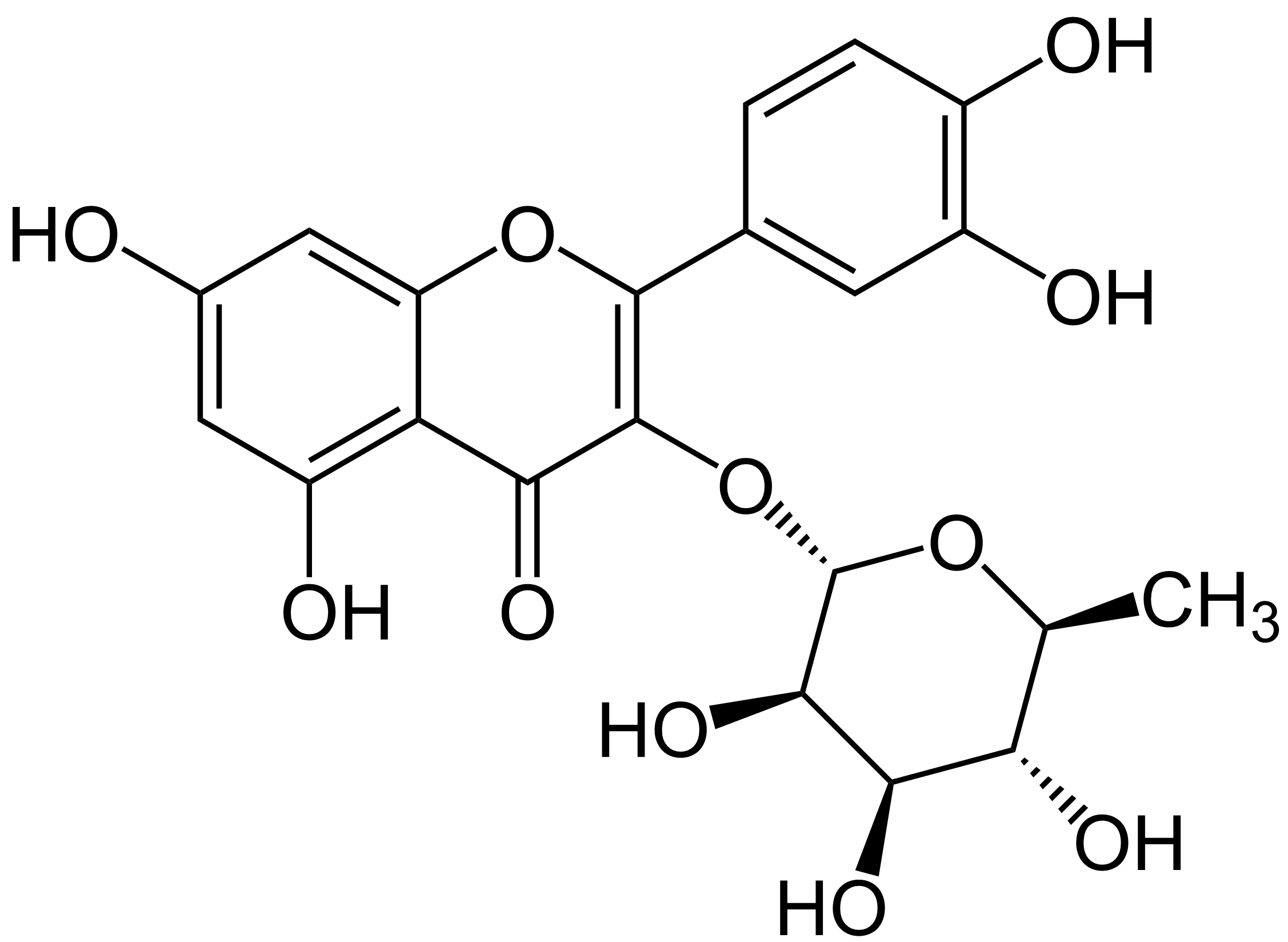
Chemical structure of quercitrin, the active dyeing principle of quercitron

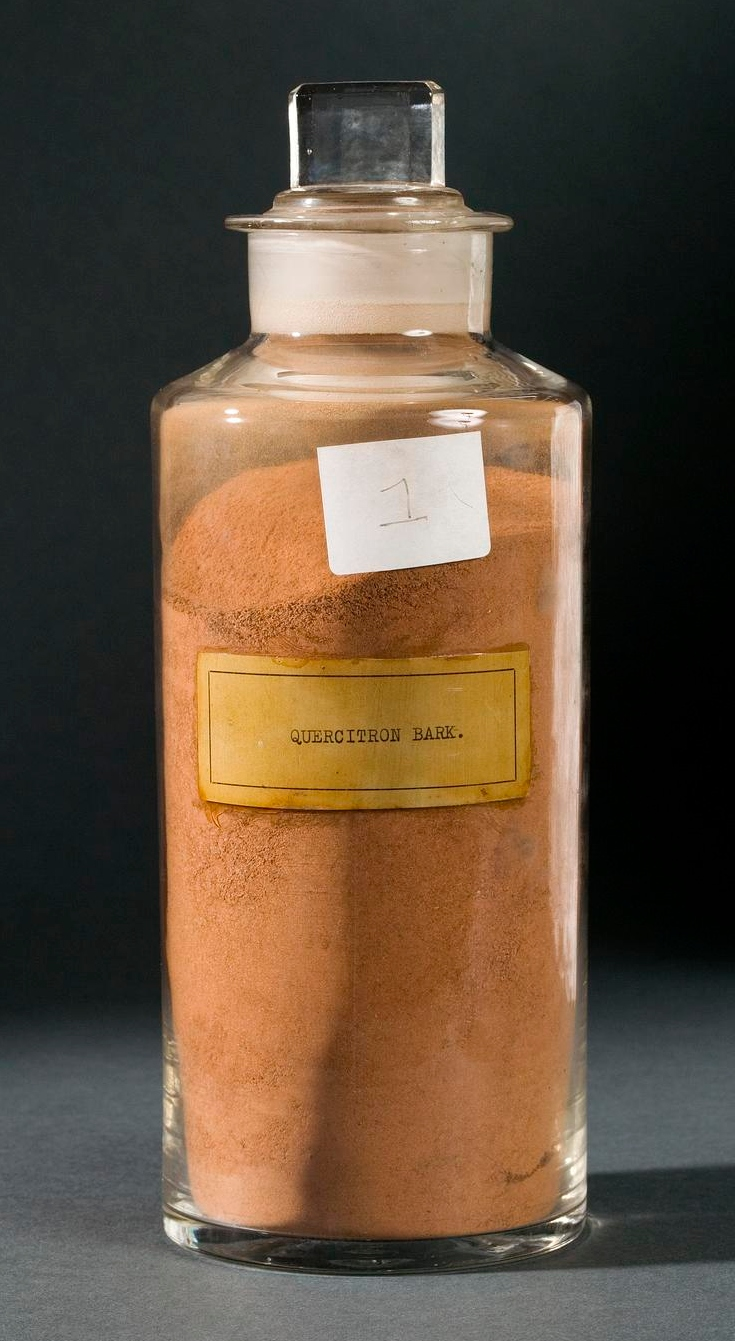
Powdered quercitron

Quercitron is a yellow natural dye obtained from the bark of the Eastern Black Oak (Quercus velutina), a forest tree indigenous in North America. It was formerly called Dutch pink, English pink, or Italian pink.

The name is a shortened form of quercicitron, from Latin quercus, oak, and citron, lemon, and was invented by Edward Bancroft (1744–1821), who by act of Parliament (25 Geo. 3. c. 38) in 1785 was granted special privileges in regard to the importation and use of the substance. The dyestuff is prepared by grinding the bark in mills after it has been freed from its black epidermal layer, and sifting the product to separate the fibrous matter, the fine yellow powder which remains forming the quercitron of commerce.

The ruddy-orange decoction of quercitron contains quercitannic acid, whence its use in tanning, and an active dyeing principle, quercitrin, C_{21}H_{20}O_{11}. The latter substance is a glycoside, and in aqueous solution under the influence of mineral acids it yields quercetin, C_{15}H_{10}O_{7}, which is precipitated, and the methyl-pentose rhamnose.

Quercetin is a crystalline powder of a brilliant citron yellow color, entirely insoluble in cold water and dissolving only sparingly in hot water, but quite soluble in alcohol. Either by itself or in some form of its glucoside quercitrin, quercetin is found in several vegetable substances, among others in cutch, in Persian berries (Rhamnus cathartica), buckwheat leaves (Fagopyrum esculentum), Zante fustic wood (Rhus cotinus), and in rose petals.

Chemically, quercetin is a member of a fairly extensive class of natural coloring matters derived from phenyl benzoyl-pyrone or flavone, the constitution of which followed on the researches of Stanisław Kostanecki, A. G. Perkin, Herzig, Goldschmidt and others. Among the related, coloring matters are: chrysin from poplar buds, apigenin from parsley, luteolin from weld, mignonette and dyer's broom, fisetin from young fustic and yellow cypress, galangin from galangal root, and myricetin from Nageia nagi.

In Iowa in the late 1840s and early 1850s, according to the historian Philip Dillon Jordan:

Weld, fustic, and quercitron bark were carried as staple items in drug stores and general merchandise establishments. Sometimes, the physician kept a small supply of dye stuffs. It was not too uncommon, indeed, to find a jar of indigo next to a laudanum bottle and a box of quercitron associating with unrefined quinine.
