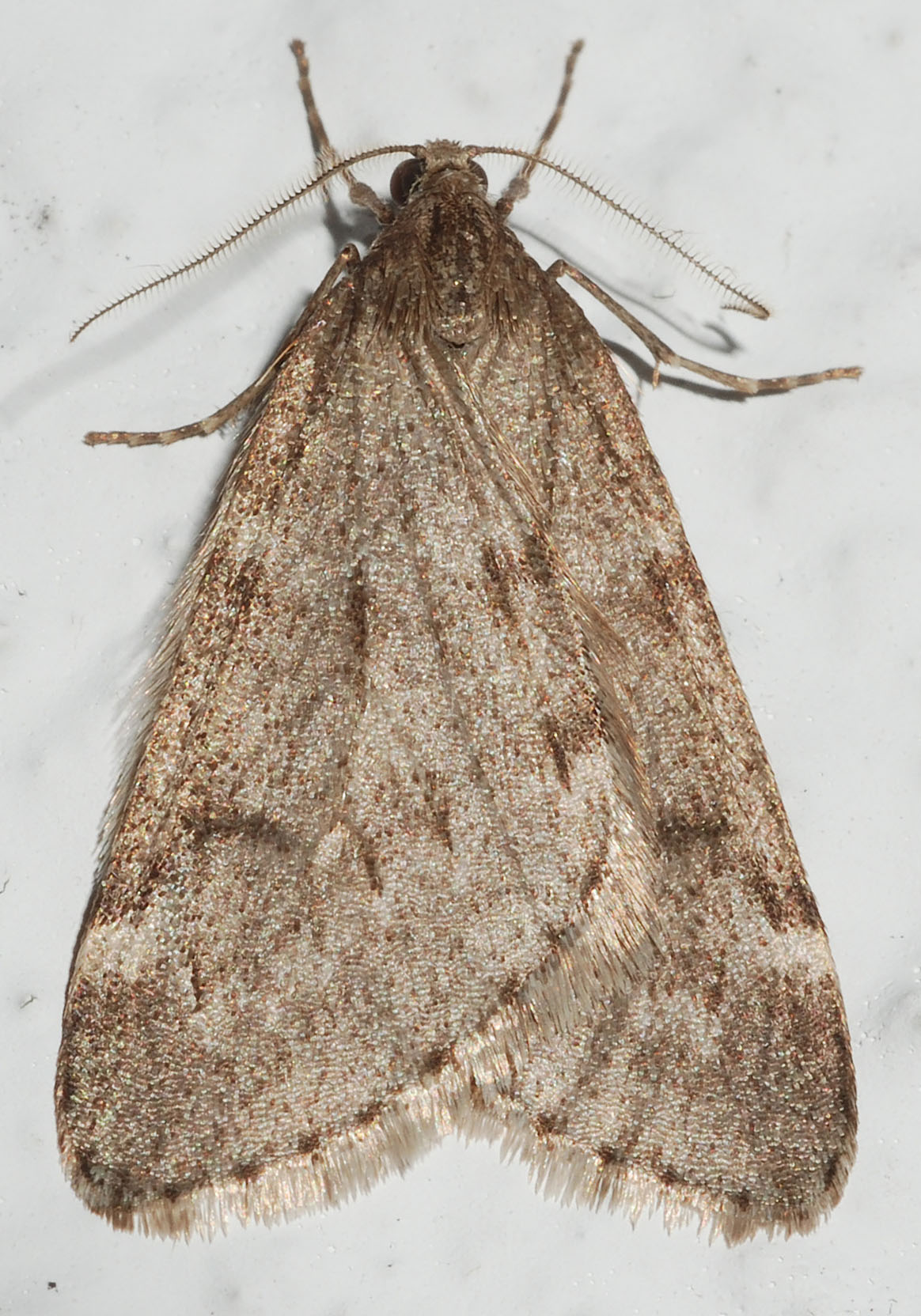
- Alsophila pometaria

Scientific classification
- Kingdom: Animalia
- Phylum: Arthropoda
- Class: Insecta
- Order: Lepidoptera
- Family: Geometridae
- Subfamily: Alsophilinae; Herbulot, 1962

Genera
- Alsophila; Inurois

= Alsophilinae =

Subfamily of moths

Alsophilinae is a subfamily of the moth family Geometridae, consisting of two genera, Alsophila and Inurois.

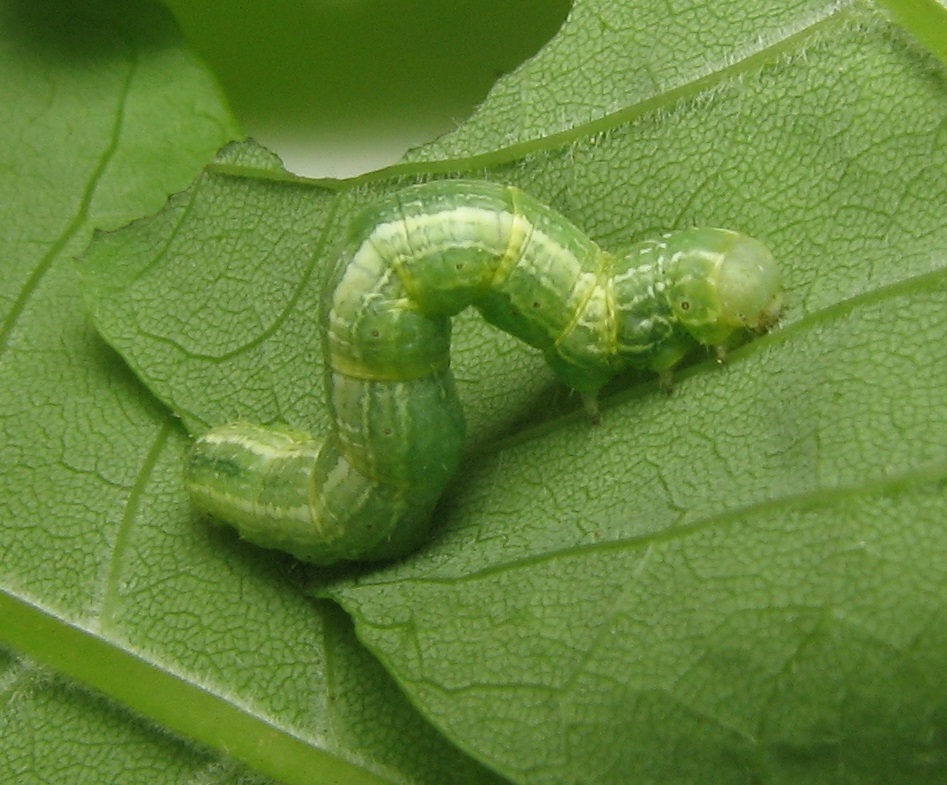
Alsophila pometaria, caterpillar

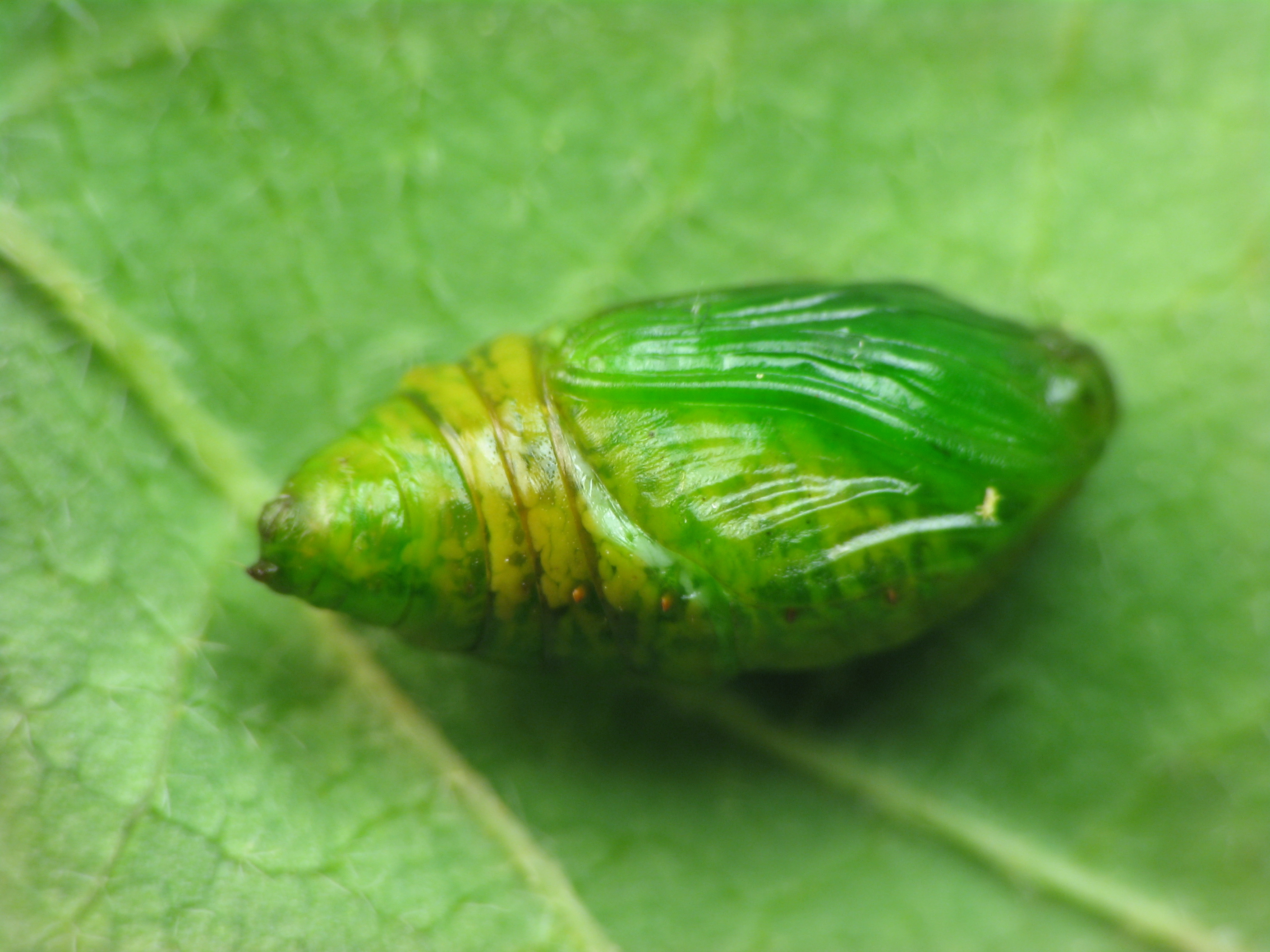
Alsophila pometaria, pupa
