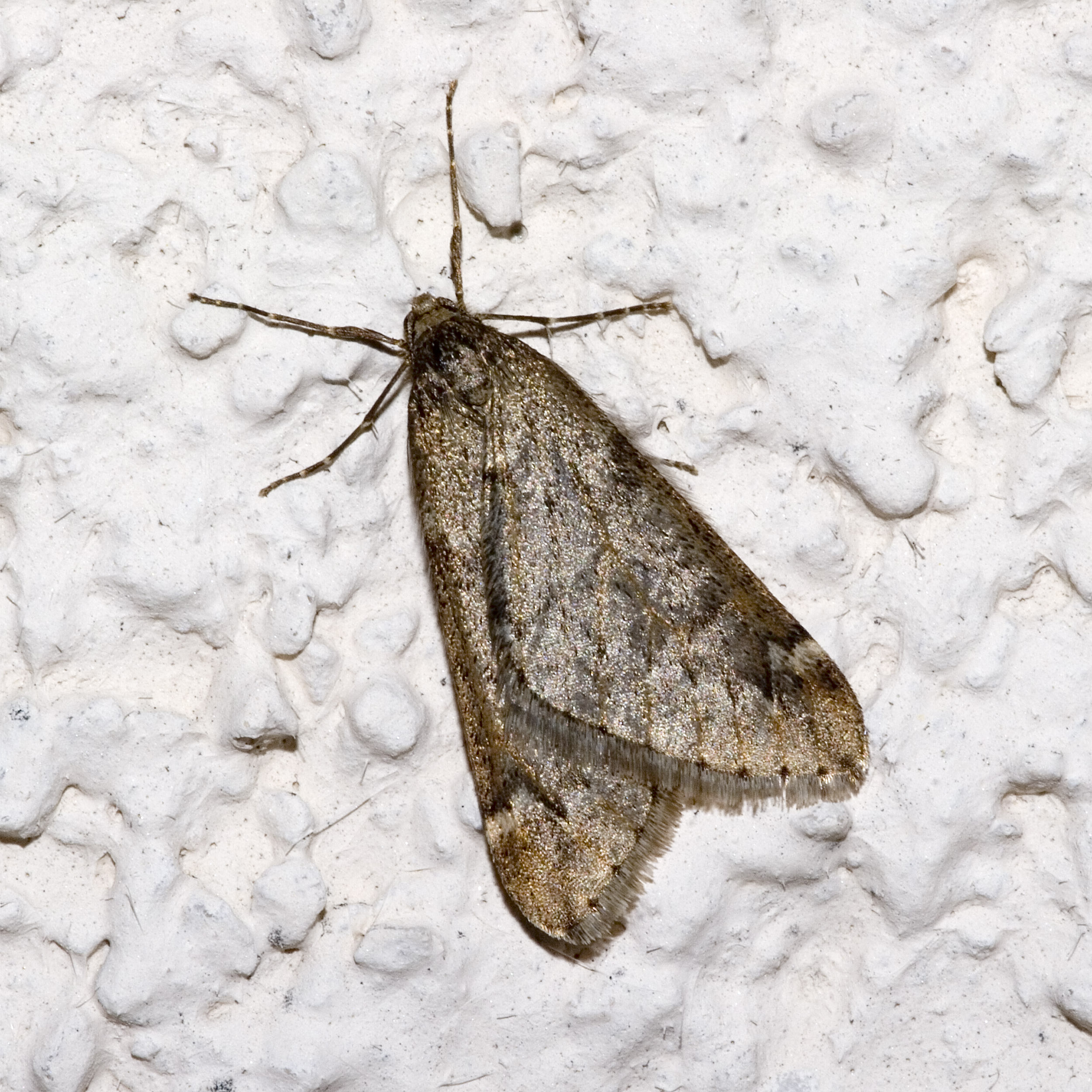

Scientific classification
- Kingdom: Animalia
- Phylum: Arthropoda
- Clade: Pancrustacea
- Class: Insecta
- Order: Lepidoptera
- Family: Geometridae
- Genus: Alsophila
- Species: A. aescularia

Binomial name
- Alsophila aescularia (Denis & Schiffermüller, 1775)

= Alsophila aescularia =

Species of moth

Alsophila aescularia, the March moth, is a species of moth of the family Geometridae. It is found throughout Europe and can be a pest of fruit trees.

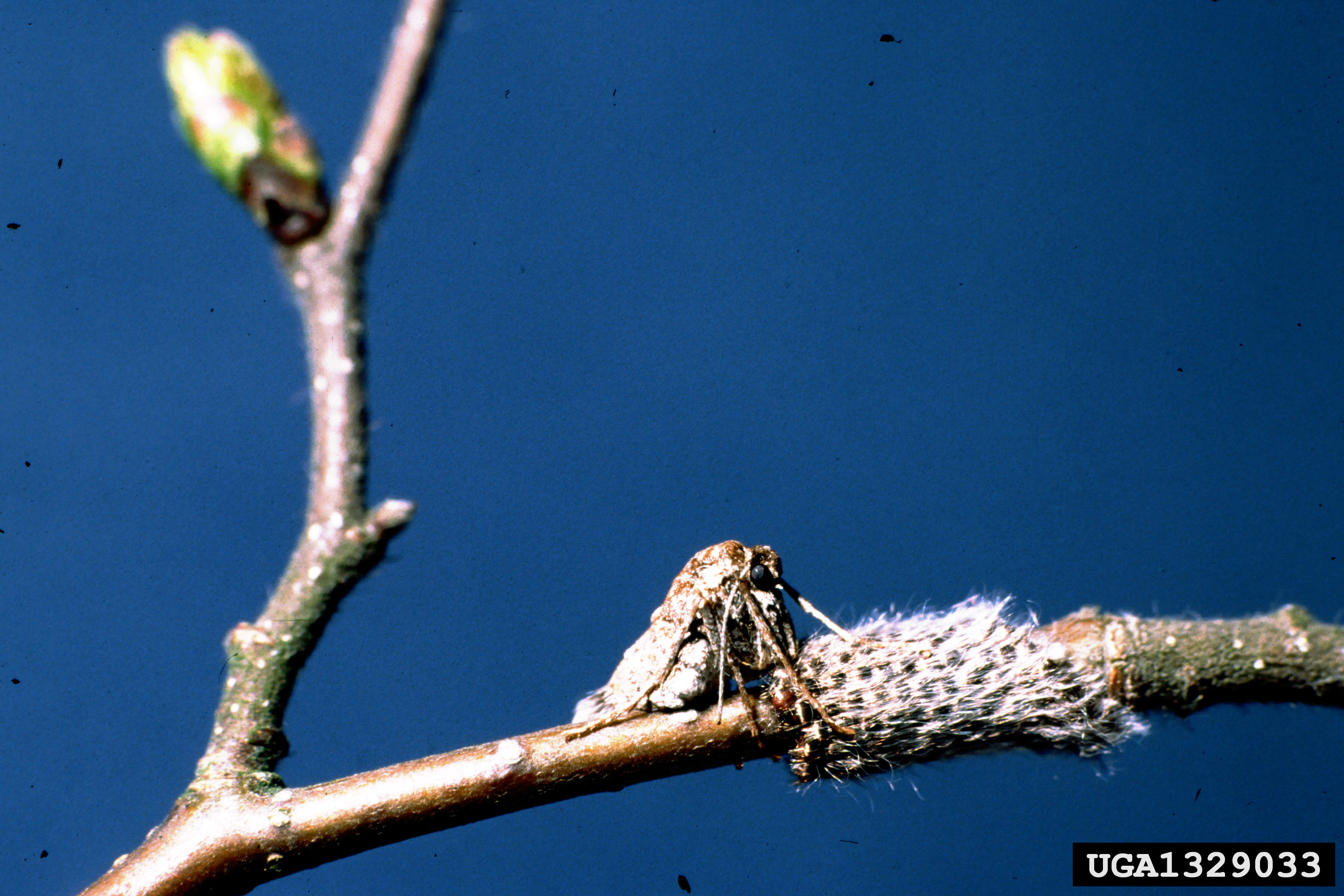
Female laying eggs

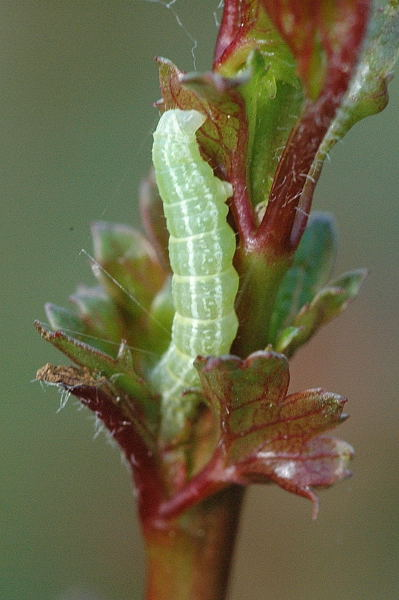
Caterpillar

== Distribution ==
It is a well-known species distributed throughout the western Palearctic region except northern Europe, Corsica, Malta, Albania, and the Greek Islands. A few isolated populations live outside of Europe in northern and eastern Turkey, Caucasus, Transcaucasus, and Turkmenistan. Alsophila aescularia has also been reported to exist in the Hyrcanian relic temperate deciduous forests of Iran along the northern slopes of Alborz Mountain Range, called the Caspian Forest.

== Description ==
The wingspan is 25–35 mm. The colour of the forewings varies between pale brownish and grayish brown. There is a well-defined usually dark brown central band. The lines are sharply toothed and on the opposite side to the band they are whitish. A prominent black dot is present on the hind wings. Darkened specimens are rare. In these the lines are extinguished or the butterfly is completely black. The females have no wings and are eight to ten millimeters long. The abdomen is brownish grey, the abdominal hair tuft is about two millimeters wide and thus narrower than the abdomen, which represents a differentiator against Alsophila aceraria. The palps are very short, the sensors are slightly toothed. The proboscis is stunted. The tibiae of the hind legs have four spurs that are very short in females.

The adults are active in March and April.

Larva

The bright pale-green larva reaches a length of about 26 mm. It is characterized by a very smooth skin and a flat head. There is a dark green dorsal line and yellowish-white lateral lines. In contrast to other geometrid caterpillars, they have an additional rudimentary abdominal leg pair in the fifth segment. Long, spider's-web like strings hang from oak trees in the southern hemisphere. The larvae hangs from one end.

The larva feeds on a range of trees: apple (Malus domestica), European plum (Prunus domestica), Zwetschge (Prunus domestica domestica), blackthorn (Prunus spinosa), bird cherry (Prunus padus), lime (Tilia species), pedunculate oak (Quercus robur), sessile oak (Quercus petraea), northern red oak (Quercus rubra), field maple Acer campestris, sycamore (Acer pseudoplatanus), elm (Ulmus species), hawthorn (Crataegus species), dog rose (Rosa canina), wild privet (Ligustrum vulgare), hornbeam (Carpinus betulus), beech (Fagus sylvatica), hazel (Corylus avellana), ash (Fraxinus excelsior), fly honeysuckle (Lonicera xylosteum), common buckthorn (Rhamnus cathartica) and silver birch (Betula pendula).
