= Alsophila =

Alsophila may refer to:

- Alsophila (moth), a genus of moth
- Alsophila (plant), a genus of tree ferns
