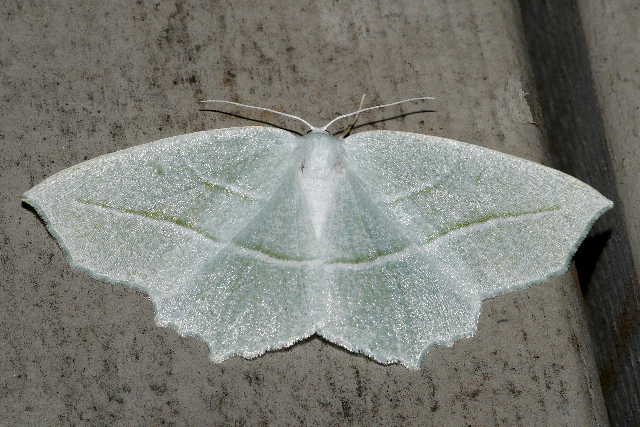

Scientific classification
- Kingdom: Animalia
- Phylum: Arthropoda
- Clade: Pancrustacea
- Class: Insecta
- Order: Lepidoptera
- Family: Geometridae
- Genus: Campaea
- Species: C. perlata

Binomial name
- Campaea perlata Guenée, 1858
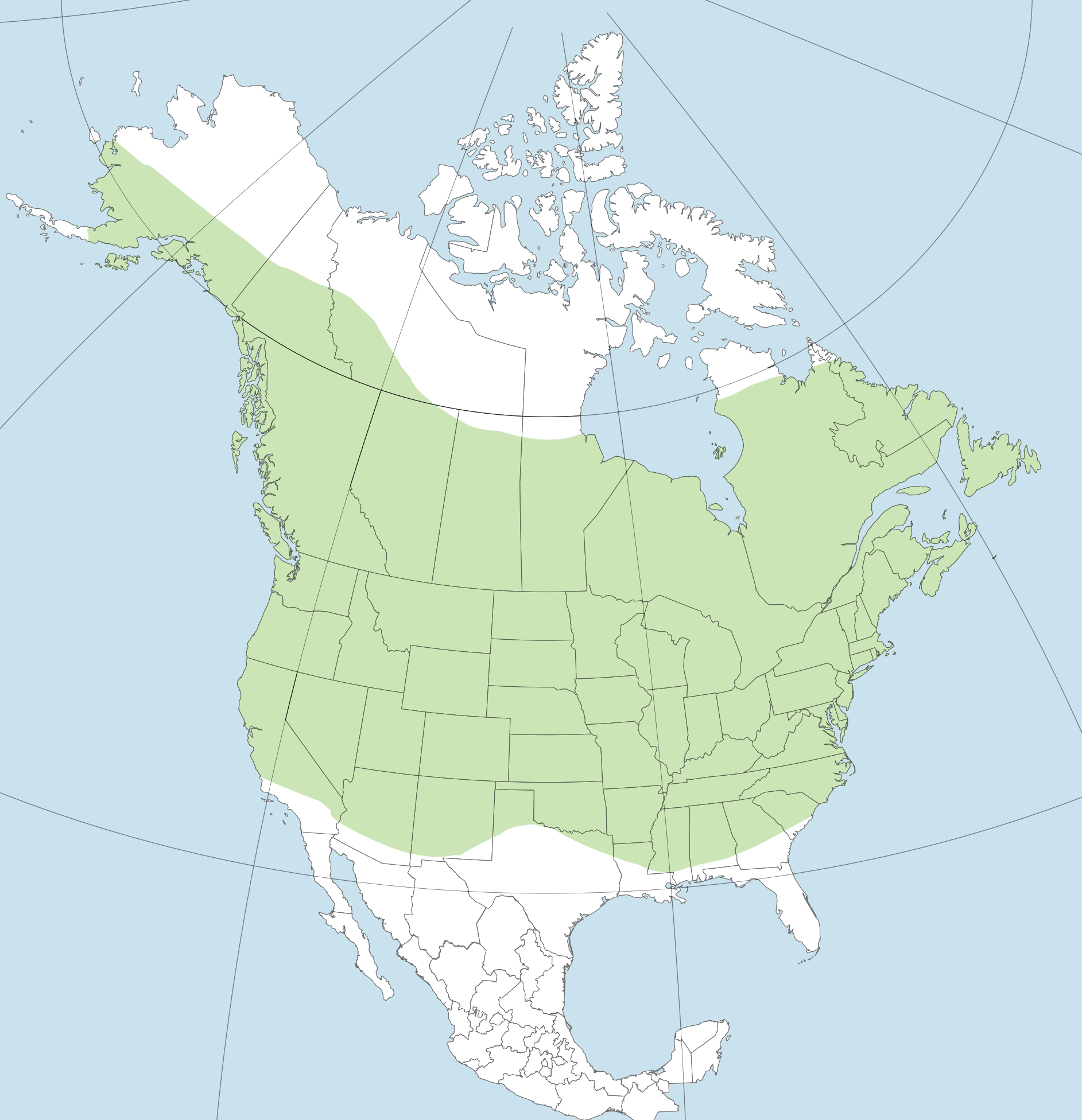

Synonyms
- Metrocampa perlata Guenée 1858

= Campaea perlata =

Pale beauty

Species of moth

Campaea perlata, the pale beauty, also known as the fringed looper (caterpillar), is a species of moth in the family Geometridae, known as geometer moths, found in North America. Some sources also name it the light emerald, though this may be confused with the related European moth Campaea margaritata. It is common throughout its range.

The name "perlata" comes from post-classical Latin for "pearly".

== Description ==
The pale beauty is a medium-sized moth with an average wingspan of about 28–51 mm. The female tends to be much larger than the male. It is pale greenish to white, with postmedial and antemedial faint lines that run continuously across the forewings and hindwings.

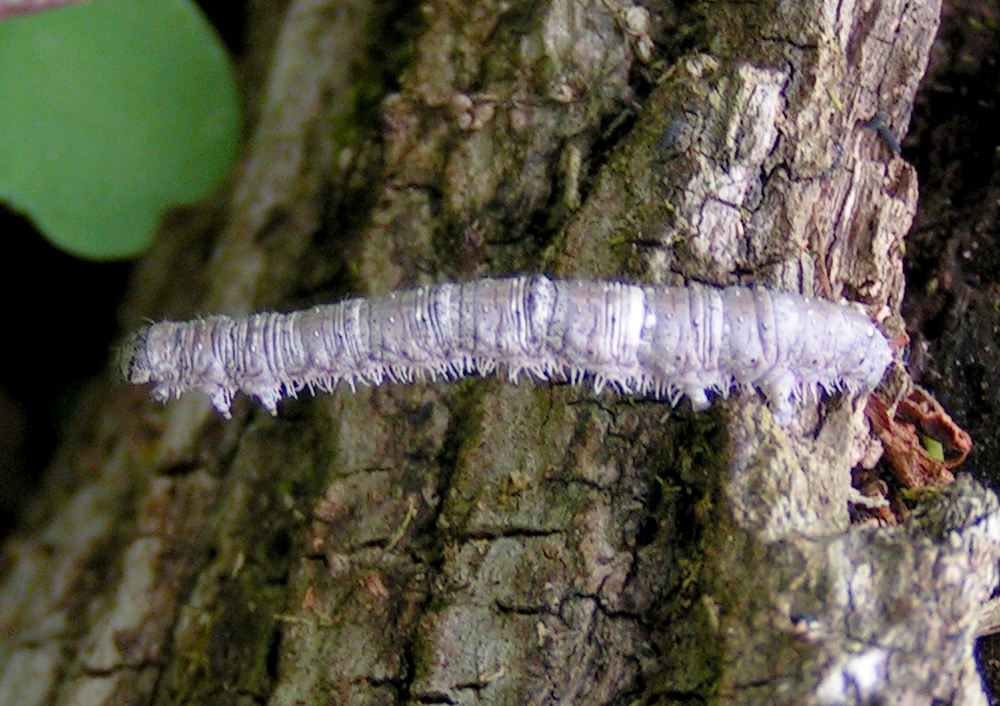
A fringed looper caterpillar, the larva of the pale beauty moth

The larva of the pale beauty falls in the category of "inchworms" or "loopers". The looping gait of these caterpillars is the result of having appendages only at the front and back of the body.

The caterpillars are about 4 cm in length and mottled gray to reddish, pale underneath, with a dark band from the top of the head to the eye. It has a fringe-like row of setae on the lower sides of the body and an extra set of prolegs on the fifth segment of the abdomen (i.e. the 8th segment of the animal). The caterpillars strongly resemble twigs and the fringe is a form of shadow eliminating camouflage.

== Range ==
This moth is found throughout most of North America in deciduous forests, woods, and parks. It is found across Canada as far as Newfoundland and Labrador and north to the Yukon. In the United States it is found in Alaska and as far south as Arizona, with some reports from Florida.

== Habitat and ecology ==
Adults can be found flying from June to September, though this may vary by region. It has two generations in a year, an overwintering generation and a summer generation. It may have only one generation per year in the far north. The overwintering caterpillars mature around May to June, and the summer generation caterpillars may mature from June to September. When the larva is fully grown, it pupates in a light green cocoon.

The larvae are general feeders and have been recorded consuming 65 different species of shrubs and trees. Larvae have antifreeze proteins that give them a strong freezing point depression. This allows them to survive low temperatures in the winter. It may overwinter on tree trunks or branches, without seeking shelter from winter conditions, similar to its European cousin Campaea margaritata.

A study showed that the pale beauty moth has a genetically fixed background preference and chooses to rest on light backgrounds to camouflage itself.

== Food plants of the larvae ==
- Alder
- Ash
- Basswood
- Beech
- Birch
- Blueberry
- Canada buffaloberry
- Cherry
- Fir
- Elm
- Hemlock
- Maple
- Oak
- Photinia
- Pine
- Poplar
- Rose
- Spruce
- Tamarack
- Willow
