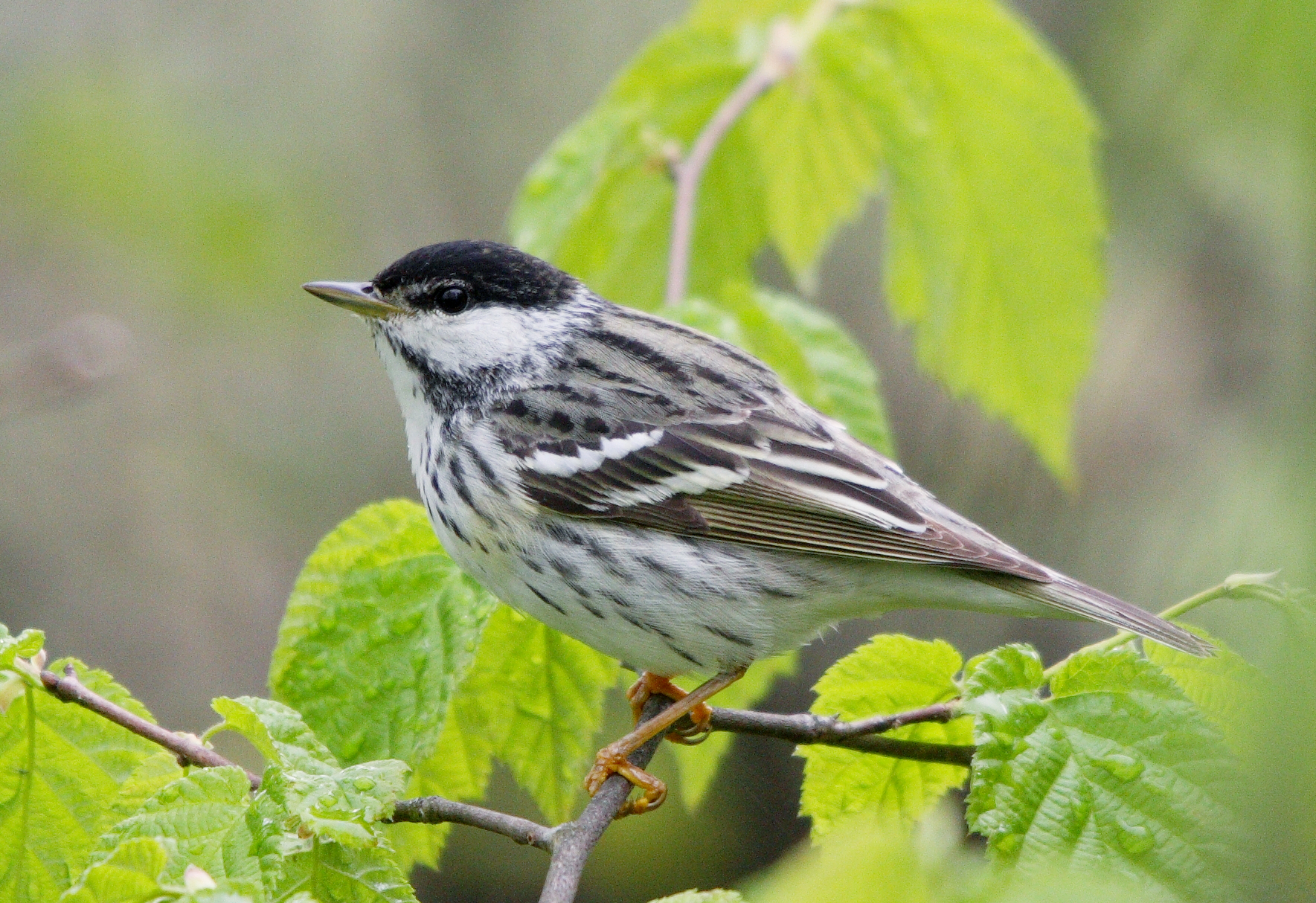

Conservation status
- Near Threatened (IUCN 3.1)

Scientific classification
- Kingdom: Animalia
- Phylum: Chordata
- Class: Aves
- Order: Passeriformes
- Family: Parulidae
- Genus: Setophaga
- Species: S. striata

Binomial name
- Setophaga striata (Forster, 1772)
- Range of S. striata (note: missing distribution in the Caribbean) Breeding range Wintering range

Synonyms
- Dendroica striata

= Blackpoll warbler =

Species of bird

The blackpoll warbler (Setophaga striata) is a New World warbler. Breeding males are mostly black and white. They have a prominent black cap, white cheeks, and white wing bars. The blackpoll breeds in forests of northern North America, from Alaska throughout most of Canada, to the Adirondack Mountains of New York as well as New England in the Northeastern United States. They are a common migrant throughout much of North America. In fall, they fly south to the Greater Antilles and the northeastern coasts of South America in a non-stop long-distance migration over open water, averaging 2,500 km (1,600 mi), one of the longest-distance non-stop overwater flights ever recorded for a migratory songbird. Rare vagrants to western Europe, they are one of the more frequent transatlantic passerine wanderers.

== Taxonomy ==
The blackpoll warbler was formally described in 1772 by the German naturalist Johann Reinhold Forster based on specimens collected near the Severn River on the west coast of Hudson Bay in Ontario, Canada. Forster placed the species in the genus Muscicapa and coined the binomial name Muscicapa striata. The specific epithet is Latin meaning "striated". The blackpoll warbler is now placed in the genus Setophaga that was introduced by the English naturalist William Swainson in 1827. The genus name Setophaga combines the Ancient Greek σης/sēs, σητος/sētos meaning "moth" with -φαγος/-phagos meaning "-eating". The species is monotypic: no subspecies are recognized.

== Description ==
Sound of the blackpoll warbler

The blackpoll warbler is a fairly small bird which attains the weight of a ballpoint pen. However, it is one of the larger of the diverse genus Setophaga (formerly Dendroica). In the species, body length can vary from 12.5 to 15 cm (4.9 to 5.9 in) and wingspan can range from 20 to 25 cm (7.9 to 9.8 in). Body mass can vary from 9.7 to 21 g (0.34 to 0.74 oz), with an average bird anywhere between 12 and 15 g (0.42 and 0.53 oz). Among standard measurements, the wing chord is 6.6 to 8 cm (2.6 to 3.1 in), the tail is 4.5 to 5.4 cm (1.8 to 2.1 in), the bill is 0.8 to 1.2 cm (0.31 to 0.47 in) and the tarsus is 1.8 to 2 cm (0.71 to 0.79 in). The summer male blackpoll warblers have dark-streaked brown backs, white faces, and black crowns. Their underparts are white with black streaks, and they display two white wing bars. The adult females essentially resemble washed-out versions of the summer males, and in particular, the females lack the strong head patterns, and their crowns and faces are shades of gray. Another outstanding physical characteristic of the species is the bright orangish-pink legs.

Non-breeding birds of this species have greenish heads, dark-streaked greenish upperparts, and yellowish breasts, with the yellow extending to the belly in young birds. Their wing bars are always present. The plumage of the blackpoll warbler is substantionally similar in appearance to the bay-breasted warbler during fall migration, resulting in the two birds sometimes being collectively called "baypoll warblers".

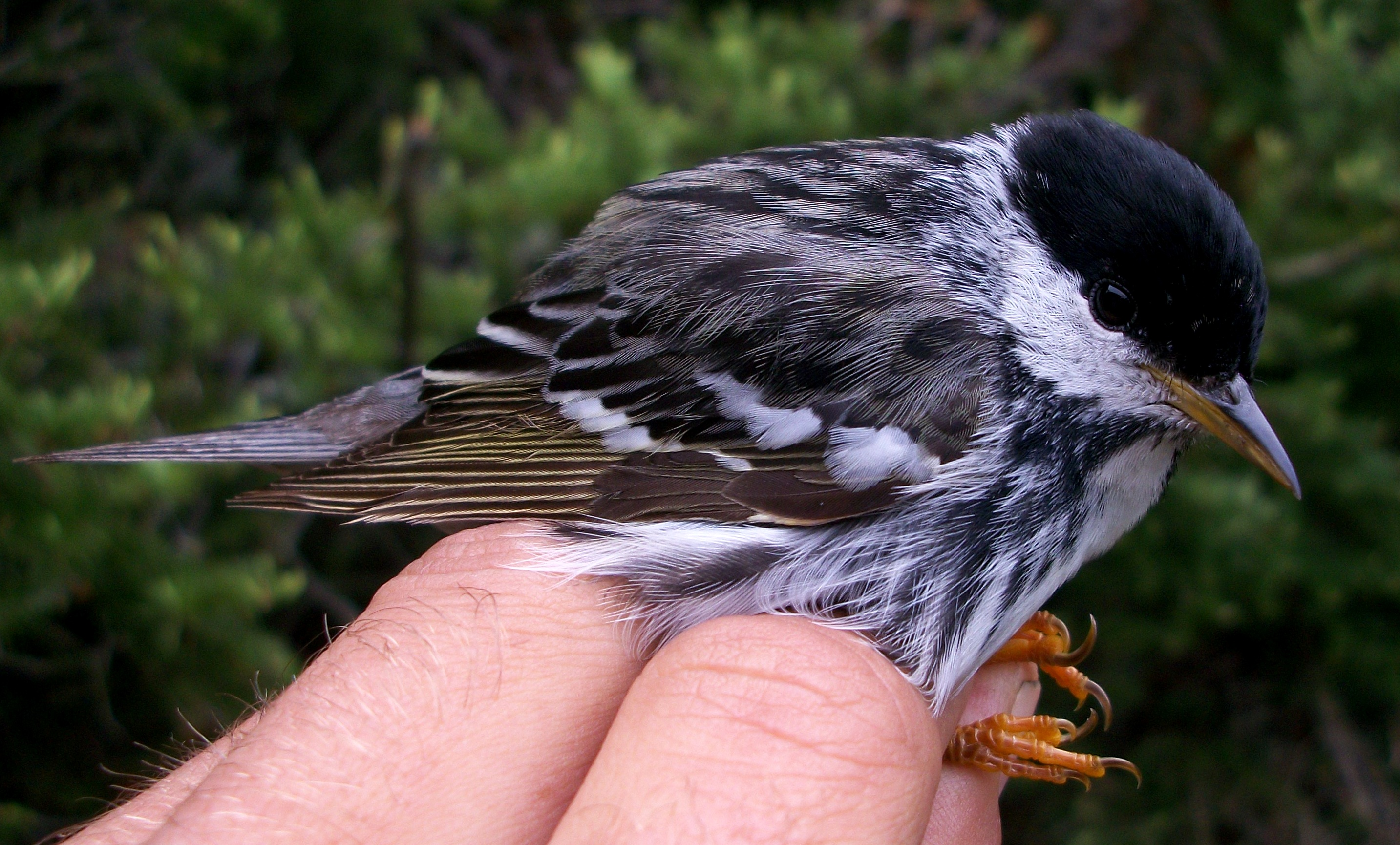
Blackpoll warbler in breeding season plumage

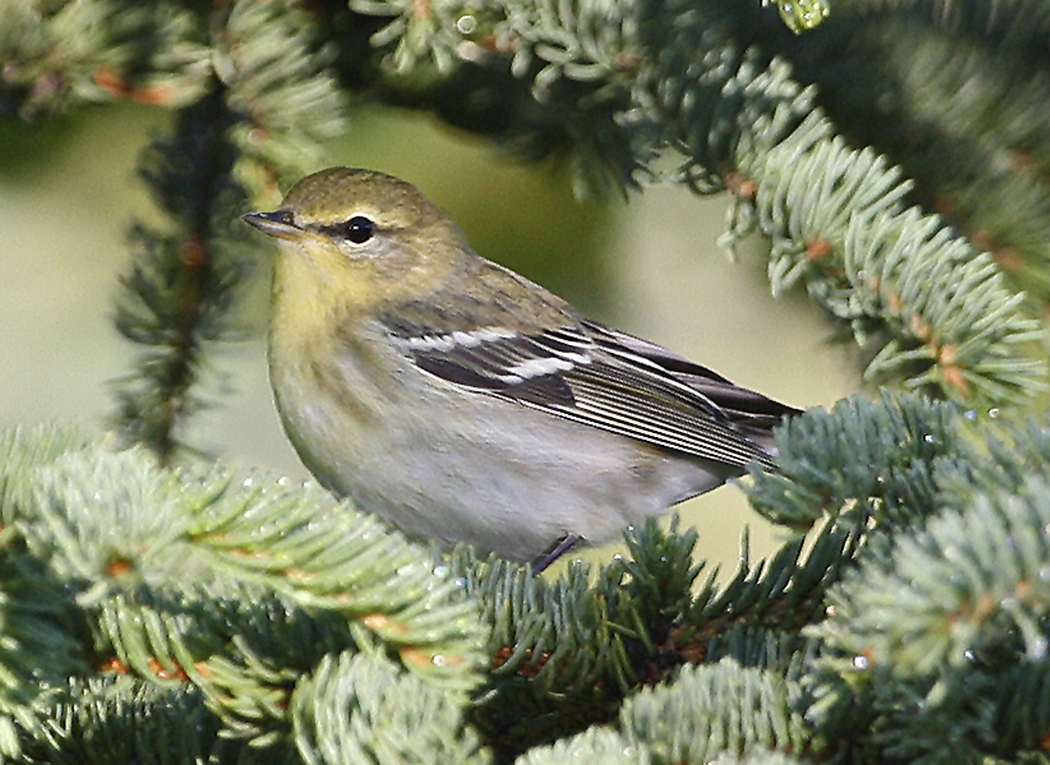
In fall plumage

== Distribution and habitat ==
In the southern portion of their breeding range, blackpoll warblers can be found on the higher elevations of mountains in woodland or brushy areas. They also spend their summers on the wooded coastal islands of Maine and the Maritime Provinces. Farther north, they have been reported throughout the boreal coniferous forest. Blackpolls breed nearer to the tundra than any other warbler.

== Behavior and ecology ==
Although fairly large for a warbler, blackpoll warblers are fairly easy to miss because of their relatively inactive foraging style and tendency to perch in dense foliage near the canopy of the trees. They are more often heard than seen, though their song is one of the highest-pitched known. Their songs are simple repetitions of high tsi notes. Their calls are thin sits.

=== Foraging and diet ===
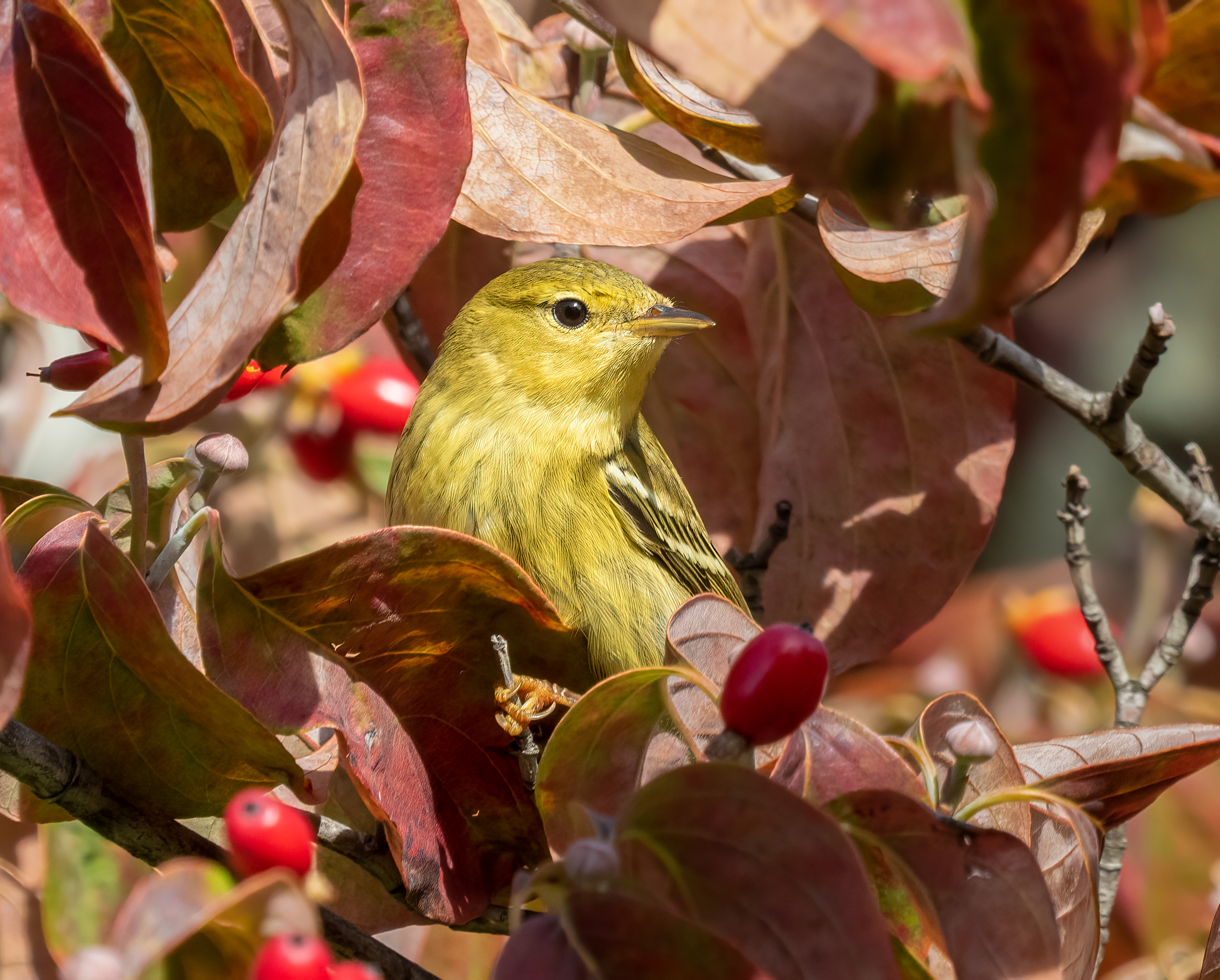
Migrating adult in a fruiting flowering dogwood tree

The blackpoll has a deliberate feeding style with occasional flitting, hovering, and hawking around branches. They are primarily insectivorous. The species appears to be quite a generalist, preying on a great diversity of adult and larval insects and spiders. Documented insect prey for the species includes lice, locusts, cankerworms, mosquitoes, webworms, ants, termites, gnats, aphids, and sawflies. It has been suggested that this species may be a spruce budworm specialist, but there is no obvious connection between the population trends of the two species. The blackpoll will opt for berries during migration and in winter. They often forage high in trees, and sometimes catch insects while in flight.

=== Breeding ===
Their breeding habitats are coniferous woodlands, especially those in which spruce trees grow. The bird's breeding ranges extend to the taiga. Blackpoll warblers commonly nest in a relatively low site of a conifer. They lay 3–5 eggs in a cup-shaped nest, rarely up to 9. The eggs are incubated for around 12 days and the young leave the nest when they are only 10 days old before they can fly well. Their parents feed them for a total of around two weeks. Mated females usually begin second nests right away and leave post-fledging parental duties to their mates. The high incidence of double brooding, coupled with and partly a function of low nest predation and parasitism rates, results in high annual productivity for this species.

=== Migration ===
The blackpoll warbler's transoceanic flight has been the subject of over twenty-five scientific studies. Sources of data include radar observations, bird banding and weights taken, dead birds recovered from field sites, and fatal obstacles. It is unknown if they feed on insects while in flight. Blackpoll warblers have the longest migration of any species of New World warbler. This is likely the reason that they are one of the later warblers to appear in spring migration, after one or more short overwater flights and a relatively prolonged movement overland through North America anytime from early May to mid-June. The peak of their migration is in late May when most warblers are on their breeding grounds.

In the fall, the birds migrate from their breeding grounds across the northern latitudes. They converge on the Northeastern United States south to Virginia starting in mid-August. Most blackpolls fly directly from northeastern North America over the Atlantic Ocean to their winter range. Data from nocturnal accidents, banding stations, and sightings have shown that blackpolls are rare autumn migrants south of Cape Hatteras, North Carolina, whereas north of Cape Hatteras they are common. Part of the fall migratory route of the blackpoll warbler is over the Atlantic Ocean from the northeastern United States to the Greater and Lesser Antilles or northern South America. Island stopovers at Bermuda and other places are evidence of migratory pathways. To accomplish this flight, the blackpoll warbler nearly doubles its body mass in staging areas and takes advantage of a shift in prevailing wind direction to direct it to its destination. When they fly southward over the Atlantic, they burn 0.08 g of fat every hour. This route averages 3,000 km (1,900 mi) over water, requiring a potentially nonstop flight of around 72 to 88 hours. They travel at a speed of about 27 mph (43 km/h). Blackpolls can weigh more than 20 g (0.71 oz) when they leave the United States and lose 4 or more grams by the time they reach South America. Some of the blackpolls land in Bermuda before going on. Some birds, often with lower body weights, do not make it.

Using a tiny light-level geolocator biologists have proven that the black poll flies an average of 2540 km (2270 to 2770 km) non-stop over an average of 62 h, up to 3 days, corresponding to about 41 km/h. In 2013, 37 blackpolls from Vermont and Nova Scotia carried a miniaturized geolocator weighing 0.5 g with the harness on their back. The device recorded light levels, from which longitudes and latitudes could be estimated, and in 2014 the scientists recovered five of the original 37. Four of the five birds departed from western Nova Scotia between September 25 and October 21, and traveled at speeds between 10.7 and 13.4 meters per second. The study revealed that the spring migration overland and the autumn routes overwater were "dramatically different". When the flight distance per body mass was compared to other birds, only the ruby-throated hummingbird might travel more kilometres per gram (estimated around 210–280 km/g vs. 233 km/g for blackpolls).
