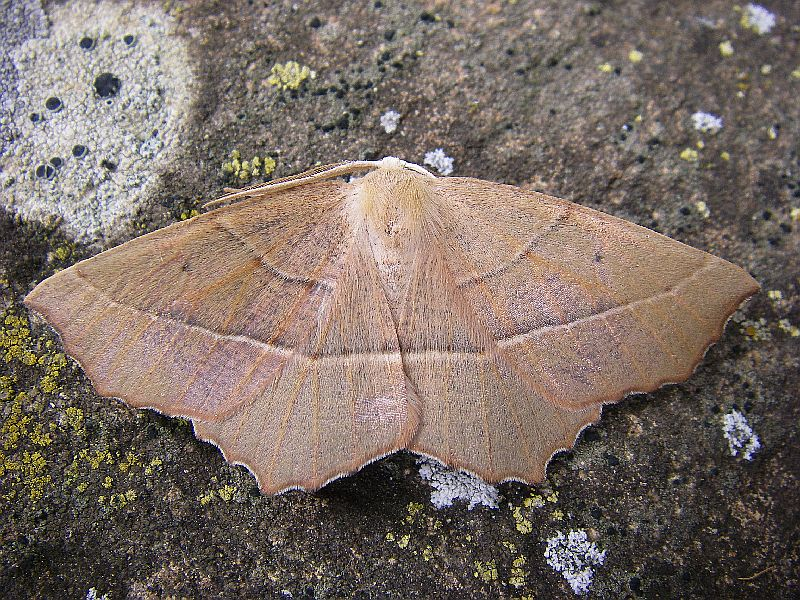

Scientific classification
- Kingdom: Animalia
- Phylum: Arthropoda
- Clade: Pancrustacea
- Class: Insecta
- Order: Lepidoptera
- Family: Geometridae
- Genus: Campaea
- Species: C. honoraria

Binomial name
- Campaea honoraria (Denis & Schiffermüller, 1775)

Synonyms
- Geometra honoraria Denis & Shiffermüller, 1775; Phalaena ilicaria de Villers, 1789

= Campaea honoraria =

Species of moth

Campaea honoraria, the embellished thorn, is a species of moth in the family Geometridae. It is found in most of southern and central Europe. The species was first described by Michael Denis and Ignaz Schiffermüller in 1775.

The length of the forewings is 20–23 mm for males and 35–38 mm for females. Adults are on wing from April to mid June and again from July to September in two generations per year.

The larvae feed on Quercus, Betula, Ulmus, Fagus and Prunus species. The species overwinters in the pupal stage.
