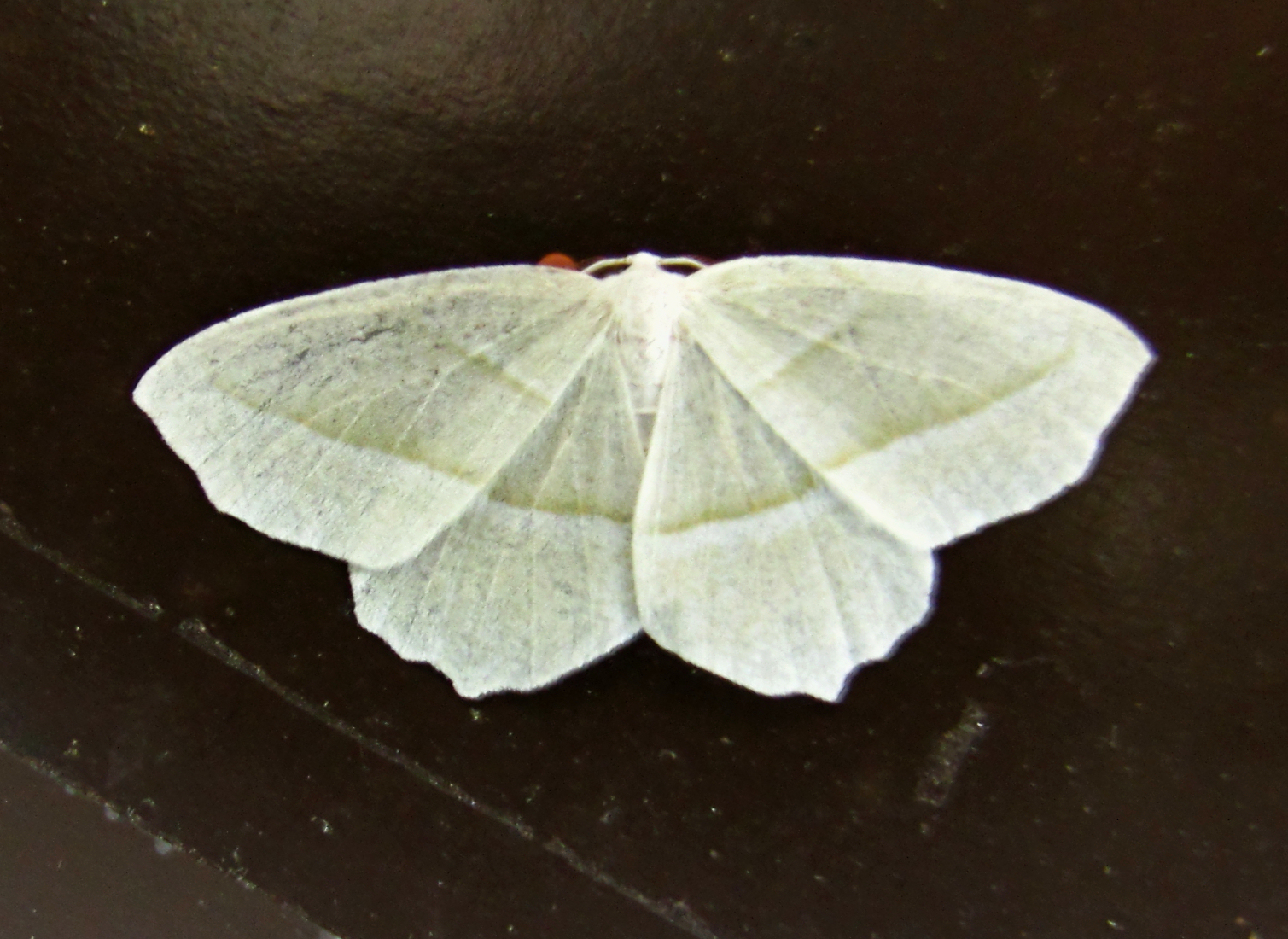
- Campaea perlata

Scientific classification
- Kingdom: Animalia
- Phylum: Arthropoda
- Class: Insecta
- Order: Lepidoptera
- Family: Geometridae
- Subfamily: Ennominae
- Tribe: Campaeini
- Genus: Campaea; Lamarck, 1816

= Campaea =

Genus of moths

Campaea is a genus of moths in the family Geometridae first described by Jean-Baptiste Lamarck in 1816.

== Species ==
Based on Species 2000 and ITIS Catalogue of Life:

- Campaea adsociaria
- Campaea approximata
- Campaea biseriata
- Campaea bupleuraria
- Campaea clausa
- Campaea decoraria
- Campaea dehaliaria
- Campaea dulcinaria
- Campaea excisaria
- Campaea haliaria
- Campaea honoraria (Denis & Schiffermüller, 1775) – embellished thorn
- Campaea honorifica
- Campaea ilicaria
- Campaea margaritata (Linnaeus, 1767) – light emerald
- Campaea olivata
- Campaea parallela
- Campaea perlaria
- Campaea perlata (Guenée, 1857) – pale beauty
- Campaea pictarorum
- Campaea praegrandaria
- Campaea reisseri
- Campaea rubrociliata
- Campaea sesquistriataria
- Campaea similaria
- Campaea triangularis
- Campaea vernaria
- Campaea virescens
- Campaea viridoperlata
- Campaea vitriolata
- Campaea zawiszae

== Gallery ==
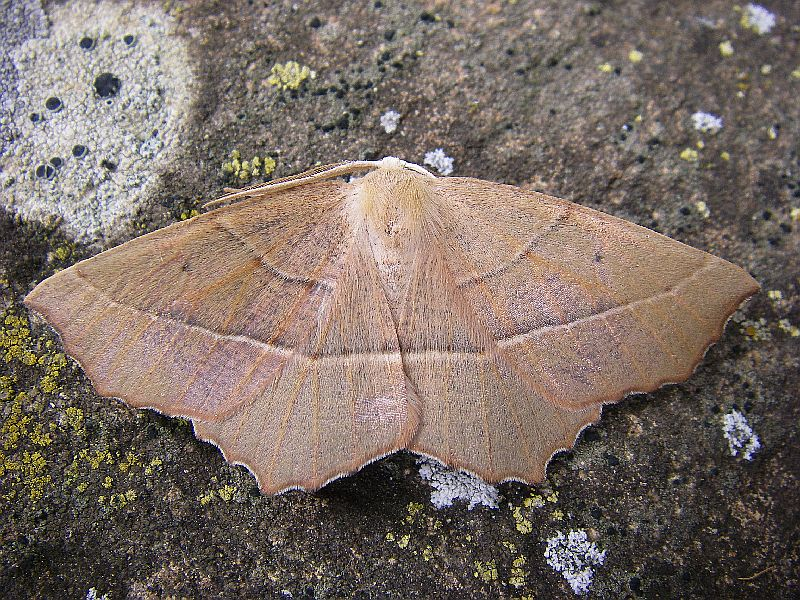
Campaea honoraria

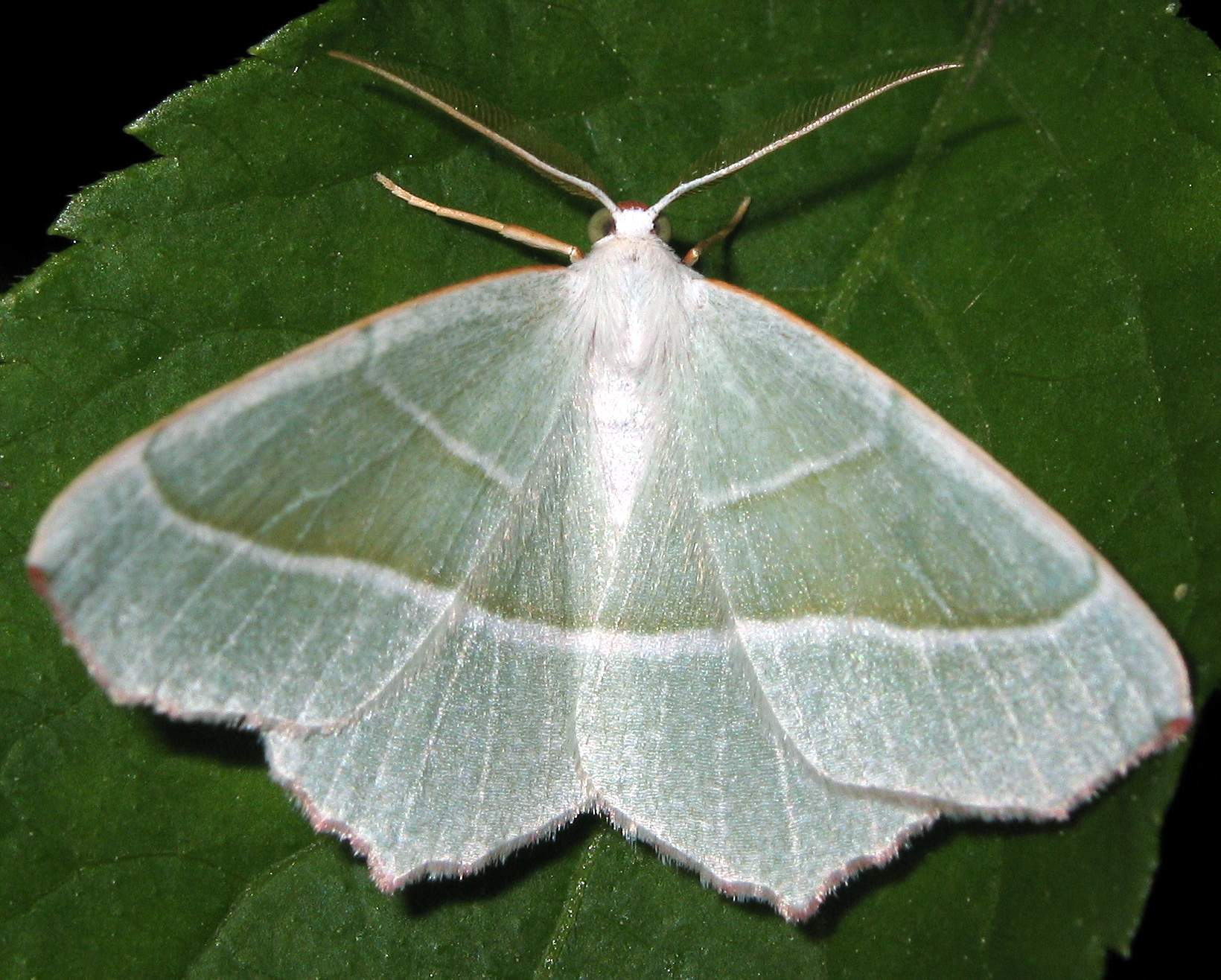
Campaea margaritata on leaf

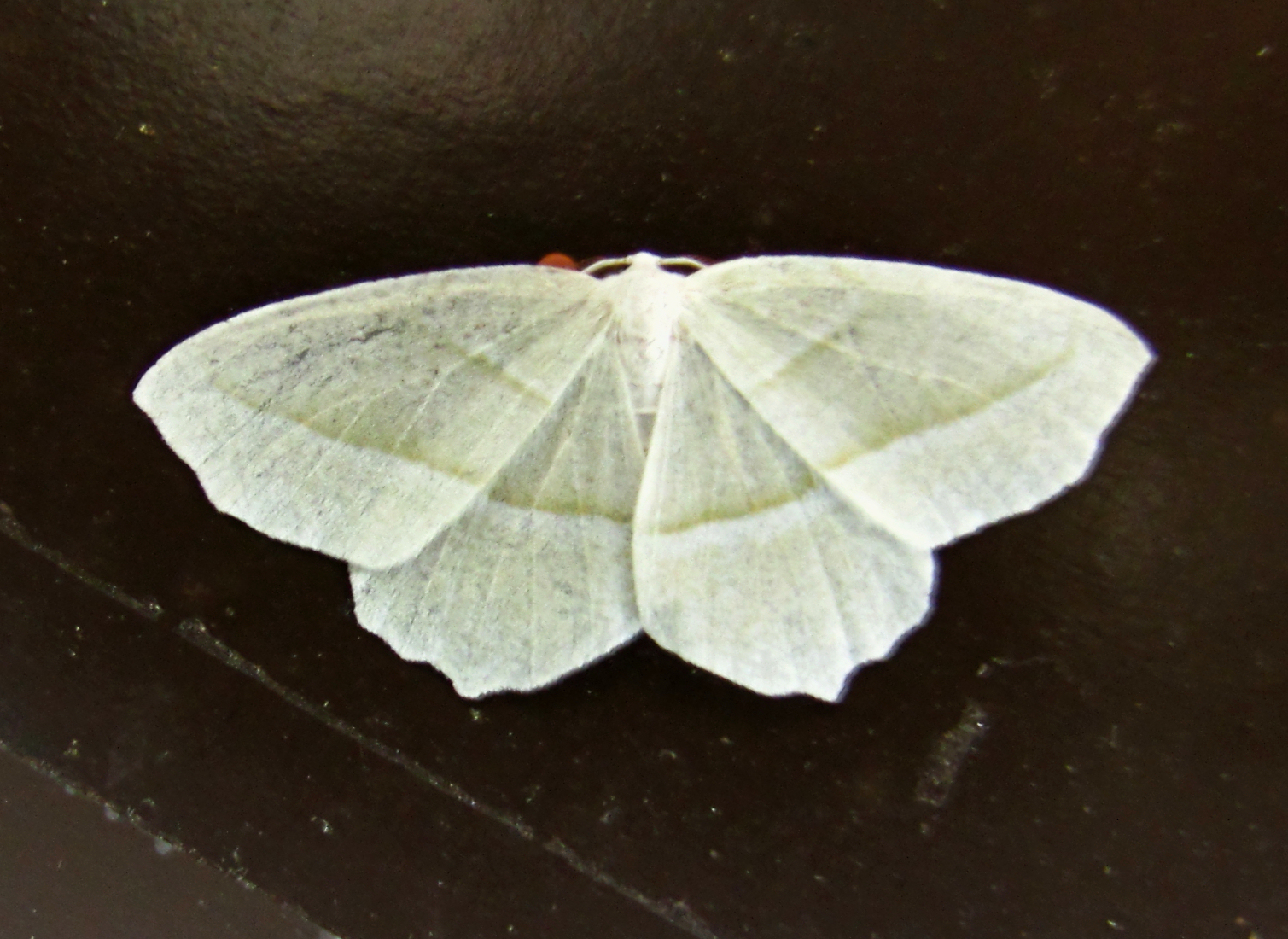
Campaea perlata in Bon Echo Provincial Park, Ontario

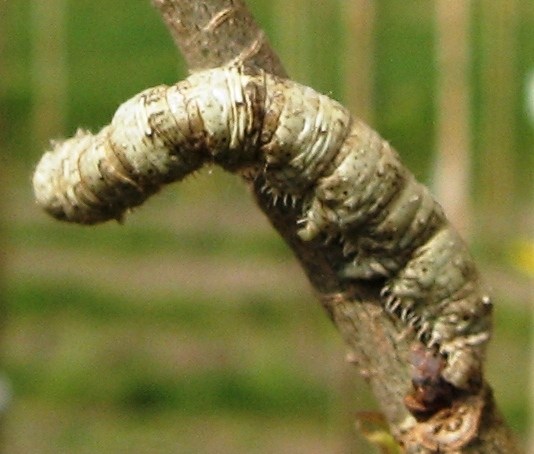
Campaea margaritata larva on elm, Glimmen, Netherlands

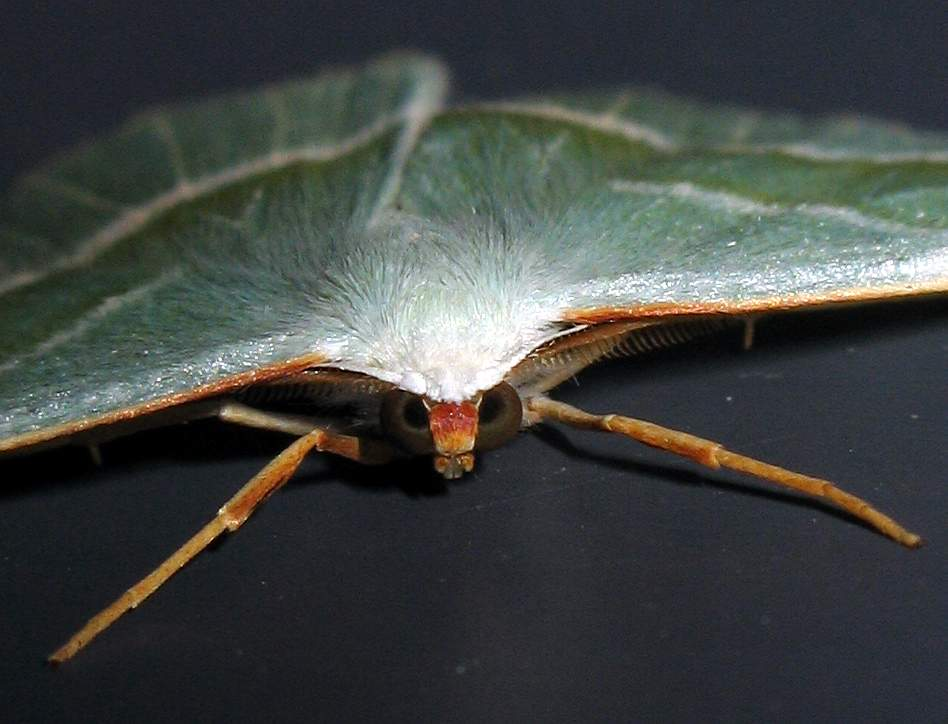
Close-up of Campaea margaritata head and forelegs
