= Proleg =

Anatomical structure

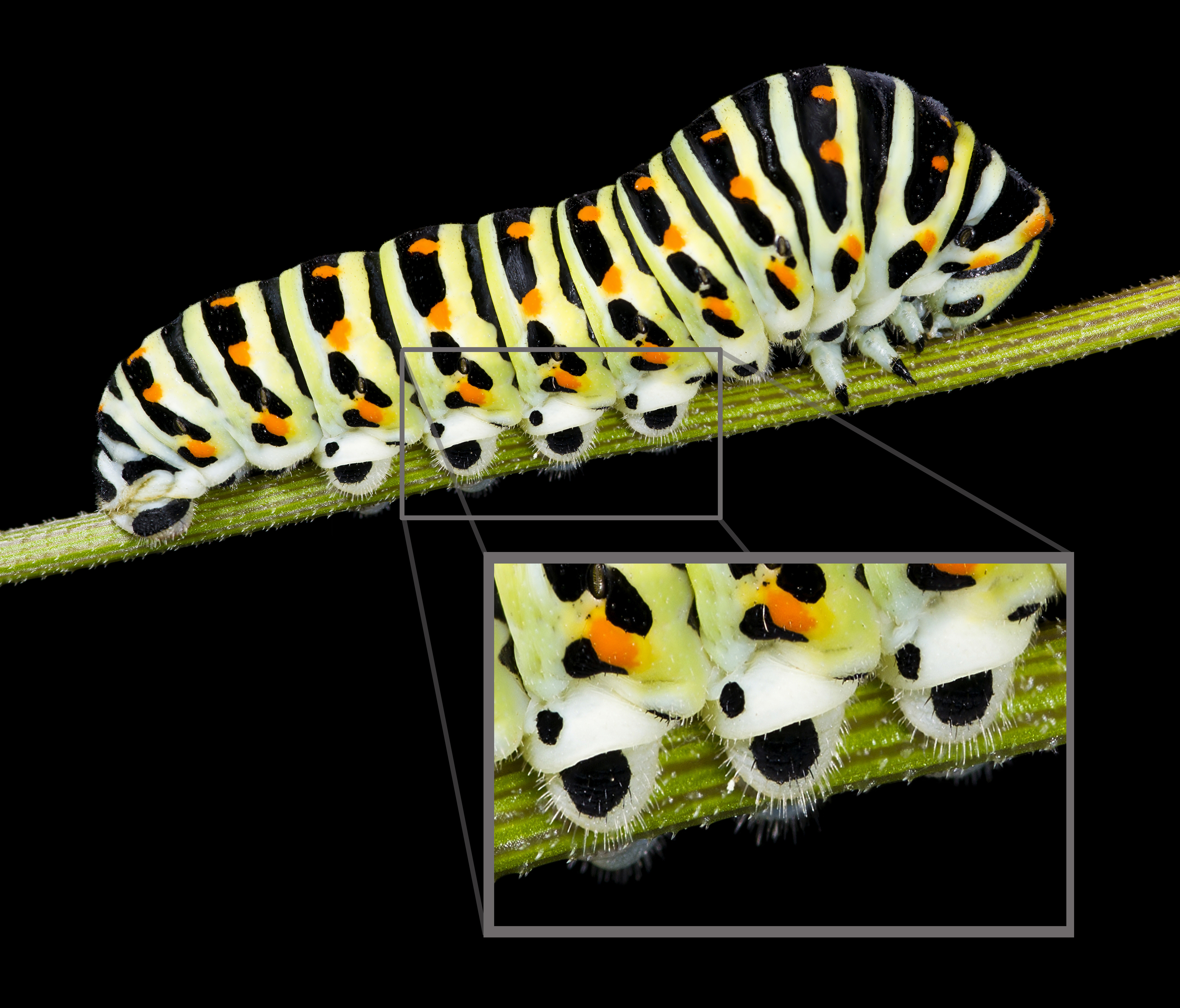
Lepidoptera: Papilio machaon caterpillar with four pairs of medial prolegs and a pair of anal prolegs

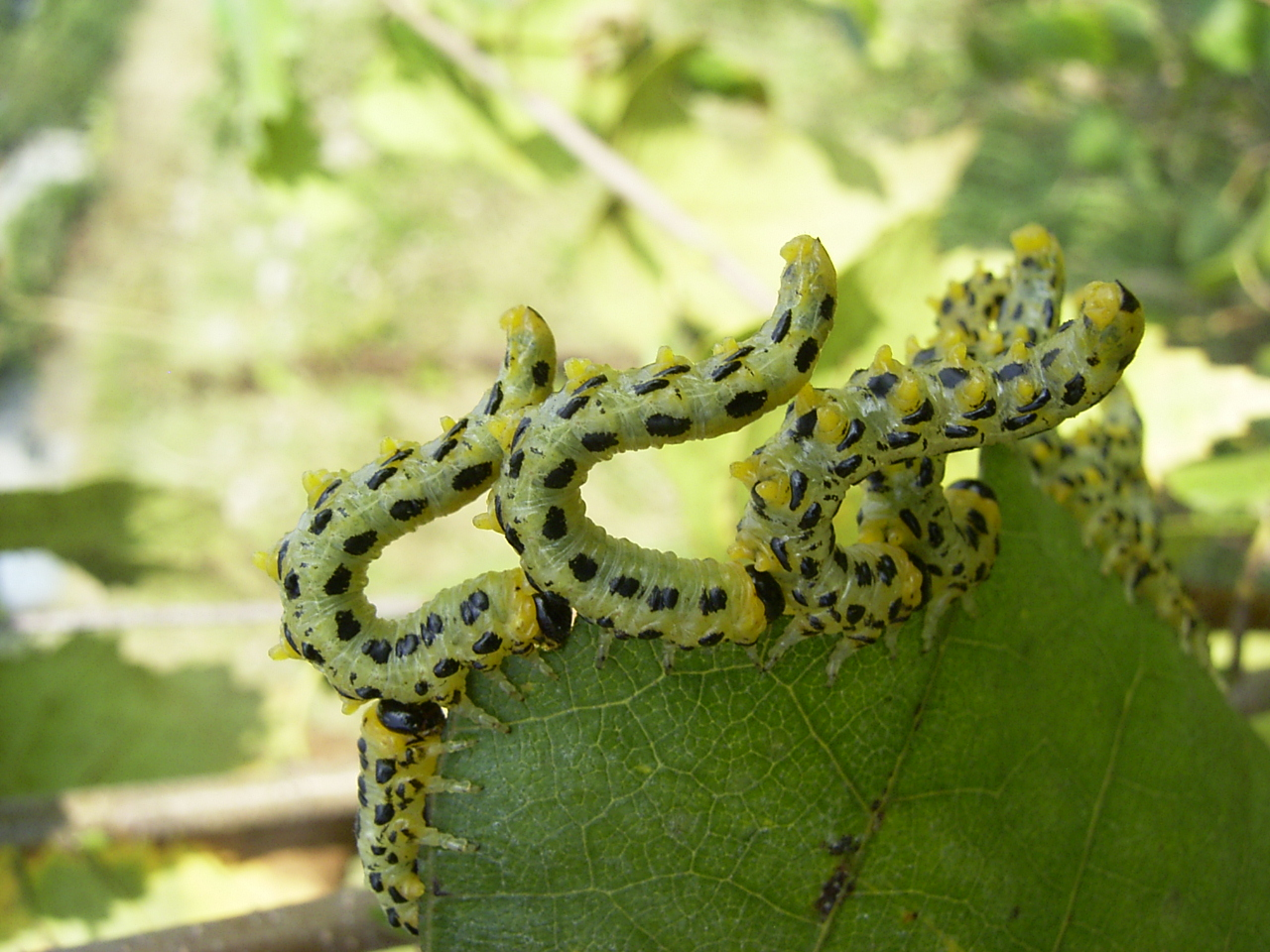
Hymenoptera: Craesus septentrionalis caterpillars with seven pairs of prolegs

A proleg is a small, fleshy, stub structure found on the ventral surface of the abdomen of most larval forms of insects of the order Lepidoptera, though they can also be found on larvae of insects such as sawflies.

== Variations ==
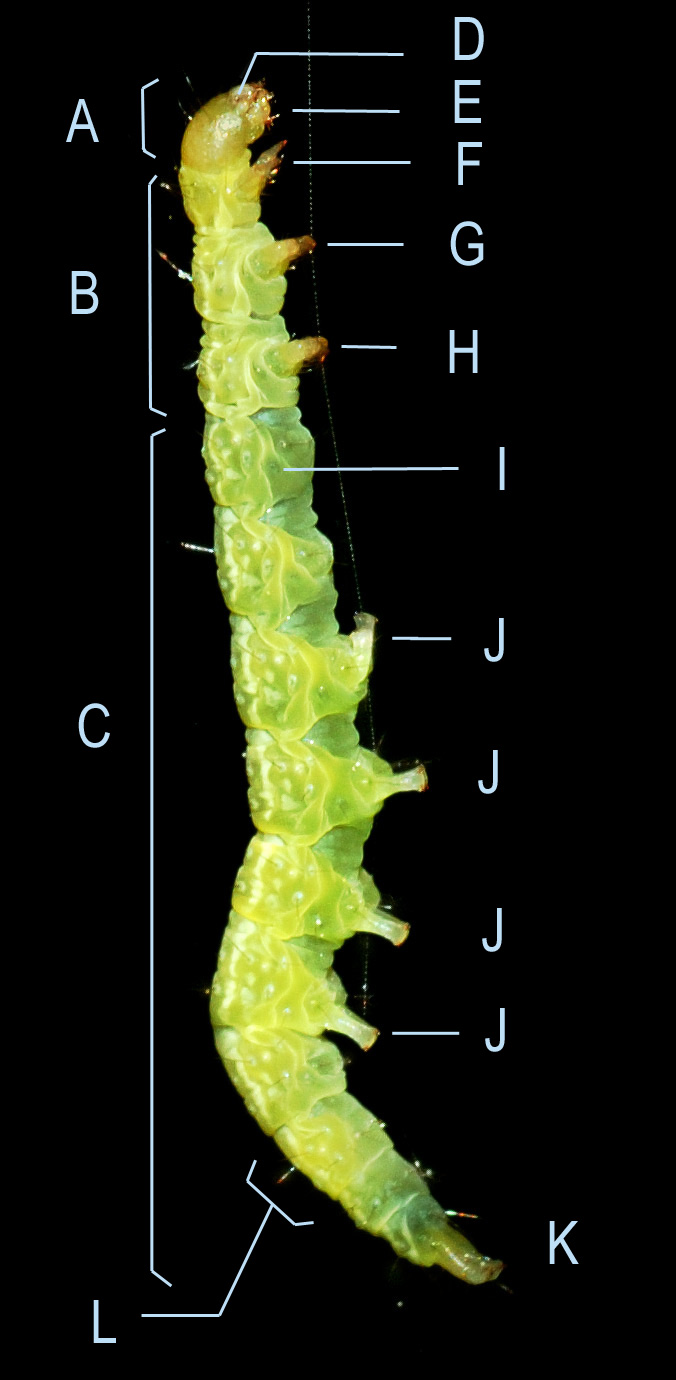
J: medial prolegs K: anal proleg (F, G, and H: true legs)

In all the orders in which they appear, mainly Hymenoptera and Lepidoptera, prolegs of any form evolved independently of each other by convergent evolution. They appear to have evolved from ancient inactive genes that have since been activated again.

Prolegs of lepidopteran larvae have a small circle of gripping hooks, called "crochets". The arrangement of the crochets can be helpful in identification to family level. Although the point has been debated, prolegs are not widely regarded as true legs, derived from the primitive uniramous limbs. Certainly in their morphology they are not jointed, and so lack the five segments (coxa, trochanter, femur, tibia, tarsus) of thoracic insect legs. Prolegs do have limited musculature, but much of their movement is hydraulically powered.

== Number of prolegs for various insect larvae ==
Number of prolegs on insect larvae at abdominal segments A1–A9/10=S4-12/13 (T1–3: thorax segments with 6 legs)
Larvae of	Group/ Family	Order	A1=S4	A2=S5	A3=S6	A4=S7	A5=S8	A6=S9	A7=S10	A8=S11	A9/10=S12/13 (anal proleg pygopodium)	legs total incl T1–3
Butterflies/Moths	many	Lepidoptera	-	-	2	2	2	2	-	-	2	16
Archaic moths	Micropterygidae	Lepidoptera	2	2	2	2	2	2	2	2	2	24
Owlet moths and allies	Noctuoidea (some)	Lepidoptera	-	-	-	2	2	2	-	-	2	14
Owlet moths and allies	Noctuoidea (some)	Lepidoptera	-	-	-	-	2	2	-	-	2	12
Geometer moths	Geometridae	Lepidoptera	-	-	-	-	-	2	-	-	2	10
Geometer moths	Geometridae (very few species)	Lepidoptera	-	-	-	-	2	2	-	-	2	12
Sawflies	Symphyta (many)	Hymenoptera	-	2	2	2	2	2	2	2	2	22
Sawflies	Symphyta (some)	Hymenoptera	-	2	2	2	2	2	2	-	2	20
Sawflies	Symphyta (some)	Hymenoptera	-	2	2	2	2	2	-	-	2	18
some? Pamphiliidae	Pamphiliinae	Hymenoptera	-	-	-	-	-	-	-	-	2	8
Mecoptera	all	Mecoptera	2	2	2	2	2	2	2	2	2	24
Caddisflies	all	Trichoptera	-	-	-	-	-	-	-	-	2	8

Additional (stubby) prolegs on segment 8 have been reported on the Geometridae species Campaea perlata and Alsophila pometaria.

== See also ==
- Terrestrial locomotion in animals
