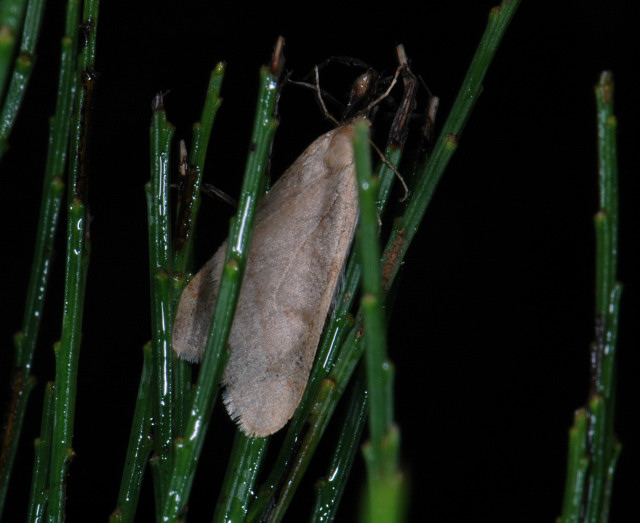

Scientific classification
- Domain: Eukaryota
- Kingdom: Animalia
- Phylum: Arthropoda
- Class: Insecta
- Order: Lepidoptera
- Family: Geometridae
- Genus: Alsophila
- Species: A. aceraria

Binomial name
- Alsophila aceraria (Denis & Schiffermüller, 1775)

Synonyms
- Geometra aceraria Denis & Schiffermüller, 1775; Phalaena (Geometra) quadripunctaria Esper, 1801; Phalaena (Geometra) mellearia Scharfenberg, 1805

= Alsophila aceraria =

Species of moth

Alsophila aceraria is a species of moth in the family Geometridae. It is found from south-western Europe and France to Germany, Austria, Italy, western Ukraine, the Balkan Peninsula, the southern Crimea, the Caucasus and Transcaucasus.

The wingspan is 24–33 mm. Adults are on wing from mid October to mid December in one generation per year.

The larvae feed on Quercus robur, Quercus petraea, Acer campestre, Fagus, Carpinus and Prunus species. The larvae can be found from April to June. The species overwinters as an egg.
