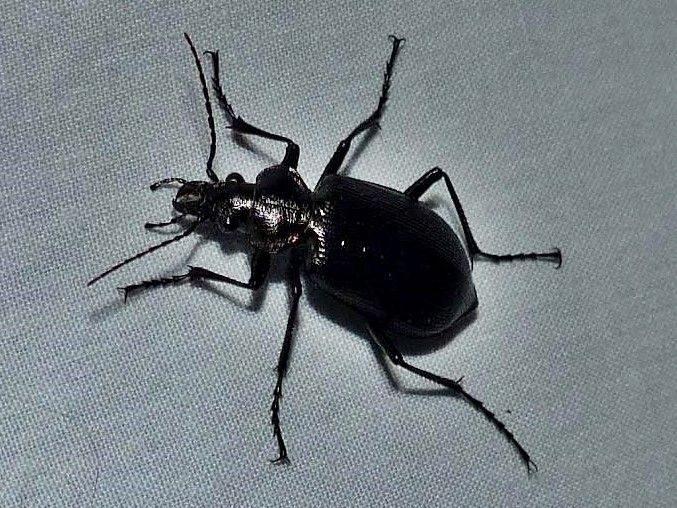

Scientific classification
- Domain: Eukaryota
- Kingdom: Animalia
- Phylum: Arthropoda
- Class: Insecta
- Order: Coleoptera
- Suborder: Adephaga
- Family: Carabidae
- Genus: Calosoma
- Species: C. frigidum

Binomial name
- Calosoma frigidum Kirby, 1837

Synonyms
- Calosoma levettei Casey, 1897; Caminara frigida

= Calosoma frigidum =

Species of beetle

Calosoma frigidum, also known as the cold-country caterpillar hunter, is a species of ground beetle in the subfamily Carabinae. It was first described by William Kirby in 1837. Occurring throughout southern Canada and the United States, it is about 16mm to 27mm long and black, with rows of pits or dots along its elytra. These pits are an iridescent blue/green, and larger than the pits of many other Calosoma species. It can be found in wooded areas and is active at night, while hiding under debris by day. Increased soil temperature, such as that caused by forest fire, is known to cause adult C. frigidum beetles to leave their burrows.
