= Inurois =

Scientific classification
- Kingdom: Animalia
- Phylum: Arthropoda
- Class: Insecta
- Order: Lepidoptera
- Family: Geometridae
- Genus: Inurois; Butler, 1879

Genus of moths

Inurois is a genus of moths in the family Geometridae first described by Arthur Gardiner Butler in 1879. It contains six species.

== Species ==
- Inurois brumneus Viidalepp, 1986
- Inurois fletcheri Inoue, 1954
- Inurois fumosa Inoue, 1944
- Inurois membranaria (Christoph, 1881)
- Inurois tenuis Butler, 1879
- Inurois ussuriensis Viidalepp, 1986
