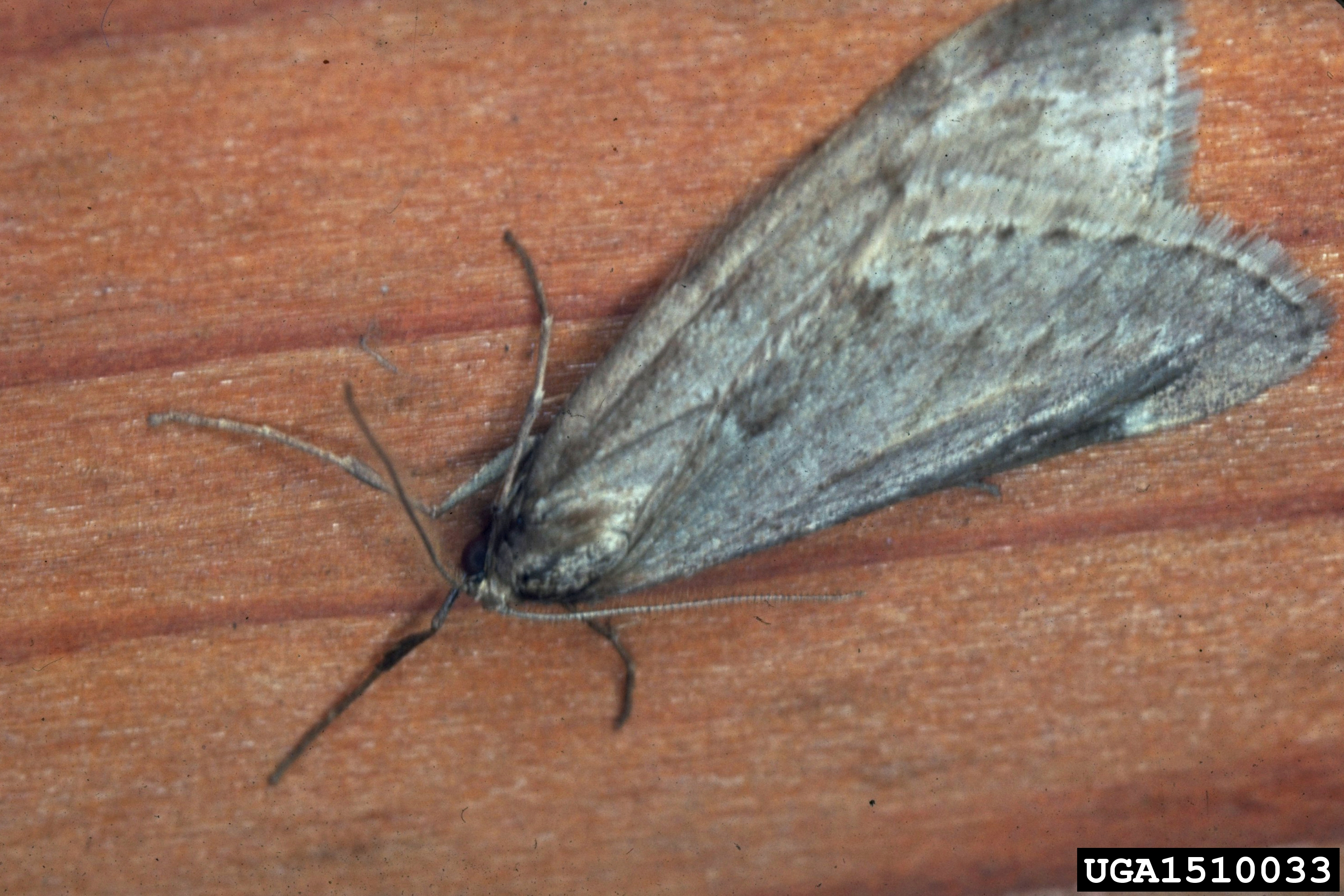

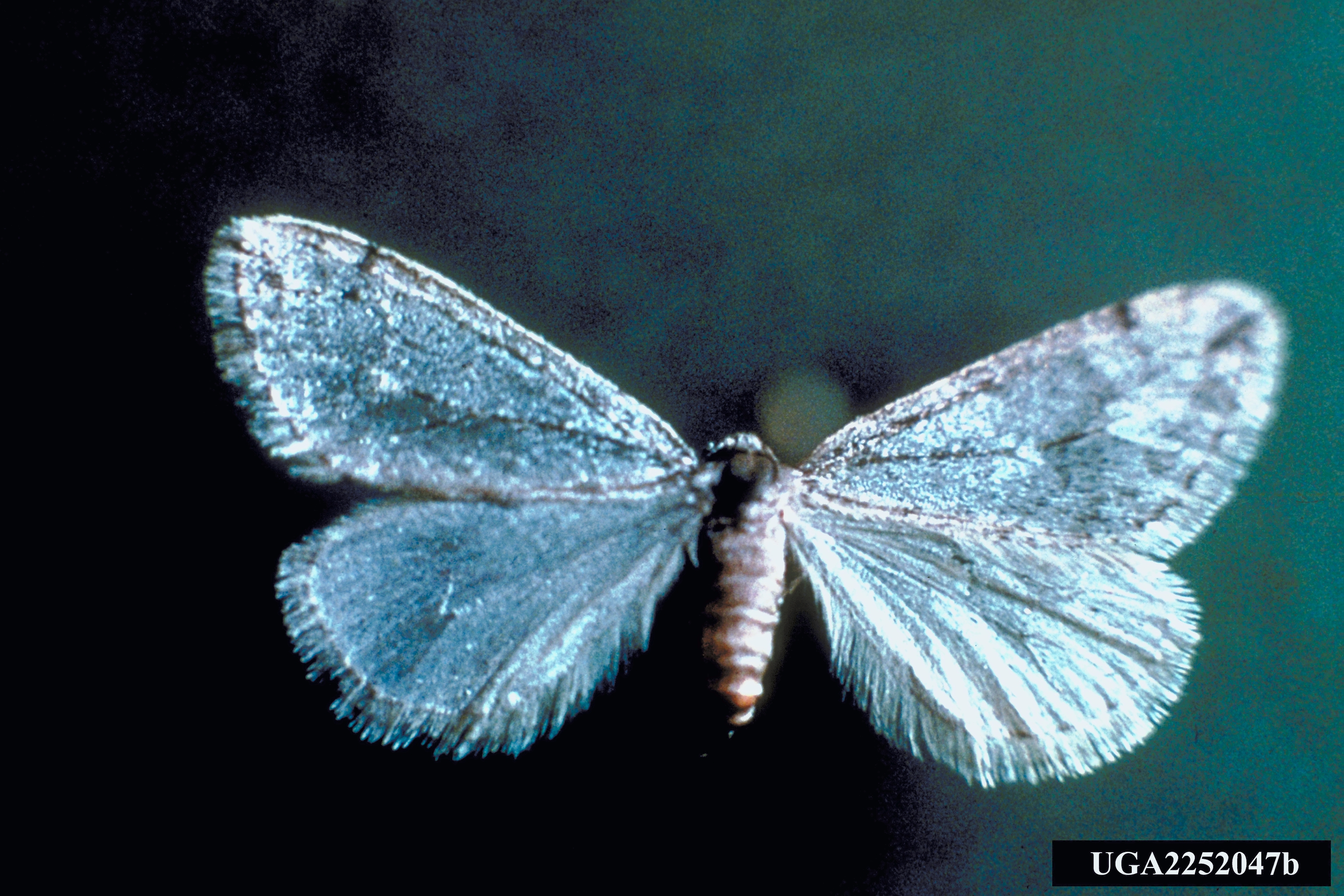

Scientific classification
- Kingdom: Animalia
- Phylum: Arthropoda
- Clade: Pancrustacea
- Class: Insecta
- Order: Lepidoptera
- Family: Geometridae
- Genus: Alsophila
- Species: A. pometaria

Binomial name
- Alsophila pometaria (Harris, 1841)

Synonyms
- Alsophila restituens (Walker, 1860); Alsophila autumnata (Packard, 1876)

= Alsophila pometaria =

Species of moth

Alsophila pometaria, the fall cankerworm, is a moth of the family Geometridae. It is found in North America from Nova Scotia west to Alberta, south to Colorado and California.

== Description ==
The caterpillars grow to about 25 mm long. In color, they vary from light green to a dark brownish green. Light green caterpillars have white lines running down the body from the head to the tip of the abdomen while the darker caterpillars have a black stripe the length of their back. Larvae have three pairs of legs on their thorax and three pairs of prolegs on their abdomen. The first pair of prolegs (on segment 8, unexpected in Geometridae as opposed to Noctuidae) is much smaller than the last two pairs (the one on segment 9 typical for geometer moths and the pygopodium at the end of the animal). The pupa is wrapped in a silk cocoon and is buried just beneath the surface of the ground.

Adult males have a 25–35 mm wingspan. The forewings are glossy brown and crossed with irregular white bands. The females are brownish gray, wingless, and 10–12 mm long. Eggs are grayish brown with a dot and ring on the top and are less than 1 mm in diameter.

== Biology ==
The larvae feed on a large variety of deciduous trees and shrubs, including Ulmus, Fraxinus and Acer. Other recorded hosts include hackberry, oak, various members of the rose family, walnut and willow. The larvae hatch and are active in the spring. These insects are called fall cankerworms because the females emerge from the soil in November, mate and lay their eggs in clusters on hardwood trees.

There are some natural enemies of this species. Many birds eat the caterpillars. The ground beetle, Calosoma frigidum also feeds on the caterpillars. The wasp, Telenomus alsophilae, parasitizes the eggs. The Aleiodes species Aleiodes gastritor is a parasitoid of this species' caterpillars.

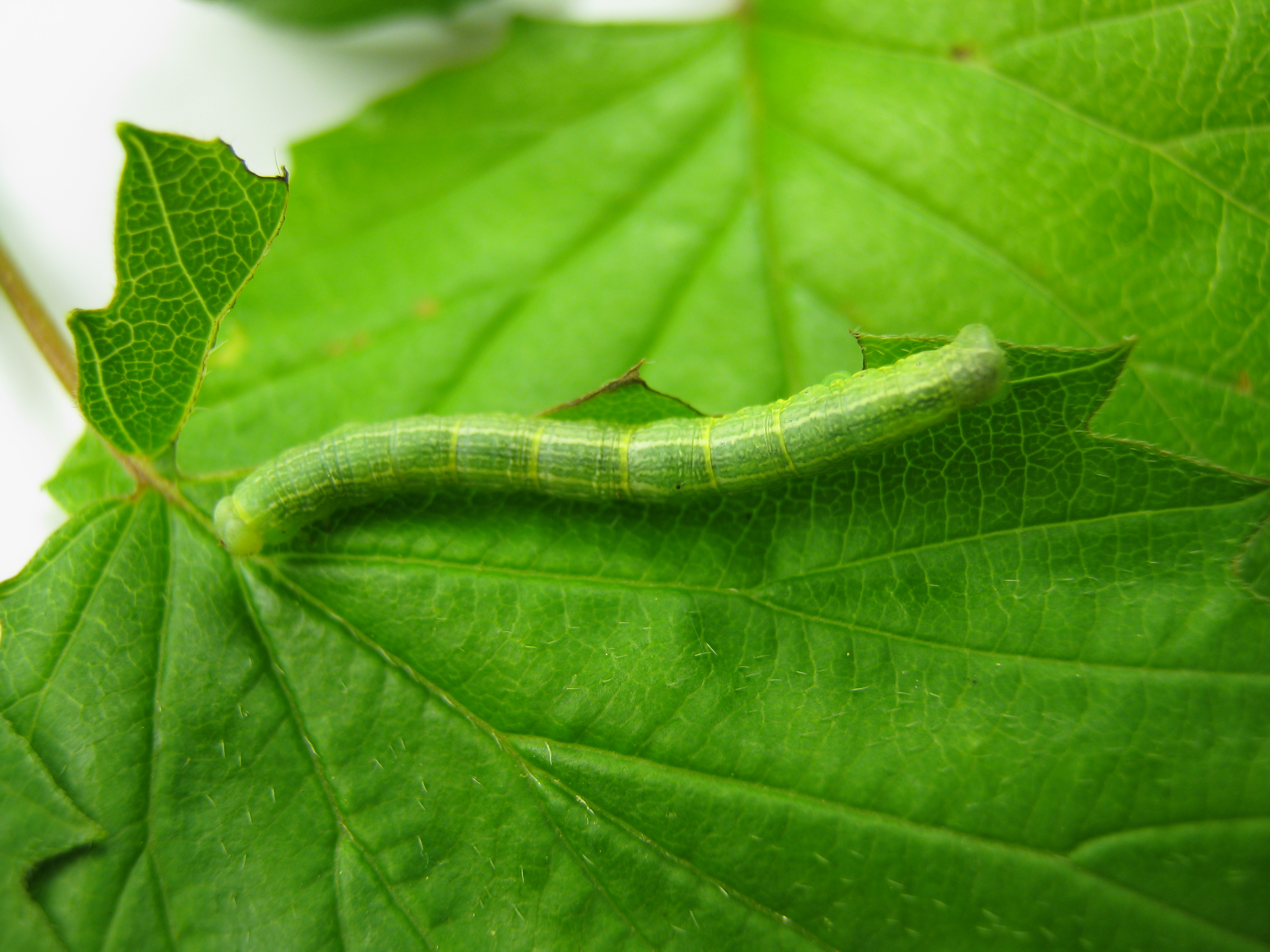
Caterpillar

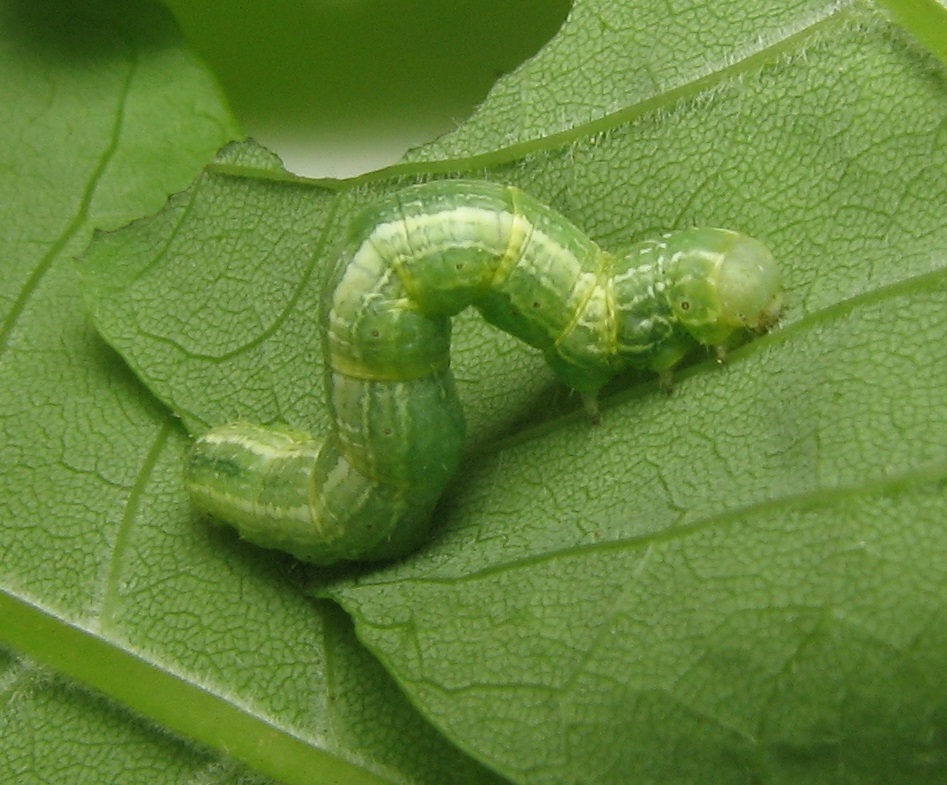
Caterpillar

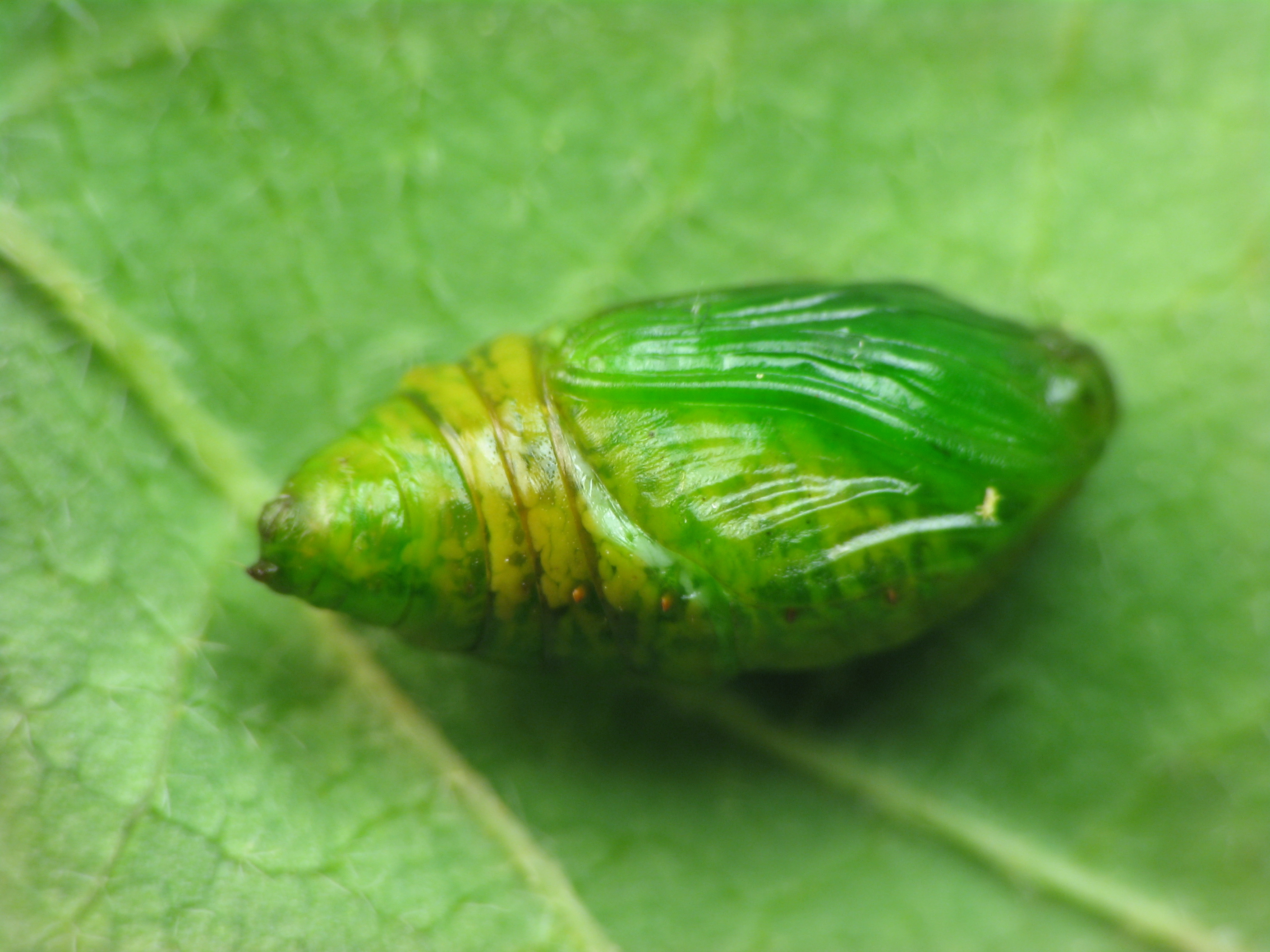
Pupa

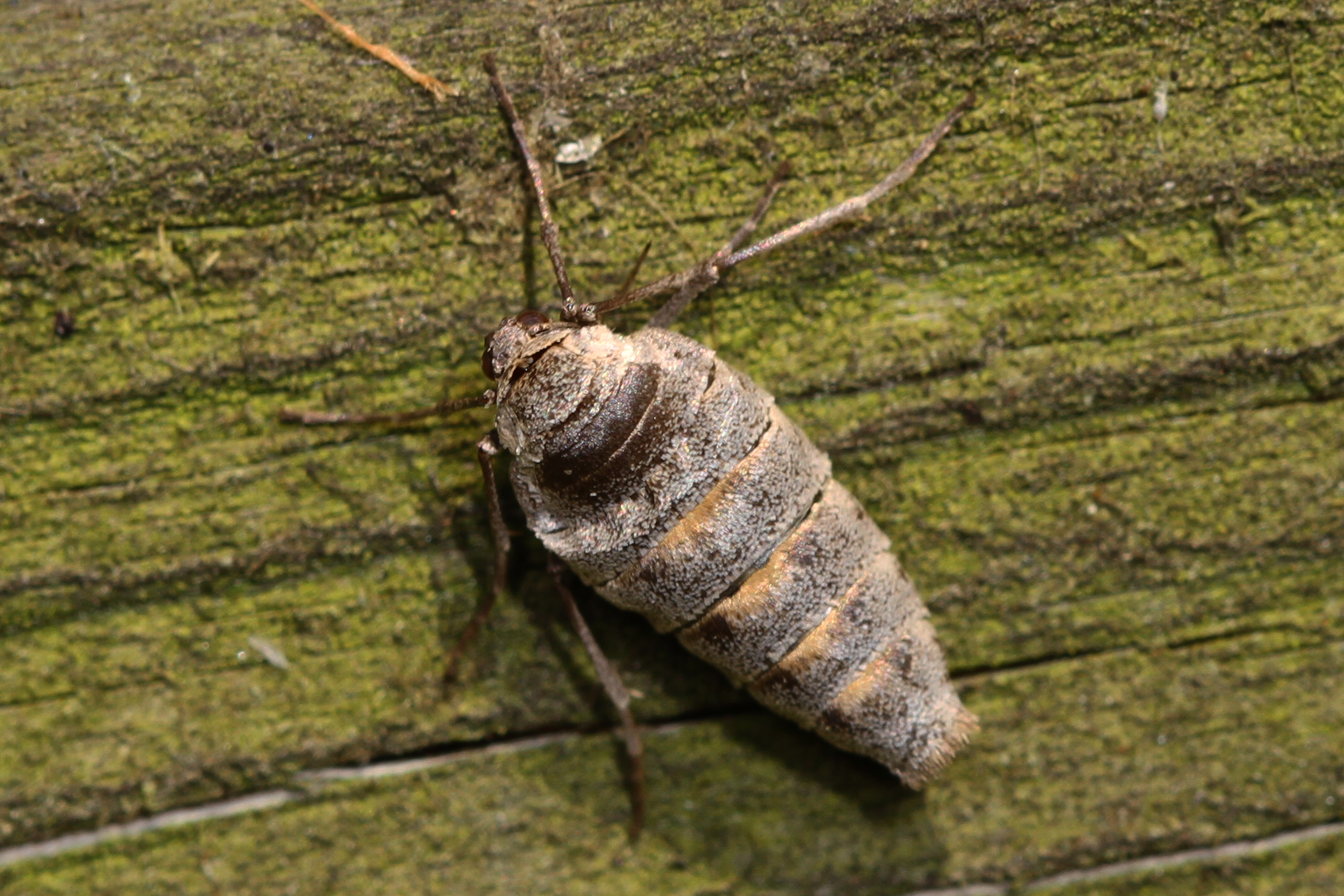
Wingless adult female

== Economic importance ==
The larvae, called loopers or inchworms, are considered a serious pest of many tree species because they can cause major defoliation in the new spring growth. If defoliation occurs two years in a row, the tree can die, especially if it has been stressed by drought.
