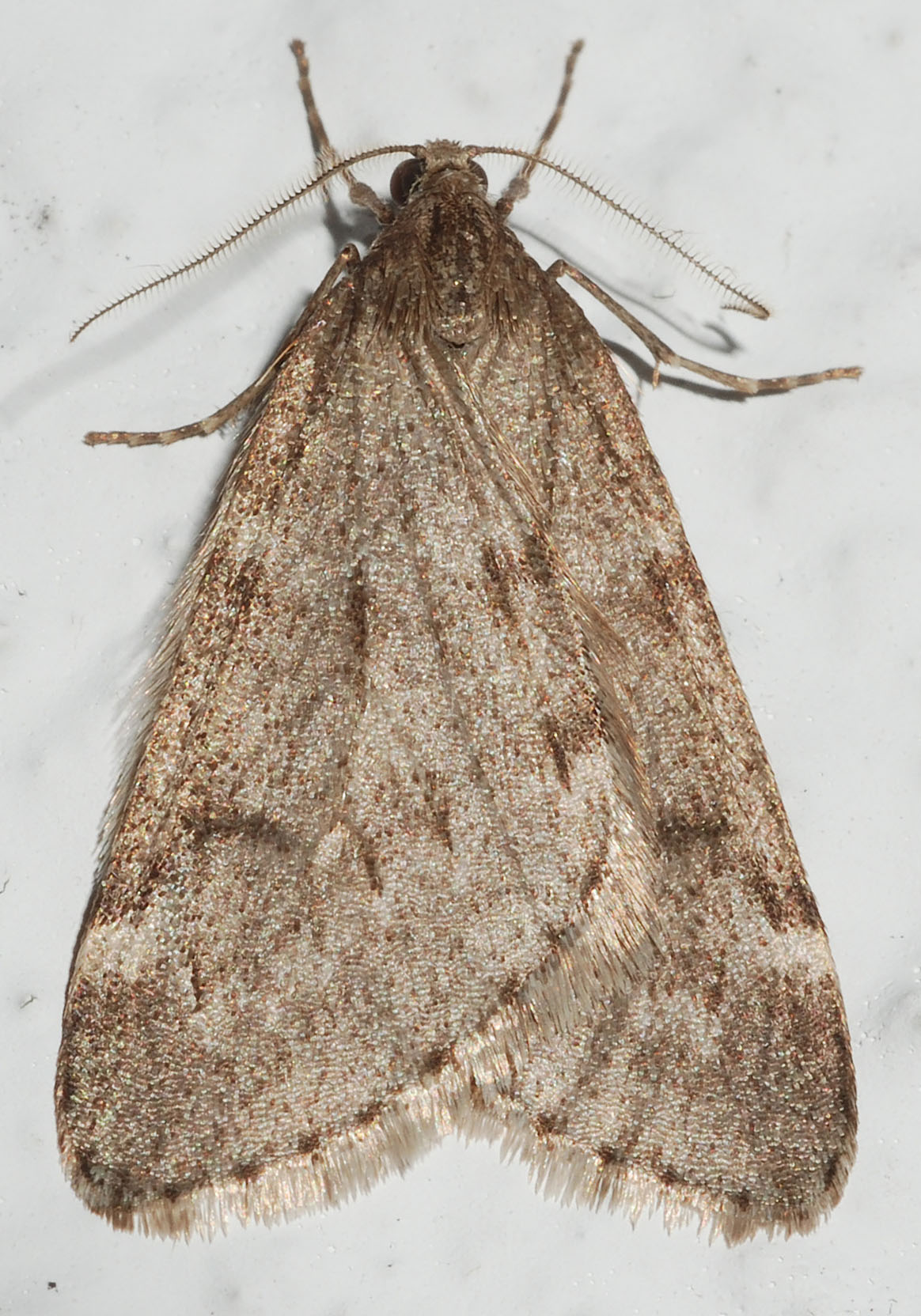
- Alsophila pometaria

Scientific classification
- Kingdom: Animalia
- Phylum: Arthropoda
- Clade: Pancrustacea
- Class: Insecta
- Order: Lepidoptera
- Family: Geometridae
- Subfamily: Alsophilinae
- Genus: Alsophila; Hübner, 1825

Synonyms
- Alsophiloides Inoue, 1961

= Alsophila (moth) =

Genus of geometer moths

Alsophila is a genus of the moth family Geometridae, subfamily Alsophilinae. The genus was erected by Jacob Hübner in 1825. The genus is notable because of distinct sexual dimorphism leading to strongly reduced wings in females, so much so that they cannot fly. The moths fly in late autumn or early spring.

== Species ==
List (after e.g.)

- Alsophila aceraria (Denis & Schiffermüller, 1775)
- Alsophila aescularia (Denis & Schiffermüller, 1775) – March moth
- Alsophila bulawski Beljaev, 1996
- Alsophila foedata Inoue, 1944
- Alsophila inouei Nakajima, 1989
- Alsophila japonensis Warren, 1894
- Alsophila murinaria Beljaev, 1996
- Alsophila pometaria Harris, 1841 – fall cankerworm
- Alsophila vladimiri Viidalepp, 1986
- Alsophila yanagitai Nakajima, 1995

For:
Alsophila acroama Inoue, [1944] see Alsophiloides acroama
Alsophila kurentzovi (Viidalepp, 1986) see Alsophiloides kurentzovi
Alsophila zabolne Inoue, 1941 see Chimaphila zabolne

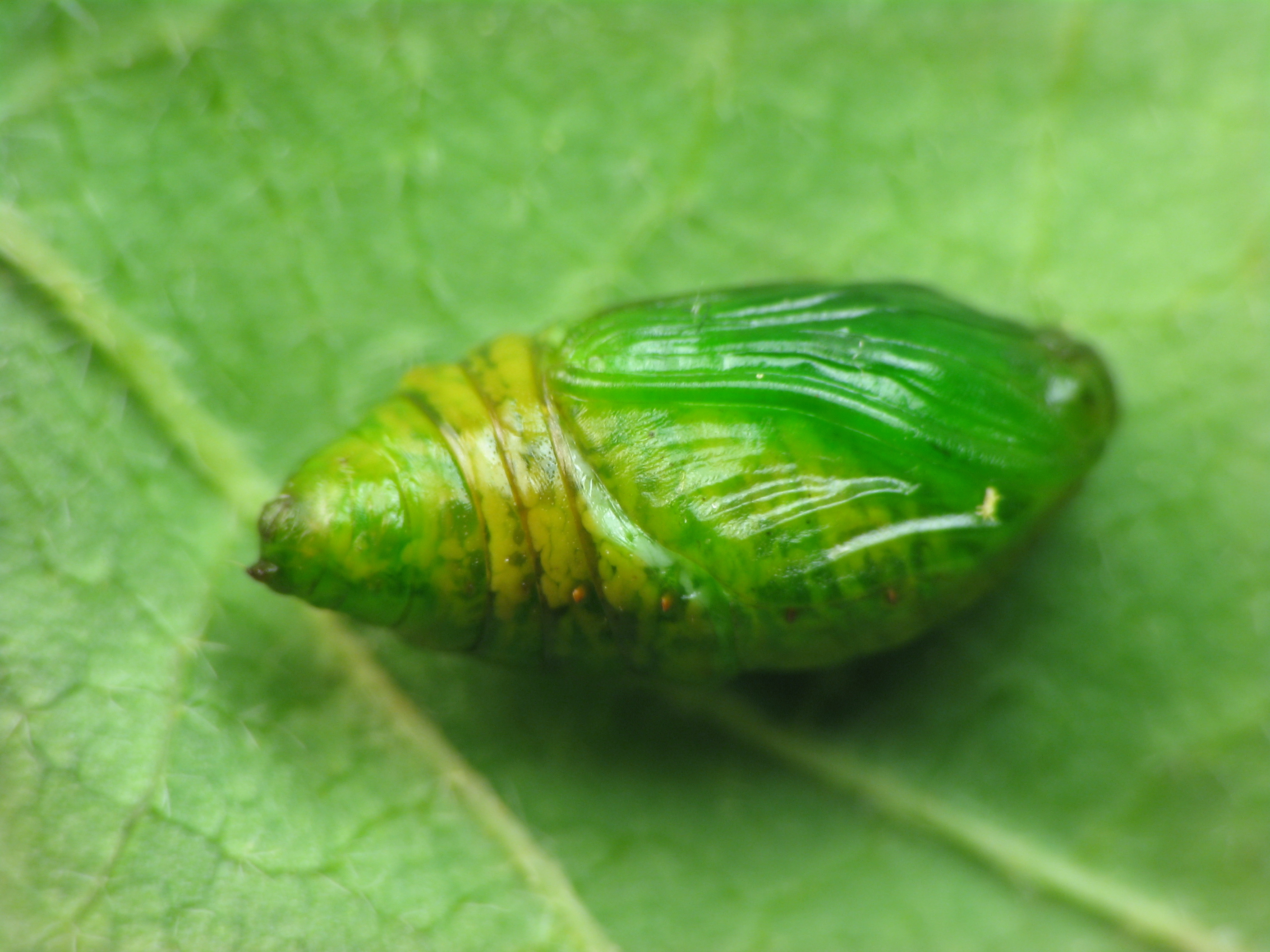
A. pometaria pupa
