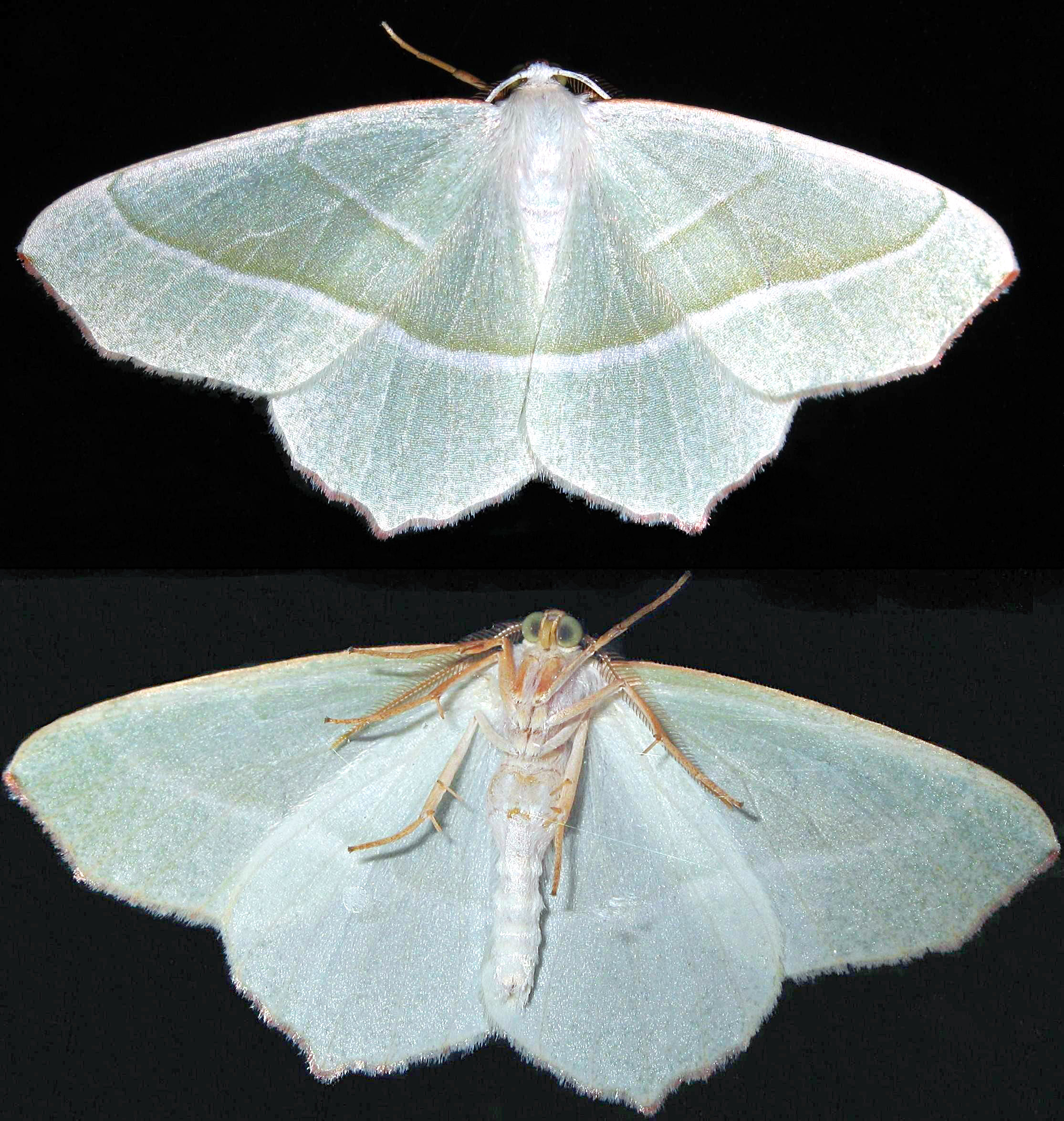

Scientific classification
- Kingdom: Animalia
- Phylum: Arthropoda
- Clade: Pancrustacea
- Class: Insecta
- Order: Lepidoptera
- Family: Geometridae
- Genus: Campaea
- Species: C. margaritata

Binomial name
- Campaea margaritata (Linnaeus, 1767)

= Campaea margaritata =

Light emerald

Species of moth

Campaea margaritata, commonly known as the light emerald, is a moth of the family Geometridae. The species was first described by Carl Linnaeus in his 1767 12th edition of Systema Naturae. It is widely distributed throughout Europe, the Near East and North Africa. The habitat is mixed forests including parks and large gardens.

== Description ==
Newly emerged adults have delicately pale green wings marked with green and white fascia, two on the slightly crenulate forewing, one on the hindwing. As with most moths of this colour, the green colouration is fugitive fading over time and older specimens tend to be almost pure white. The wingspan is 42–54 mm, the female generally being considerably larger than the male. The egg is smooth, long oval, but laid with the micropyle at the top; light grey, dark-dotted, later pink with the dots deep red. The larva is grey, brown or brownish-green, commonly with whitish dots, the segment-incisions well marked.

== Life cycle ==
One or two broods are produced each year and adults can be seen at any time between July and September. The larva feeds on a variety of deciduous trees, including apple, beech, birch, elm, hawthorn, hazel and oak as well as several species of Prunus. The species overwinters as a larva, feeding on the soft bark of its food plants during the winter.

This moth flies at night and is attracted to light.

1. The flight season refers to the British Isles. This may vary in other parts of the range.

== Gallery ==
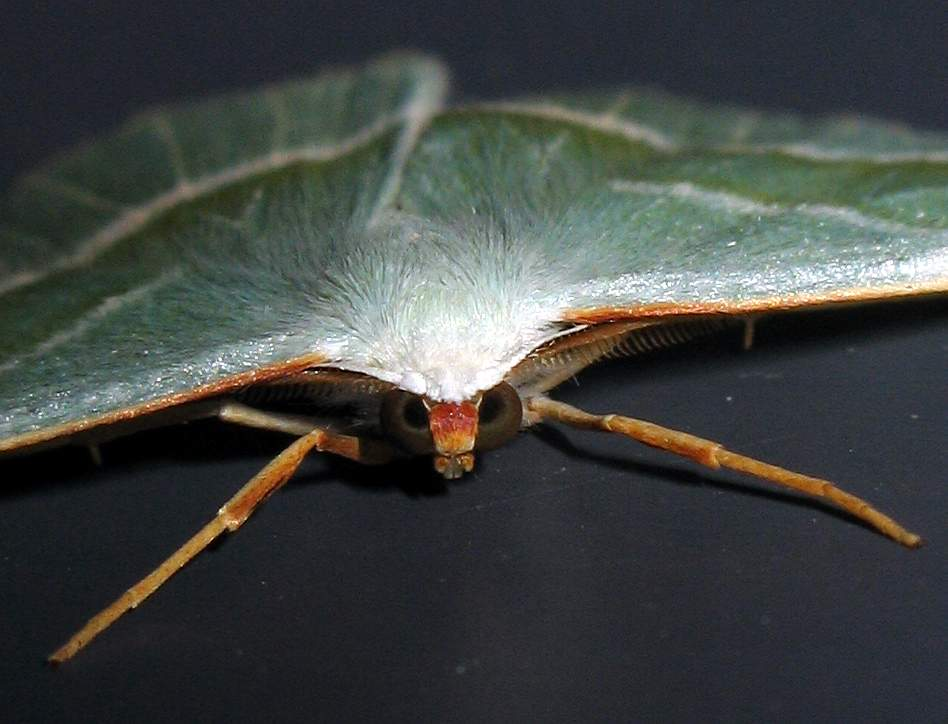
Close-up of head and forelegs

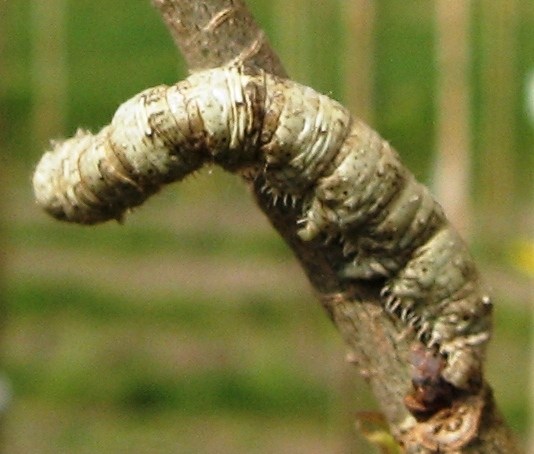
Larva on elm, Glimmen, Netherlands

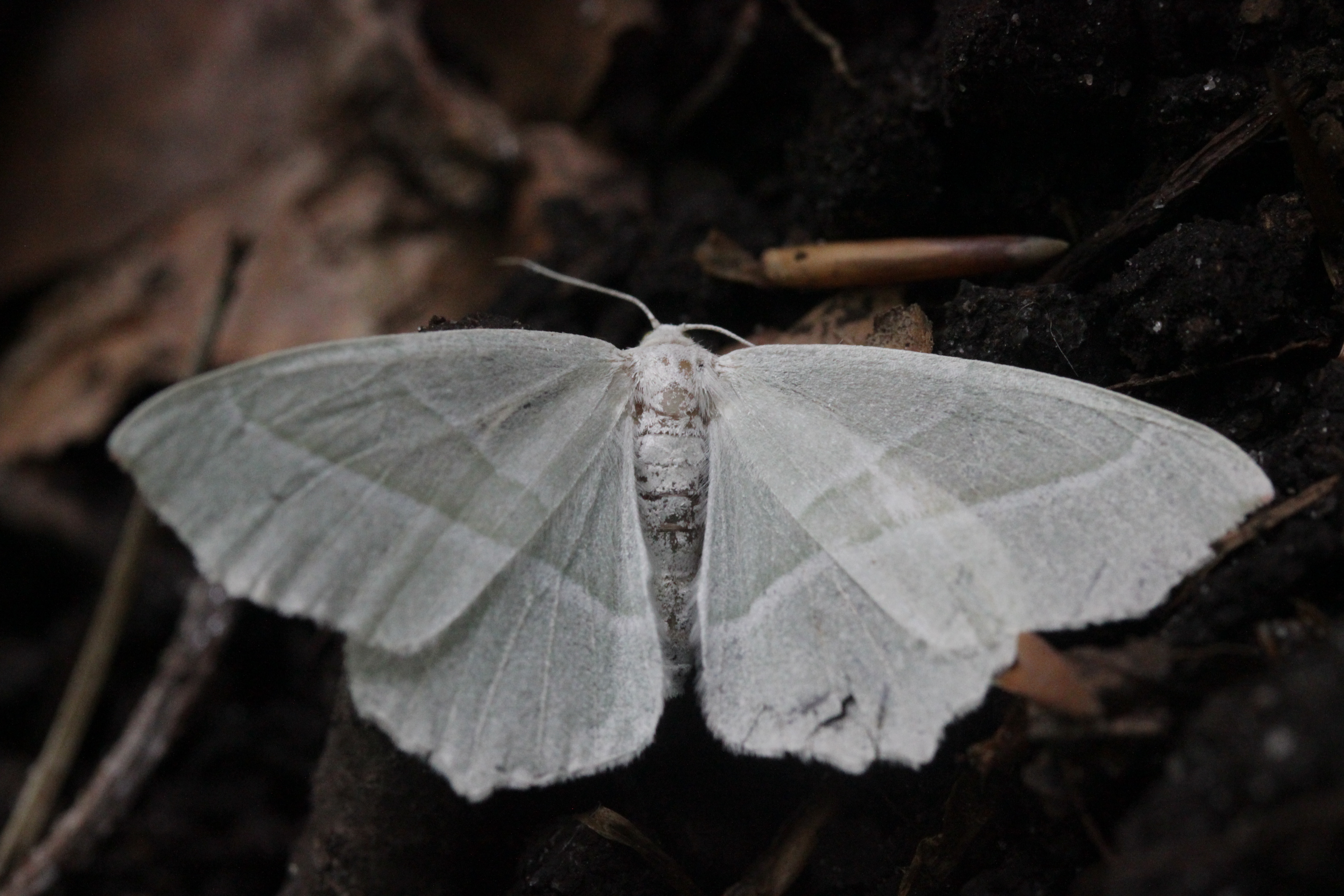

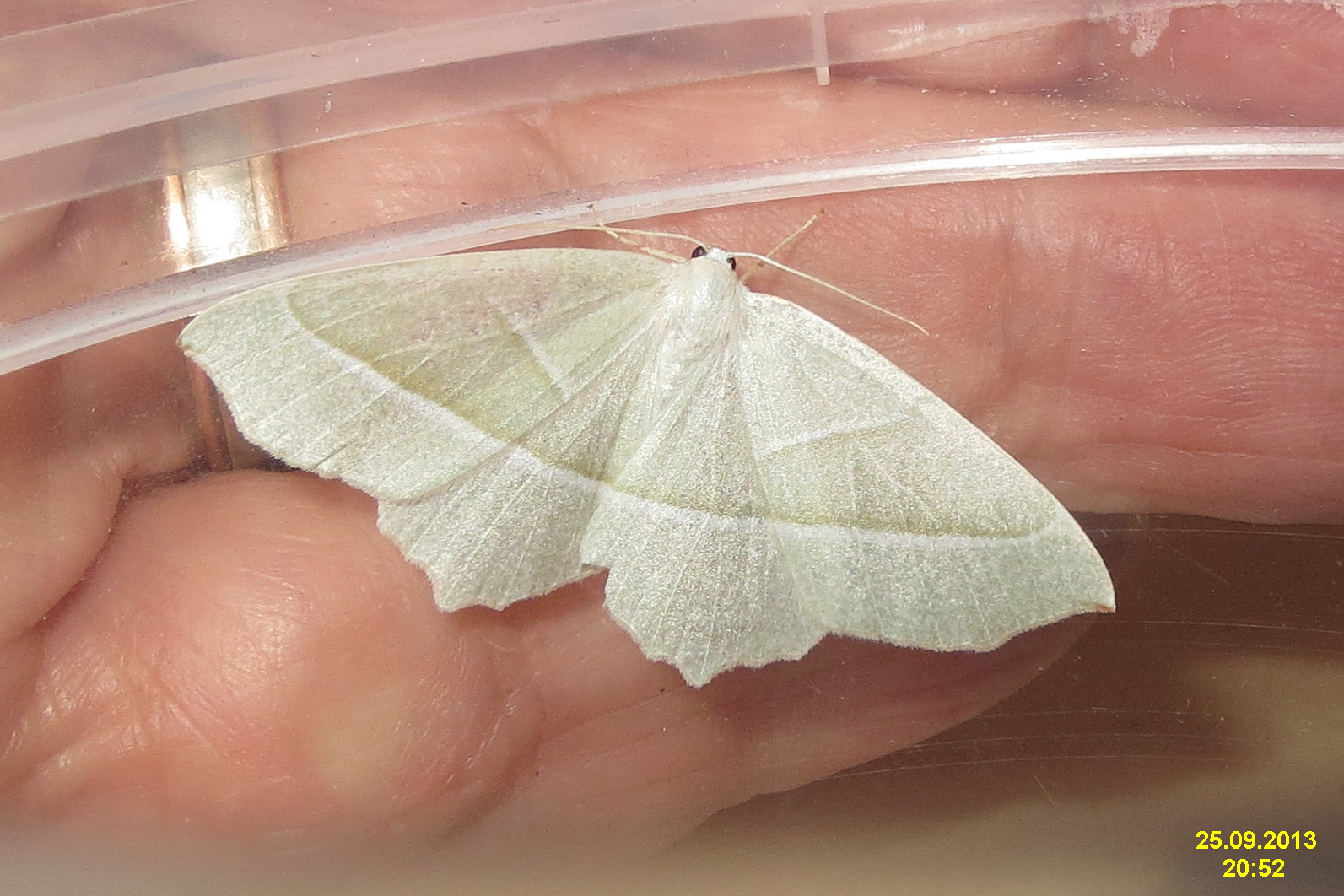

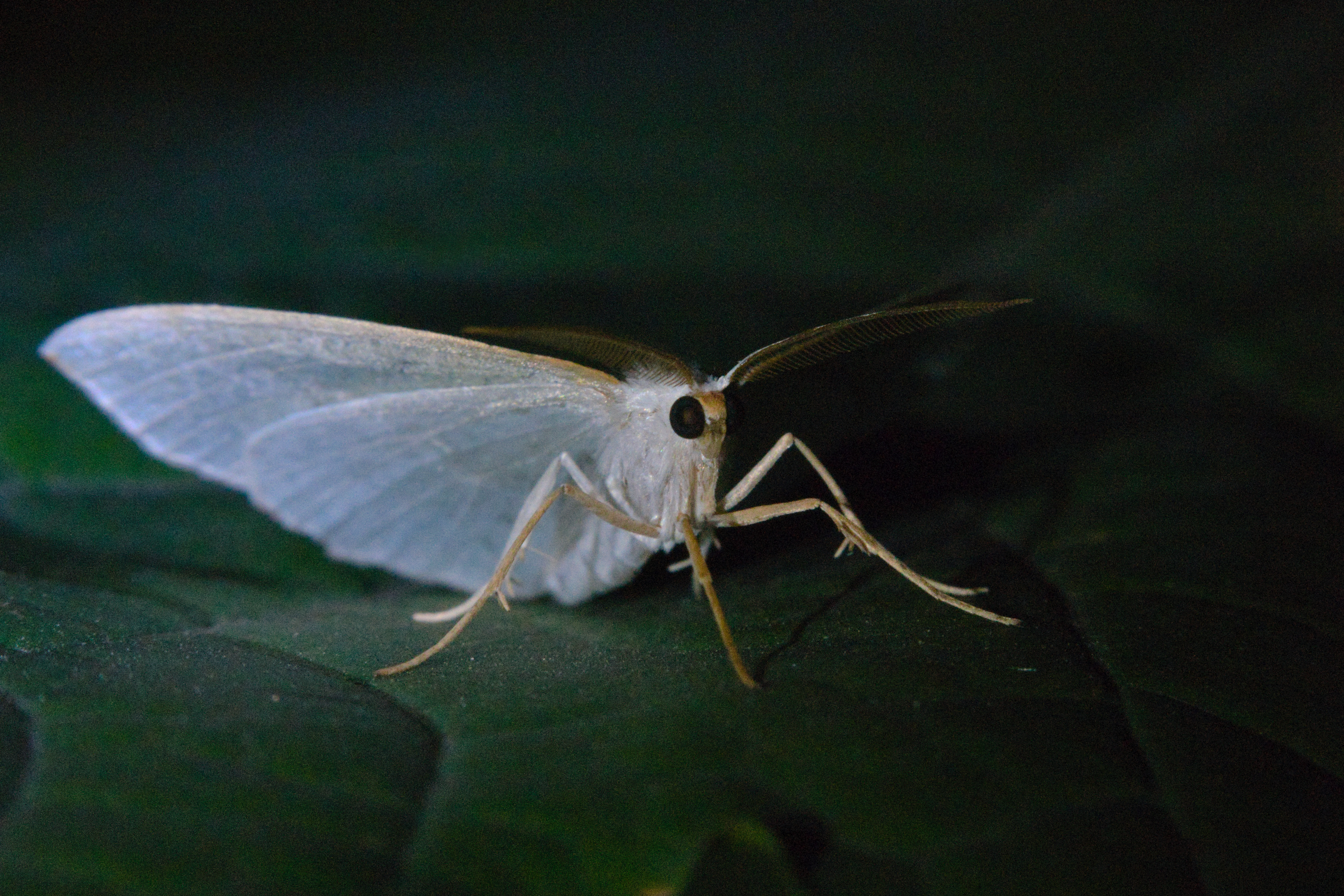

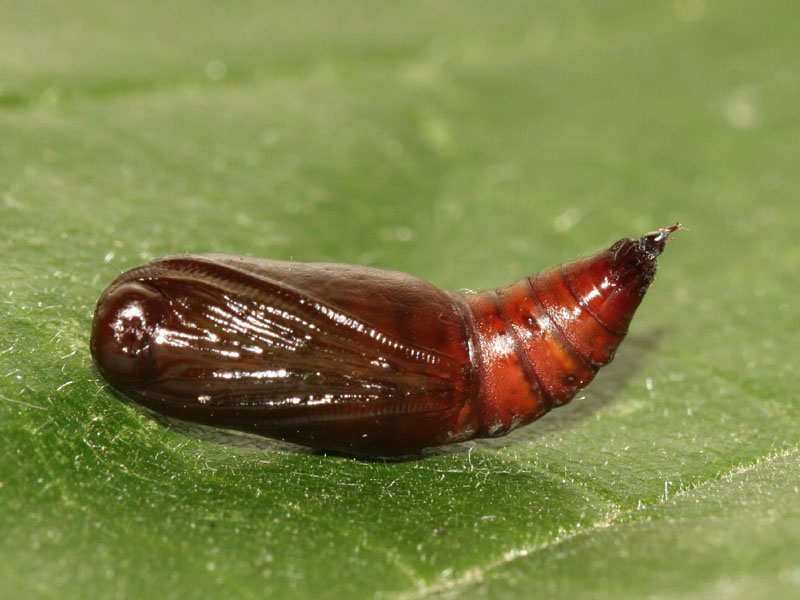

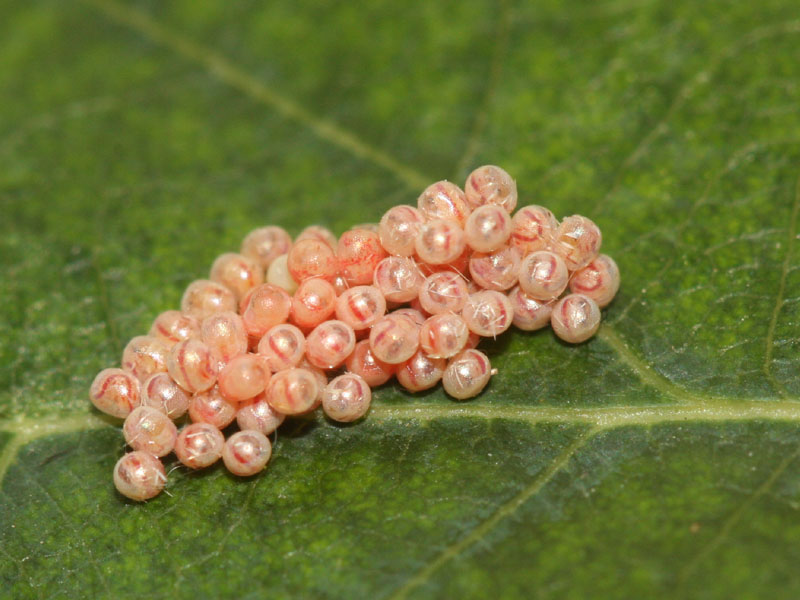
