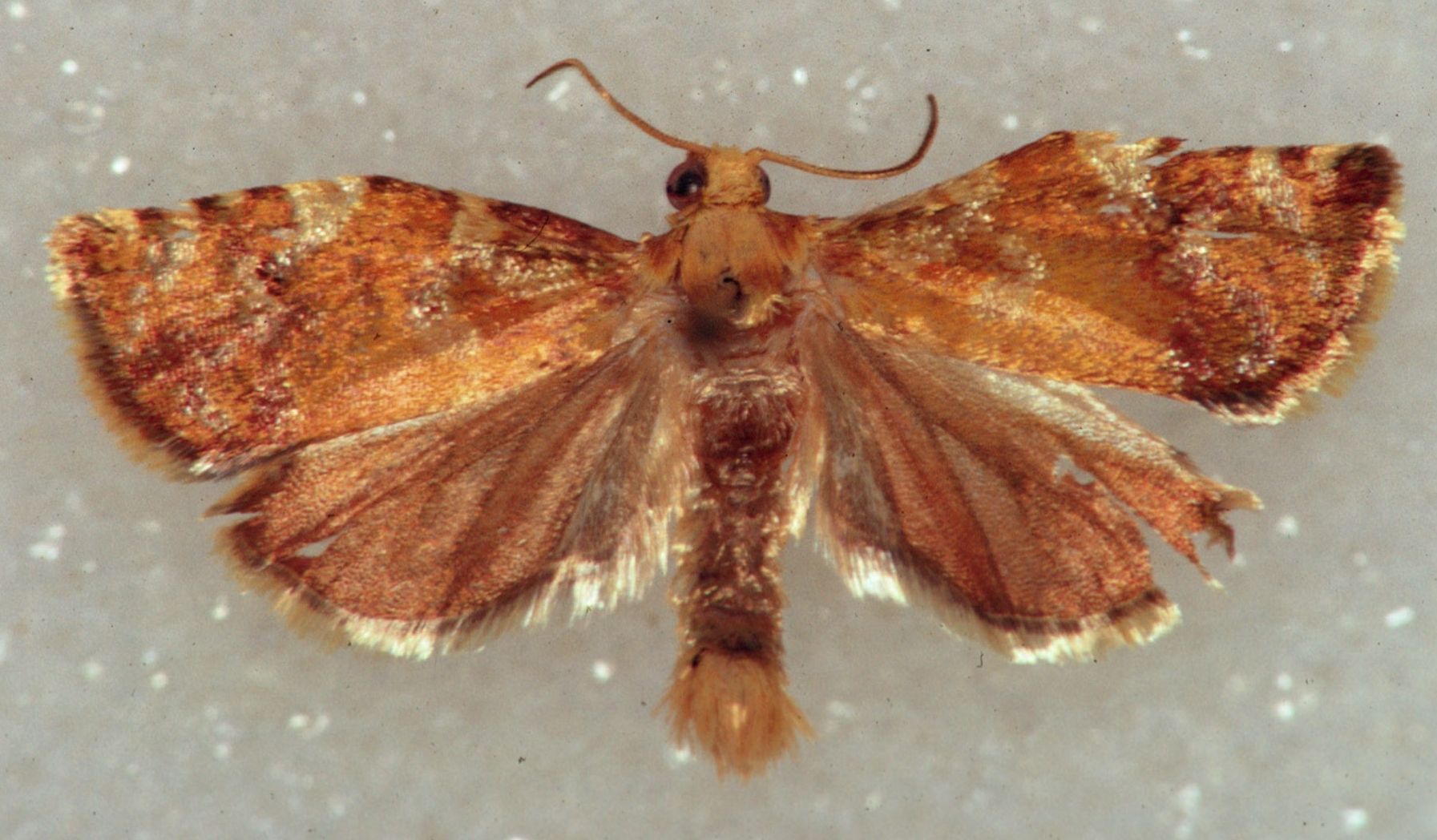

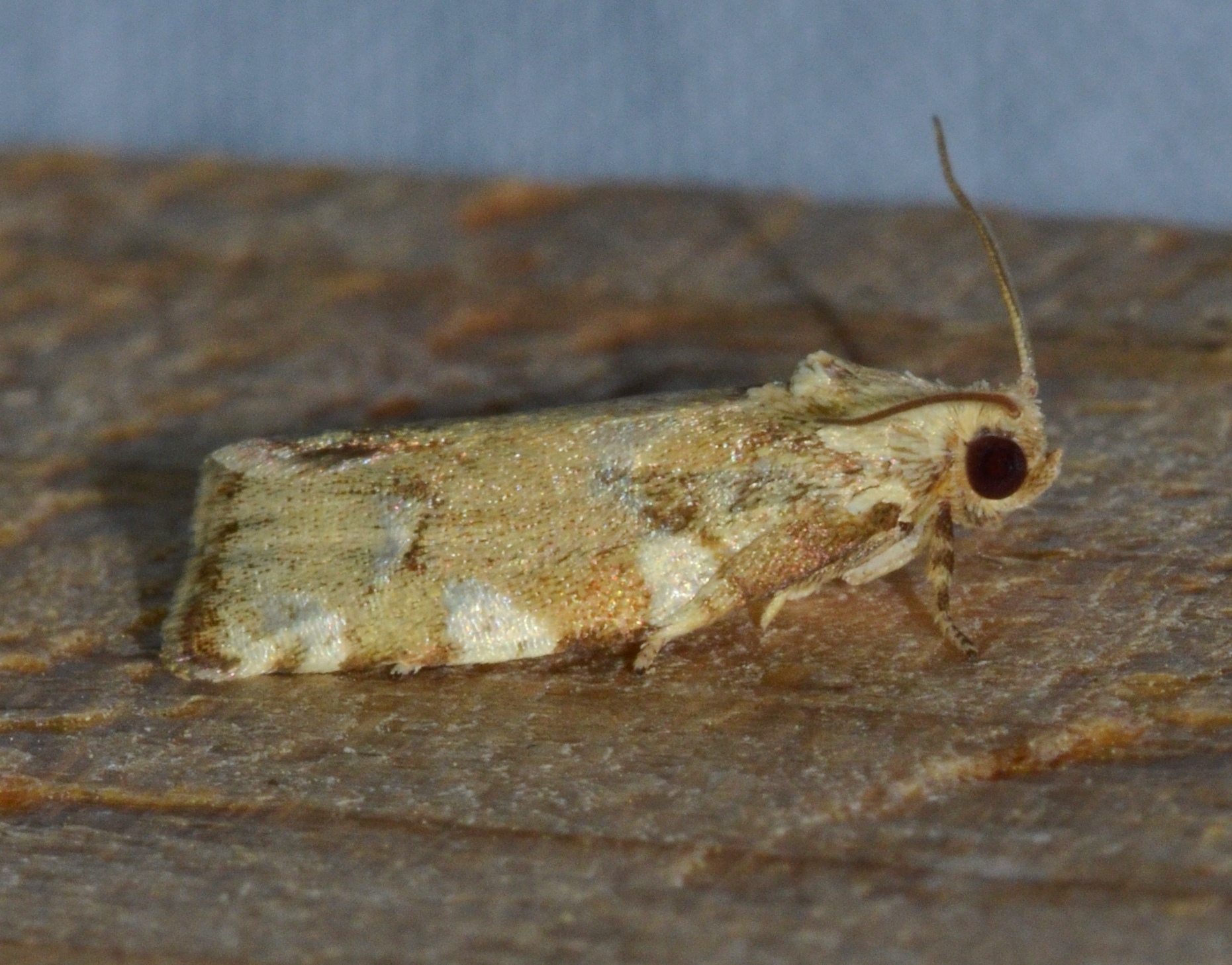

Scientific classification
- Kingdom: Animalia
- Phylum: Arthropoda
- Clade: Pancrustacea
- Class: Insecta
- Order: Lepidoptera
- Family: Tortricidae
- Genus: Archips
- Species: A. semiferanus

Binomial name
- Archips semiferanus (Walker, 1863)

Synonyms
- Lophoderus semiferanus Walker, 1863; Archips semiferana; Tortrix flaccidana Robinson, 1869

= Archips semiferanus =

Oak leafroller

Species of moth

Archips semiferanus (also known as Archips semiferana) is a species of moth in the family Tortricidae, and one of several species of moth commonly known as oak leafroller or oak leaf roller. The larvae feed on the leaves of oak trees in the eastern United States and southeastern Canada and are a major defoliator of oak trees, which can lead to tree mortality. In Pennsylvania in the late 1960s and early 1970s, oak leafrollers defoliated over 1,045,000 acres (423,000 ha).

Adult Archips semiferanus moths lay masses of 40 to 50 eggs on oak tree branches and rough bark in July; these overwinter and hatch the next spring. The larvae eat tree buds and young leaves, then roll leaves together with silk (hence the name). They nest and eat inside the rolled leaves, then pupate in the leaves or crevices in June. After a few weeks the adult moths emerge, mate and lay the next generation of eggs.

== Taxonomy ==
Archips semiferanus was first described by Francis Walker in 1863, and is sometimes referred to as Archips semiferana, or as Capua semiferana. Both synonyms are also attributed to Walker. The larvae roll oak leaves together with silk, which gives the insect its common name.

Over 15 species of moths are referred to with the common name oak leafroller, approximately three-fifths from the family Tortricidae, but also from four other families. According to the United States Forest Service, Archips semiferanus is the "most important oak leafroller" of these species; other common oak leafroller species such as Archips argyrosplilus and Choristoneura fractivittana are commonly found on oak trees, but do not cause the damage that A. semiferanus does.

== Description and life cycle ==
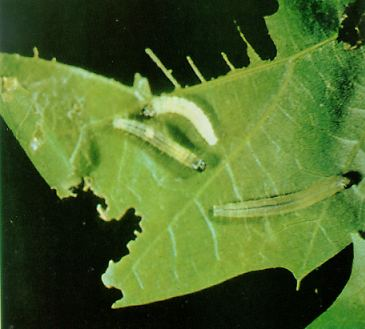
Oak leafroller larvae feeding on oak leaves

Oak leafroller moths lay their eggs in July each year, in groups of 40 to 50. The female covers the eggs with hairs from her body; they are deposited on "the base of large branches and rough bark patches on both tree trunks and limbs". The flat egg masses are white-gray in color and oval shaped, and are about 4.8 millimetres (0.19 in) across. The eggs overwinter and hatch in spring of the next year. The larvae (or caterpillars) emerge in April and initially eat the buds of oak trees and young leaves inside them.

When fully grown, the larvae are between 25 and 29 millimetres (0.98 and 1.14 in) long with a body that can be yellow-green or darker shades of green. Other identifying characteristics in the larvae include pale legs and a head that is either black or has "a dark eye patch or a dark bar". The larvae feed and nest inside leaves which they have rolled or folded until they are ready to pupate in mid-June. The larvae pupate in cocoons which are found inside the rolled leaves or in "bark crevices".

After a week or two in the pupal stage, the adult moths emerge in late June or early July. The moths are small with a wingspan of 18 to 22 millimetres (0.71 to 0.87 in); the wings have a characteristic bell shape. Wing color can vary considerably. Forewings are a mixture of "creamy brown and gray" with gray found at the wingtips. The forewings have a darker band of brown or gray crossing obliquely. The adults mate and lay eggs to start the next generation. The moths produce only one generation annually.

In Texas, the timing of the various stages of the life cycle starts earlier, and other differences in behavior are seen. Since spring comes earlier in Texas, the eggs are laid in May and hatch in mid-March of the next year. The larvae can be dislodged from trees and dangle beneath them from silk threads. Although the larvae can not harm humans, most people in Texas will avoid walking under oak trees to avoid them. The pupae of oak leafrollers in Texas are also found on branch tips and weeds near the tree.

== Distribution, habitat, and behavior ==
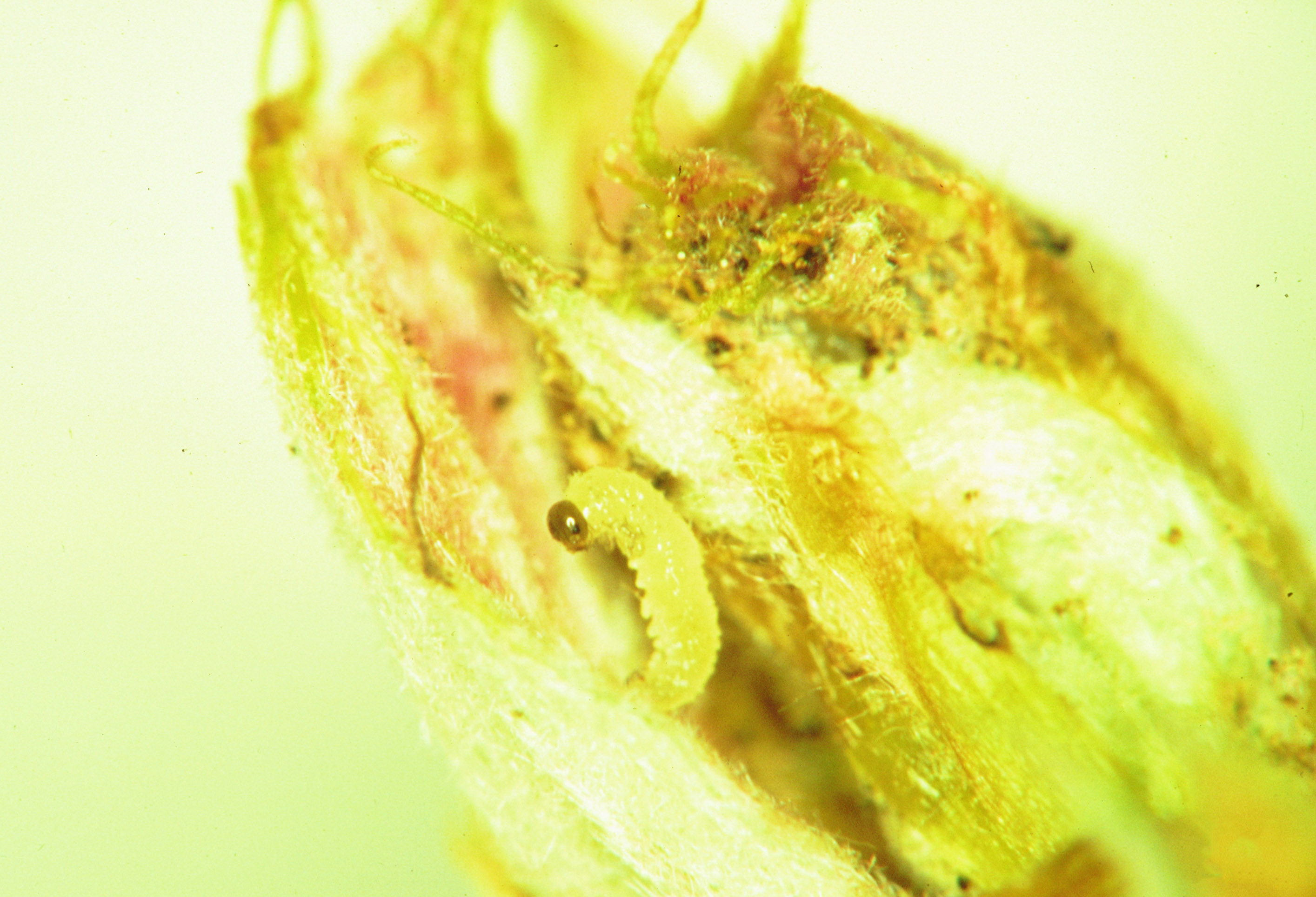
Young Archips semiferanus larvae eating developing leaves in an oak bud

Archips semiferanus is found in the eastern United States and adjoining portions of southeastern Canada. It has been found in US states including Connecticut, Massachusetts, New York, Pennsylvania, Texas, Virginia, and West Virginia. They may have been introduced to the United Kingdom. The oak leafrollers feed on all types of oak trees, but are especially prone to infestations in northern red oak, scarlet oak, and species found on mountain and ridge tops such as chestnut oak and white oak. In addition to oaks, Archips semiferanus have been known to feed on witchhazel and apple trees occasionally. In addition to the oak leafrollers, other pest species will often feed on the same oak trees, including Croesia semipurpurana and other oak leaftiers.

The young larvae eat the buds and either destroy developing leaves, or cause leaves to develop with many holes in them. This can severely stress the tree's food reserves, and the older larvae can eat nearly all the remaining leaves, defoliating them. When trees are defoliated two or more years in a row, "extensive tree mortality" can result. Dead wood in affected trees is attacked by fungi such as the shoestring root fungus and wood borers like the twolined chestnut borer.

Tiadaghton State Forest in north central Pennsylvania was especially hard hit. In Pennsylvania in the late 1960s and early 1970s, oak leafrollers defoliated over 1,045,000 acres (423,000 ha) and in 1975 the Bureau of Forestry reported "The value of oak timber lost from the outbreak has now exceeded $100,000,000." Hikers in the Quehanna Wild Area in northern Pennsylvania were warned to be careful with campfires as the large numbers of dead oak trees on the Allegheny Plateau from oak leafroller were a fire hazard. In 2001 recent outbreaks had occurred in Cambria, Cameron, Clearfield, Clinton, and Warren counties in Pennsylvania.

Until it was banned in the United States in 1972, the pesticide DDT was used to control outbreaks. In 1974 the United States Forest Service tested four insecticides on oak leafroller larvae as replacements for DDT and found that less than 1 microgram of each (bioethanomethrin, mexacarbate, phoxim, and pyrethrins) caused 90 percent mortality. Natural predators that feed on the larvae include parasitic wasps and bird species such as mockingbirds. The sex pheromones of the species have been studied as well.
