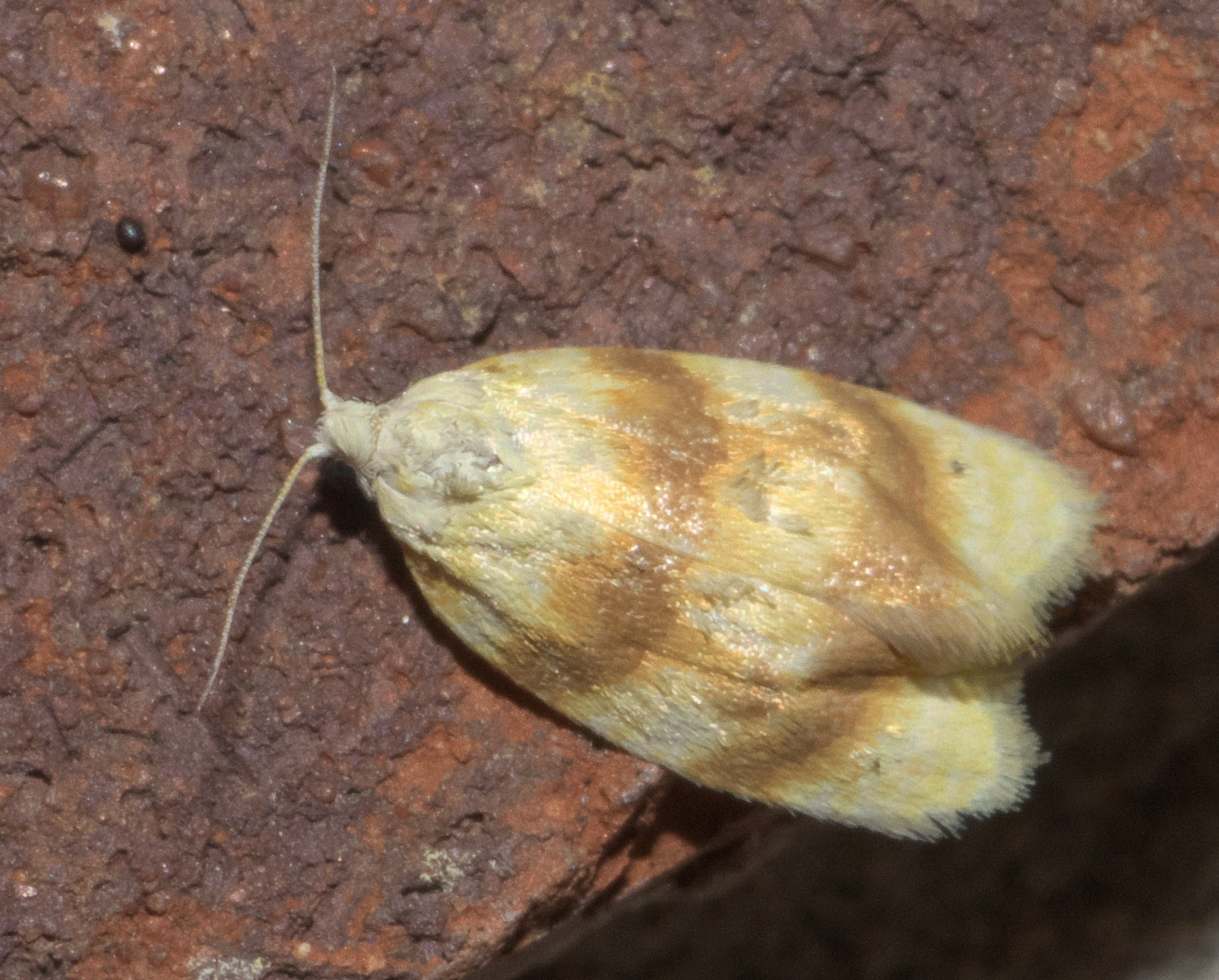

Scientific classification
- Kingdom: Animalia
- Phylum: Arthropoda
- Clade: Pancrustacea
- Class: Insecta
- Order: Lepidoptera
- Family: Tortricidae
- Genus: Acleris
- Species: A. semipurpurana

Binomial name
- Acleris semipurpurana (Kearfott, 1909)

Synonyms
- Tortrix albicomana var. semipurpurana Kearfott 1905; Tortrix semipurpurana; Argyrotoxa semipurpurana; Croesia semipurpurana; Tortrix dorsipurpurana Kearfott, 1907

= Acleris semipurpurana =

Oak leaftier moth

Species of moth

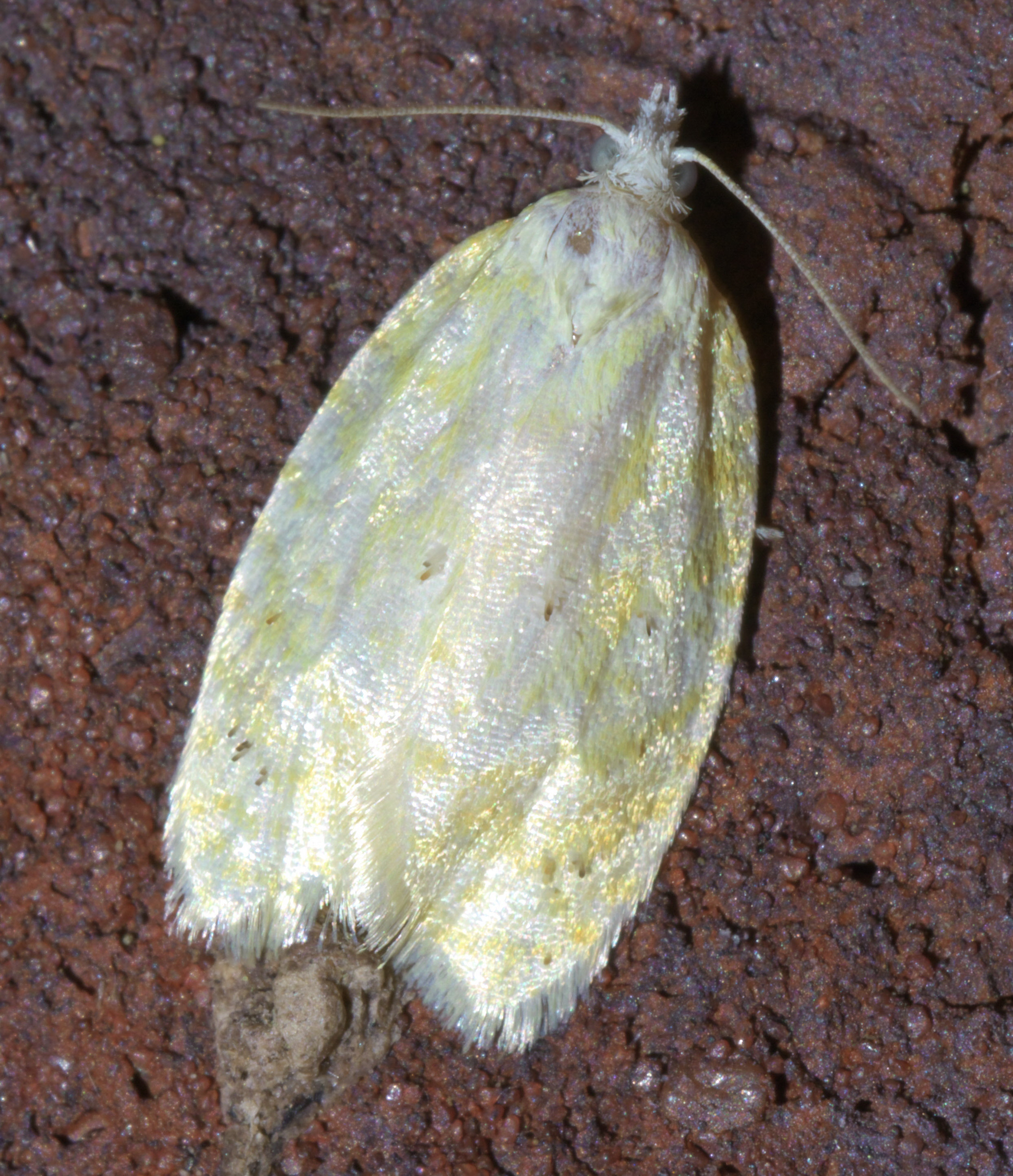
Acleris semipurpurana, oak leaftier moth, size: 8.5 mm

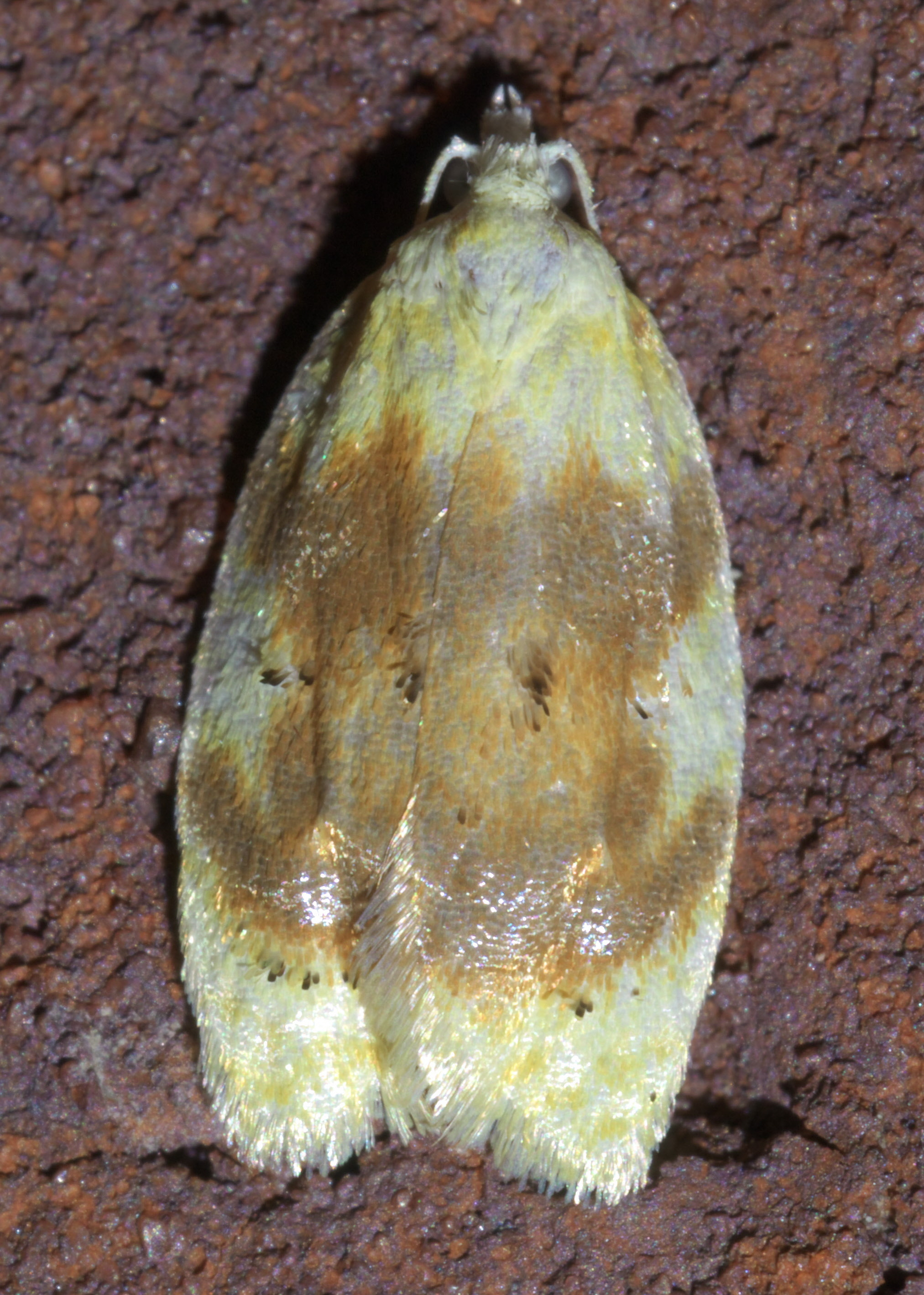
Acleris semipurpurana, oak leaftier moth, size: 8.7 mm

Acleris semipurpurana is a species in the moth family Tortricidae, and one of several species of moth commonly known as oak leaftier or oak leaf tier. The larvae feed on the leaves of oak trees in the Eastern United States and southeastern Canada which can be a major cause of defoliation. The loss of leaves can kill or damage the affected trees, which are chiefly in the Lobatae or red oak section of Quercus, or oaks.

Adult Acleris semipurpurana moths lay single eggs on oak tree branches in June which develop over winter and hatch the next April. The larvae eat tree buds and young leaves, then tie leaves together with silk (hence the name). They nest and eat inside the tied leaves, then pupate in the leaf litter on the floor in May or June. After a week or two the adult moths emerge, mate, and lay the next generation of eggs.

== Life cycle and description ==
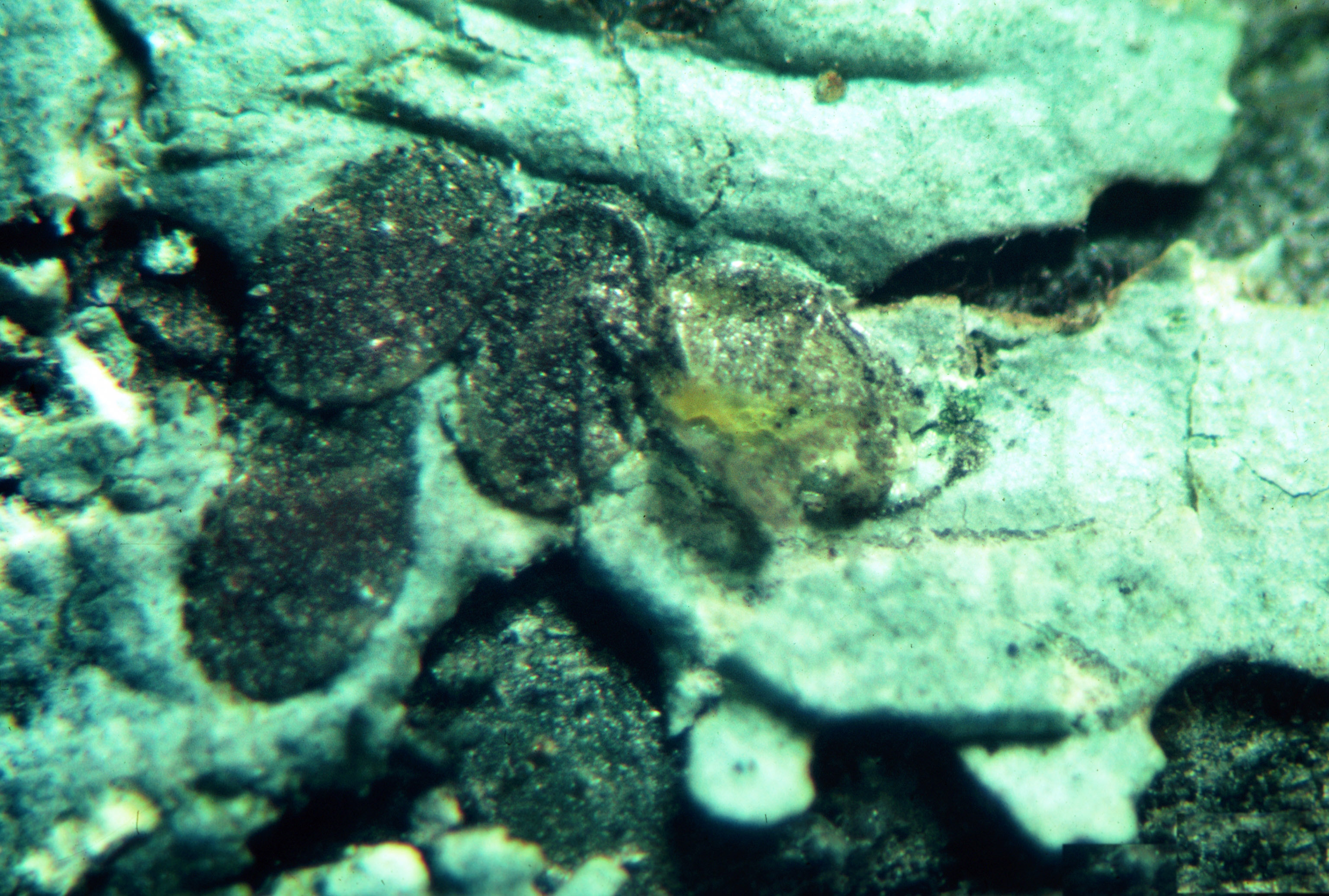
Eggs are laid on twigs in June and hatch the following April

Oak leaftier moths lay their eggs in June each year, typically as single eggs on rough-bark twigs, typically "second year branches". The eggs overwinter, then hatch in the following spring. After larvae (or caterpillars) emerge in April, they eat the buds of oak trees and the young leaves inside them. When they are fully grown, the larvae are 12 millimetres (0.47 in) long and "dirty white to light green" with "a pale brown head and black to brown front legs". Other identifying characteristics of the larvae are a long head with a black bar on the cheek or lower portion, and brown legs on the thorax. The larvae tie leaves together with silk, which gives the insect its common name. The larvae feed and nest inside the tied or folded leaves until mid- to late May, when they begin to pupate.

The larvae leave the trees to pupate, descending to the ground on silken threads. The pupae are commonly found in leaf litter on the forest floor beneath the oak trees. In late May or June, after one or two weeks in the pupal stage, adult moths emerge. The moths are small with a wingspan of 12 millimetres (0.47 in); their wings have a characteristic bell shape. Wing colors can vary considerably. Some forewings are yellow while others have dark brown or even purple markings. The adults mate and lay eggs – only one generation of moths is produced annually. Acleris semipurpurana was first described by William D. Kearfott in 1909.

== Range and impact ==
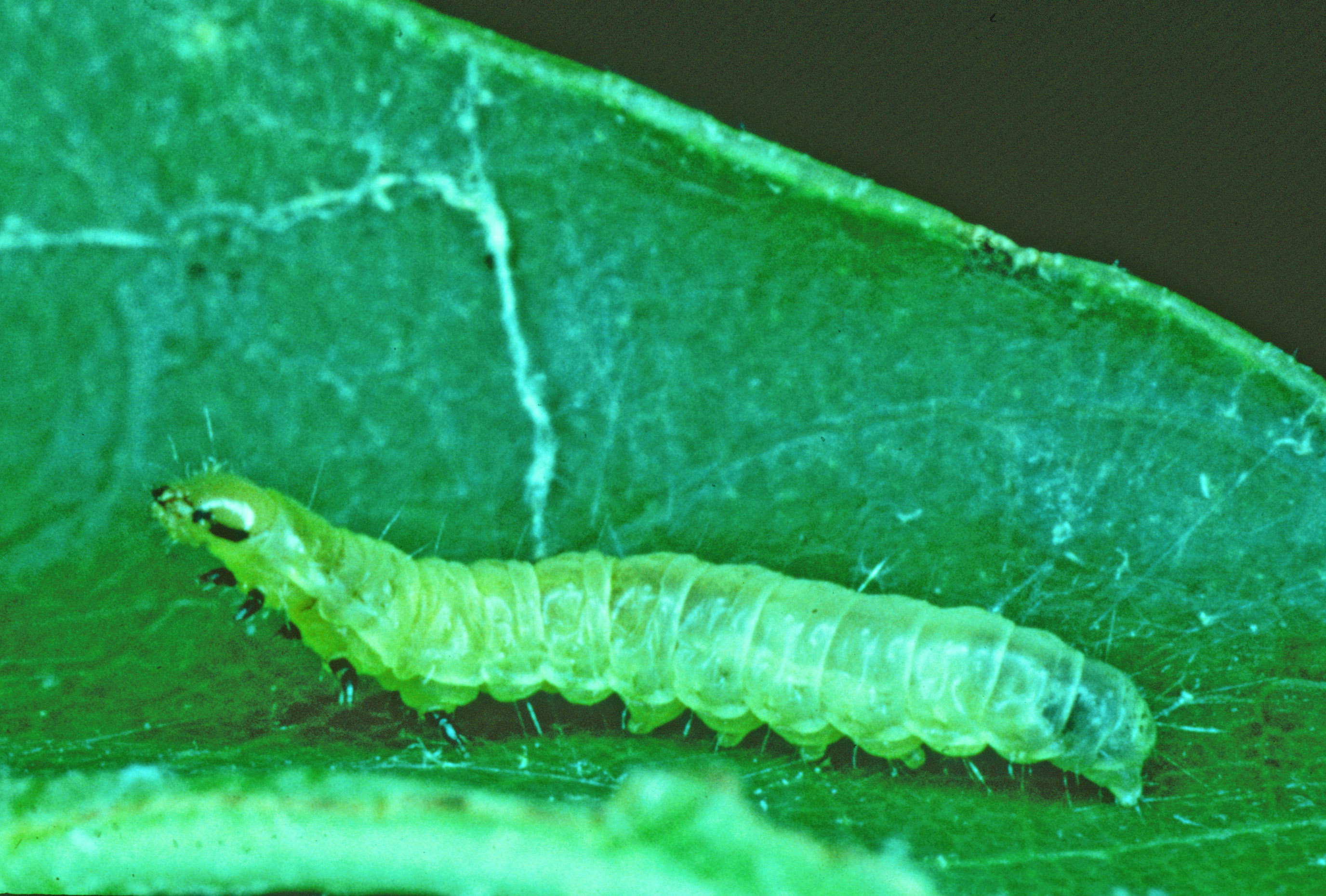
A larva (or caterpillar) eating an oak leaf

Acleris semipurpurana is found in the eastern United States and adjoining portions of southeastern Canada. It has been found in US states ranging from New York, Massachusetts, Connecticut and Pennsylvania in the northeast to Minnesota and Texas in the west, as well as the Canadian province of Ontario. The oak leaftiers feed mainly trees in the Lobatae or red oak section of Quercus or oak trees: Specifically on eastern black oak, northern red oak, pin oak, scarlet oak, and scrub oak. Several species of moths are referred to with the common name oak leaftier, most from the family Tortricidae, but also from "three other minor families". Of these species Acleris semipurpurana is the most common and one of the most important for defoliation. In addition to the oak leaftiers, other pest species will often feed on the same trees, including Archips semiferanus and other oak leafrollers.

The young larvae eat the buds and either destroy developing leaves, or cause leaves to develop with many holes in them. This can severely stress the tree's food reserves, and the older larvae can eat nearly all the remaining leaves, defoliating them. When trees are defoliated two or more years in a row, this leads to "branch dieback, loss of diameter growth, and tree decline". The oak leaftier has caused "considerable tree mortality", especially in the Appalachian region. Dead wood in affected trees is attacked by fungi such as the shoestring root fungus and wood borers like the twolined chestnut borer. A major outbreak occurred in the 1960s and 1970s in Connecticut, Massachusetts, New York, Pennsylvania, Virginia, and West Virginia. Tiadaghton State Forest in north central Pennsylvania was especially hard hit. Natural methods of pest control usually are sufficient to keep Croesia semipurpurana populations in check, but chemical pesticides are sometimes needed.
