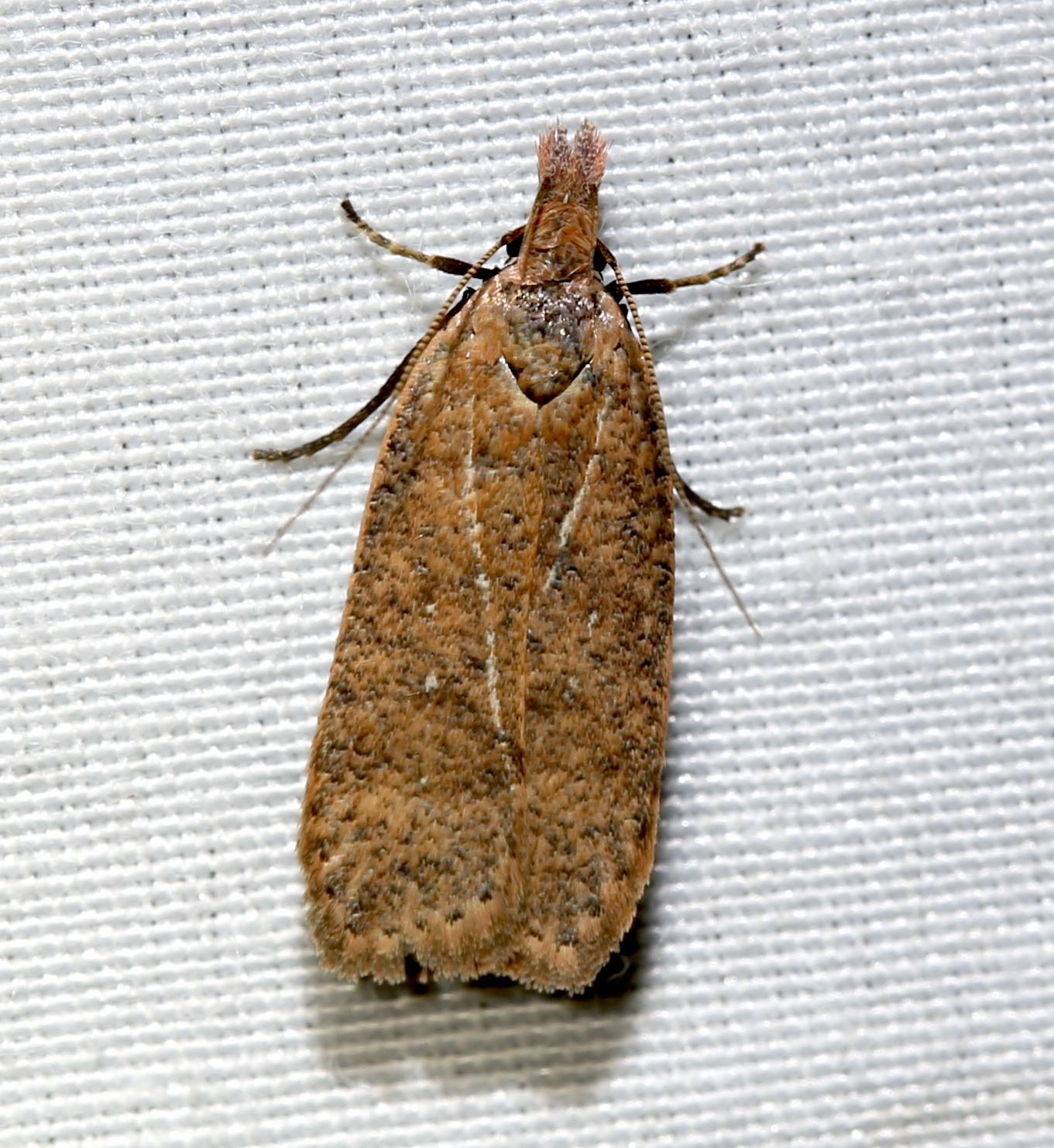

Scientific classification
- Kingdom: Animalia
- Phylum: Arthropoda
- Class: Insecta
- Order: Lepidoptera
- Family: Gelechiidae
- Genus: Dichomeris
- Species: D. georgiella

Binomial name
- Dichomeris georgiella (Walker, 1866)

Synonyms
- Depressaria georgiella Walker, 1866; Ypsolophus caryaefoliella Chambers, 1872; Nothris bimaculella Chambers, 1877; Dichomeris mollis Barnes & Busck, 1920

= Dichomeris georgiella =

Species of moth

Dichomeris georgiella is a moth in the family Gelechiidae. It was described by Francis Walker in 1866. It is found in North America, where it has been recorded from south-eastern Canada and Maine, south to Florida, west to Texas, Oklahoma and Illinois. It has also been recorded from Colorado and Arizona.

The wingspan is 19–21 mm. The forewings are light ochreous fuscous sprinkled with black, the costal edge narrowly and faintly touched with brick red. There is a small inconspicuous second white discal spot at the end of the cell, edged with black and a similar even less conspicuous dot, consisting of a few scales on the middle of the cell. There is also a very faint row of black dots on the terminal edge, which is slightly darker than the rest of the wing. The hindwings are light fuscous. Adults are on wing from March to October.

The larvae feed on Quercus coccinea and Quercus rubra.
