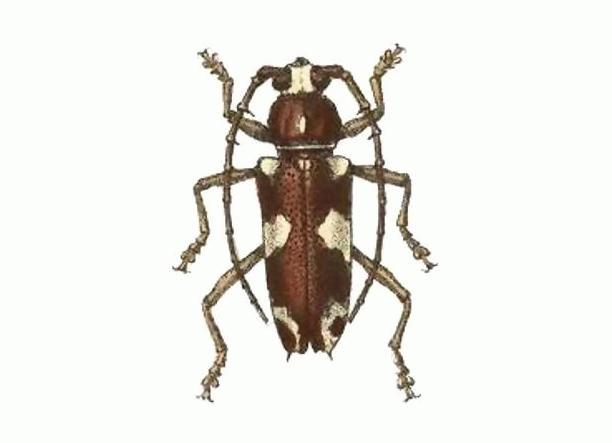

Scientific classification
- Domain: Eukaryota
- Kingdom: Animalia
- Phylum: Arthropoda
- Class: Insecta
- Order: Coleoptera
- Suborder: Polyphaga
- Infraorder: Cucujiformia
- Family: Cerambycidae
- Genus: Enaphalodes
- Species: E. coronatus

Binomial name
- Enaphalodes coronatus (White, 1853)

= Enaphalodes coronatus =

Species of beetle

Enaphalodes coronatus is a species of beetle in the family Cerambycidae. It was described by White in 1853.
