= Enaphalodes taeniatus =

Scientific classification
- Domain: Eukaryota
- Kingdom: Animalia
- Phylum: Arthropoda
- Class: Insecta
- Order: Coleoptera
- Suborder: Polyphaga
- Infraorder: Cucujiformia
- Family: Cerambycidae
- Genus: Enaphalodes
- Species: E. taeniatus

Binomial name
- Enaphalodes taeniatus (LeConte, 1854)

Species of beetle

Enaphalodes taeniatus is a species of beetle in the family Cerambycidae. It was described by John Lawrence LeConte in 1854.
