= Enaphalodes archboldi =

Scientific classification
- Domain: Eukaryota
- Kingdom: Animalia
- Phylum: Arthropoda
- Class: Insecta
- Order: Coleoptera
- Suborder: Polyphaga
- Infraorder: Cucujiformia
- Family: Cerambycidae
- Genus: Enaphalodes
- Species: E. archboldi

Binomial name
- Enaphalodes archboldi Lingafelter & Chemsak, 2002

Species of beetle

Enaphalodes archboldi is a species of beetle in the family Cerambycidae. It was described by Lingafelter and Chemsak in 2002.
