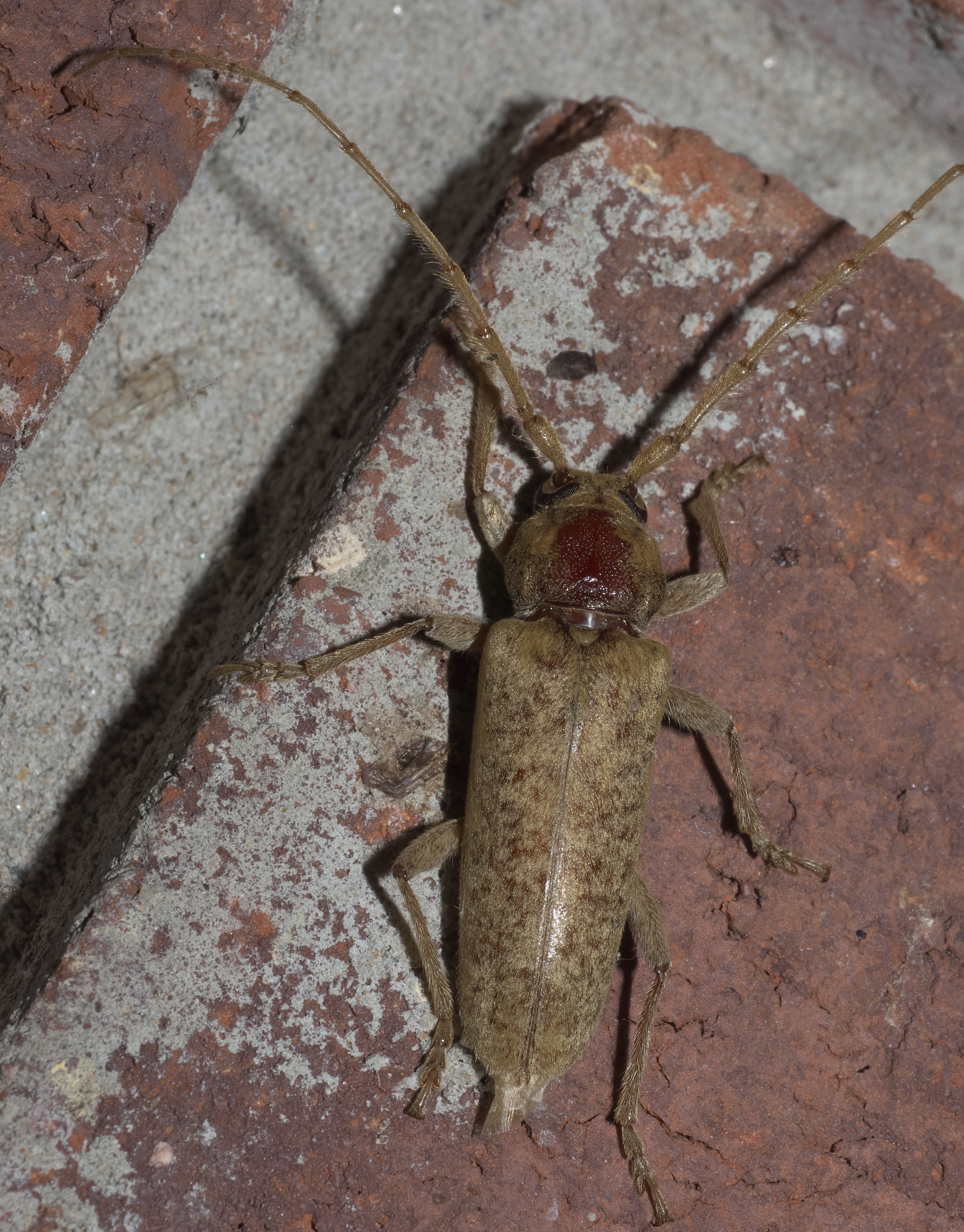

Scientific classification
- Kingdom: Animalia
- Phylum: Arthropoda
- Clade: Pancrustacea
- Class: Insecta
- Order: Coleoptera
- Suborder: Polyphaga
- Infraorder: Cucujiformia
- Family: Cerambycidae
- Genus: Enaphalodes
- Species: E. rufulus

Binomial name
- Enaphalodes rufulus (Haldeman, 1847)

= Enaphalodes rufulus =

Species of beetle

Enaphalodes rufulus or Red Oak Borer is a species of beetle in the family Cerambycidae. Native to North America, the Red Oak Borer attacks various oak species including Quercus velutina, Quercus rubra, and Quercus coccinea.

It was described by Haldeman in 1847.

== Appearance ==
Red Oak Borers have characteristic eggs and larvae of woodboring cerambycids. Adults are sexually dimorphic.

- Oblong, cream-colored eggs that are 0.1 in (2-3 mm) long.
- Cream-colored larvae that have dark colored mandibles and small jointed legs on the thorax. More mature larvae can measure up to 1.5-2 inches (4-5 cm) long.
- Pupae are tan colored and furrowed with extremities visible externally.
- Adults measure 0.8-1.2 inches (2-3 cm); color is a faded combination of tan, brown, and red. Female antennae are approximately body length, while males' measure twice the body length. Females tend to have larger bodies.

== Identification ==
Red Oak Borer attacks can be identified by key indicators.

- Appearance of crescent-shaped holes, approximately 0.1 inches (3 mm) long, on bark surface
- Late Instar feeding galleries are teardrop-shaped and relatively large in size.
- Adults exiting the tree create large circular holes.
