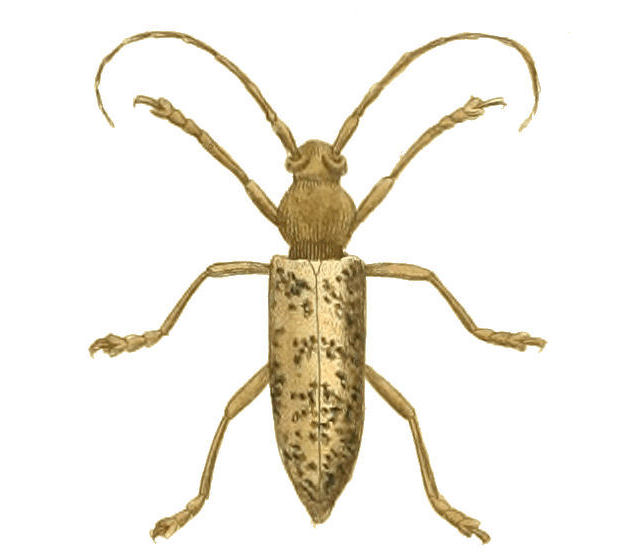
- Illustrations of Exotic Entomology Stenocorus Atomarius

Scientific classification
- Domain: Eukaryota
- Kingdom: Animalia
- Phylum: Arthropoda
- Class: Insecta
- Order: Coleoptera
- Suborder: Polyphaga
- Infraorder: Cucujiformia
- Family: Cerambycidae
- Tribe: Elaphidiini
- Genus: Enaphalodes

= Enaphalodes =

Genus of beetles

Enaphalodes is a genus of beetles in the family Cerambycidae, containing the following species:

- Enaphalodes archboldi Lingafelter & Chemsak, 2002
- Enaphalodes atomarius (Drury, 1773)
- Enaphalodes boyacanus Martins, 2005
- Enaphalodes coronatus (White, 1853)
- Enaphalodes cortiphagus (Craighead, 1923)
- Enaphalodes hispicornis (Linnaeus, 1767)
- Enaphalodes niveitectus (Schaeffer, 1905)
- Enaphalodes rufulus (Haldeman, 1847)
- Enaphalodes seminitidus (Horn in Leng, 1885)
- Enaphalodes taeniatus (LeConte, 1854)
