= Bucculatrix domicola =

Scientific classification
- Kingdom: Animalia
- Phylum: Arthropoda
- Clade: Pancrustacea
- Class: Insecta
- Order: Lepidoptera
- Family: Bucculatricidae
- Genus: Bucculatrix
- Species: B. domicola

Binomial name
- Bucculatrix domicola Braun, 1963

Species of moth

Bucculatrix domicola is a moth in the family Bucculatricidae. It is found in North America, where it has been recorded from Ohio and New Jersey. It was first described in 1963 by Annette Frances Braun.

The wingspan is 7.0–7.5 mm.

The larvae feed on Quercus palustris and Quercus shumardii. They mine the leaves of their host plants.
