= Enaphalodes boyacanus =

Scientific classification
- Domain: Eukaryota
- Kingdom: Animalia
- Phylum: Arthropoda
- Class: Insecta
- Order: Coleoptera
- Suborder: Polyphaga
- Infraorder: Cucujiformia
- Family: Cerambycidae
- Genus: Enaphalodes
- Species: E. boyacanus

Binomial name
- Enaphalodes boyacanus Martins, 2005

Species of beetle

Enaphalodes boyacanus is a species of beetle in the family Cerambycidae. It was described by Martins in 2005.
