= Enaphalodes hispicornis =

Scientific classification
- Kingdom: Animalia
- Phylum: Arthropoda
- Class: Insecta
- Order: Coleoptera
- Suborder: Polyphaga
- Infraorder: Cucujiformia
- Family: Cerambycidae
- Genus: Enaphalodes
- Species: E. hispicornis

Binomial name
- Enaphalodes hispicornis (Linnaeus, 1767)

Species of beetle

Enaphalodes hispicornis is a species of beetle in the family Cerambycidae. It was described by Carl Linnaeus in his 12th edition of Systema Naturae 1767.
