= Enaphalodes seminitidus =

Scientific classification
- Domain: Eukaryota
- Kingdom: Animalia
- Phylum: Arthropoda
- Class: Insecta
- Order: Coleoptera
- Suborder: Polyphaga
- Infraorder: Cucujiformia
- Family: Cerambycidae
- Genus: Enaphalodes
- Species: E. seminitidus

Binomial name
- Enaphalodes seminitidus (Horn in Leng, 1885)

Species of beetle

Enaphalodes seminitidus is a species of beetle in the family Cerambycidae. It was described by Horn in 1885.
