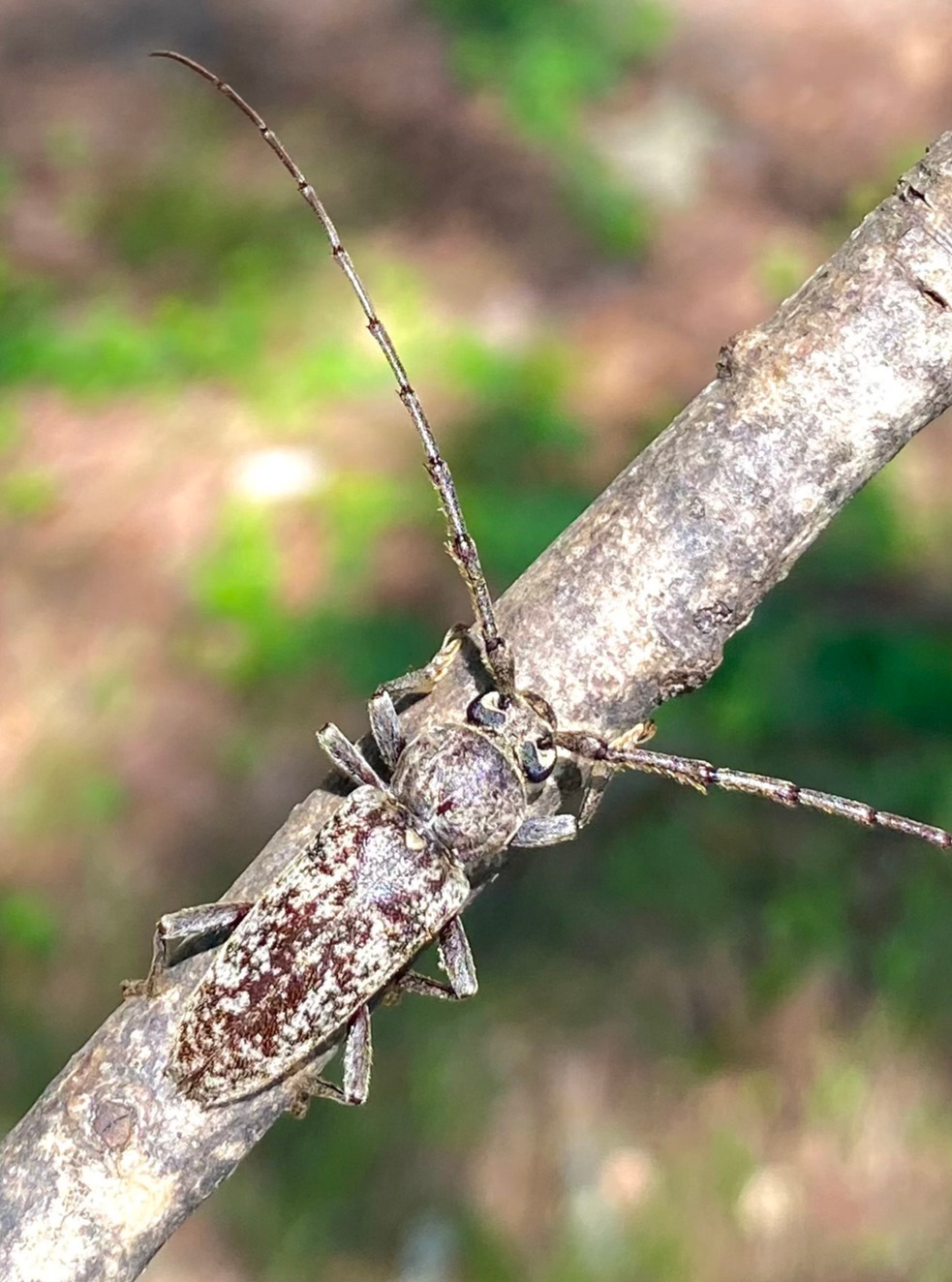

Scientific classification
- Domain: Eukaryota
- Kingdom: Animalia
- Phylum: Arthropoda
- Class: Insecta
- Order: Coleoptera
- Suborder: Polyphaga
- Infraorder: Cucujiformia
- Family: Cerambycidae
- Genus: Enaphalodes
- Species: E. atomarius

Binomial name
- Enaphalodes atomarius (Drury, 1773)

= Enaphalodes atomarius =

Species of beetle

Enaphalodes atomarius, also known as the robust oak borer, is a species of beetle in the family Cerambycidae. It was described by Dru Drury in 1773 from New York City.

== Description ==
Head brownish black, covered with short yellowish-grey pile. Thorax dirty black, covered with yellow-grey pile; cylindrical, and without any spines or risings. Antennae dusky brown; having a spine on each joint, except that next to the head, and about the length of the insect. Scutellum very small. Elytra black, mottled with yellow grey; being margined at the sides and suture, and not reaching or covering the anus, each having two spines at the extremity. Abdomen and breast greyish brown, as are the legs, each of which is furnished with a spine at the tip of the tibiae. Length of body 2/3 inch (17 mm).
