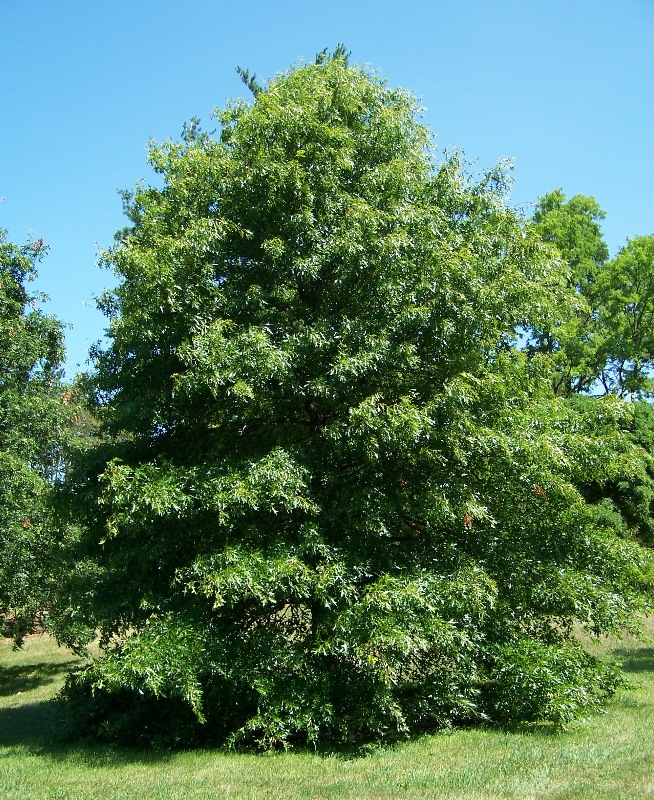

Conservation status
- Least Concern (IUCN 3.1)

Scientific classification
- Kingdom: Plantae
- Clade: Embryophytes
- Clade: Tracheophytes
- Clade: Angiosperms
- Clade: Eudicots
- Clade: Rosids
- Order: Fagales
- Family: Fagaceae
- Genus: Quercus
- Subgenus: Quercus subg. Quercus
- Section: Quercus sect. Lobatae
- Species: Q. palustris

Binomial name
- Quercus palustris Münchh.
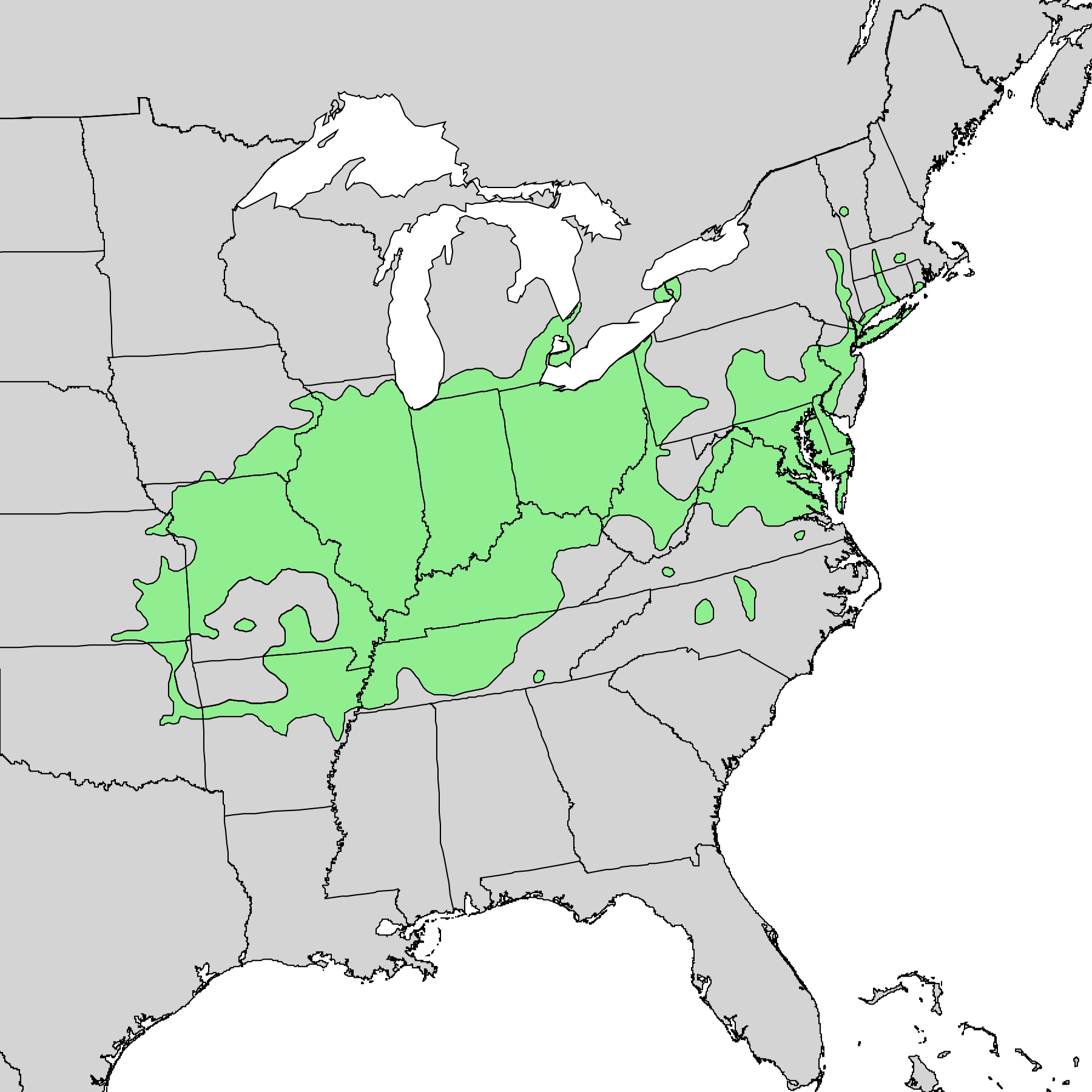

Synonyms
- Quercus palustris var. heterophylla Cockerell; Quercus rubra var. dissecta Lam.; Quercus rubra var. palustris (Münchh.) Kuntze

= Quercus palustris =

Pin oak

Species of oak tree

Quercus palustris, also called pin oak, swamp oak, or swamp Spanish oak, is a tree in the red oak section (Quercus sect. Lobatae) of the genus Quercus. Pin oak is one of the most commonly used landscaping oaks in its native range due to its ease of transplant, relatively fast growth, and pollution tolerance.

== Description ==
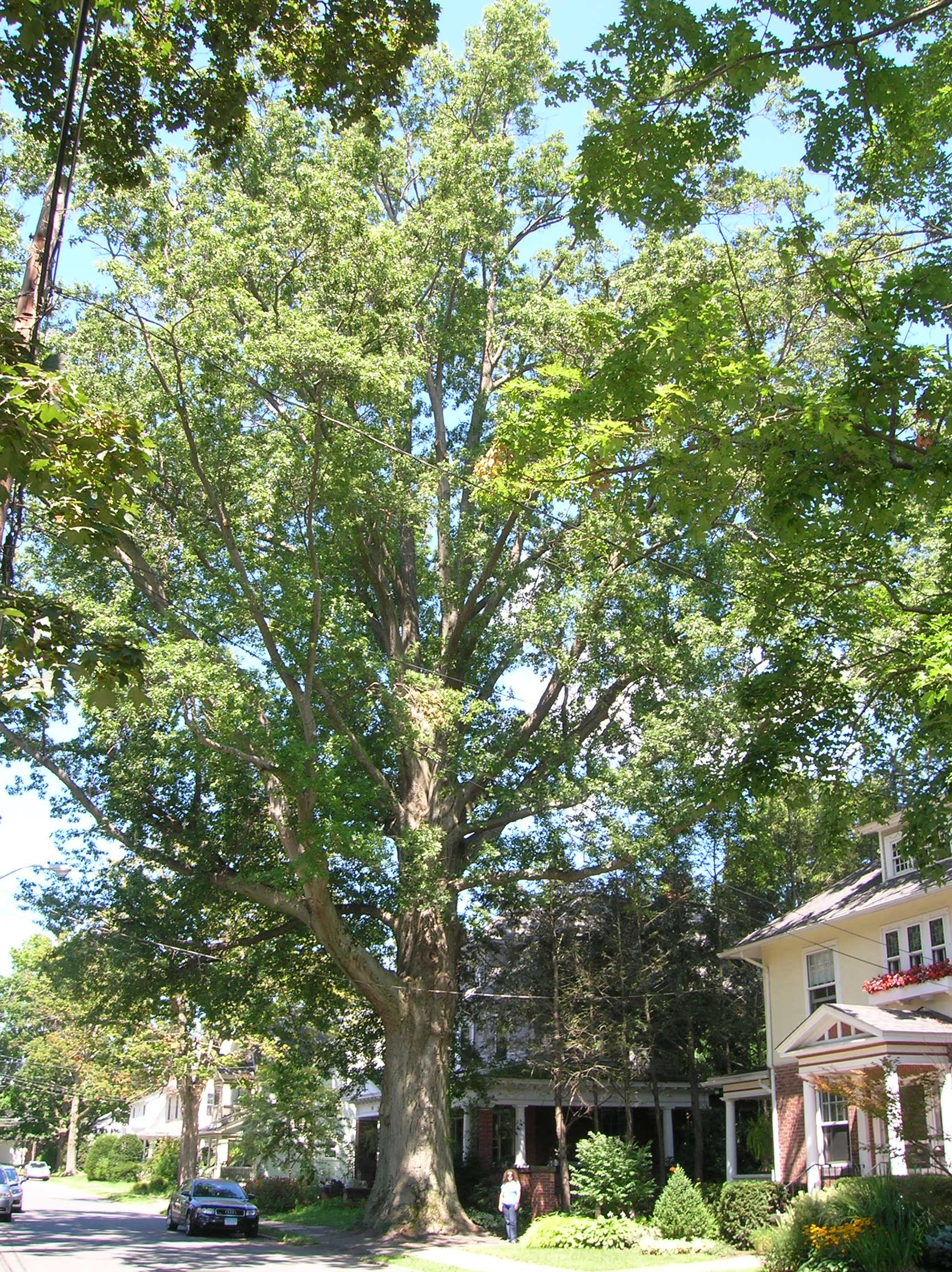
Largest known pin oak in New England, located in Northampton, Massachusetts. 2005 measurements: Height 32.9 metres (107.9 ft), circumference 5.3 metres (17.4 ft), average spread 29 metres (96 ft)

Quercus palustris is a medium-sized deciduous tree growing to 18–22 metres (59–72 feet) tall, with a trunk up to 1 m (3 1/2 ft) in diameter. It has an 8–14 m (26–46 ft) spread. A 10-year-old tree grown in full sun will be about 8 m (26 ft) tall. Young trees have a straight, columnar trunk with smooth bark and a pyramidal canopy.

By the time the tree is 40 years old, it develops more rough bark with a loose, spreading canopy. This canopy is considered one of the most distinctive features of the pin oak: the upper branches point upwards, the middle branches are at right angles to the trunk, and the lower branches droop downwards.

The leaves are 5–16 centimetres (2–6 1/4 inches) long and 5–12 cm (2–4 3/4 in) broad, lobed, with five or seven lobes. Each lobe has five to seven bristle-tipped teeth. The sinuses are typically U-shaped and extremely deep cut. In fact, roughly the same amount of sinus area exists as actual leaf area. The leaf is mostly hairless, except for a very characteristic tuft of pale orange-brown down on the lower surface where each lobe vein joins the central vein. Overall autumn leaf coloration is generally bronze, though individual leaves may be red for a time, and is not considered particularly distinctive.

The acorns, borne in a shallow, thin cap, are hemispherical, 10–16 millimetres (13/32–5/8 in) long and 9–15 mm (11/32–19/32 in) broad, green maturing pale brown about 18 months after pollination. Unless processed using traditional methods, the acorn is unpalatable because the kernel is very bitter.

In its natural environment pin oak is a relatively short-lived, fast-growing pioneer or riparian species with a lifespan of approximately 120 years against many oaks which can live several centuries. Despite this there are many examples of pin oak that exceed this lifespan. It develops a shallow, fibrous root system, unlike many oaks, which have a strong, deep taproot when young.

A characteristic shared by a few other oak species, and also some beeches and hornbeams, is the retention of leaves through the winter on juvenile trees, a natural phenomenon referred to as marcescence. Young trees under 6 m (20 ft) are often covered with leaves year-round, though the leaves die in the fall, remaining attached to the shoots until the new leaves appear in the spring. As with many other oak species, dead pin oak branches stay on the tree for many years.

=== Flowering and fruiting ===
Like all oaks, flowering and leaf-out occur in late spring when all frost danger has passed. The flowers are monoecious catkins which, being self-incompatible, require the presence of another oak for pollination. Any species in the red oak group can serve as a pollinator, but in pin oak's natural range, this will usually be northern red oak or scarlet oak. Interspecies hybridization occurs freely. The acorns require two growing seasons to develop.

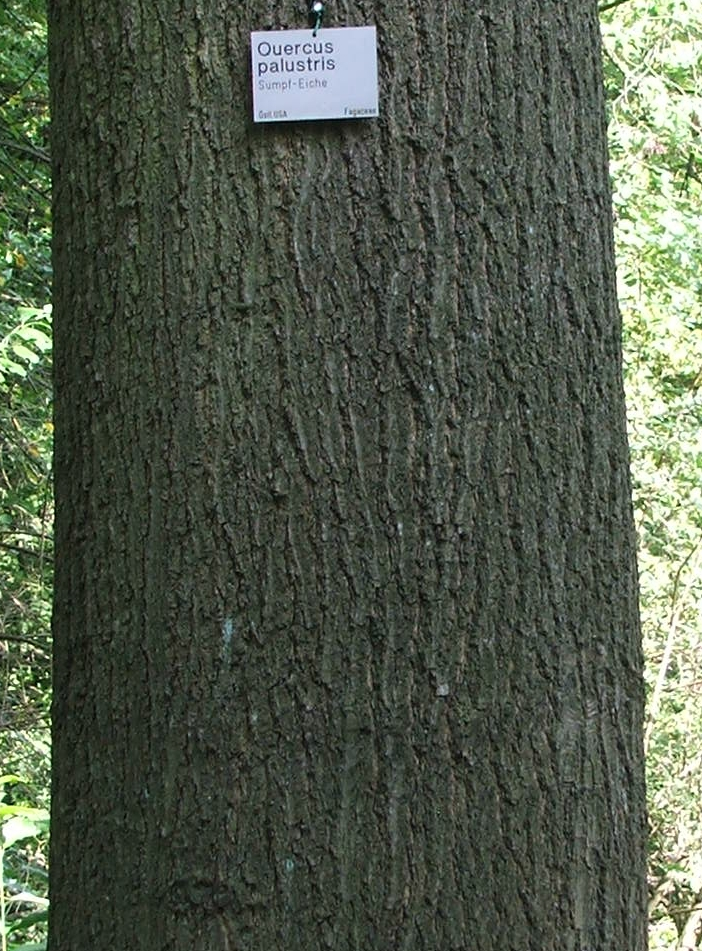
Bark

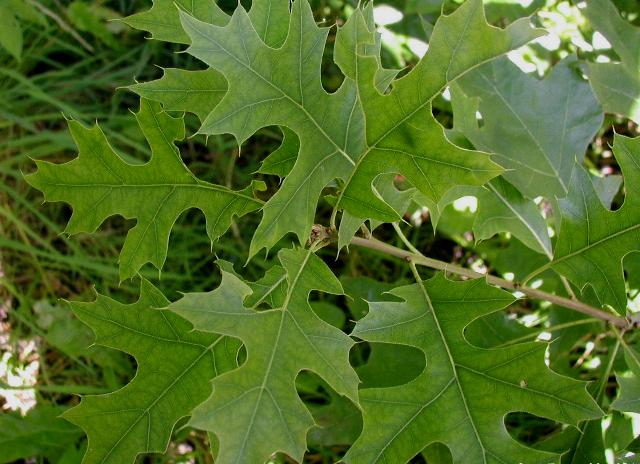
Leaves

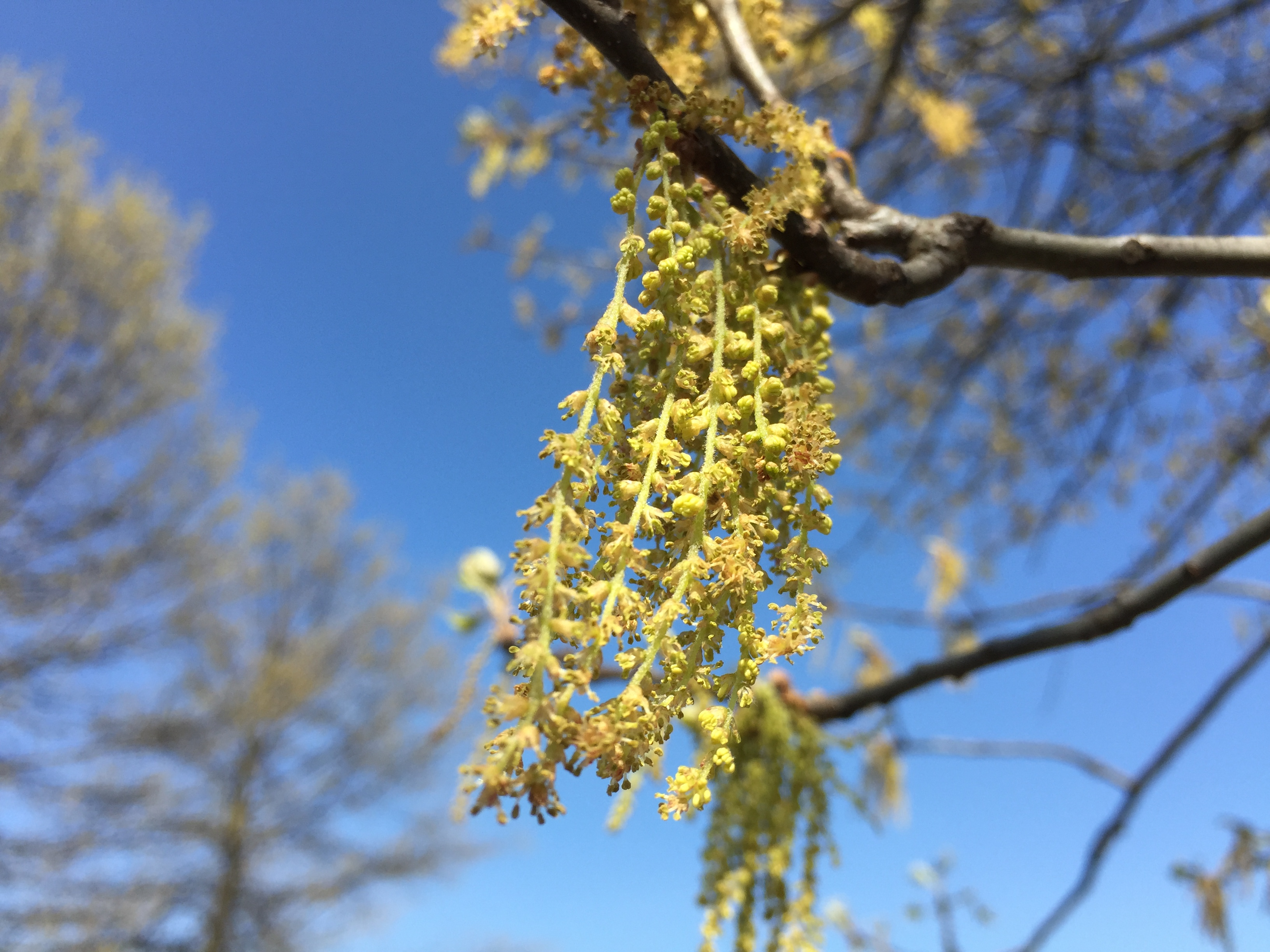
Catkins of pin oak

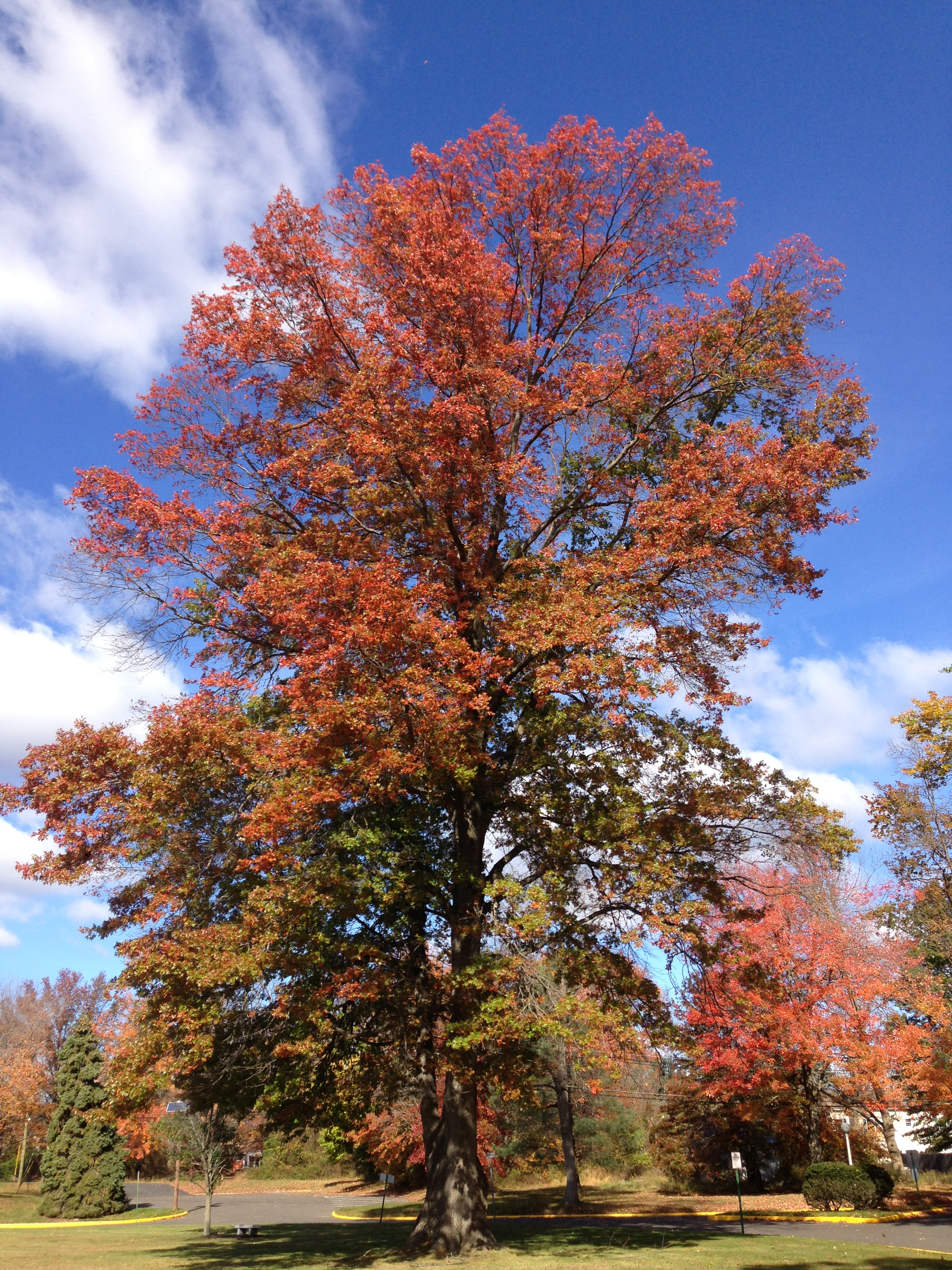
Mature pin oak displaying typical bronze autumn coloration

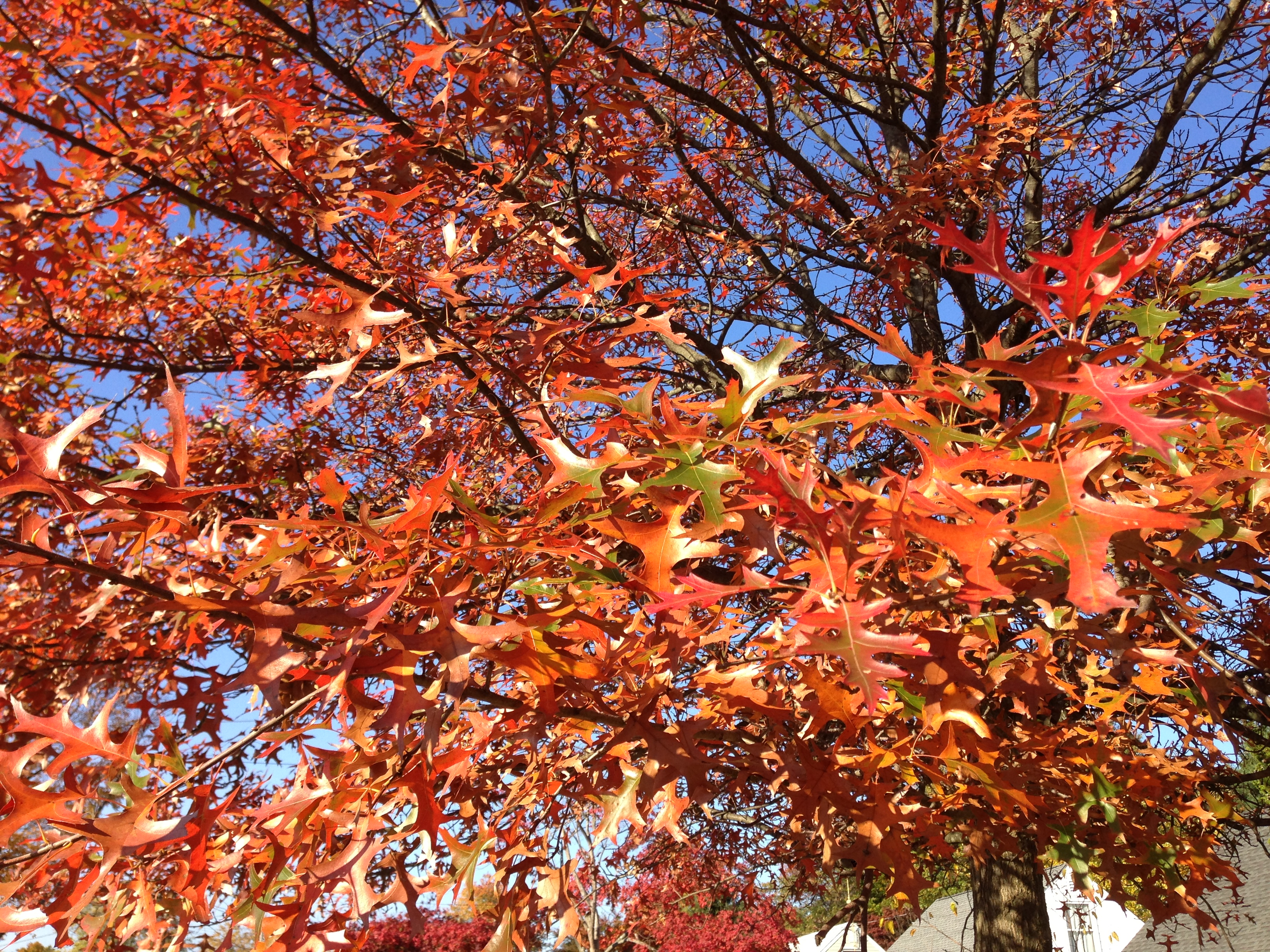
Typical autumn foliage

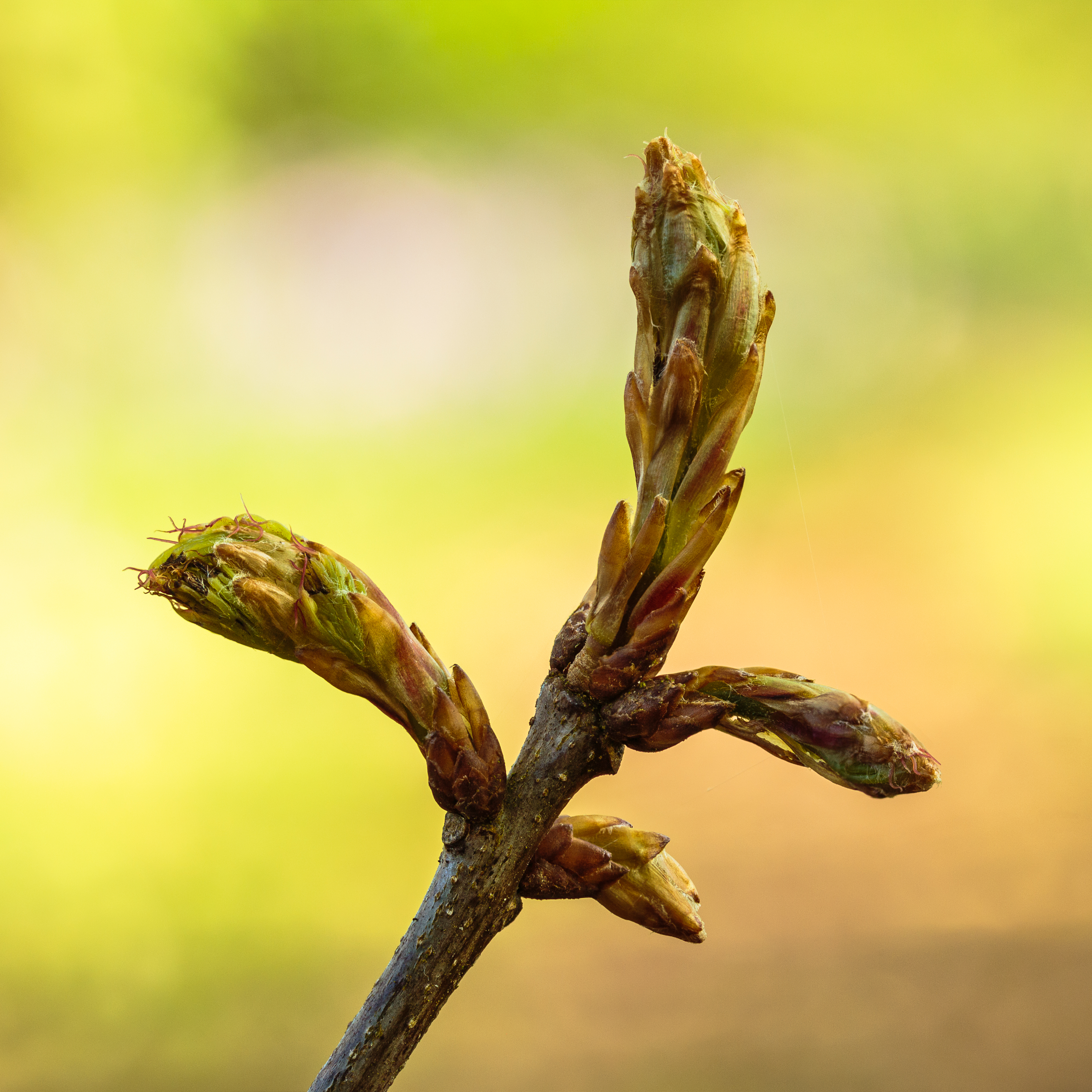
Emerging young shoots.

== Name ==
The Latin specific epithet palustris means "of marshland" or "of swamps", referring to its natural habitat.

The common name "pin oak" is possibly due to the many small, slender twigs, but may also be from the historical use of the hard wood for pins in wooden building construction.

== Distribution and habitat ==
Q. palustris is mainly distributed in the eastern and central United States from Connecticut in the northeast, west to eastern Oklahoma and Kansas, and south to Georgia. It is also native in the extreme south of Ontario, Canada.

The pin oak is also well adapted to life in England and Australia (where it has been introduced), and is quite widespread across the Australian continent, especially in the cooler southern States such as Victoria and New South Wales. It is also well adapted to life in South Africa and Argentina, especially in the Río de la Plata region.

It is naturally a wetland tree, confined to acidic soils, and does not tolerate limestone or sandy Florida soil, and grows at low altitudes from sea level up to 350 m (1,148 ft).

It grows primarily on level or nearly level, poorly drained, alluvial floodplain and river-bottom soils with high clay content. They are usually found on sites that flood intermittently during the dormant season, but do not ordinarily flood during the growing season. They do not grow on the lowest, most poorly drained sites that may be covered with standing water through much of the growing season. However, they do grow extensively on poorly drained upland "pin oak flats" on the glacial till plains of southwestern Ohio, southern Illinois and Indiana, and northern Missouri. The level topography and presence of a claypan in the soil of these areas cause these sites to be excessively wet in winter and spring.

== Ecology ==
=== Associated forest cover ===
Pin oak is a major species in only one forest cover type, pin oak–sweetgum, which is found on bottom lands and some upland sites throughout the central portion of the pin oak range. Pin oak and sweetgum (Liquidambar styraciflua) vary in their relative proportions in this cover type. Large areas of almost pure pin oak occur on the "pin oak flats" of the upland glacial till plains or in the bottom lands of the lower Ohio and central Mississippi River valleys. Associated species in this forest type include red maple (Acer rubrum), American elm (Ulmus americana), black tupelo (Nyssa sylvatica), swamp white oak (Quercus bicolor), willow oak (Quercus phellos), overcup oak (Quercus lyrata), bur oak (Quercus macrocarpa), green ash (Fraxinus pennsylvanica), Nuttall's oak (Quercus texana), swamp chestnut oak (Quercus michauxii), and shellbark (Carya laciniosa) and shagbark (Carya ovata) hickories.

Pin oak is an associated species in silver maple–American elm forests in the bottom lands along the Ohio, Wabash, Mississippi, and Missouri Rivers. A variant of this type, silver maple–American elm–pin oak–sweetgum, is found along major streams in southern Illinois and Indiana.

Pin oak also occurs in black ash–American elm–red maple forests in poorly drained bottom lands in northern Ohio and Indiana along with silver maple (Acer saccharinum), swamp white oak, sycamore (Platanus occidentalis), black tupelo, and eastern cottonwood (Populus deltoides).

=== Reaction to competition ===
Pin oak is classed as intolerant of shade. It is less tolerant than elm, boxelder (Acer negundo), sweetgum, hackberry (Celtis occidentalis), and ash, but is more tolerant than eastern cottonwood and black willow. Pin oak usually grows in even-aged stands of dominant and co-dominant trees. Intermediate and suppressed trees in such stands usually die within a few years of being overtopped. Single pin oaks in mixed stands usually are dominants. Pin oak is considered a subclimax species. It persists on heavy, wet soils because it produces an abundance of acorns which, if released, grow faster on these sites than most of its competitors.

=== Damaging agents ===
Although pin oak is very tolerant of dormant-season flooding, it is much less tolerant of growing-season flooding. Trees may be injured or killed by intermittent growing-season flooding over several successive years. The trees can usually survive one growing season of continuous flooding, but will be killed by continuous flooding over 2 or 3 consecutive years. Pin oak is rated as "intermediately tolerant" to growing-season flooding. Also, since the bark of pin oak is relatively thin, the species is especially susceptible to damage by fire and decay associated with fire wounds.

=== Associated species ===
Due to similarity in leaf shape, the pin oak is often confused with scarlet oak and black oak, and occasionally, red oak. However, it can be distinguished by its distinctive dead branches on the lower trunk ("pins"), and its uniquely shaped crown. The sinuses on pin oak leaves are also deeply cut, often covering just as much area as the leaf itself.

The pin oak is the only known food plant of Bucculatrix domicola caterpillars.

== Uses ==
In its native range, pin oak is the most commonly used landscaping oak along with northern red oak due to its ease of transplant, relatively fast growth, and pollution tolerance. However, as it is naturally adapted to moist, acidic soils, it may develop a condition known as iron chlorosis on less suitable locations, causing the tree to shed leaves during the growing season and rot from the top down. Mature pin oaks are often too big to treat and this nutrient deficiency on alkaline soil may eventually kill them. The drooping lower branches can also be a problem, interfering with access for traffic and pedestrians.

It is also cultivated in parks and large gardens in the United Kingdom, and has gained the Royal Horticultural Society's Award of Garden Merit.

The wood is generally marketed as red oak, but is of significantly inferior quality, being somewhat weaker, often with many small knots. The wood is hard and heavy and is used in general construction and for firewood. The bark was used by some Native American tribes to make a drink for treatment of intestinal pain.
