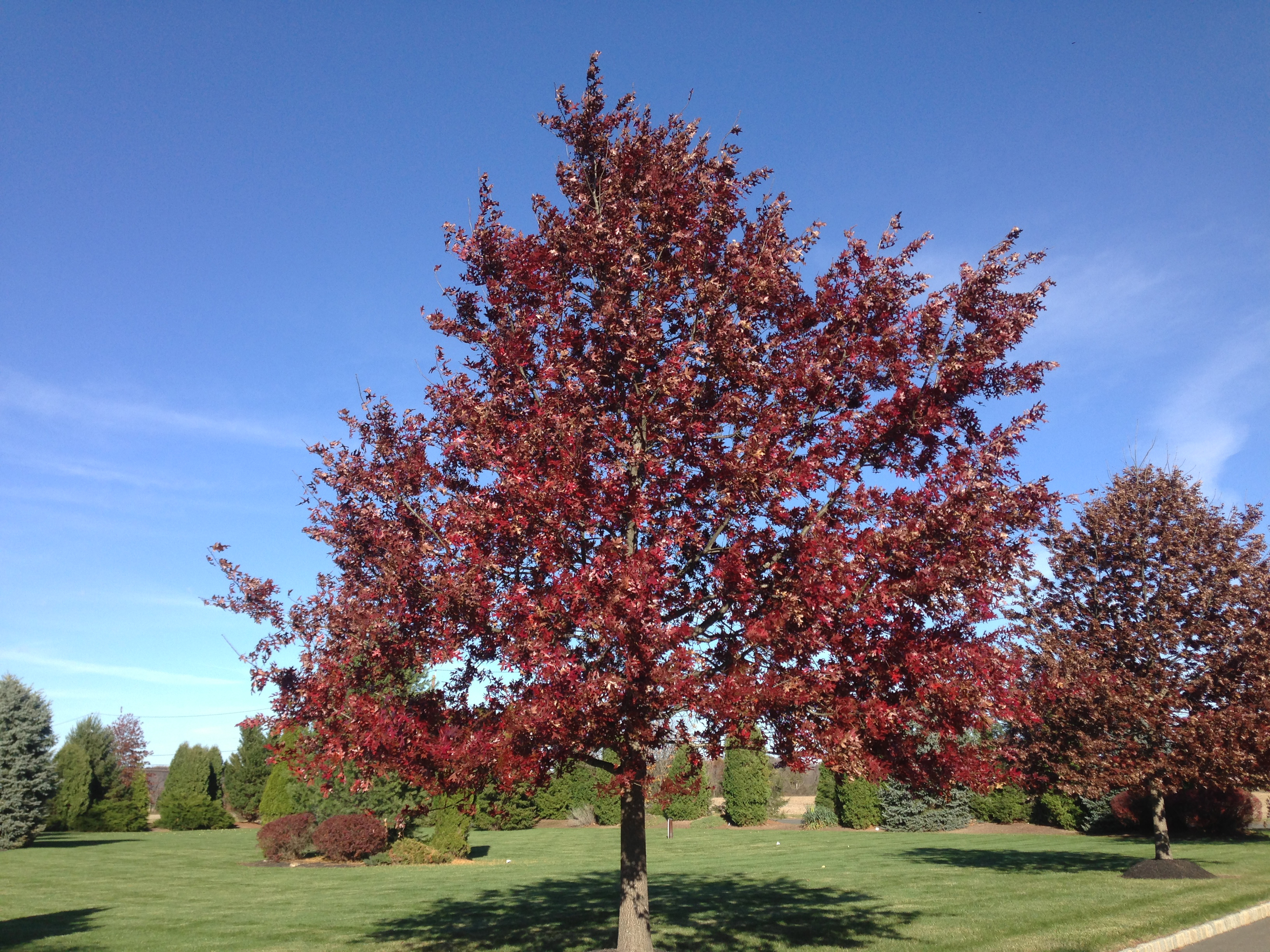
- Tree in autumn

Conservation status
- Least Concern (IUCN 3.1)

Scientific classification
- Kingdom: Plantae
- Clade: Tracheophytes
- Clade: Angiosperms
- Clade: Eudicots
- Clade: Rosids
- Order: Fagales
- Family: Fagaceae
- Genus: Quercus
- Subgenus: Quercus subg. Quercus
- Section: Quercus sect. Lobatae
- Species: Q. coccinea

Binomial name
- Quercus coccinea Muenchh.
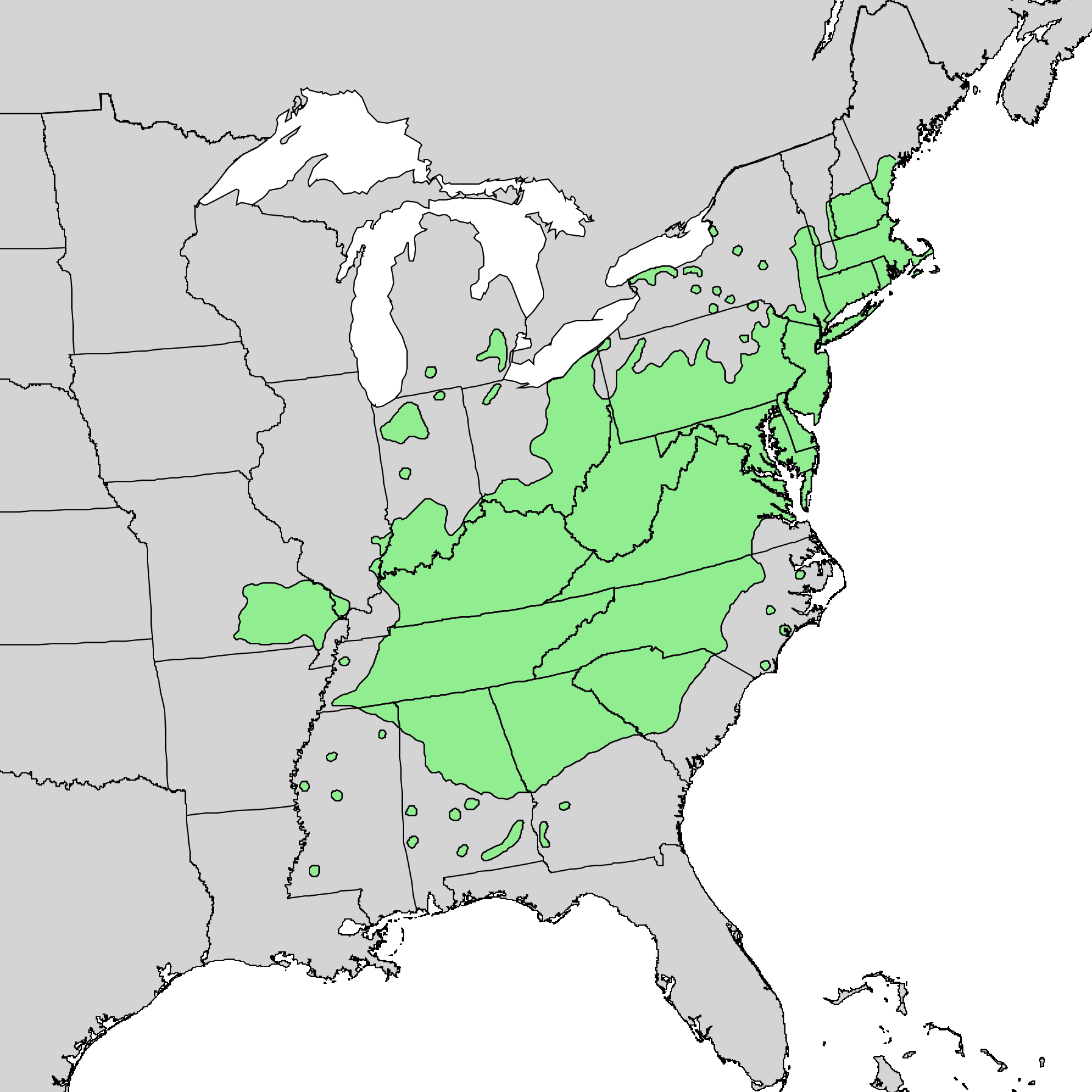

Synonyms
- List: Quercus acuta Raf.; Quercus coccinea var. cucullata Petz. & G.Kirchn.; Quercus coccinea var. pendula Petz. & G.Kirchn.; Quercus coccinea var. rugelii A.DC.; Quercus coccinea var. tuberculata Sarg.; Quercus coccinea var. undulata Petz. & G.Kirchn.; Quercus palustris Regel ex A.DC.; Quercus rubra var. coccinea (Münchh.) Aiton

= Quercus coccinea =

Scarlet oak

Species of oak tree

Quercus coccinea, the scarlet oak, is a deciduous tree in the red oak section Lobatae of the genus Quercus, in the family Fagaceae.

It is primarily distributed in the central and eastern United States. It occurs on dry, sandy, usually acidic soil. It is often an important canopy species in oak–heath forests. The scarlet oak is the official tree of Washington, D.C.

== Description ==
Quercus coccinea is a medium to large deciduous tree growing to around 5.5–7.3 metres (18–24 feet) with an open, rounded crown; the maximum height is approximately 30 m (100 ft). The trunk diameter at breast height is typically 61 to 91 centimetres (24 to 36 inches) It is a medium-size tree that grows fast and matures relatively early. Seedlings develop a strong taproot with relatively few lateral roots.

The leaves are glossy green, 7–17 cm (2 3/4–6 3/4 in) long and 8–13 cm (3 1/4–5 in) broad, with seven lobes, and deep sinuses between the lobes. Each lobe has 3–7 bristle-tipped teeth. The leaf is hairless (unlike the related pin oak (Q. palustris), with tufts of pale orange-brown down where the lobe veins join the central vein). The foliage generally becomes bright scarlet in autumn. The flower color is yellow to green, depending on the season.

The acorns are ovate, 7–13 millimetres (1/4–1/2 inch) broad and 17–31 mm (5/8–1 1/4 in) long, a third to a half covered in a deep cup, green maturing pale brown about 18 months after pollination; the kernel is very bitter.

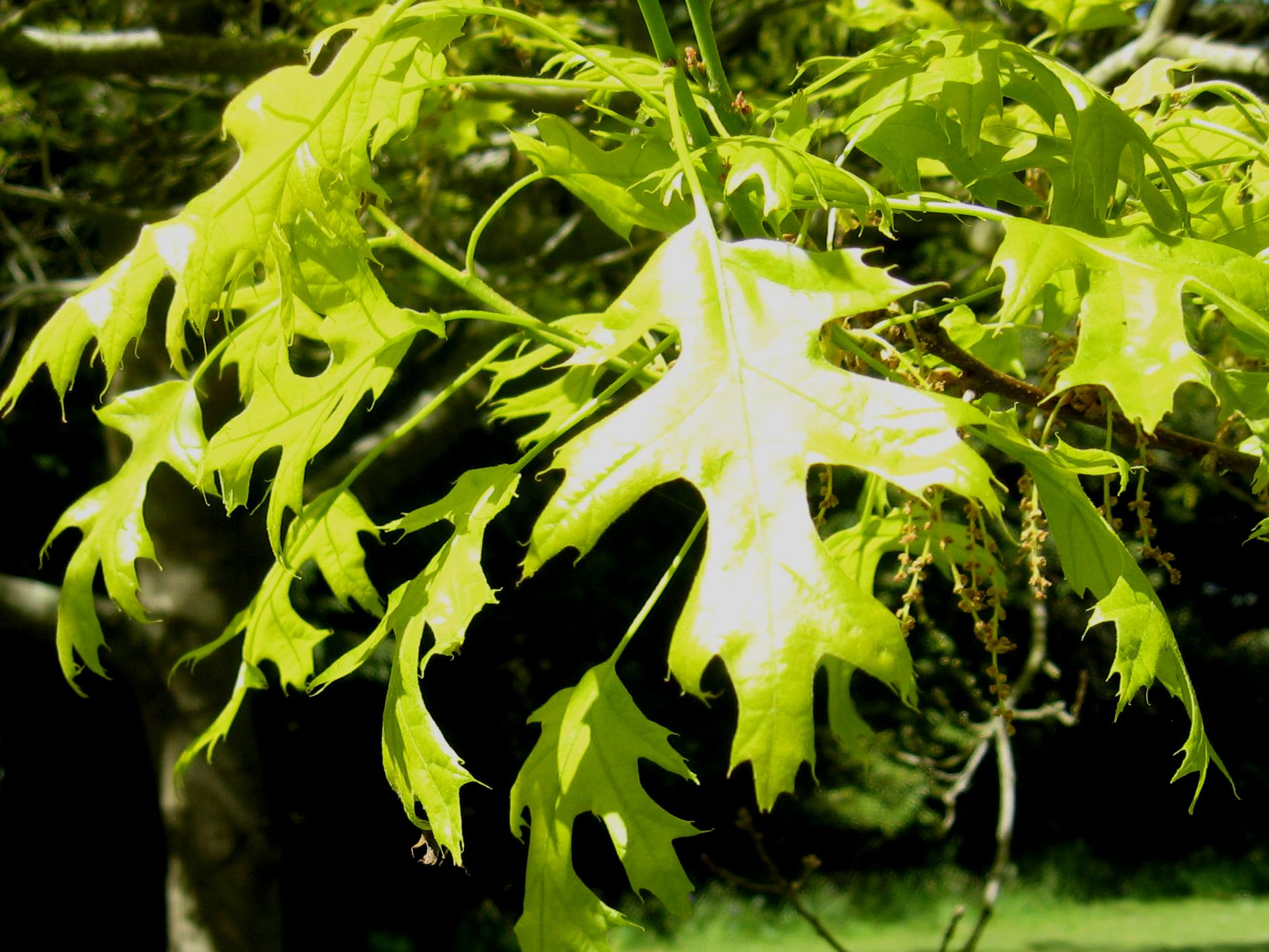
Foliage and male flower in May, Exbury, UK

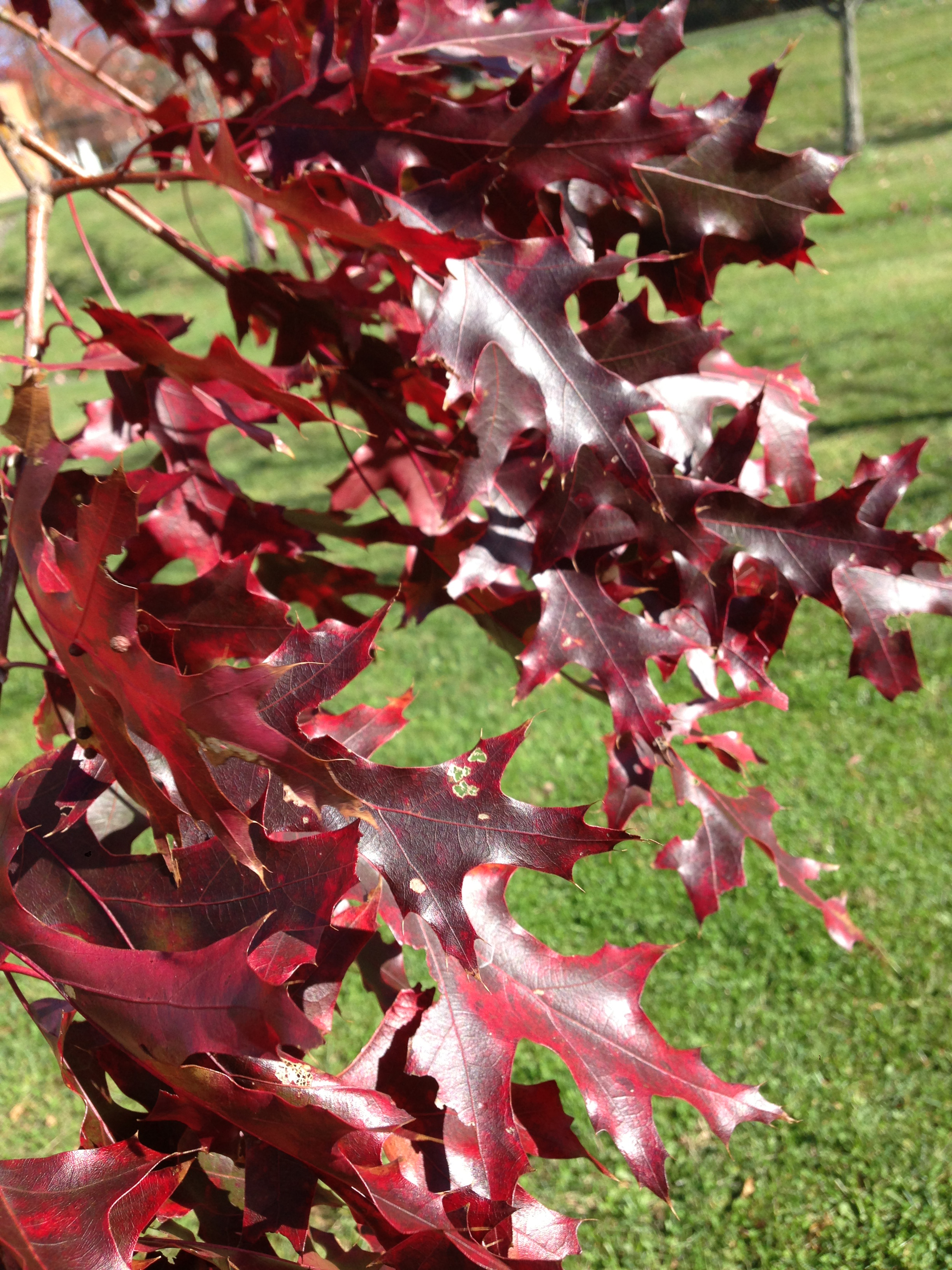
Autumn foliage, Ewing, New Jersey

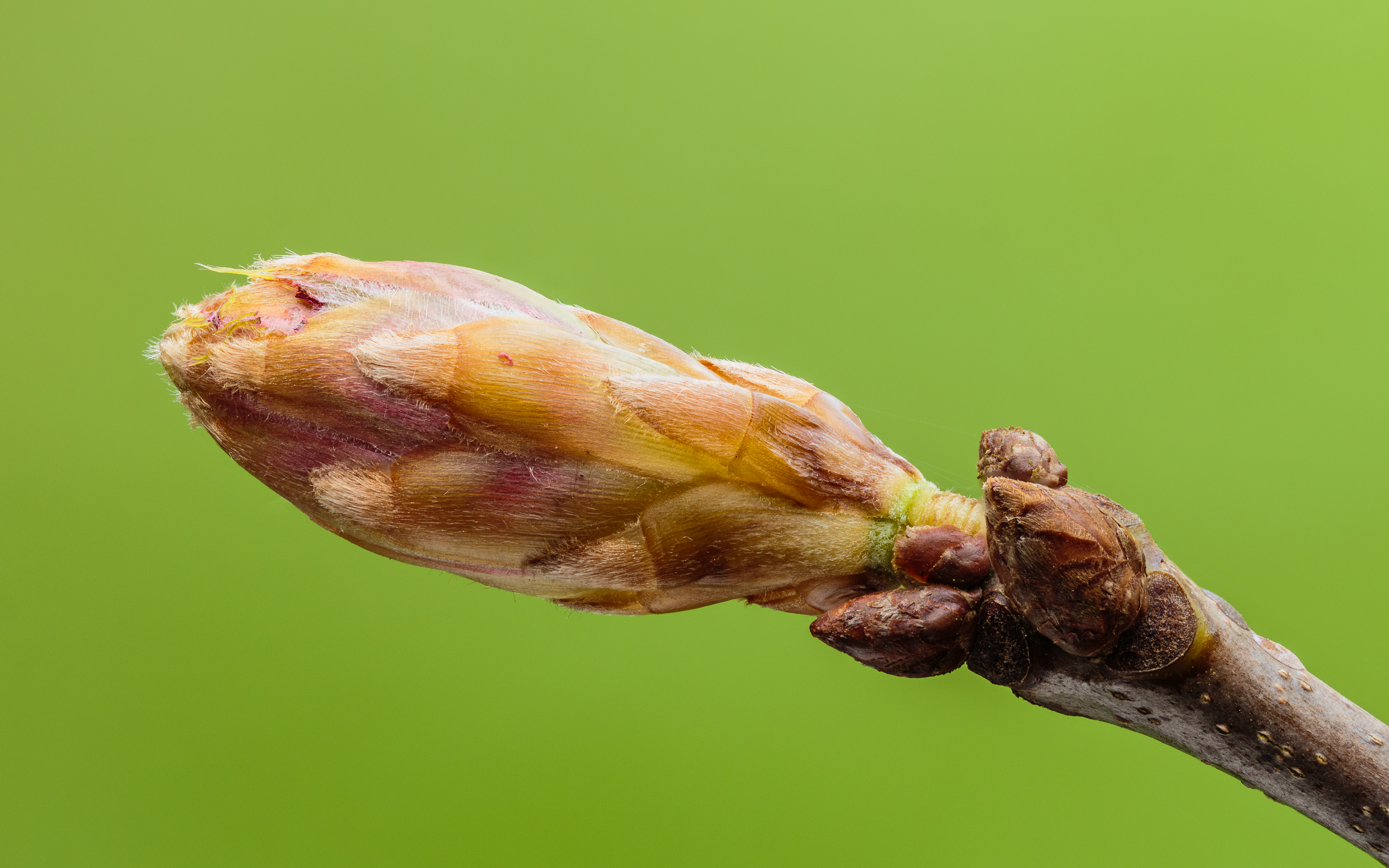
Leaf bud in development.

=== Similar species ===
It can be mistaken for the pin oak, the black oak (Q. velutina), or occasionally the red oak (Q. rubra). On the scarlet oak the sinuses between lobes are C-shaped in comparison to pin oak, which has U-shaped sinuses and the acorns are half covered by a deep cap. Additionally, pin oak foliage generally turns bronze in autumn.

== Taxonomy ==
The common English name is derived from the fall (autumn) coloration of the foliage.

== Distribution and habitat ==
It is primarily distributed in the central and eastern United States, from southern Maine west to Wisconsin, Michigan and Missouri, and south as far as Louisiana, Alabama, and Georgia. The tree needs full exposure to sunlight for best growth. Its preferred soil ranges from dry to somewhat dry well-drained, acidic soil.

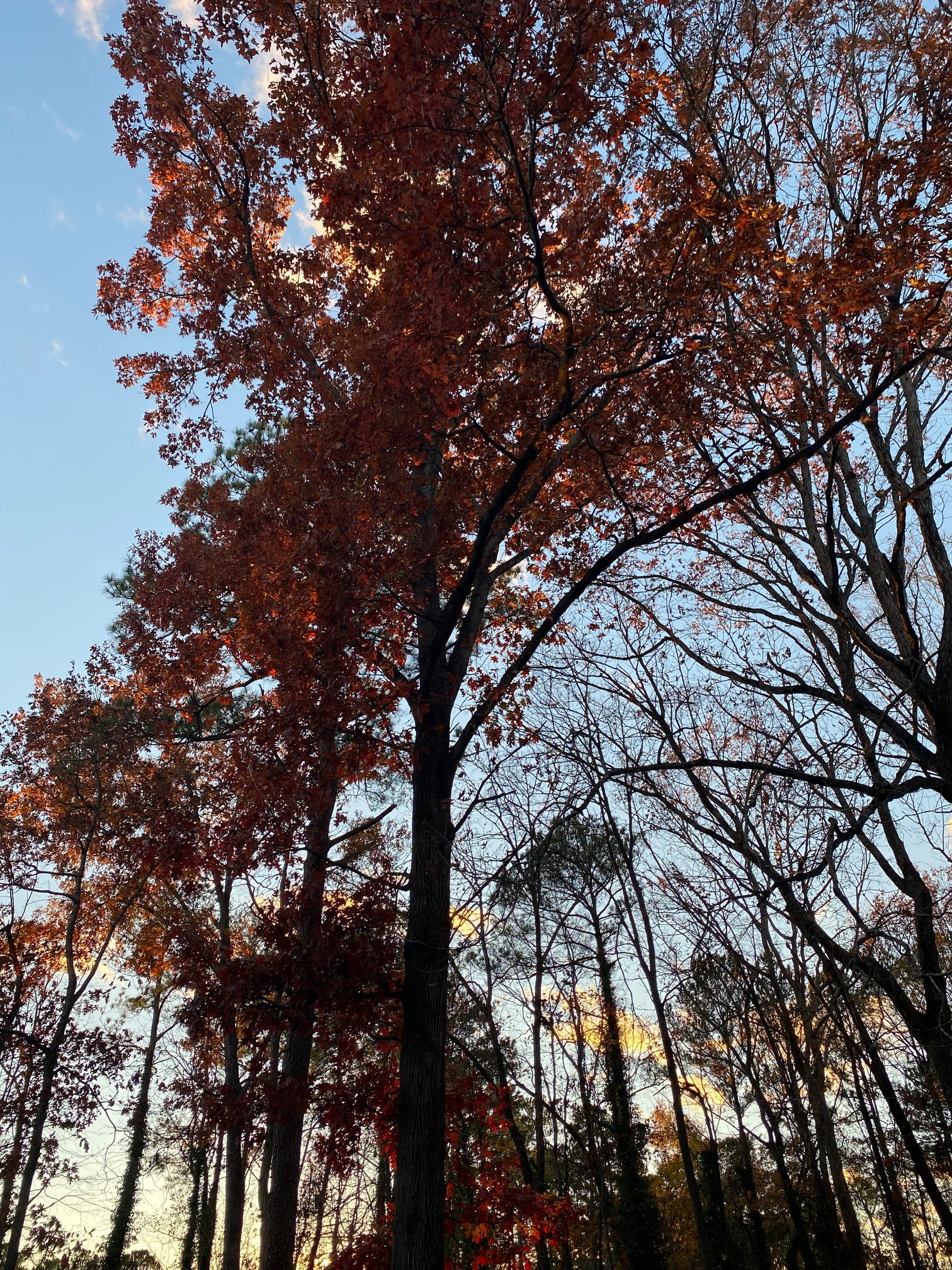
Scarlet oak in northwestern metro Atlanta

== Ecology ==
=== Forestry ===
April and May are flowering months for the scarlet oak. During this time, factors such as elevation and weather play a significant role in the flowering process. It takes about two seasons for the acorns to mature following maturation. Scarlet oak is prominent as a co-component of forests, including species such as white oak, black oak, and northern red oak. When at a lower elevation surrounding the Appalachian Mountains, pine forests and heaths are a common component.

Oak seeds are faster-growing than many other trees and can compete very successfully. To regenerate oaks, the oak saplings should be 4–5 ft (1.2–1.5 m) tall before removing the overstory. To favor oak regeneration, non-oak stems in the understory exceeding 4 feet can be controlled by various methods. The quality of the environment impacts oak regeneration.

Seed production starts when the tree is about 20 years old. Seed production reaches a maximum at approximately 50 years of age. The seed production (masting) is highly variable. A good masting year occurs every 3–5 years, depending on the weather and environment.

=== Wildlife ===
Many species of wildlife look to Q. coccinea for shelter, including small- to medium-sized birds, as well as small mammals such as squirrels. It is also a temporary home to various moth larvae throughout the year. It provides food in the form of acorns to many animals, such as woodpeckers, blue jays, squirrels, wild turkeys, white-tailed deer, and black bears.

=== Threats ===
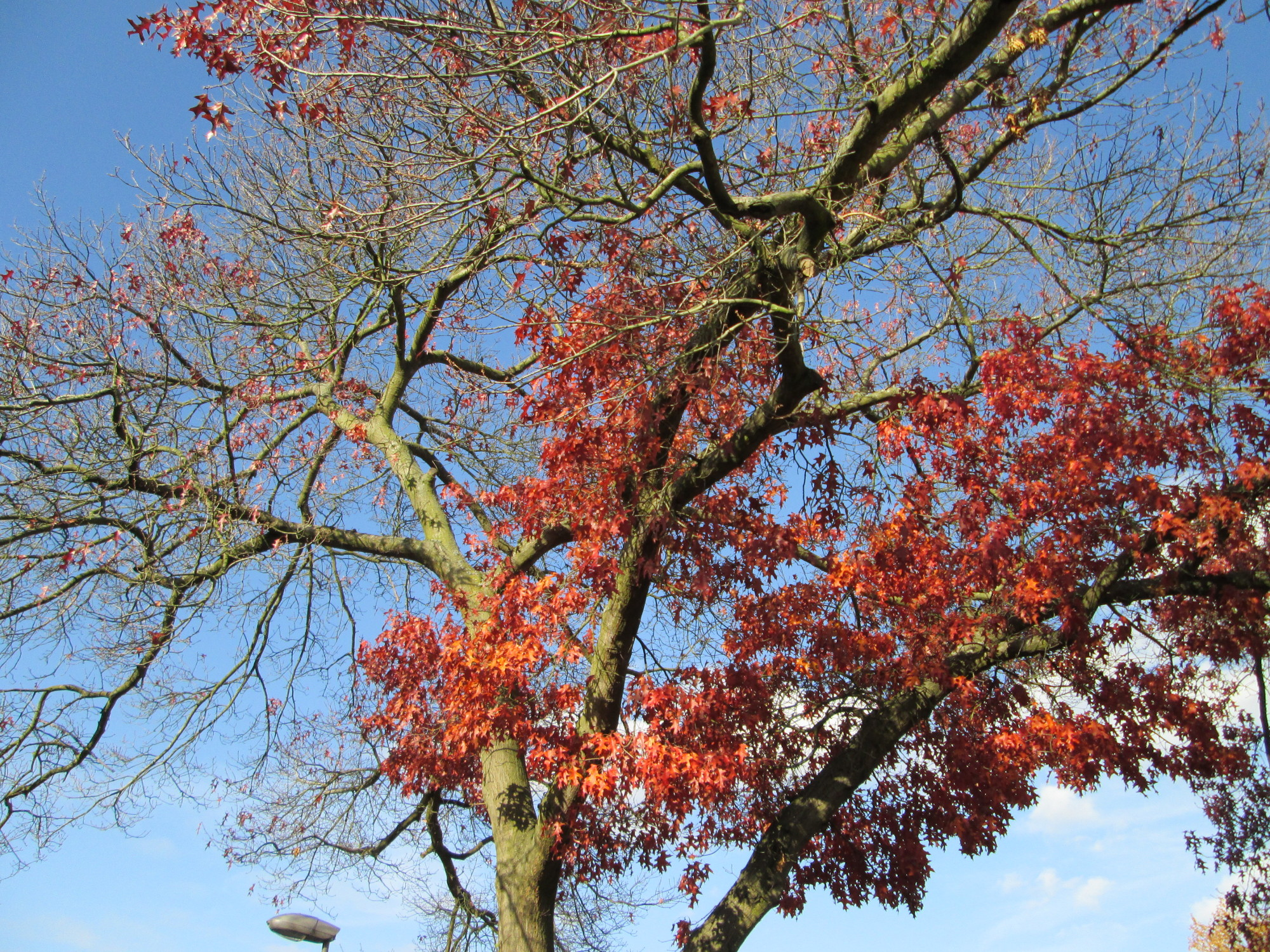
Picture of a grown Quercus coccinea tree.

Cryphonectria parasitica, a bark pathogen, has been known to infect scarlet oak trees particularly in Pennsylvania. Cankers were found on many of these trees due to this parasite during 1989 and 1990. The parasite was removed from 69.7% of infected areas and recovered from 67% of incidents. Spongy moths are known to defoliate a scarlet oak, which can kill the tree. Other defoliating insects capable of killing scarlet oaks include the oak leaftier moth (Acleris semipurpurana), fall cankerworm (Alsophila pometaria), forest tent caterpillar (Malacosoma disstria), and walking stick (Diapheromera femoral).

A few species of insects bore into the scarlet oak bark and trunk, including the towline chestnut borer (Agrilus bilineatus), red oak borer (Enaphalodes rufulus), oak timber worm (Arrenodes minutus), Ambrosia beetles (Scolytinae and Platypodinae spp.), and the larvae of carpenterworms (Prionoxystus spp.).

Gouty galls are commonly found on smaller twigs and limbs due to the gouty oak gall wasp (Callirhytis quercuspunctata). The spongy oak apple gall wasp (Amphibolips confluenta) causes gall growth on leaves and petioles. Black carpenter ants (Camponotus pennsylvanicus) are known for nesting in the scarlet oak trees.

'Oak decline' can be caused by drought, moth defoliation, age, fire, environmental causes, and other factors. From 1968 to 1972, 27% of the scarlet oak population in the Newark watershed in New Jersey died from the spongy moth defoliation, which came before the towline chestnut borer and shoestring root rot attack.

== Conservation status ==
Red oak is not listed in the CITES Appendices, and is considered a least-concern species by the IUCN Red List of Threatened Species.

== Uses ==
Scarlet oak is sometimes planted as an ornamental tree, popular for its bright red fall color. The cultivar 'Splendens' has gained the Royal Horticultural Society's Award of Garden Merit.

Scarlet oak has an excellent red color during the fall months and is typically grown for shade and ornamental purposes. The red oak is a popular selection for lumber and is commonly used as a flooring material.

Scarlet oak wood has a light to medium color consisting of reds and browns. The scarlet oak has a fairly coarse texture with a relatively large pore size. The durability of scarlet oak is less than the white oak, which has a higher level of decay and rot resistance. Scarlet oak lumber is easy to glue and looks attractive after staining and finishing. It has a distinct, appealing smell common with most oaks.

Oak has been classified as a sensitizer, although it does not cause many allergic reactions. Reactions include eye and skin irritations and asthma-like symptoms, but not severe.

White oak is typically more expensive than scarlet oak; red oak is in good supply with reasonable pricing, making it a very popular lumber product throughout the USA.

Scarlet oak is commonly used in furniture, cabinetry, interior trim, flooring, and veneer. Scarlet oak shares many characteristics with red oak and often falls in the same category as red oak (Quercus rubra) in a broad sense

=== Medicinal ===
Quercus coccinea produces galls from insect interactions which may be used to treat hemorrhages, chronic diarrhea, and dysentery.
