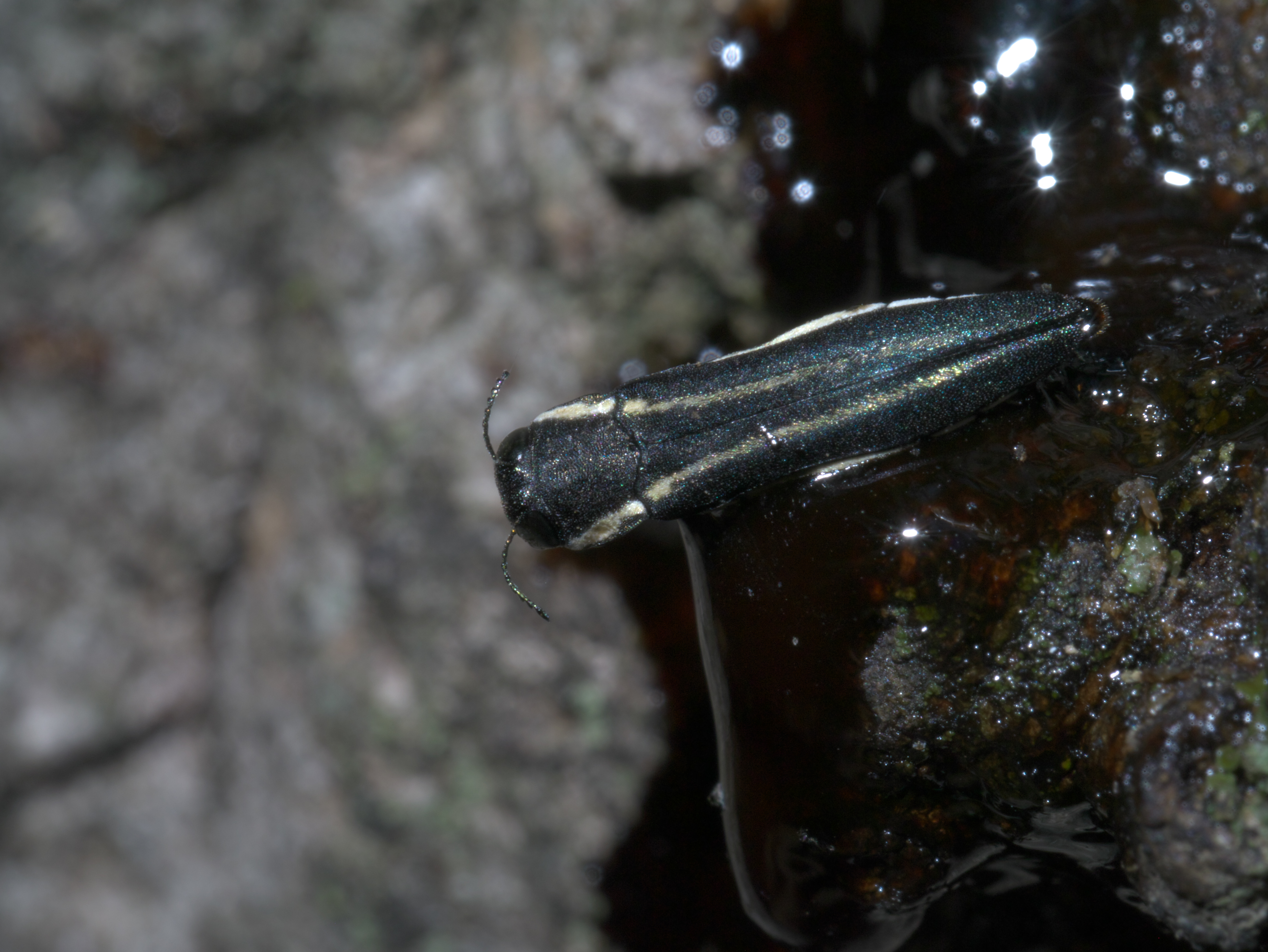

Scientific classification
- Kingdom: Animalia
- Phylum: Arthropoda
- Clade: Pancrustacea
- Class: Insecta
- Order: Coleoptera
- Suborder: Polyphaga
- Infraorder: Elateriformia
- Family: Buprestidae
- Genus: Agrilus
- Species: A. bilineatus

Binomial name
- Agrilus bilineatus (Weber, 1801)

Synonyms
- Agrilus aurolineatus Gory, 1841; Agrilus bivittatus Kirby, 1837; Agrilus flavolineatus Mannerheim, 1837

= Agrilus bilineatus =

Species of beetle

Agrilus bilineatus, the two-lined chestnut borer, is a species of metallic wood-boring beetle in the family Buprestidae. It is native to North America, and has been introduced to Turkey. It is known for its two white lines in the elytra, it bores into chestnut, but also bores into oak trees.
