= List of flora of North Carolina =

List of all flora in the US State of North Carolina

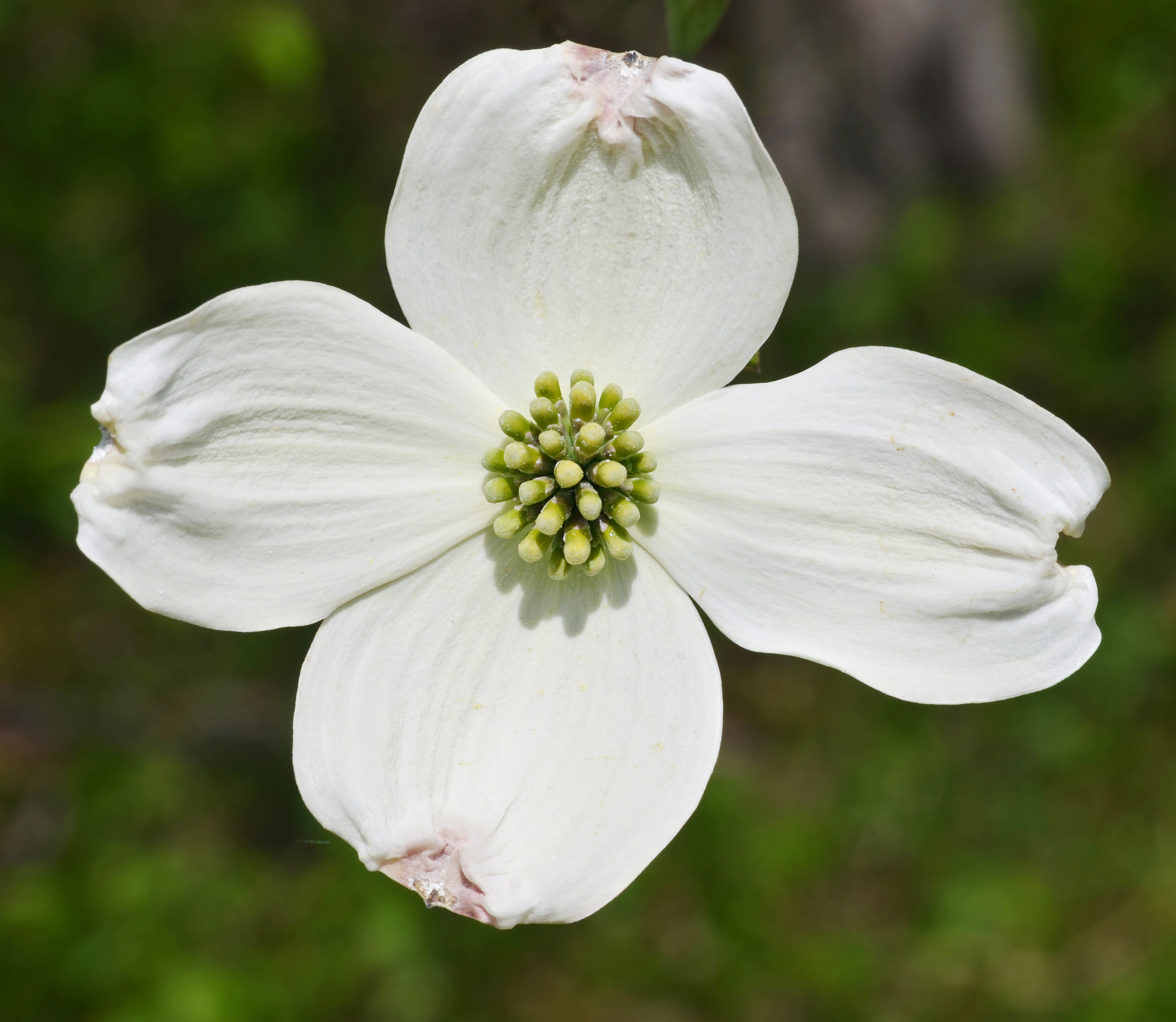
Dogwood is the state flower of North Carolina.

This list includes plant species found in the state of North Carolina. Varieties and subspecies link to their parent species.

Introduced species are designated (I).

== Polypodiales ==
Onocleaceae

- Sensitive fern, Onoclea sensibilis

== Pinales ==
Cupressaceae

- Atlantic white cedar, Chamaecyparis thyoides
- Eastern red cedar, Juniperus virginiana
- Baldcypress, Taxodium distichum

Pinaceae

- Fraser fir, Abies fraseri
- Red spruce, Picea rubens
- Shortleaf pine, Pinus echinata
- Longleaf pine, Pinus palustris
- Table mountain pine, Pinus pungens
- Pitch pine, Pinus rigida
- Pond pine, Pinus serotina
- Eastern white pine, Pinus strobus
- Loblolly pine, Pinus taeda
- Virginia pine, Pinus virginiana
- Eastern hemlock, Tsuga canadensis

== Laurales ==
Lauraceae

- Sassafras, Sassafras albidum

== Magnoliales ==
Magnoliaceae

- Yellow poplar, Liriodendron tulipifera
- Cucumber tree, Magnolia acuminata
- Fraser magnolia, Magnolia fraseri
- Southern magnolia, Magnolia grandiflora
- Sweetbay, Magnolia virginiana

== Alismatales ==
Alismataceae

- Broadleaf arrowhead, Sagittaria latifolia

Araceae

- Jack-in-the-pulpit, Arisaema triphyllum
- Eastern skunk cabbage, Symplocarpus foetidus

== Asparagales ==
Amaryllidaceae

- Canada onion, Allium canadense
- Ramp, Allium tricoccum

Asparagaceae

- False lily-of-the-valley, Maianthemum canadense
- Smooth Solomon's-seal, Polygonatum biflorum
- Adam's needle, Yucca flaccida

Iridaceae

- Dwarf crested iris, Iris cristata
- Narrow-leaf blue-eyed-grass, Sisyrinchium angustifolium

Orchidaceae

- Dragon's mouth orchid, Arethusa bulbosa
- Tuberous grass pink, Calopogon tuberosus
- Rosebud orchid, Cleistesiopsis divaricata
- Crane-fly orchid, Tipularia discolor

== Liliales ==
Colchicaceae

- Perfoliate bellwort, Uvularia perfoliata

Liliaceae

- Yellow trout lily, Erythronium americanum
- Catesby's lily, Lilium catesbaei
- Carolina lily, Lilium michauxii
- Sandhills lily, Lilium pyrophilum
- Turk's cap lily, Lilium superbum

Melanthiaceae

- Painted trillium, Trillium undulatum

Smilacaceae

- Cat greenbriar, Smilax glauca

== Arecales ==
Arecaceae

- Cabbage palmetto, Sabal palmetto
- Dwarf palmetto, Sabal minor

== Commelinales ==
Commelinaceae

- White mouth dayflower, Commelina erecta

== Poales ==
Poaceae

- Japanese stiltgrass, Microstegium vimineum (I)
- Torpedograss, Panicum repens (I)
- Dallis grass, Paspalum dilatatum (I)

== Ranunculales ==
Berberidaceae

- American barberry, Berberis canadensis
- Mayapple, Podophyllum peltatum

Ranunculaceae

- Rue anemone, Thalictrum thalictroides

== Proteales ==
Platanaceae

- American sycamore, Platanus occidentalis

== Saxifragales ==
Altingiaceae

- Sweetgum, Liquidambar styraciflua

== Vitales ==
Vitaceae

- Muscadine, Vitis rotundifolia

== Oxalidales ==
Oxalidaceae

- Great yellow woodsorrel, Oxalis grandis
- Violet wood-sorrel, Oxalis violacea

== Malpighiales ==
Passifloraceae

- Yellow passionflower, Passiflora lutea

Salicaceae

- Eastern cottonwood, Populus deltoides
- Swamp cottonwood, Populus heterophylla
- White Willow, Salix alba (I)
- Weeping willow, Salix babylonica (I)
- Carolina willow, Salix caroliniana
- Black willow, Salix nigra

Violaceae

- American field pansy, Viola bicolor
- Canada violet, Viola canadensis
- Halberd-leaved yellow violet, Viola hastata
- Sweet violet, Viola odorata (I)
- Bird's-foot violet, Viola pedata
- Common blue violet, Viola sororia

== Fabales ==
Fabaceae

- Redbud, Cercis canadensis
- Honey locust, Gleditsia triacanthos
- Chinese bushclover, Lespedeza cuneata (I)
- Kudzu, Pueraria montana (I)
- Black locust, Robinia pseudoacacia
- Pink fuzzybean, Strophostyles umbellata
- White clover, Trifolium repens (I)
- American wisteria, Wisteria frutescens

== Rosales ==
Cannabaceae

- Sugarberry, Celtis laevigata
- Hackberry, Celtis occidentalis

Moraceae

- Red mulberry, Morus rubra

Rosaceae

- Serviceberry, Amelanchier arborea
- Carolina laurelcherry, Prunus caroliniana
- Pin cherry, Prunus pensylvanica
- Black cherry, Prunus serotina
- Carolina rose, Rosa carolina

Ulmaceae

- Winged elm, Ulmus alata
- American elm, Ulmus americana
- Slippery Elm, Ulmus rubra

== Fagales ==
Betulaceae

- Yellow birch, Betula alleghaniensis
- Sweet birch, Betula lenta
- River birch, Betula nigra
- Hornbeam, Carpinus caroliniana
- Eastern hop hornbeam, Ostrya virginiana

Fagaceae

- American chestnut, Castanea dentata
- Chinkapin, Castanea pumila
- American beech, Fagus grandifolia
- White oak, Quercus alba
- Scarlet oak, Quercus coccinea
- Southern red oak, Quercus falcata
- Turkey oak, Quercus laevis
- Overcup oak, Quercus lyrata
- Blackjack oak, Quercus marilandica
- Swamp chestnut oak, Quercus michauxii
- Chestnut oak, Quercus montana
- Water oak, Quercus nigra
- Cherrybark oak, Quercus pagoda
- Pin oak, Quercus palustris
- Willow oak, Quercus phellos
- Northern red oak, Quercus rubra
- Post oak, Quercus stellata
- Black oak, Quercus velutina
- Live oak, Quercus virginiana

Juglandaceae

- Bitternut hickory, Carya cordiformis
- Pignut hickory, Carya glabra
- Pecan, Carya illinoinensis (I)
- Shagbark hickory, Carya ovata
- Mockernut hickory, Carya tomentosa
- Black walnut, Juglans nigra

Myricaceae

- Southern wax myrtle, Myrica cerifera

== Myrtales ==
Onagraceae

- Pinkladies, Oenothera speciosa

== Sapindales ==
Anacardiaceae

- Staghorn sumac, Rhus typhina
- Poison ivy, Toxicodendron radicans
- Poison sumac, Toxicodendron vernix

Sapindaceae

- Boxelder, Acer negundo
- Red maple, Acer rubrum
- Sugar maple, Acer saccharum
- Yellow buckeye, Aesculus flava

== Malvales ==
Malvaceae

- Seashore mallow, Kosteletzkya virginica
- American basswood, Tilia americana

== Brassicales ==
Brassicaceae

- Virginia pepperweed, Lepidium virginicum

== Caryophyllales ==
Cactaceae

- Eastern prickly pear, Opuntia humifusa

Droseraceae

- Venus flytrap, Dionaea muscipula

Montiaceae

- Carolina springbeauty, Claytonia carolinian
- Virginia springbeauty, Claytonia virginica

Phytolaccaceae

- American pokeweed, Phytolacca americana

Portulacaceae

- Kiss-me-quick, Portulaca pilosa

== Cornales ==
Cornaceae

- Silky dogwood, Cornus amomum
- Flowering dogwood, Cornus florida
- Stiff dogwood, Cornus foemina

Hydrangeaceae

- Smooth hydrangea, Hydrangea arborescens
- Silverleaf hydrangea, Hydrangea radiata

Nyssaceae

- Water tupelo, Nyssa aquatica
- Blackgum, Nyssa sylvatica

== Ericales ==
Ebenaceae

- Common persimmon, Diospyros virginiana

Ericaceae

- Whitewicky, Kalmia cuneata
- Mountain laurel, Kalmia latifolia
- Indian pipe, Monotropa uniflora
- Sourwood, Oxydendrum arboreum
- Flame azalea, Rhododendron calendulaceum
- Pinxter flower, Rhododendron periclymenoides
- Northern highbush blueberry, Vaccinium corymbosum
- Creeping blueberry, Vaccinium crassifolium
- Deerberry, Vaccinium stamineum
- Honeycup, Zenobia pulverulenta

Primulaceae

- Shooting star, Primula meadia

Theaceae

- Loblolly-bay, Gordonia lasianthus

Sarraceniaceae

- Yellow pitcherplant, Sarracenia flava
- Hooded pitcherplant, Sarracenia minor
- Purple pitcher plant, Sarracenia purpurea
- Sweet pitcherplant, Sarracenia rubra

Styracaceae

- Carolina silverbell, Halesia carolina

== Gentianales ==
Apocynaceae

- Hemp dogbane, Apocynum cannabinum
- Butterfly weed, Asclepias tuberosa

Asclepiadaceae

- Common milkweed, Asclepias syriaca

Gelsemiaceae

- Yellow jessamine, Gelsemium sempervirens

Gentianaceae

- Rosepink, Sabatia angularis

Rubiaceae

- Azure bluet, Houstonia caerulea

== Solanales ==
Solanaceae

- Jimsonweed, Datura stramonium

Convolvulaceae

- Common morning-glory, Ipomoea purpurea (I)

== Lamiales ==
Acanthaceae

- American water-willow, Justicia americana
- Carolina wild petunia, Ruellia caroliniensis

Bignoniaceae

- Trumpet vine, Campsis radicans

Lamiaceae

- Ground-ivy, Glechoma hederacea (I)
- Lyre-leaf sage, Salvia lyrata

Lentibulariaceae

- Southern bladderwort, Utricularia juncea

Oleaceae

- White ash, Fraxinus americana
- Carolina ash, Fraxinus caroliniana
- Green ash, Fraxinus pennsylvanica

Orobanchaceae

- Scarlet painted-cup, Castilleja coccinea

Phrymaceae

- Allegheny monkeyflower, Mimulus ringens

Scrophulariaceae

- Common mullein, Verbascum thapsus (I)

== Aquifoliales ==
Aquifoliaceae

- American holly, Ilex opaca

== Asterales ==
Asteraceae

- Giant ragweed, Ambrosia trifida
- Common daisy, Bellis perennis (I)
- Woolly elephant's foot, Elephantopus tomentosus
- Dogfennel, Eupatorium capillifolium
- Sweetscented joe pye weed, Eutrochium purpureum
- Ox-eye daisy, Leucanthemum vulgare (I)
- Tall goldenrod, Solidago gigantea

Campanulaceae

- Cardinal flower, Lobelia cardinalis
- Indian tobacco, Lobelia inflata

== Apiales ==
Apiaceae

- Queen Anne's lace, Daucus carota (I)
- Golden alexanders, Zizia aurea

== Dipsacales ==
Caprifoliaceae

- Japanese honeysuckle, Lonicera japonica (I)
