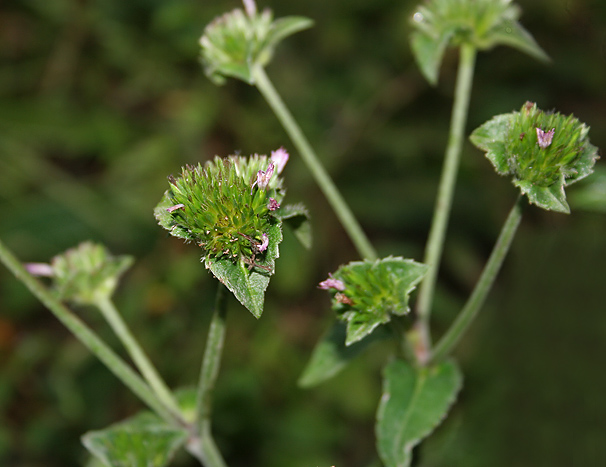
- Elephantopus scaber in India

Scientific classification
- Kingdom: Plantae
- Clade: Tracheophytes
- Clade: Angiosperms
- Clade: Eudicots
- Clade: Asterids
- Order: Asterales
- Family: Asteraceae
- Genus: Elephantopus
- Species: E. scaber

Binomial name
- Elephantopus scaber L.

Synonyms
- Elephantopus carolinensis G.Mey.; Elephantopus sordidus Salisb.; Scabiosa cochinchinensis Lour.; Elephantopus plurisetus (O.Hoffm.) Clonts, syn of subsp. plurisetus; Elephantopus sinuatus Zoll. & Moritzi, syn of var. sinuatus; Asterocephalus cochinchinensis Sprengel

= Elephantopus scaber =

Species of flowering plant

Elephantopus scaber is a tropical species of flowering plant in the family Asteraceae. It is native to tropical Africa, Eastern Asia, Indian subcontinent, Southeast Asia, and northern Australia. It has become naturalized in tropical Africa and Latin America. Its natural habitat is subtropical or tropical moist montane forests.

== Uses ==
Elephantopus scaber is used as a traditional medicine. Different parts of the plant are used in traditional medicine of India as an astringent agent, cardiac tonic, and diuretic, and is used for eczema, rheumatism, fever, and bladder stones. E. scaber modulates inflammatory responses by inhibiting the production of TNFα and IL-1β.

== Etymology ==
The genus name Elephantopus comes from the Greek words "elephantos" (elephant) and "pous" (foot). The term likely refers to the large basal leaves of some members of the genus.

== Chemical constituents ==
Elephantopus scaber contains elephantopin which is a germacranolide sesquiterpene lactone containing two lactone rings and an epoxide functional group. 17,19-Dihydrodeoxyelephantopin, iso-17,19- dihydro-deoxy elephantopin and 8-hydroxyl naringenin are the most important bioactive compounds responsible for anti-bacterial activity. By UPLC MS Q-TOF, 34 components were identified.

== Subspecies and varieties ==
Varieties of E. scaber include:

- Elephantopus scaber subsp. plurisetus (O.Hoffm.) Philipson
- Elephantopus scaber subsp. scaber
- Elephantopus scaber var. scaber
- Elephantopus scaber var. sinuatus (Mor.) Miq.
