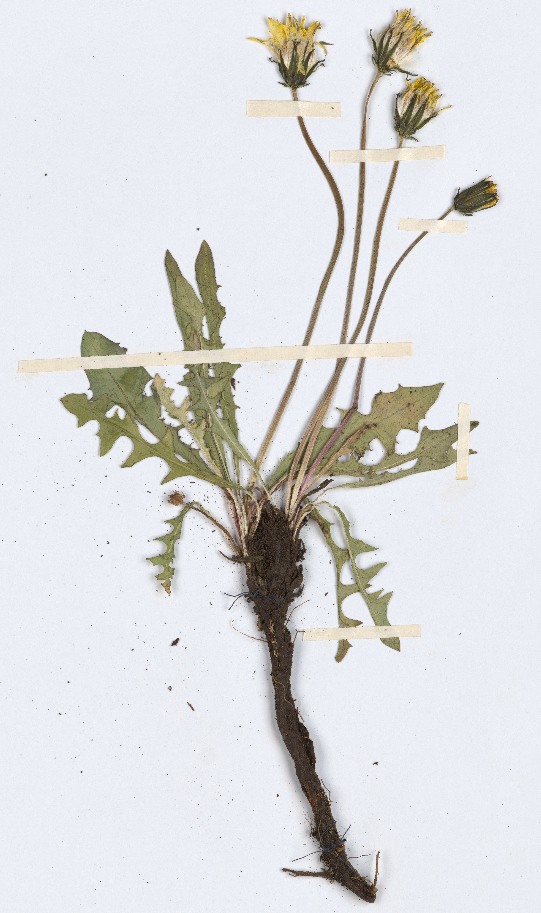

Scientific classification
- Kingdom: Plantae
- Clade: Tracheophytes
- Clade: Angiosperms
- Clade: Eudicots
- Clade: Asterids
- Order: Asterales
- Family: Asteraceae
- Genus: Taraxacum
- Species: T. bicorne

Binomial name
- Taraxacum bicorne Dahlst.

= Taraxacum bicorne =

Species of flowering plant

Taraxacum bicorne, commonly known as the two-horned dandelion or Russian dandelion, is a perennial species of dandelion native to Central Asia, the western Himalaya, and the Russian Far East. It primarily inhabits temperate biomes and occurs in regions such as Kazakhstan, Kyrgyzstan, and parts of western China, including Gansu, Qinghai, and Xinjiang. The species was first formally described in 1906 by Swedish botanist Gustaf Dahlstedt in Arkiv för Botanik. In Chinese, it is referred to as 双角蒲公英 (shuang jiao pu gong ying).

== Description ==
Taraxacum bicorne is a small, herbaceous plant typically ranging from 4 to 17 cm in height. Its leaves are glabrous and glaucous green, with narrowly winged pale green petioles and pinkish midveins. The leaf blades are narrowly oblanceolate to narrowly oblong and exhibit a pinnatilobed to pinnatifid structure. There are generally four to five pairs of lateral lobes, which are commonly deltoid or falcate in shape. The terminal lobe is either triangular or divided into three parts. The scapes, which are often longer than the leaves, are purplish or brownish green in color.

The flower head (capitulum) measures 2–3 cm in diameter and is surrounded by an involucre 5–8 mm wide. It bears 9–14 outer phyllaries, often tinged with purple and featuring suberect horns up to 2 mm long. The ligules are light yellow, with the outer ones displaying brownish-purple stripes on the reverse. The plant produces fertile anthers and uniformly sized pollen grains. The achenes are light grayish straw-colored, measuring 3.7–4.2 mm in length, and have a subconical cone and spinulose upper surface. The beak is 7–9 mm long, and the pappus is bright white, measuring 5–6 mm.

Flowering occurs in late spring and early summer. The species is sexual and is typically found in subsaline pastures and grasslands at elevations between 600 and 1800 meters.

== Distribution and habitat ==
Taraxacum bicorne is native to a broad region across Central and northern Asia, encompassing a range of temperate habitats. Its distribution includes China (notably in North-Central provinces such as Gansu, Qinghai, and Xinjiang), as well as Inner Mongolia and the western Himalaya. Beyond China, the species is also native to Kazakhstan, Kyrgyzstan, Tajikistan, Turkmenistan, Uzbekistan, and Mongolia. In the Russian Far East, it has been recorded in Amur, Khabarovsk, Magadan, and Primorye.

The species typically inhabits open, temperate environments such as subsaline pastures and grasslands. It is commonly found at elevations ranging from 600 to 1800 meters, where it grows in soils that may be mineral-rich or slightly saline. These ecological conditions suggest an adaptability to both steppe and montane grassland ecosystems, often under full sunlight and with limited competition from taller vegetation.

== Economic importance ==
Taraxacum bicorne is closely related to Taraxacum kok-saghyz, a species historically cultivated for rubber production. While T. bicorne yields roughly half the amount of rubber produced by T. kok-saghyz, it exhibits notable genetic variability and a broader ecological tolerance. These characteristics make it a valuable genetic resource for breeding programs aimed at improving rubber yield and adaptability in related species.

Additionally, the sesquiterpene lactone glycosides sonchuside and vernoflexuoside—classified as germacranolide and guaianolide types, respectively—have been isolated from the roots of Taraxacum bicorne, contributing to its phytochemical and potential pharmacological significance.
