= Parthenolide =

Names
- IUPAC name (1aR,4E,7aS,10aS,10bR)-2,3,6,7,7a,8,10a,10b-octahydro-1a,5-dimethyl-8-methylene-oxireno[9,10]cyclodeca[1,2-b]furan-9(1aH)-one

Identifiers
| CAS Number | 20554-84-1 |
| 3D model (JSmol) | Interactive image |
| ChEMBL | ChEMBL540445 |
| ChemSpider | 20126246 |
| ECHA InfoCard | 100.220.558 |
| PubChem CID | 5420805 |
| RTECS number | LY4220000 |
| UNII | 2RDB26I5ZB |
| CompTox Dashboard (EPA) | DTXSID2040579 |
- InChI: InChI=1S/C15H20O3/c1-9-5-4-8-15(3)13(18-15)12-11(7-6-9)10(2)14(16)17-12/h5,11-13H,2,4,6-8H2,1,3H3/b9-5+/t11-,12-,13-,15+/m0/s1 Key: KTEXNACQROZXEV-SLXBATTESA-N; Key: KTEXNACQROZXEV-SLXBATTEBY; InChI=1/C15H20O3/c1-9-5-4-8-15(3)13(18-15)12-11(7-6-9)10(2)14(16)17-12/h5,11-13H,2,4,6-8H2,1,3H3/b9-5+/t11-,12-,13-,15+/m0/s1
- SMILES: C/C/1=C\CC[C@@]2([C@@H](O2)[C@@H]3[C@@H](CC1)C(=C)C(=O)O3)C

Properties
| Chemical formula | C_{15}H_{20}O_{3} |
| Molar mass | 248.322 g·mol^{−1} |
| Melting point | 113 to 115 °C (235 to 239 °F; 386 to 388 K) |
- Except where otherwise noted, data are given for materials in their standard state (at 25 °C [77 °F], 100 kPa). verify (what is ?) Infobox references

Parthenolide is a sesquiterpene lactone of the germacranolide class which occurs naturally in the plant feverfew (Tanacetum parthenium), after which it is named, and in the closely related tansy (Tanacetum vulgare). It is found in highest concentration in the flowers and fruit. Parthenolide's molecular structure depiction is often incorrect regarding the stereochemistry of the epoxide, although X-ray single crystal structures are available.

Lack of solubility in water and bioavailability limits the potential of parthenolide as a drug.
