= Elephantopin =

Names
- IUPAC name (1aR,8S,8aR,11aS,11bR)-1a-Methyl-9-methylene-5,10-dioxo-2,3,5,7,8,8a,9,10,11a,11b-decahydro-1aH-3,6-(metheno)furo[2,3-f]oxireno[2,3-d][1]oxacycloundecin-8-yl methacrylate

Identifiers
CAS Number	13017-11-3
3D model (JSmol)	Interactive image
ChEMBL	ChEMBL400927
ChemSpider	62877965
PubChem CID	264743
UNII	4W3GHK54A3
CompTox Dashboard (EPA)	DTXSID20875136
- InChI: InChI=1S/C19H20O7/c1-8(2)16(20)24-12-6-10-5-11(23-18(10)22)7-19(4)15(26-19)14-13(12)9(3)17(21)25-14/h5,11-15H,1,3,6-7H2,2,4H3/t11-,12-,13+,14-,15?,19?/m0/s1 Key: WIQOUTANBFOBPB-WILRRUMQSA-N
- SMILES: O=C1C(C[C@H](OC(C(C)=C)=O)[C@@]23[H])=CC(O1)C[C@]4(C)[C@H](O4)[C@@]3([H])OC(C2=C)=O

Properties
Chemical formula	C_{19}H_{20}O_{7}
Molar mass	360.362 g·mol^{−1}
- Except where otherwise noted, data are given for materials in their standard state (at 25 °C [77 °F], 100 kPa). verify (what is ?) Infobox references

Elephantopin is a natural chemical compound extracted from the Elephantopus elatus plant of the genus Elephantopus, family Compositae. It is a sesquiterpene lactone with a germacranolide skeleton, containing two lactone rings and an epoxide functional group.
