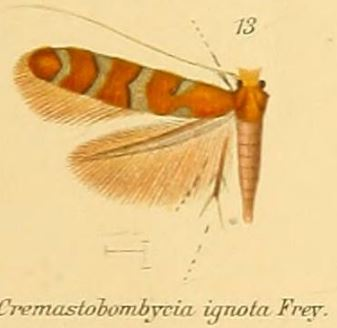

Scientific classification
- Kingdom: Animalia
- Phylum: Arthropoda
- Clade: Pancrustacea
- Class: Insecta
- Order: Lepidoptera
- Family: Gracillariidae
- Genus: Cremastobombycia
- Species: C. ignota

Binomial name
- Cremastobombycia ignota (Frey & Boll, 1873)

Synonyms
- Lithocolletis ignota Frey & Boll, 1873; Cremastobombycia actinomeridis (Frey & Boll, 1878); Cremastobombycia bostonica (Frey & Boll, 1873); Cremastobombycia elephantopodella (Frey & Boll, 1878); Cremastobombycia heleanithivorella (Chambers, 1878); Cremastobombycia heleanthivorella (Walsingham, 1889); Cremastobombycia helianthisella (Chambers, 1874); Cremastobombycia helianthivorella (Chambers, 1875); Cremastobombycia hilianthivorella (Chambers, 1875)

= Cremastobombycia ignota =

Species of moth

Cremastobombycia ignota is a moth of the family Gracillariidae. It is known from Illinois, Texas, Kentucky, Maine, New York, Massachusetts, Washington and Ohio in the United States.

The wingspan is 6.5-7.5 mm.

The larvae feed on Elephantopus species (including Elephantopus carolinianus), Helianthus species (including Helianthus annuus and Helianthus giganteus), Ridania alternifolia, Verbesina species (including Verbesina alternifolia and Verbesina virginica). They mine the leaves of their host plant.
