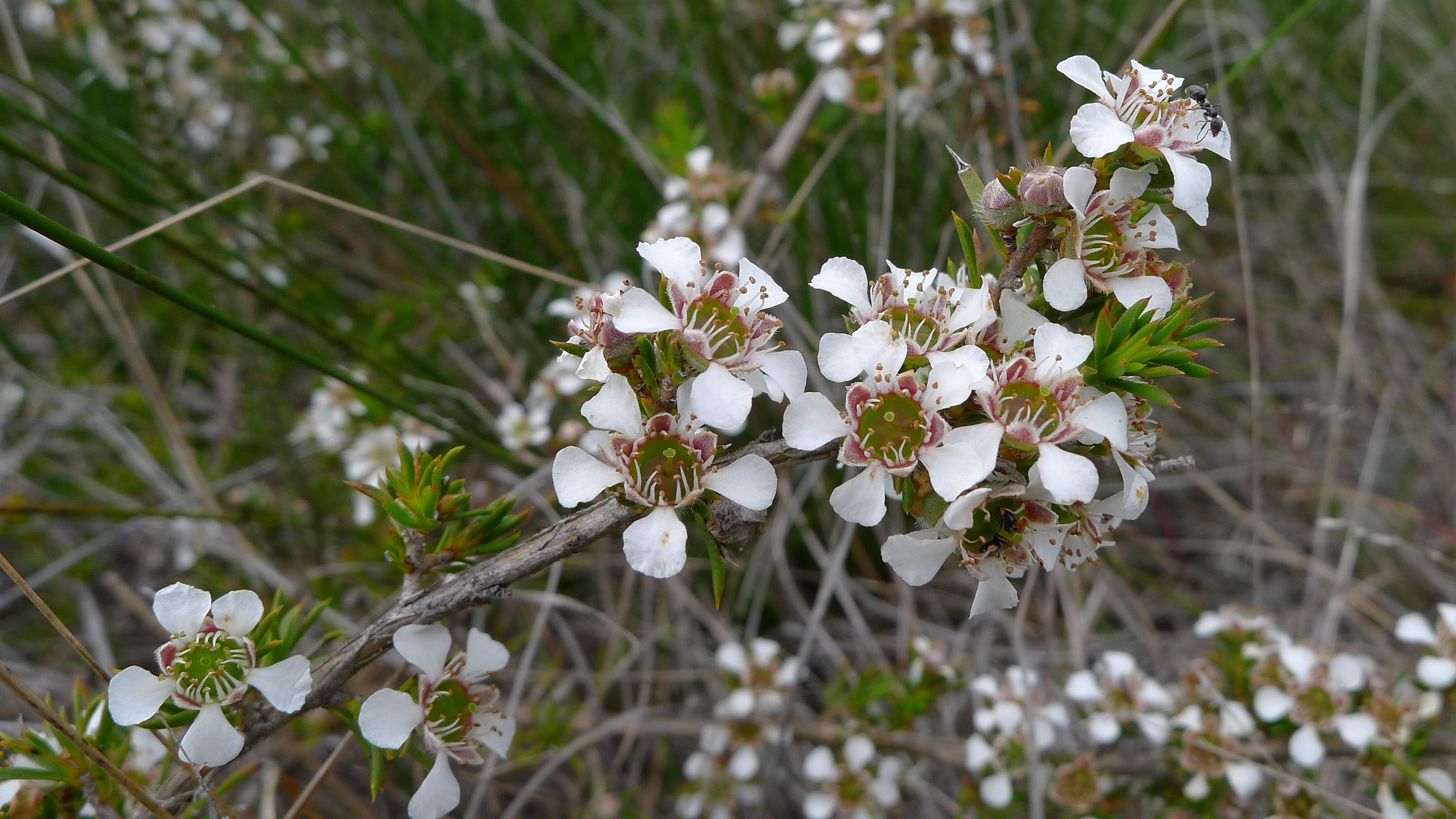
- Flowers of Leptospermum arachnoides in the Royal National Park

Scientific classification
- Kingdom: Plantae
- Clade: Tracheophytes
- Clade: Angiosperms
- Clade: Eudicots
- Clade: Rosids
- Order: Myrtales
- Family: Myrtaceae
- Genus: Leptospermum
- Species: L. arachnoides

Binomial name
- Leptospermum arachnoides Gaertn.
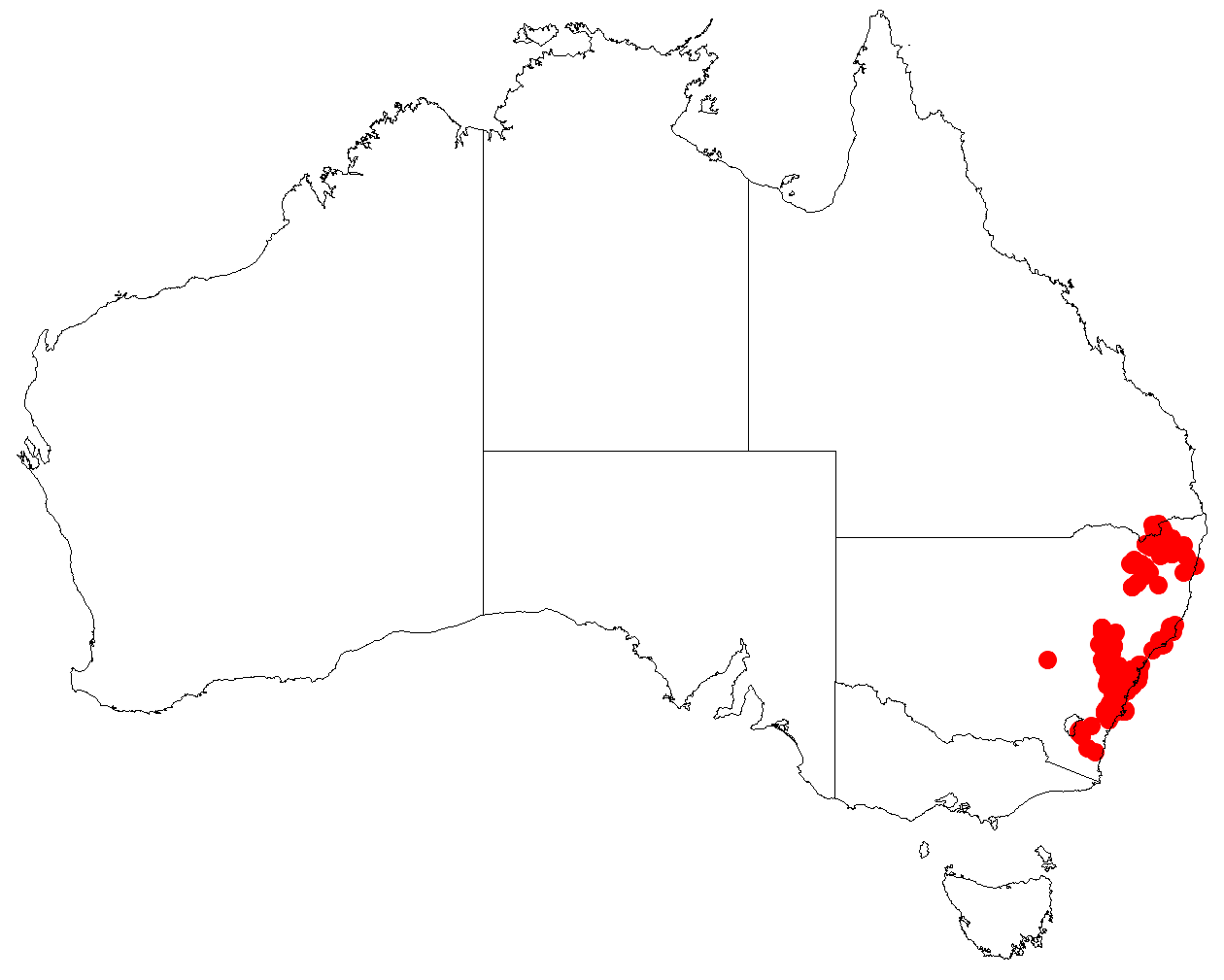
- Occurrence data from AVH

Synonyms
- Leptospermum arachnoideum Sm. nom. illeg.; Leptospermum baccatum Sm.; Leptospermum baccatum Sm. var. baccatum; Leptospermum juniperifolium Cav.; Leptospermum triloculare Vent.; Melaleuca arachnoidea Raeusch. nom. inval., nom. nud.

= Leptospermum arachnoides =

Spidery tea-tree

Australian species of plant

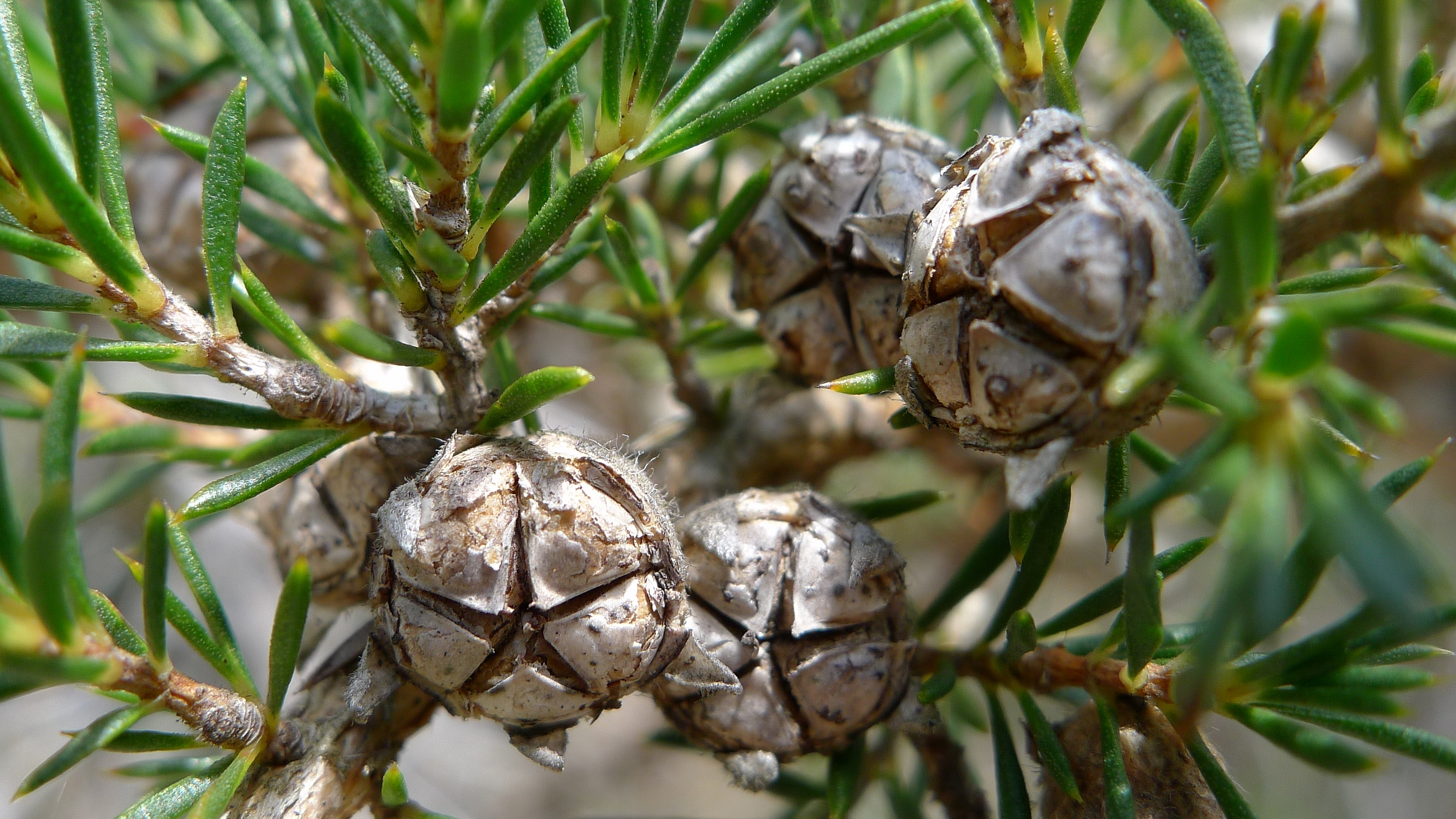
Fruit

Leptospermum arachnoides, commonly known as the spidery tea-tree, is a species of shrub that is endemic to eastern Australia. It has rough bark, crowded linear to lance-shaped leaves with a sharp point on the end, white flowers and hairy fruit.

== Description ==
Leptospermum arachnoides is a slender, spreading shrub that typically grows to 1–2 m (3 ft 3 in – 6 ft 7 in) high and 1.5 m (4 ft 11 in) wide and has rough, peeling, flaky bark. The leaves are linear to lance-shaped or elliptical, mostly 10–20 mm (0.39–0.79 in) long, 1–3 mm (0.039–0.118 in) wide, concave in cross-section, with a sharp point on the end and on a very short but broad petiole. The flowers are borne singly in leaf axils and are 8–10 mm (0.31–0.39 in) in diameter with a hairy floral cup about 2 mm (0.079 in) long. The sepals are about 2 mm (0.079 in) long and hairy, the petals about 4 mm (0.16 in) long and white, the stamens are about 2 mm (0.079 in) long. Flowering occurs from November to January and the fruit is a hairy capsule 5–8 mm (0.20–0.31 in) in diameter.

== Taxonomy and naming ==
Leptospermum arachnoides was first formally described in 1788 by Joseph Gaertner in his book De Fructibus et Seminibus Plantarum. The specific epithet (‘’arachnoides’’) is derived from Latin, meaning "resembling a spider".

== Distribution and habitat ==
Spidery tea-tree grows in moist heath and sclerophyll forest, usually on shallow soils derived from sandstone and granite. It occurs between south-east Queensland and the Tinderry Range in New South Wales.
