= C19H20O7 =

The molecular formula C_{19}H_{20}O_{7} (molar mass: 360.362 g/mol) may refer to:

- Barbatic acid
- Elephantopin
