= Coleophora laevipennis =

Scientific classification
- Kingdom: Animalia
- Phylum: Arthropoda
- Class: Insecta
- Order: Lepidoptera
- Family: Coleophoridae
- Genus: Coleophora
- Species: C. laevipennis

Binomial name
- Coleophora laevipennis Toll & Amsel, 1967

Species of moth

Coleophora laevipennis is a moth of the family Coleophoridae. It is found in Afghanistan.

The larvae feed on Cousinia congesta, Acroptilon repens and Inula grandis. They feed on the leaves of their host plant.
