= Elephantopus (disambiguation) =

Elephantopus may refer to:

- Elephantopus, a genus of perennials in the daisy family
- Testudo elephantopus, Chelonoidis elephantopus or Geochelone elephantopus, the Pinta Island tortoise a species (now sometimes considered a sub-species) of Galápagos tortoise; also used to refer to Galápagos tortoises Testudo nigra as a whole
- Pachyornis elephantopus, the heavy-footed moa, a species of moa from the family Dinornithidae
