= Hardheads =

Hardheads is a common name for several organisms and may refer to:

== Animals ==
- Aythya australis, a species of duck
- Micropogonias undulatus, a species of fish

== Plants ==
- Acroptilon repens
- Centaurea nigra
