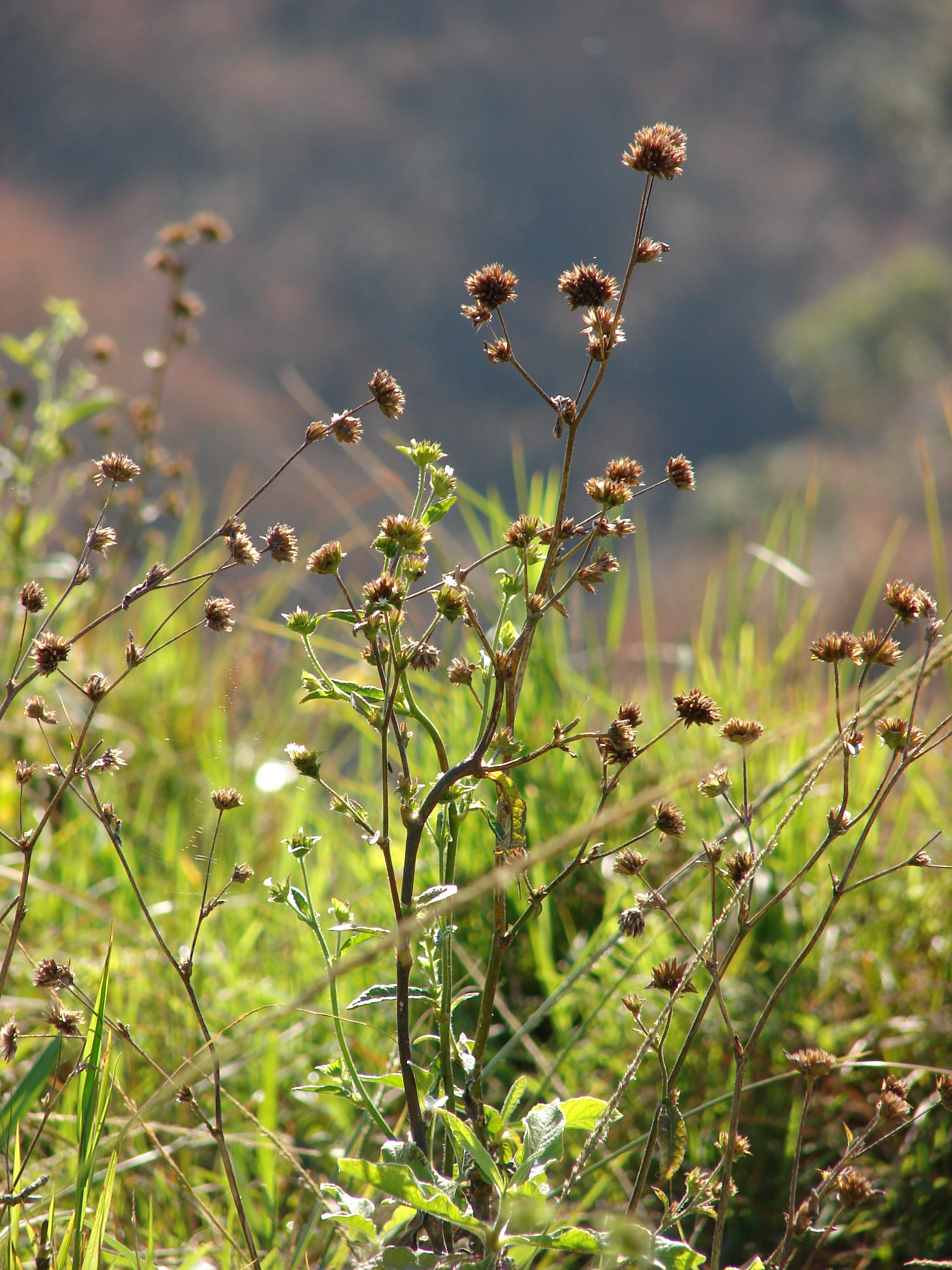

Scientific classification
- Kingdom: Plantae
- Clade: Tracheophytes
- Clade: Angiosperms
- Clade: Eudicots
- Clade: Asterids
- Order: Asterales
- Family: Asteraceae
- Genus: Elephantopus
- Species: E. mollis

Binomial name
- Elephantopus mollis Kunth

Synonyms
- Elephantopus cernuus Vell.; Elephantopus hypomalacus S.F.Blake; Elephantopus martii Graham; Elephantopus pilosus Philip.

= Elephantopus mollis =

Species of flowering plant

Elephantopus mollis, common names tobacco weed, and soft elephantsfoot, is a tropical species of flowering plant in the family Asteraceae.

Elephantopus mollis is native to South America as far south as Jujuy Province in Argentina, as well as the West Indies, Central America, and Mexico as far north as Tamaulipas and Nuevo León. It is also naturalized in Australia, south-eastern Asia, some Pacific Islands, and tropical Africa. The species is considered a noxious weed some places.

Elephantopus mollis is a coarse perennial herb up to 20 cm (8 inches) tall. Leaves are dark green on the upper side, lighter green on the lower surface, oblanceolate to elliptical, up to 22 cm (9 inches) long. The plant produces arrays of small flower heads, each with only 4 white or pink florets.

== Etymology ==
The genus name Elephantopus comes from the Greek words "elephantos" (elephant) and "pous" (foot). The term likely refers to the large basal leaves of some members of the genus.
