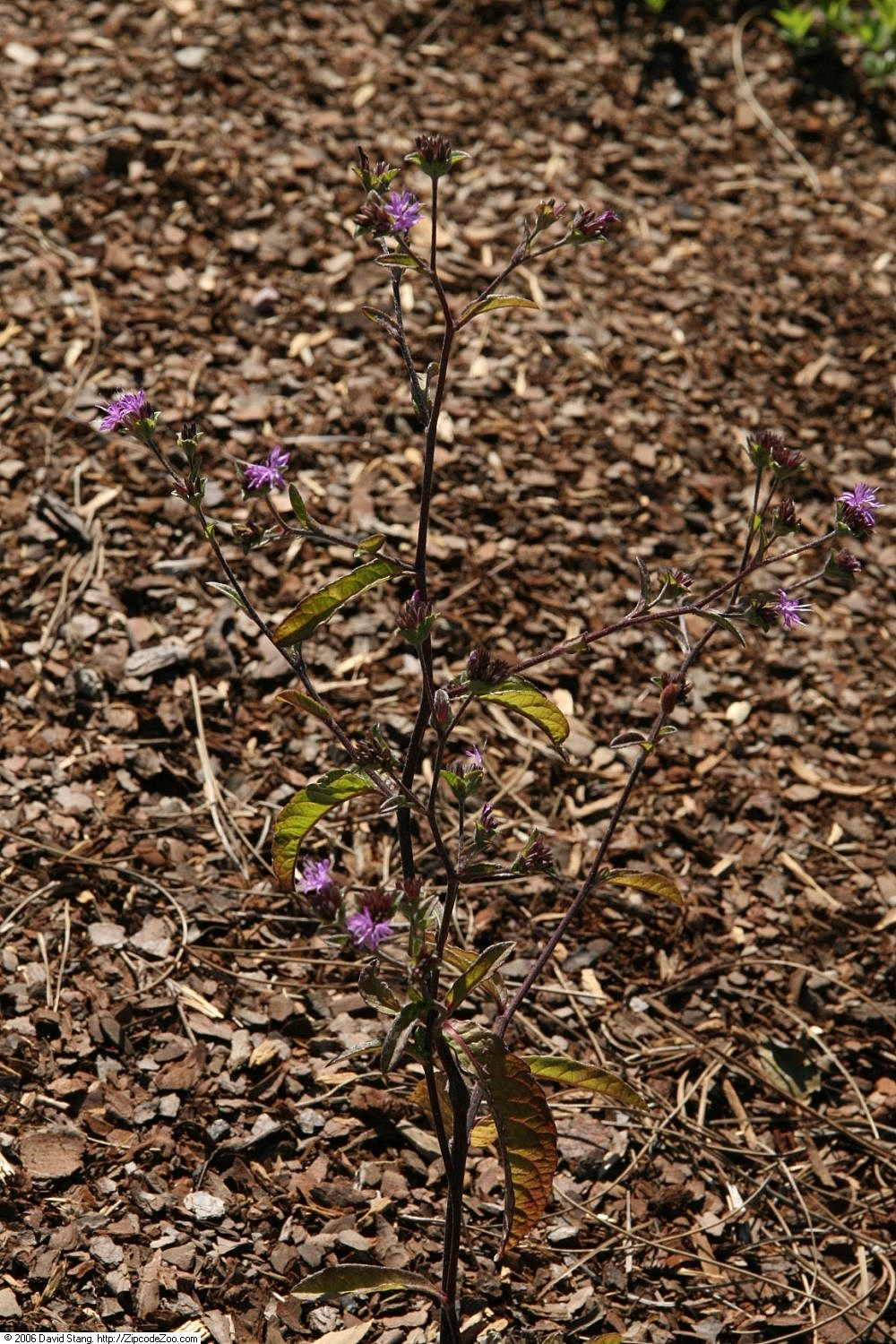

Scientific classification
- Kingdom: Plantae
- Clade: Tracheophytes
- Clade: Angiosperms
- Clade: Eudicots
- Clade: Asterids
- Order: Asterales
- Family: Asteraceae
- Genus: Elephantopus
- Species: E. nudatus

Binomial name
- Elephantopus nudatus A.Gray

= Elephantopus nudatus =

Species of flowering plant

Elephantopus nudatus, common name smooth elephantsfoot, is a North American species of flowering plant in the family Asteraceae. It is native to the southeastern United States from eastern Texas to Delaware.

== Description ==
Elephantopus nudatus is a perennial herb up to 110 cm (44 inches) tall. Leaves are oblanceolate to spatulate, up to 20 cm (8 inches) long, darker on the upper side than they are on the lower side.

The plant produces numerous small flower heads in a tight cluster, each head generally containing only 4-5 florets. It has been observed to flower from late July into September.

== Etymology ==
The genus name Elephantopus comes from the Greek words "elephantos" (elephant) and "pous" (foot). The term likely refers to the large basal leaves of some members of the genus.

== Habitat ==
E. nudatus is classified as a facultative species, meaning that it can be found in both wetland and non-wetland environments. Within its native range, this species is commonly found in dry woodlands and along woodland borders. It has also been observed in habitat types such as hammocks, longleaf pine-wiregrass savannas, mesic flatwoods, and floodplains.

This species has been found to increase in foliage biomass as a response to disturbances such as fire or clearcutting.
