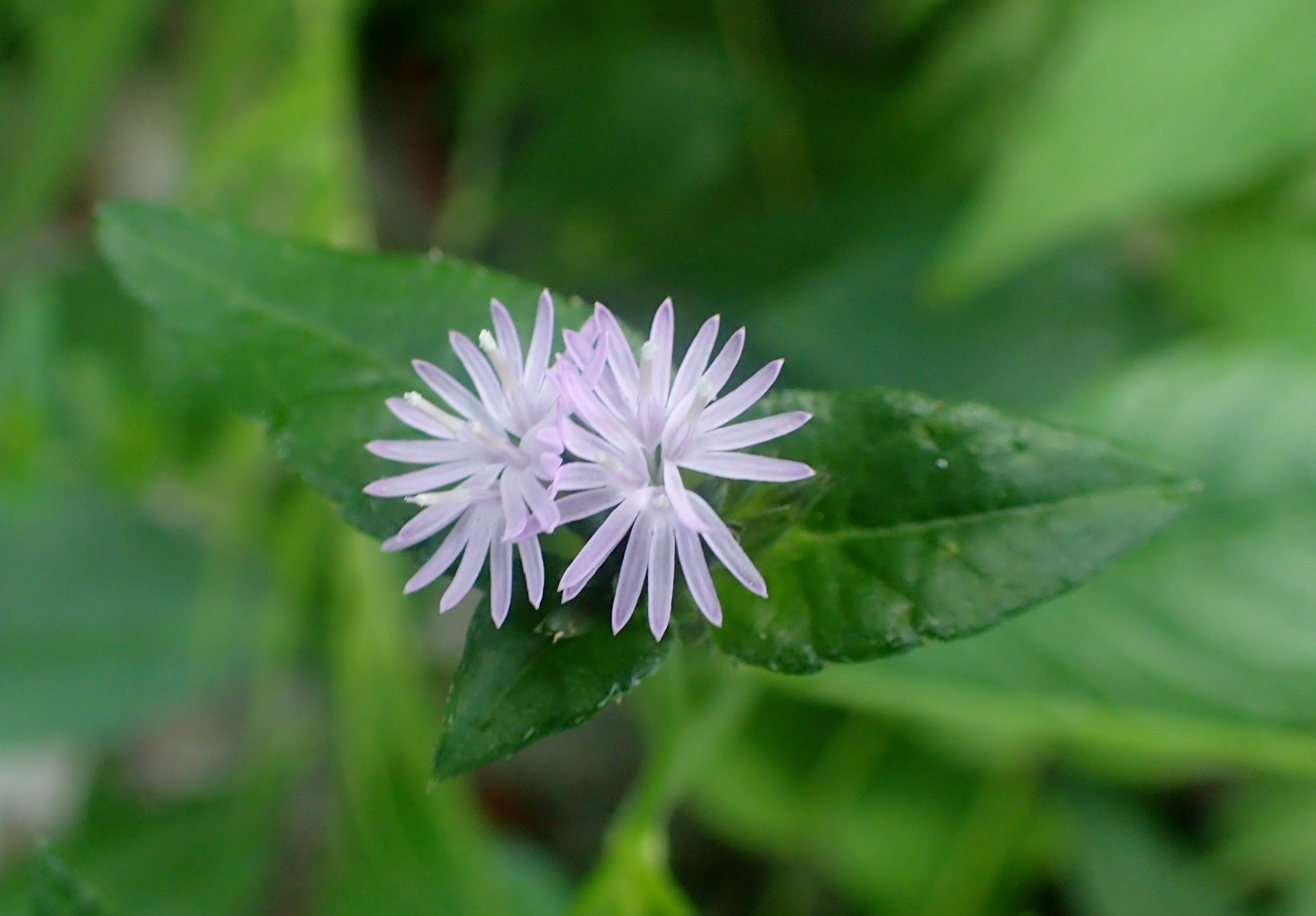

Conservation status
- Secure (NatureServe)

Scientific classification
- Kingdom: Plantae
- Clade: Tracheophytes
- Clade: Angiosperms
- Clade: Eudicots
- Clade: Asterids
- Order: Asterales
- Family: Asteraceae
- Genus: Elephantopus
- Species: E. carolinianus

Binomial name
- Elephantopus carolinianus Raeusch. 1797 not Willd. 1803

Synonyms
- Elephantopus flexuosus Raf.

= Elephantopus carolinianus =

Species of flowering plant

Elephantopus carolinianus, with the common names Carolina elephantsfoot or leafy elephant's foot, is a species of flowering plant in the Asteraceae family. It is native to the south-central and southeastern United States.

== Description ==
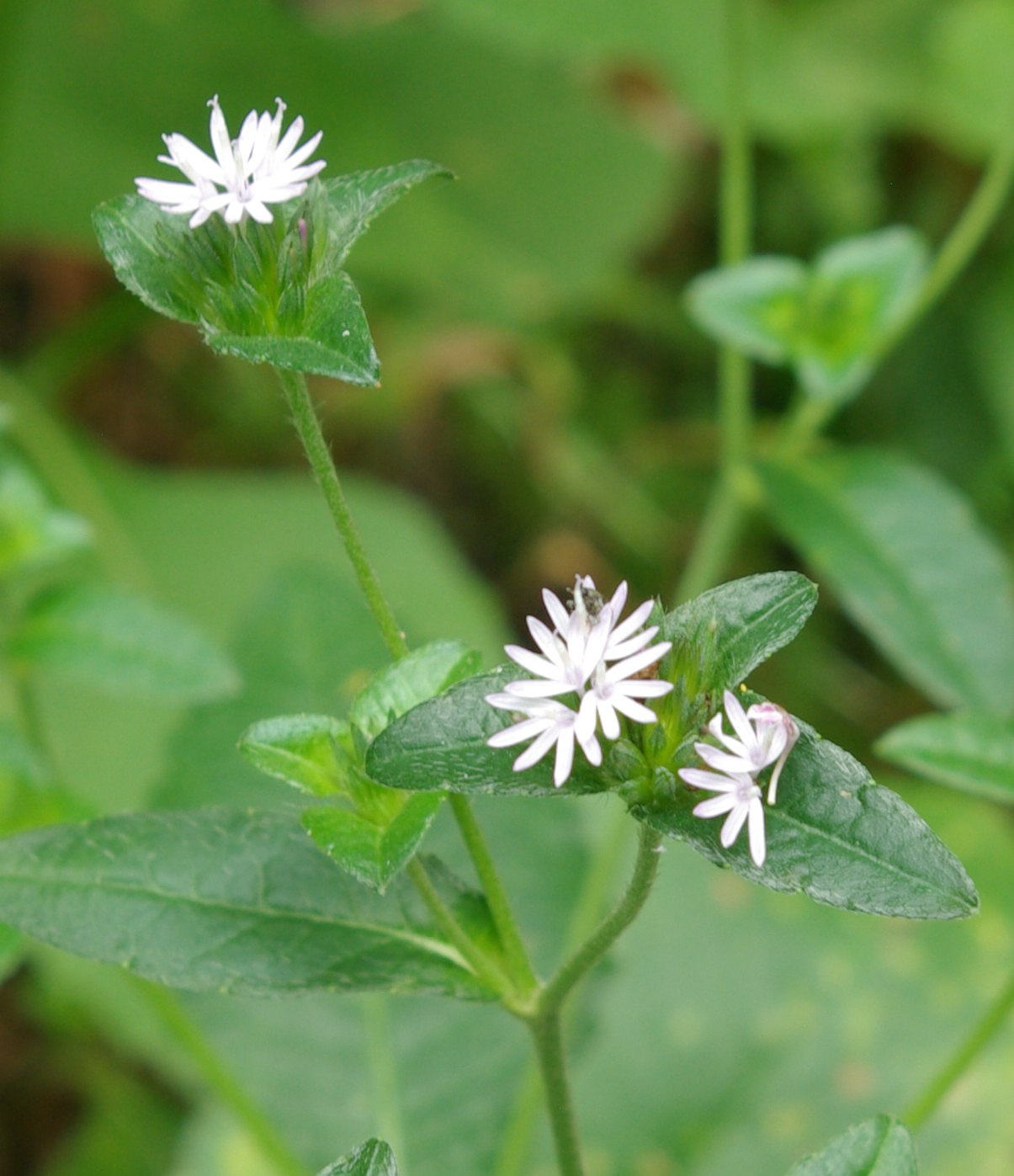
Elephantopus carolinianus in Arkansas

Elephantopus carolinianus is a perennial herb sometimes as much as 120 cm (4 feet) tall. Leaves are elliptic or ovate to lanceolate, up to 12 cm (5 inches) long, larger toward the base of the plant and decreasing in size moving up the stem. The leaves are darker on the upper side than they are on the lower side and are lightly hairy. They are alternate along the stem, becoming spaced further apart higher on the stem. At the plant's base, the leaves are very close together, as close as 0.6 centimetres (.25 in) apart.

The plant produces numerous small flower heads in a tight cluster, each head generally containing only 4-5 florets. The cluster of flower heads is supported by 3 bracts that resemble leaves and are 1–3 centimetres (0–1 in) long. The lavender, or sometimes white, flowers bloom August to October. Flowers last for one day.

== Etymology ==
The genus name Elephantopus comes from the Greek words "elephantos" (elephant) and "pous" (foot). The term likely refers to the large basal leaves of some members of the genus.

== Distribution and habitat ==
The plant is native to the south-central and southeastern United States from Florida north as far as Ohio, Illinois, and Pennsylvania, west to Texas, Oklahoma, and Kansas. It grows in open or shaded pine forests and mixed forests, with generally damp to wet soil, often sandy.

== Ecology ==
The plant is the larval host for the Cremastobombycia ignota moth.

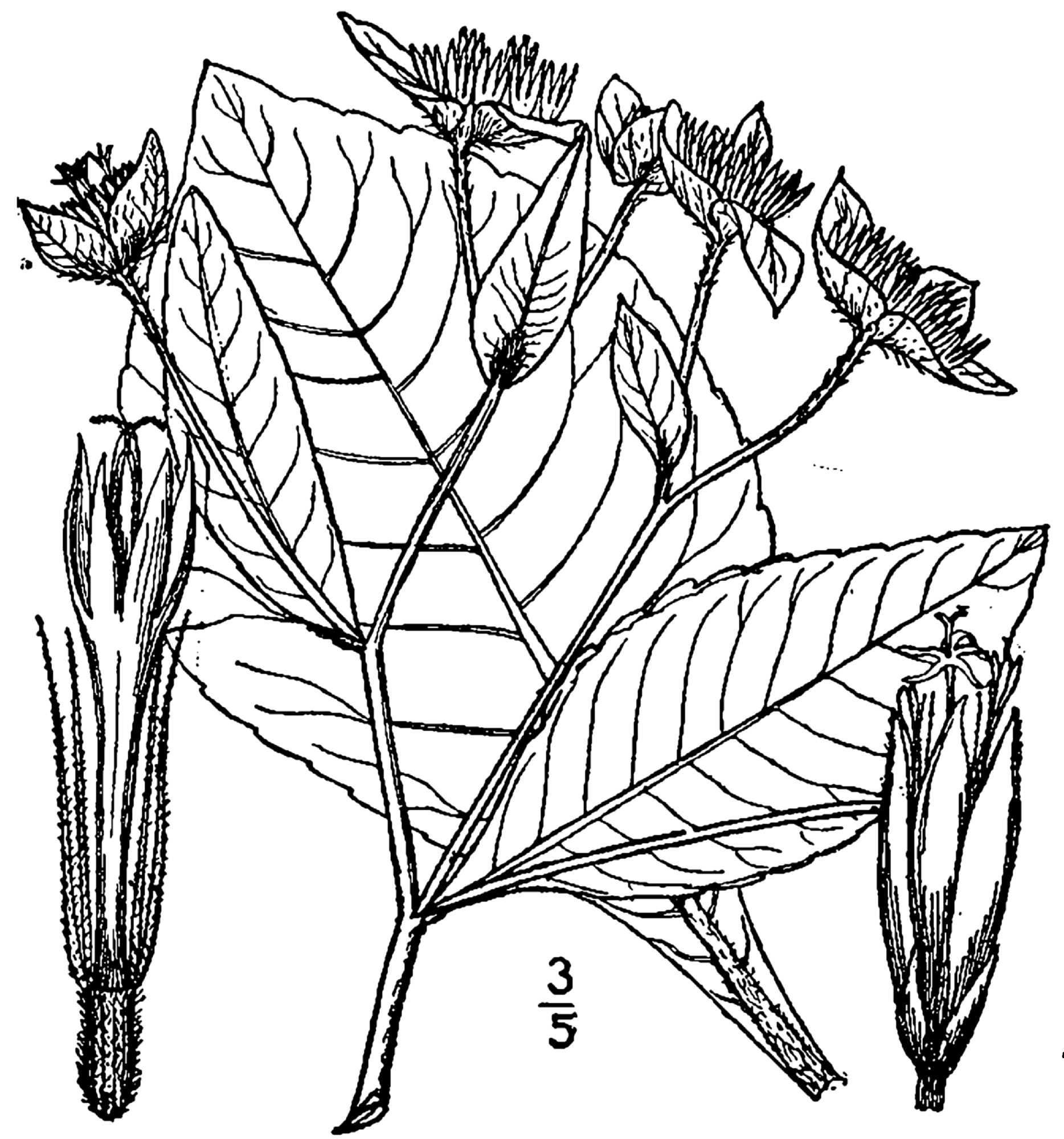

== Conservation ==
E. carolinianus is considered endangered in the states of New Jersey and Pennsylvania.
