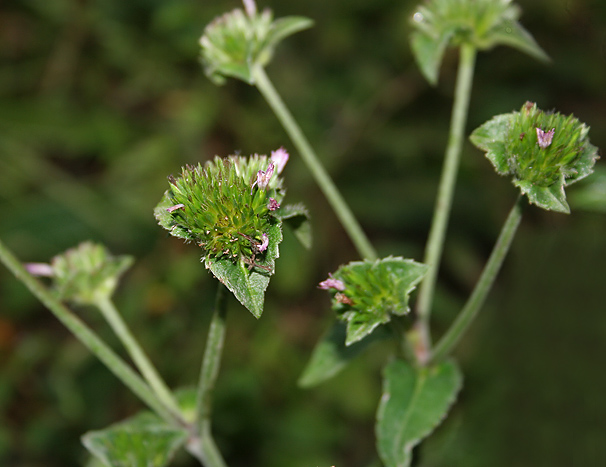
- Elephantopus scaber in India

Scientific classification
- Kingdom: Plantae
- Clade: Tracheophytes
- Clade: Angiosperms
- Clade: Eudicots
- Clade: Asterids
- Order: Asterales
- Family: Asteraceae
- Subfamily: Vernonioideae
- Tribe: Vernonieae
- Genus: Elephantopus; L.

Type species
- Elephantopus scaber L.

Synonyms
- Elephantosis Less.; Anaschovadi Adans.; Elephantopsis (Sch.Bip.) C.F.Baker; Chaetospira S.F.Blake

= Elephantopus =

Genus of flowering plants

Elephantopus is a genus of perennial plants in the daisy family (Asteraceae).

The genus is widespread over much of Africa, southern Asia, Australia, and the Americas. Several species are native to the southeastern United States, and at least one is native to India and the Himalayas.

== Uses ==
Elephantopus scaber is a traditional medicine and other species, including E. mollis and E. carolinianus, have also been investigated for medicinal properties. Elephantopus scaber contains elephantopin which is a germacranolide sesquiterpene lactone containing two lactone rings and an epoxide functional group.

== Etymology ==
The genus name Elephantopus comes from the Greek words "elephantos" (elephant) and "pous" (foot). The term likely refers to the large basal leaves of some members of the genus.

== Species ==
Accepted species

- Elephantopus angolensis O.Hoffm. - Angola
- Elephantopus arenarius Britton & P.Wilson ex Britton - Cuba
- Elephantopus arenosus Krasch. - Brazil
- Elephantopus biflorus (Less.) Sch.Bip. - Brazil
- Elephantopus carolinianus Raeusch.- southeastern + south-central United States; Cuba, Puerto Rico
- Elephantopus dilatatus Gleason - Costa Rica, Panama
- Elephantopus elatus Bertol. - southeastern United States
- Elephantopus elongatus Gardner- Brazil
- Elephantopus hirtiflorus DC. - Brazil, Venezuela
- Elephantopus mendoncae Philipson - Angola
- Elephantopus micropappus Less.- Brazil
- Elephantopus mollis Kunth native to Latin America + West Indies; widely naturalized in tropics of Africa, Asia, Australia, various islands
- Elephantopus multisetus O.Hoffm. ex T.Durand & De Wild. - Angola, Zaire, Tanzania
- Elephantopus nudatus A.Gray - southeastern + south-central United States, east Texas to Maryland
- Elephantopus nudicaulis Poir. - Mexico
- Elephantopus palustris Gardner - Brazil, Bolivia, Paraguay
- Elephantopus piauiensis R.Barros & Semir - Brazil
- Elephantopus pratensis C.Wright - Cuba
- Elephantopus racemosus Gardner- Brazil
- Elephantopus riparius Gardner- Brazil
- Elephantopus scaber L.- China, India, southeast Asia, northern Australia; naturalized in Africa, Madagascar, Latin America
- Elephantopus senegalensis (Klatt) Oliv. & Hiern- tropical Africa
- Elephantopus tomentosus L. - southern United States
- Elephantopus vernonioides S. Moore - Africa
- Elephantopus virgatus Desv. ex Ham. - Guyana
- Elephantopus welwitschii Hiern - Africa

=== Formerly placed here ===
- Orthopappus angustifolius (Sw.) Gleason (as Elephantopus angustifolius Sw.)

== Image ==
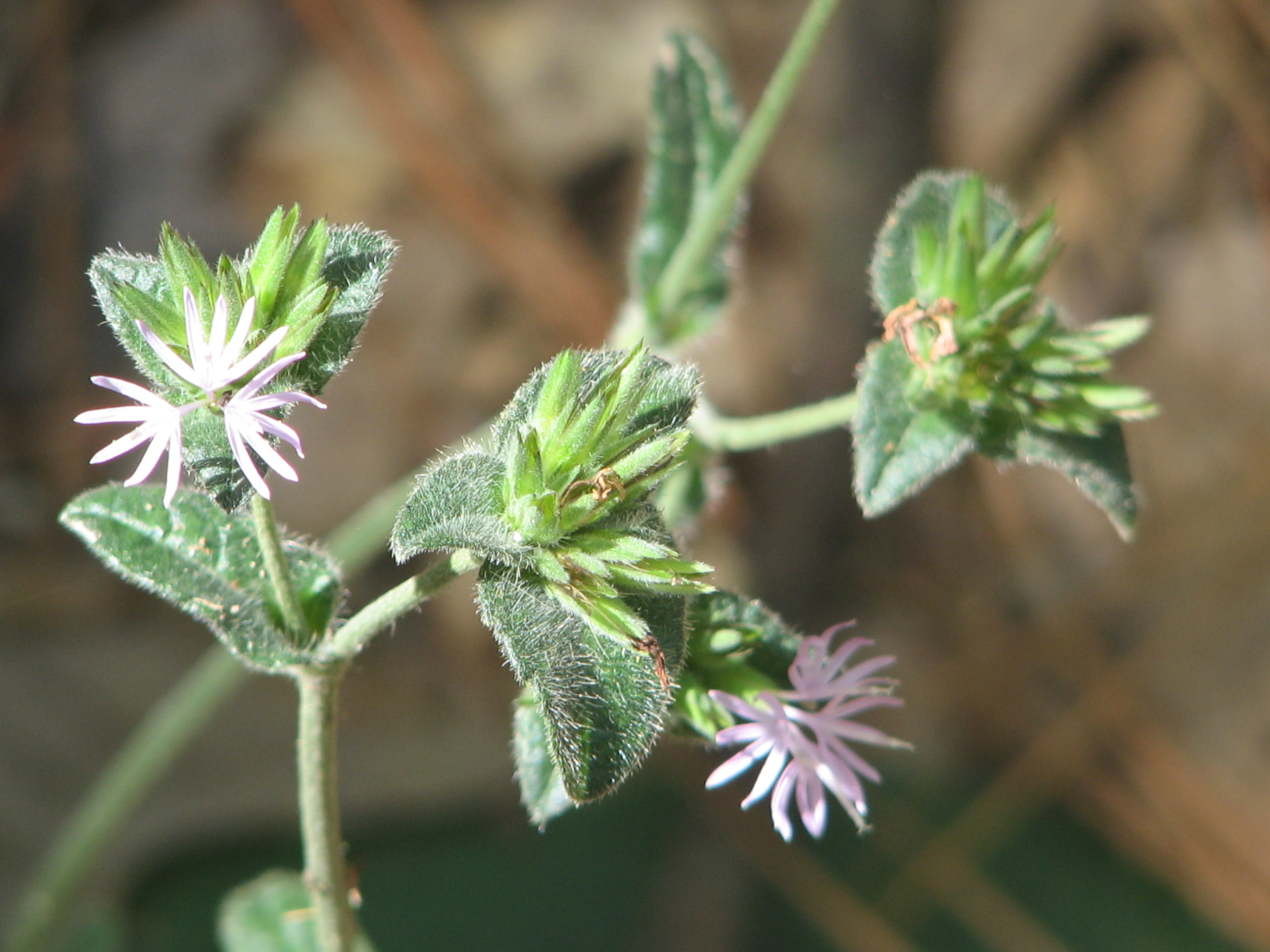
Elephantopus tomentosus in the United States
