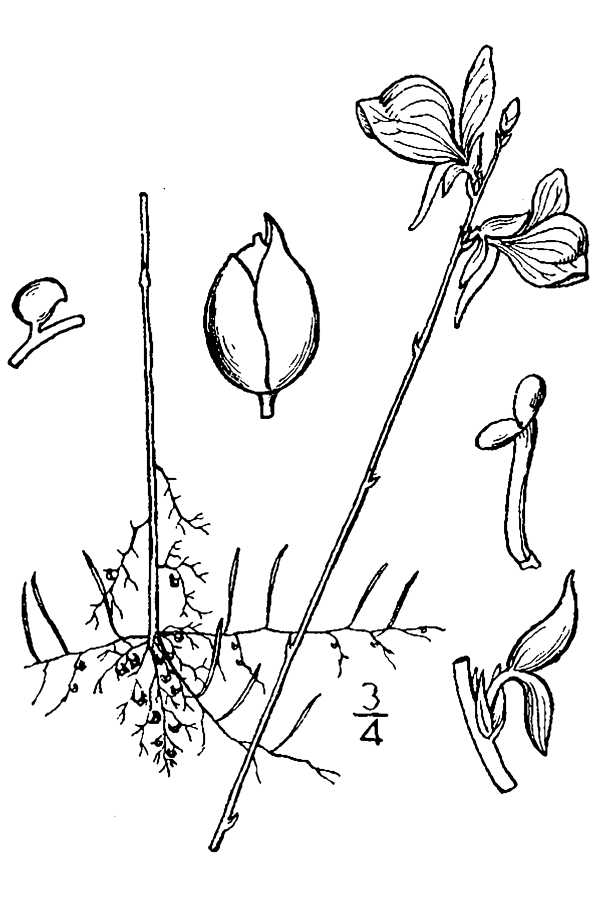
- Utricularia cornuta illustration from 1913

Scientific classification
- Kingdom: Plantae
- Clade: Tracheophytes
- Clade: Angiosperms
- Clade: Eudicots
- Clade: Asterids
- Order: Lamiales
- Family: Lentibulariaceae
- Genus: Utricularia
- Subgenus: Utricularia subg. Bivalvaria
- Section: Utricularia sect. Stomoisia (Raf.) Kuntze

Type species
- U. cornuta Michx.

Species
- Utricularia cornuta; Utricularia juncea

Synonyms
- Personula Raf., as genus; Stomoisia Raf., as genus

= Utricularia sect. Stomoisia =

Group of carnivorous plants

Utricularia sect. Stomoisia is a section in the genus Utricularia. The two species in this section are small to medium-sized terrestrial carnivorous plants native to North, Central, and South America. Constantine Samuel Rafinesque originally described and published this section as a separate genus in his 1838 taxonomic treatment. Otto Kuntze reduced the genus to its current status as a section in the genus Utricularia in 1903. Peter Taylor later refined the section, placing it in subgenus Utricularia in his 1986 monograph of the genus, also bringing one of Rafinesque's other genera, Personula, into synonymy with the new section. Later molecular data resulted in the revision of Taylor's treatment, reinstating subgenus Bivalvaria and placing this section within it.

== See also ==
- List of Utricularia species
