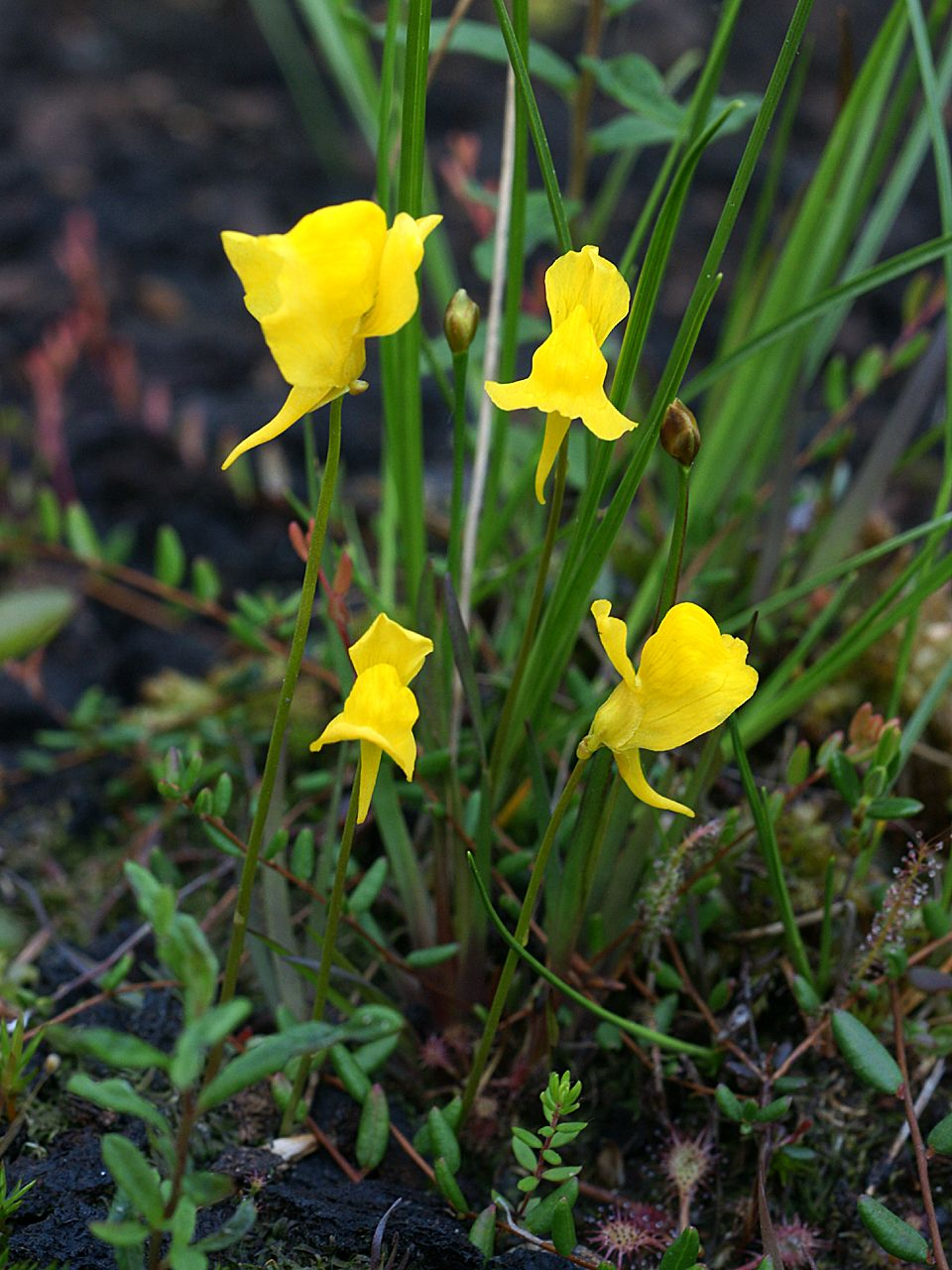

Scientific classification
- Kingdom: Plantae
- Clade: Tracheophytes
- Clade: Angiosperms
- Clade: Eudicots
- Clade: Asterids
- Order: Lamiales
- Family: Lentibulariaceae
- Genus: Utricularia
- Subgenus: Utricularia subg. Bivalvaria
- Section: Utricularia sect. Stomoisia
- Species: U. cornuta

Binomial name
- Utricularia cornuta Michx.

Synonyms
- Stomoisia cornuta (Michx.) Raf.

= Utricularia cornuta =

Species of carnivorous plant

Utricularia cornuta, the horned bladderwort, is a small to medium-sized, probably perennial species of carnivorous plant in the family Lentibulariaceae. It is endemic to North America and can be found in the Bahamas, Cuba, Canada, and the United States. Utricularia cornuta grows as a terrestrial or subaquatic plant in marshes, swamps, and pools in shallow waters, mostly at lower altitudes. It was originally described and published by André Michaux in 1803.

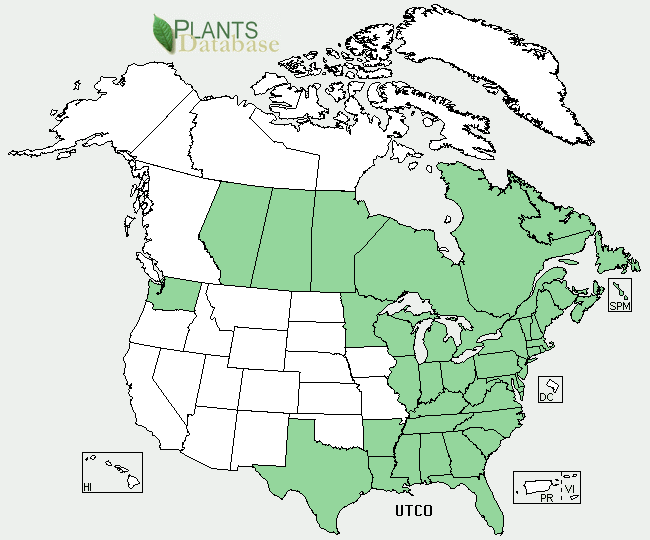
Distribution Map

== See also ==
- List of Utricularia species
