= Nigropallidal encephalomalacia =

Neurological disease of horses

Nigropallidal encephalomalacia or Chewing disease is a neurological condition that affects horses that have eaten certain toxic plants. Affected animals are unable to prehend food because of lip and tongue paralysis, and may appear to keep their jaws open with the tongue protruded because of reduced jaw tone. Some horses may appear to show their upper teeth because of increased hypertonicity (increased muscle tone) of the facial and upper lip muscles. Other animals may show severe depression and carrying their heads low. Because poisoned horses are unable to eat, these animals become weakened and ultimately die of starvation.

The principal cause is thought to be prolonged ingestion of Centaurea solstitialis (yellow star-thistle) or Rhaponticum repens (creeping knapweed or Russian knapweed) which leads to the development of Parkinson's disease like symptoms. The development of the disease typically occurs when the toxic plant is more than 50% of the horse's diet over a protracted period. The causative agent for is believed to be repin, a Sesquiterpene lactone.

== Occurrence ==
The disease appears to be restricted to areas where the causative plant species have become invasive and may represent the only food available. Most evidence from published data relates to the western US and to Victoria, Australia.
