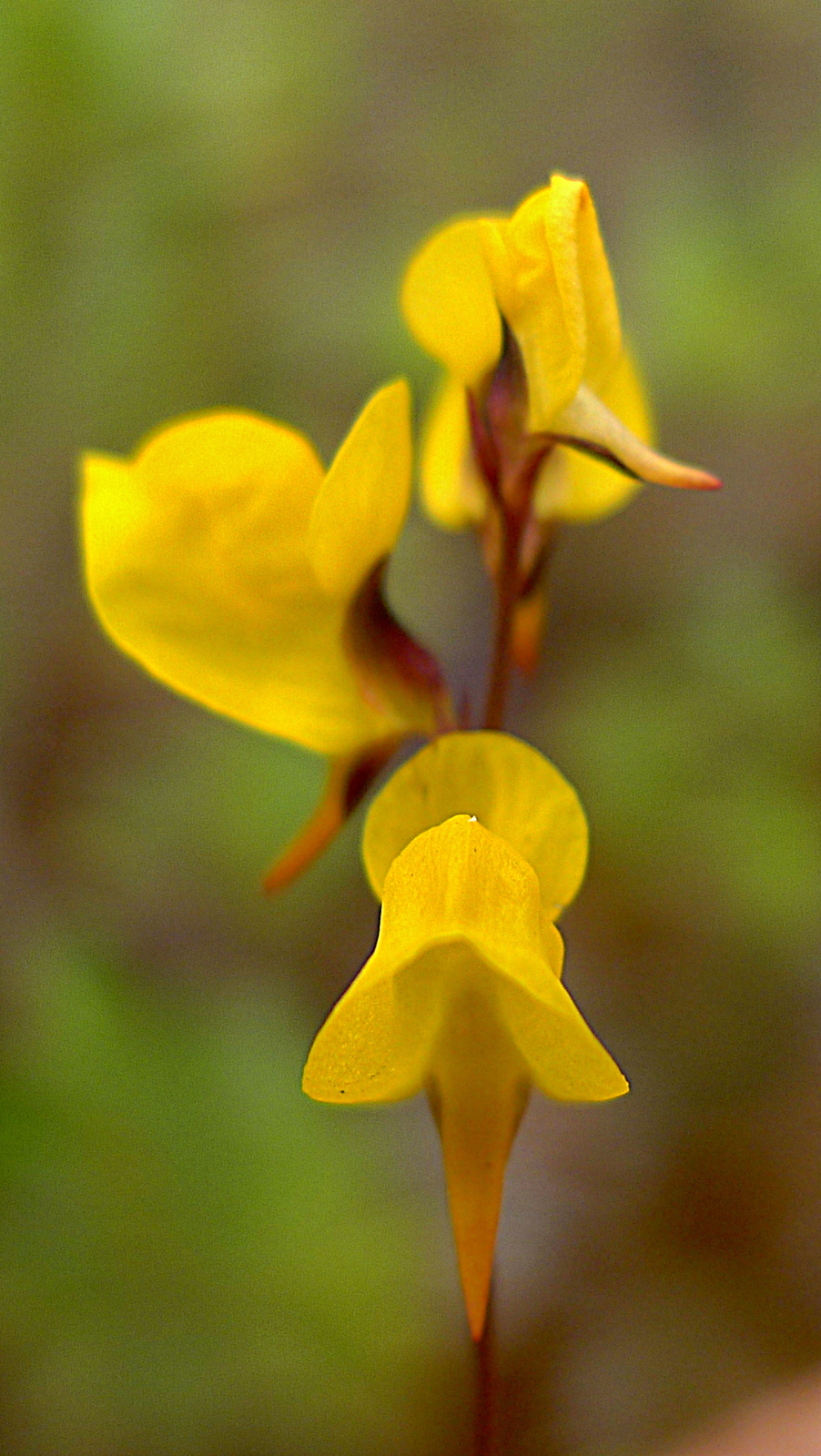

Conservation status
- Least Concern (IUCN 3.1)

Scientific classification
- Kingdom: Plantae
- Clade: Tracheophytes
- Clade: Angiosperms
- Clade: Eudicots
- Clade: Asterids
- Order: Lamiales
- Family: Lentibulariaceae
- Genus: Utricularia
- Subgenus: Utricularia subg. Bivalvaria
- Section: Utricularia sect. Stomoisia
- Species: U. juncea

Binomial name
- Utricularia juncea Vahl

= Utricularia juncea =

Species of carnivorous plant

Utricularia juncea, the southern bladderwort, is a small to medium-sized, probably perennial carnivorous plant, in the family Lentibulariaceae. It is native to the Americas. It grows as a terrestrial plant in marshes, swamps, and pools in shallow waters, mostly at lower altitudes. It was originally described and published by Martin Vahl in 1804.

== Synonyms ==
- Personula grandiflora Raf.
- Stomoisia juncea (Vahl) Barnhart
- S. virgatula (Barnhart) Barnhart
- Utricularia angulosa Poir.
- U. cornuta var. michauxii Gomez
- U. juncea f. minima S.F.Blake
- U. juncea f. virgatula (Barnhart) Fernald
- U. personata Leconte ex Elliott
- U. sclerocarpa Wright ex Sauvalle
- U. simplex Wright ex Sauvalle
- U. stricta G.Mey.
- U. virgatula Barnhart

== See also ==
- List of Utricularia species
