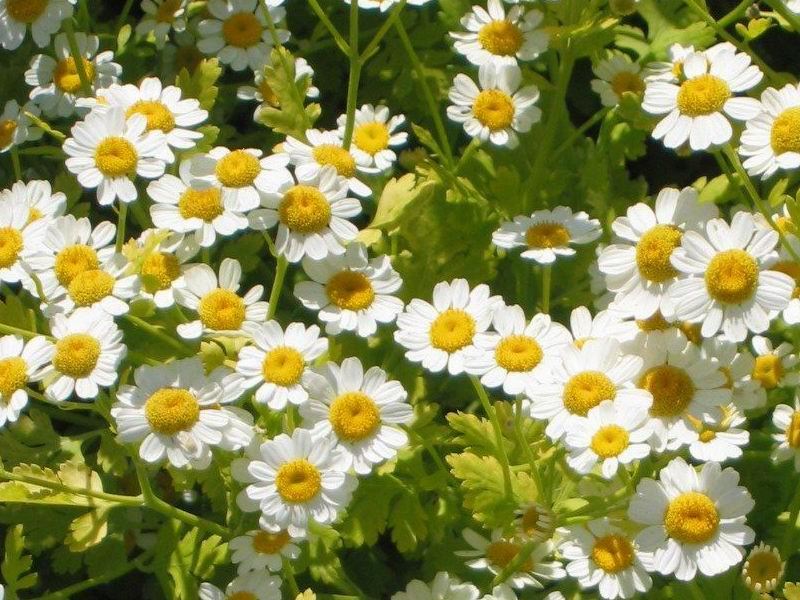

Conservation status
- Least Concern (IUCN 3.1) (Europe regional assessment)

Scientific classification
- Kingdom: Plantae
- Clade: Tracheophytes
- Clade: Angiosperms
- Clade: Eudicots
- Clade: Asterids
- Order: Asterales
- Family: Asteraceae
- Genus: Tanacetum
- Species: T. parthenium

Binomial name
- Tanacetum parthenium (L.) Sch.Bip.

Synonyms
- Chrysanthemum parthenium (L.) Bernh.; Matricaria parthenium L.; Pyrethrum parthenium (L.) Sm.

= Tanacetum parthenium =

Feverfew

Species of flowering plant in the daisy family

Tanacetum parthenium, known as feverfew, is a flowering plant in the daisy family, Asteraceae. It may be grown as an ornament, and may be identified by its synonyms, Chrysanthemum parthenium and Pyrethrum parthenium. Having its origin in the Balkans region, it is now distributed worldwide.

Although long used in traditional medicine, there is no clinical evidence that it has any therapeutic effects.

== Description ==
The plant is a herbaceous perennial that grows into a small bush, up to 70 cm (28 in) high, with pungently-scented leaves. The leaves are light yellowish green, variously pinnatifid. The conspicuous daisy-like flowers are up to 20 millimetres (3/4 in) across, borne in lax corymbs. The outer, ray florets have white ligules and the inner, disc florets are yellow and tubular. It spreads rapidly by seed, and will cover a wide area after a few years. The plant produces achene fruit, and grows on stony slopes and river beds.

== Location and cultivation ==
Feverfew is native to Eurasia, specifically the Balkans, Anatolia, and the Caucasus, but cultivation has spread it around the world.

A perennial herb, it favors full sun 38 to 46 cm (15–18 in) apart. It grows up to 70 cm (28 in) tall. It is hardy to USDA zone 5 (−30 °C or −22 °F).

Outside of its native range, it may become an invasive weed.

== Uses ==
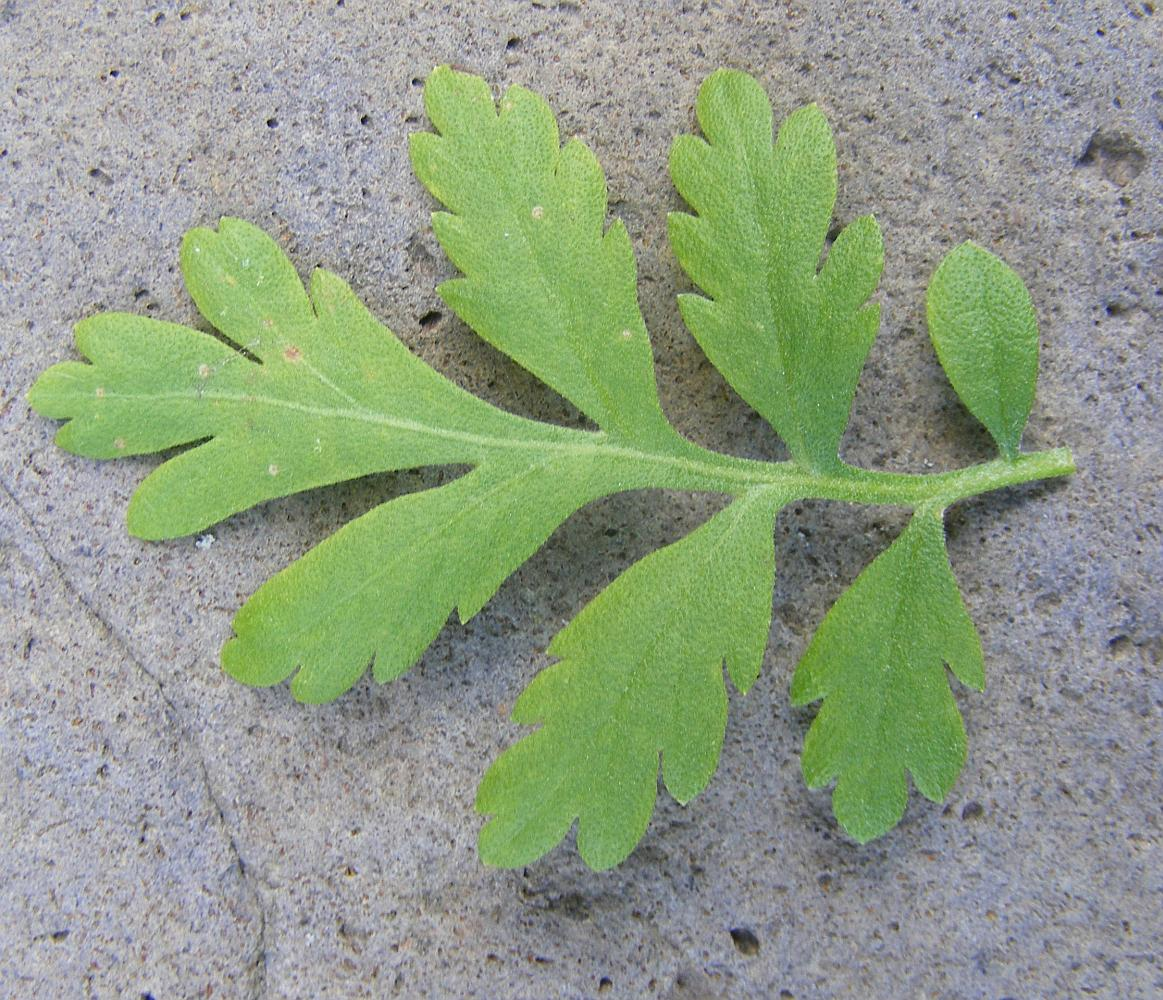
Leaf of feverfew

The chemical structure of parthenolide

=== Phytochemicals and traditional medicine ===
Phytochemicals found in feverfew include parthenolide, camphor, and the flavonoids luteolin, and apigenin. Feverfew has been used in traditional medicine, particularly in Europe, where it is mentioned in an herbal monograph as a safe compound. There is no clinical evidence for its use in treating migraines or any other clinical condition.

=== Dietary supplement ===
The parthenolide content of commercially available feverfew supplements varies substantially (by more than 40-fold) despite labeling claims of "standardization".

=== Adverse effects ===
Long-term use of feverfew followed by abrupt discontinuation may induce a withdrawal syndrome featuring rebound headaches and muscle and joint pains. Feverfew may cause allergic reactions in those allergic to the daisy family, including contact dermatitis or swelling and numbness of the mouth. Other side effects have included gastrointestinal upset such as mild nausea, vomiting, abdominal pain, diarrhea, and flatulence, which are, fortunately mild and transient. When the herb is chewed or taken orally it may cause mouth ulcers. Feverfew should not be taken by pregnant women. It may interact with blood thinners and increase the risk of bleeding, and also may interact with a variety of medications metabolized by the liver.

== History and etymology ==
The word feverfew possibly derives from a feathery plant known as featherfew.

Although its earliest use is unknown, it was documented in the 1st century CE by the Greek herbalist physician Dioscorides. Much earlier, but less specifically, a text of Hippocrates in the 4th century BCE lists it as useful in treating lesions (On Ulcers 14).
