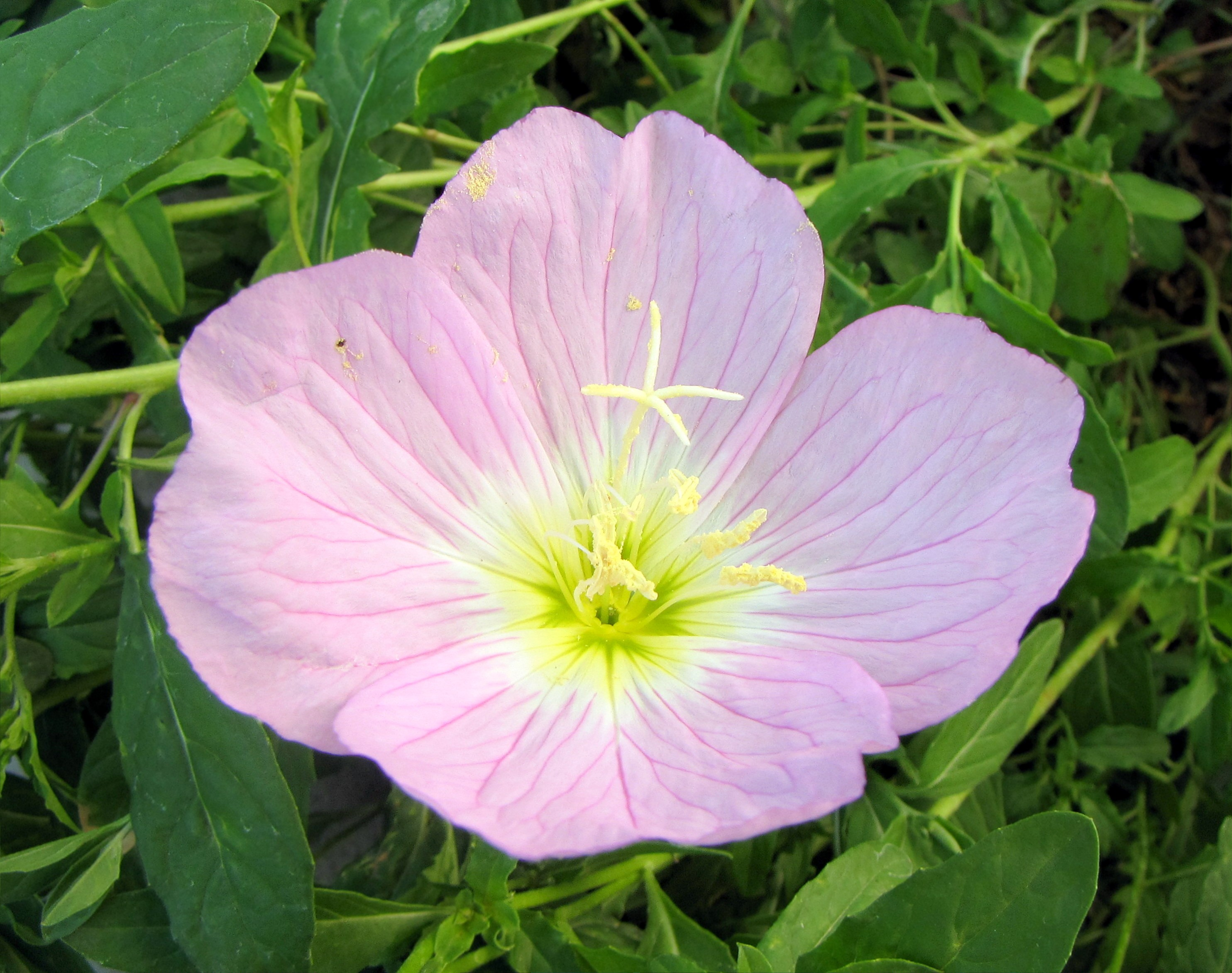

Conservation status
- Secure (NatureServe)

Scientific classification
- Kingdom: Plantae
- Clade: Tracheophytes
- Clade: Angiosperms
- Clade: Eudicots
- Clade: Rosids
- Order: Myrtales
- Family: Onagraceae
- Genus: Oenothera
- Species: O. speciosa

Binomial name
- Oenothera speciosa Nutt.

Synonyms
- Hartmannia speciosa (Nutt.) Small; Xylopleurum speciosum (Nutt.) Raim.; Xylopleurum drummondii Spach; Xylopleurum nuttallii Spach; Xylopleurum obtusifolium Spach; Hartmannia berlandieri (Spach) Rose, syn of var. berlandieri; Xylopleurum berlandieri Spach, syn of var. berlandieri; Oenothera tetraptera var. childsii L.H. Bailey, syn of var. childsii

= Oenothera speciosa =

Species of flowering plant

Oenothera speciosa is a species in the evening primrose family known by several common names, including pinkladies, pink evening primrose, showy evening primrose, Mexican primrose, and buttercups (not to be confused with true buttercups in the genus Ranunculus).

== Description ==
Oenothera speciosa is a herbaceous perennial wildflower. It has glabrous (smooth) to pubescent stems that grow to 50 centimetres (20 inches) in height. The pubescent leaves are alternate with very short or no petiole (sessile), reaching 10 cm (4 in) long to 4 cm (1 1/2 in) broad. They are variable in shape, from linear to obovate, and are toothed or wavy-edged. It produces single, four-petaled, cup-shaped flowers on the upper leaf axils. These fragrant shell-pink flowers bloom throughout the summer into early autumn. The 4–5 cm (1 1/2–2 in) flowers start out white and turn pink as they age.

The flower throats, as well as the stigmas and stamens, have a soft yellow color. It blooms both day and night, but typically in the pre-dawn hours, closing when the full sun hits them. They bloom from March to July, and occasionally in the fall. The flowers are frequented by several insect species, but moths are the most common as the flowers are mostly open at night.

== Taxonomy ==
The specific name, speciosa, means "showy".

This plant may be referred to as a buttercup, though it is not a true buttercup (genus Ranunculus), or even in the buttercup family.

=== Varieties ===
The species has the following varieties:

- Oenothera speciosa var. berlandieri (Spach) Munz
- Oenothera speciosa var. childsii (L.H. Bailey) Munz
- Oenothera speciosa var. speciosa

== Distribution and habitat ==
Originally native to the grasslands of Kansas, Missouri, Nebraska, northeastern New Mexico, Oklahoma, and Texas, it has been naturalized in 28 of the lower 48 United States as well as Chihuahua and Coahuila in Mexico. It frequently escapes from gardens.

The plant's wild habitat includes rocky prairies, open woodlands, slopes, roadsides, meadows and disturbed areas. While it makes an attractive garden plant, care should be taken with it as it can become invasive, spreading by runners and seeds. This drought-resistant plant prefers loose, fast-draining soil and full sun. It is a groundcover.

The pink evening primrose is used in the temperate latitudes as an ornamental plant, but does not survive severe winters. Within the United States Department of Agriculture's hardiness zone climates 4 to 9, and in most areas of Central Europe, the species should be sufficiently hardy. In Europe, the plant has been reported to cause deaths of hummingbird hawk-moths as they get stuck into the flower while foraging.

== Uses ==
The green plant parts can be cooked or eaten as a salad; the taste is pleasant when harvested before flowers develop.

== Gallery ==
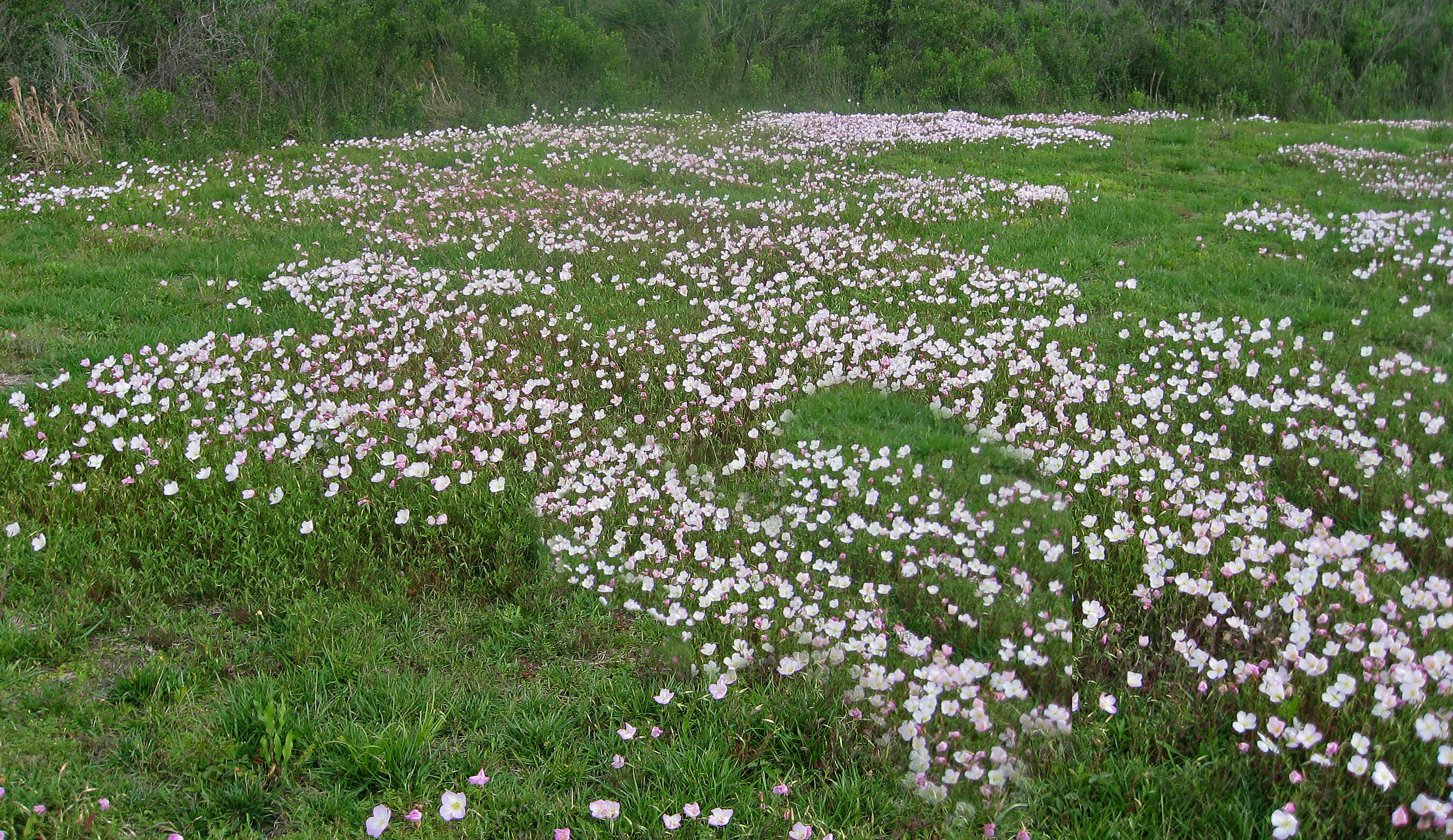
A field of O. speciosa

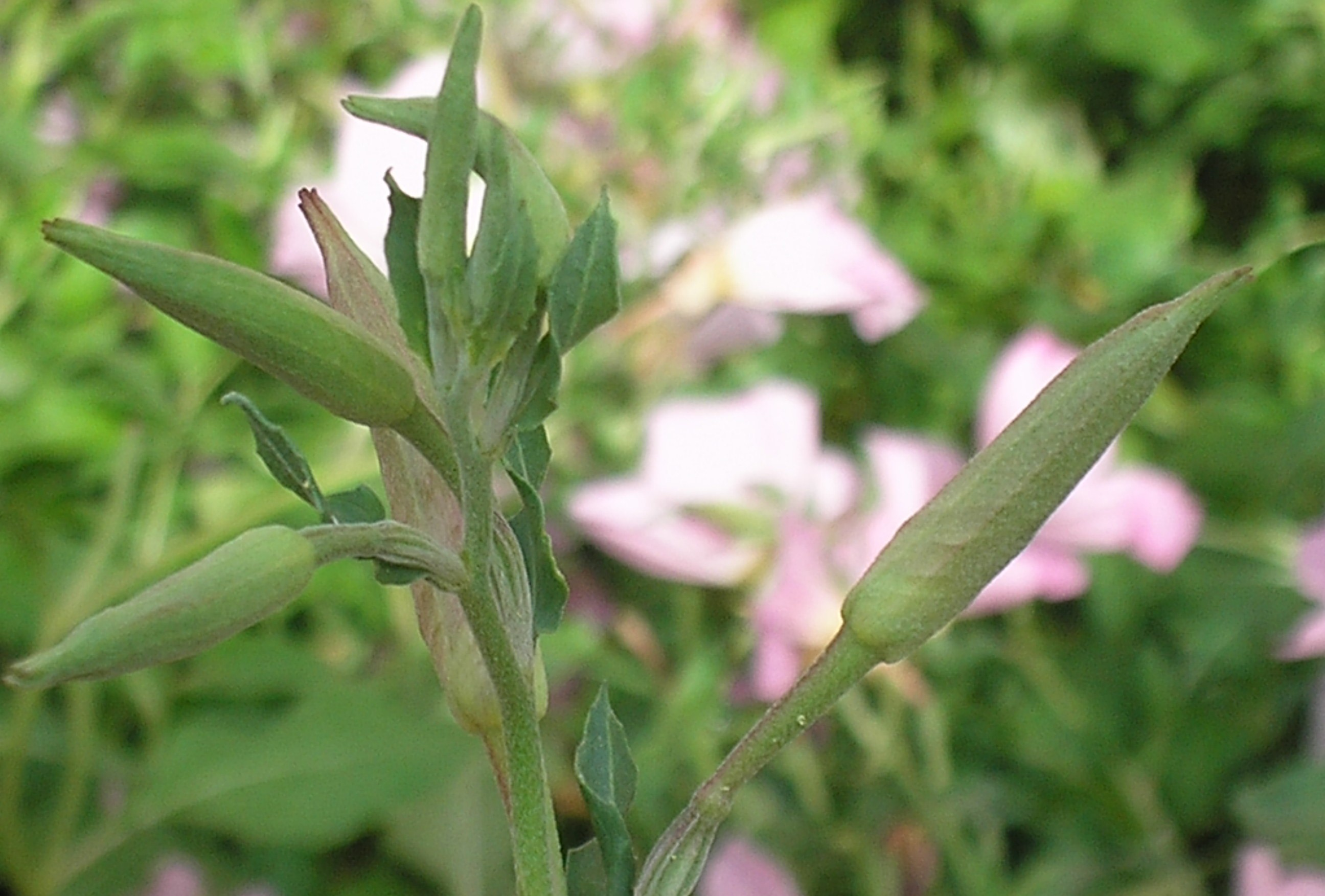
Unopened flower buds

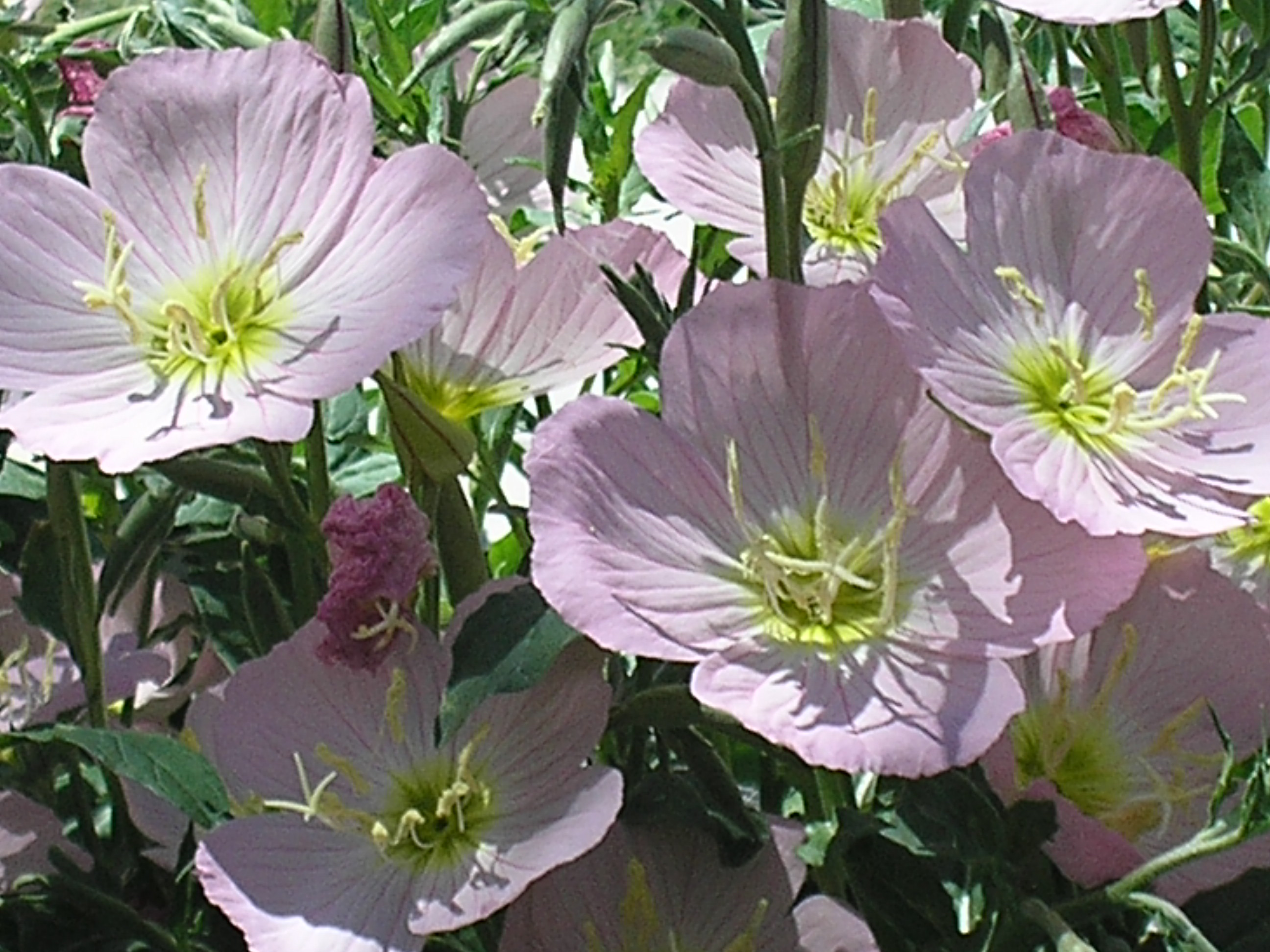

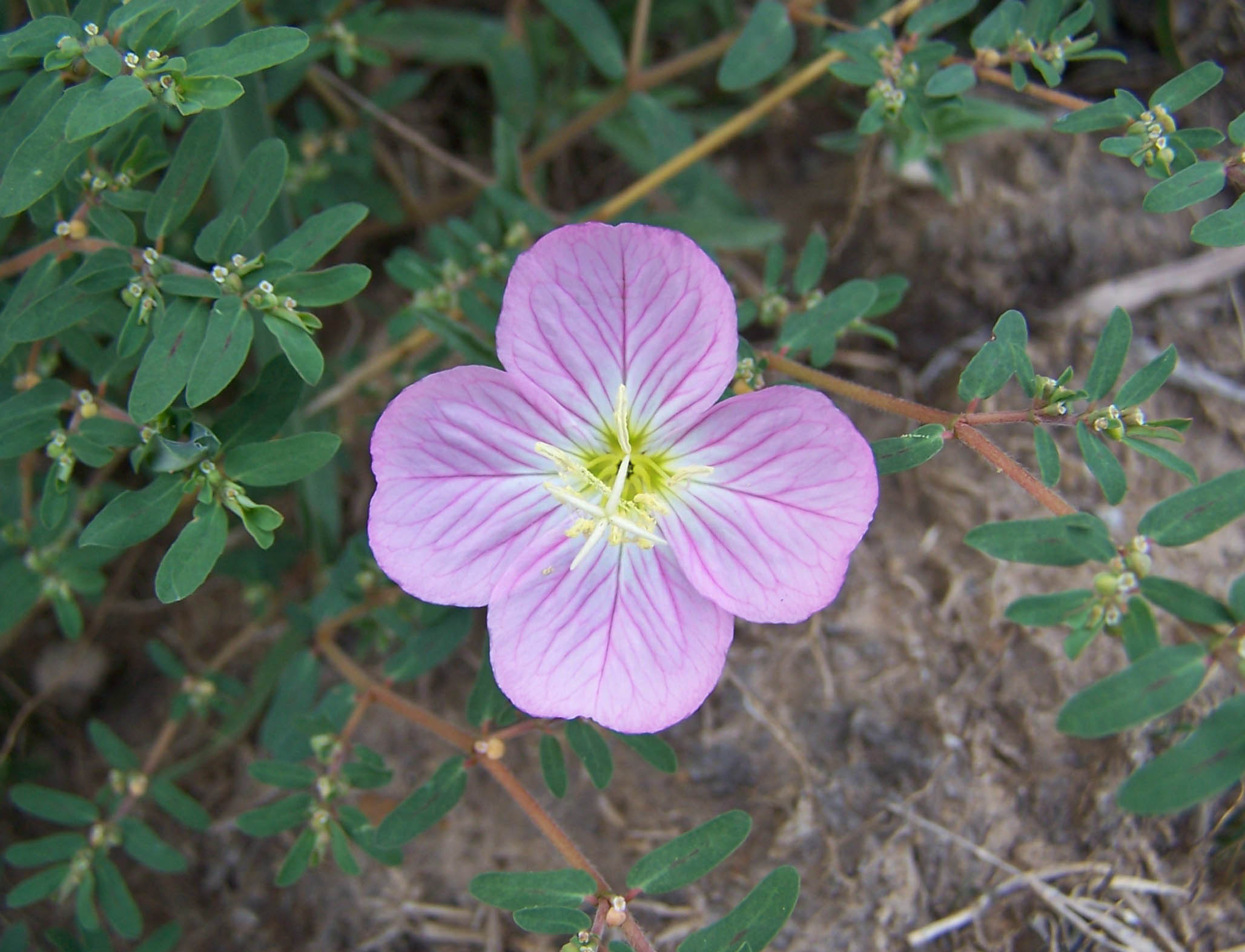

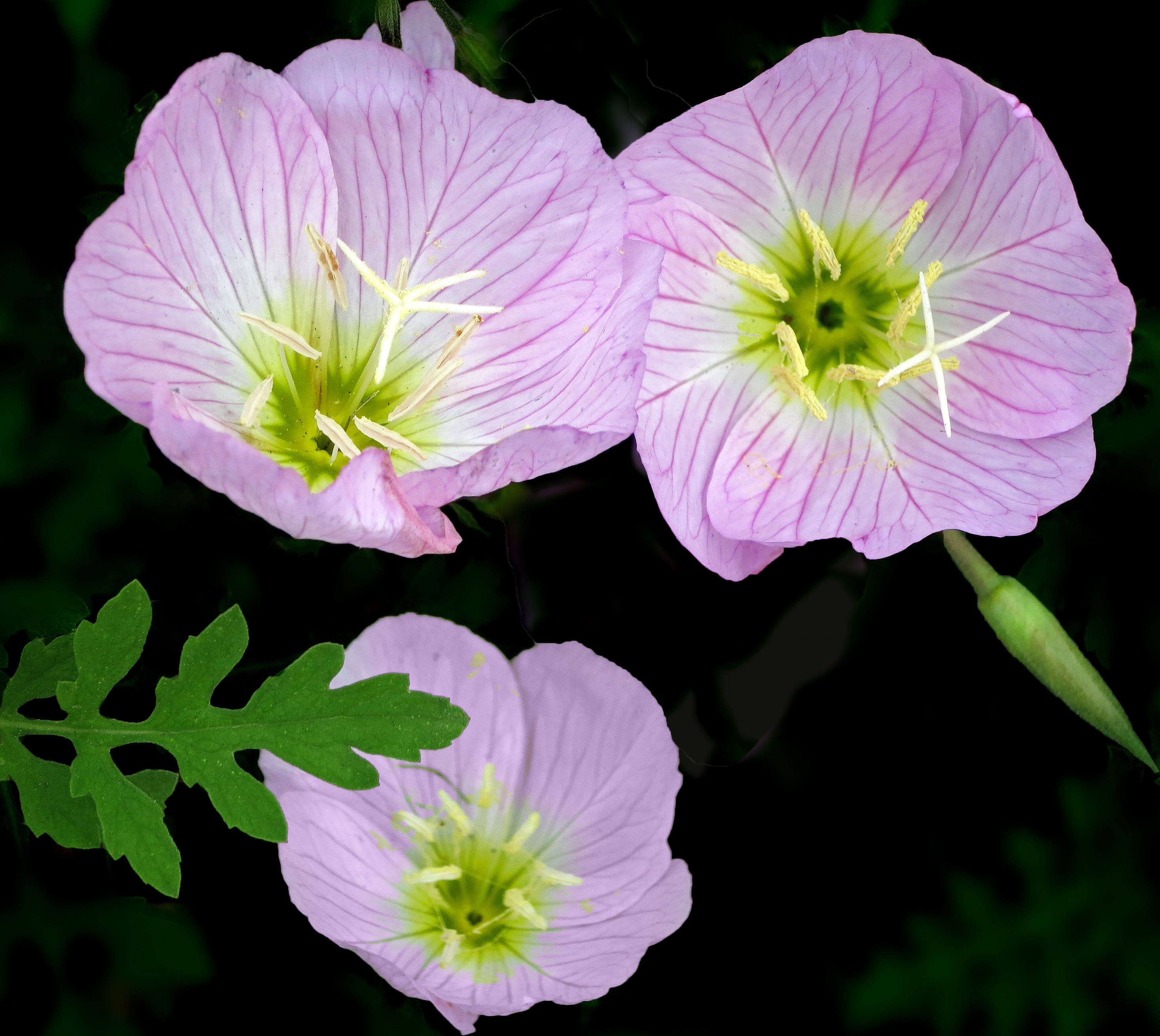
O. speciosa with bud and leaf

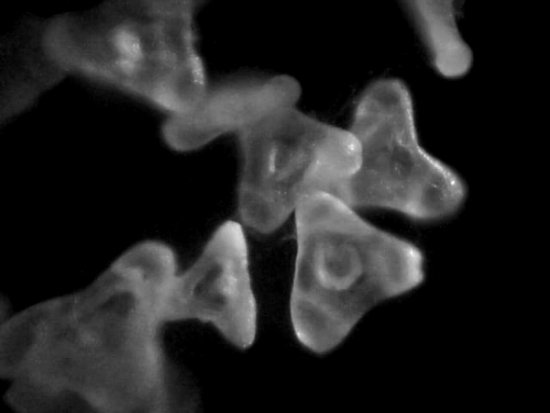
Pollen magnified 200x

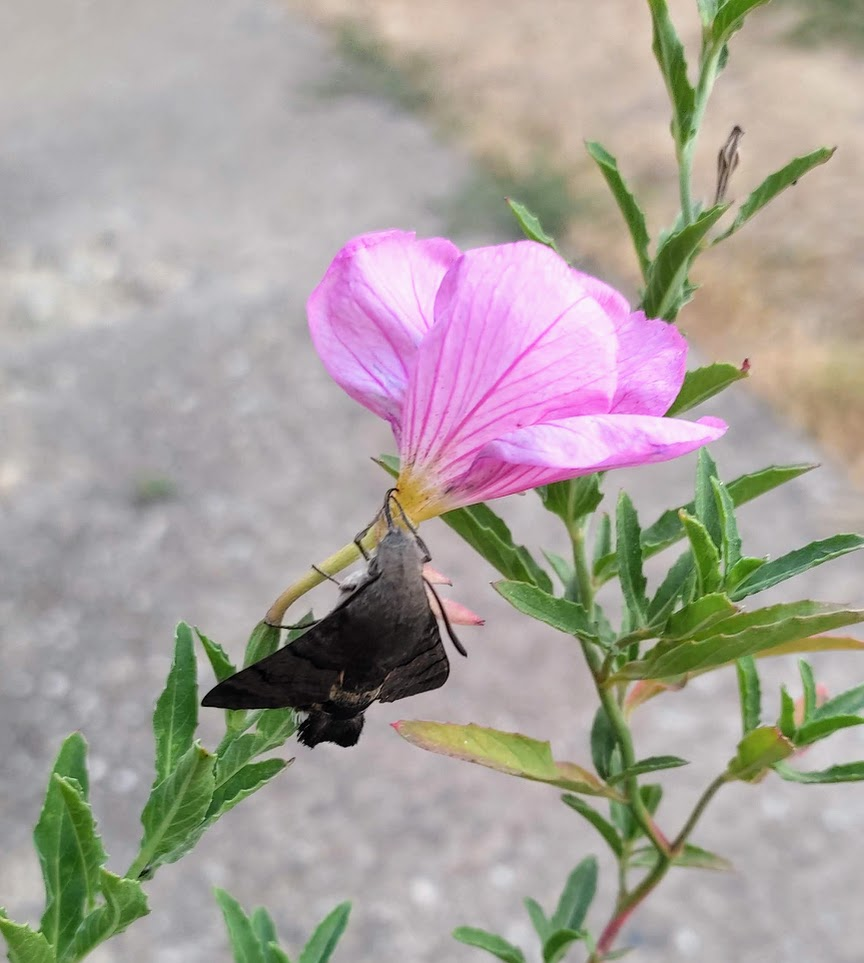
Example of Macroglossum stellatarum (hummingbird hawk-moth) stuck in Oenothera speciosa flower
