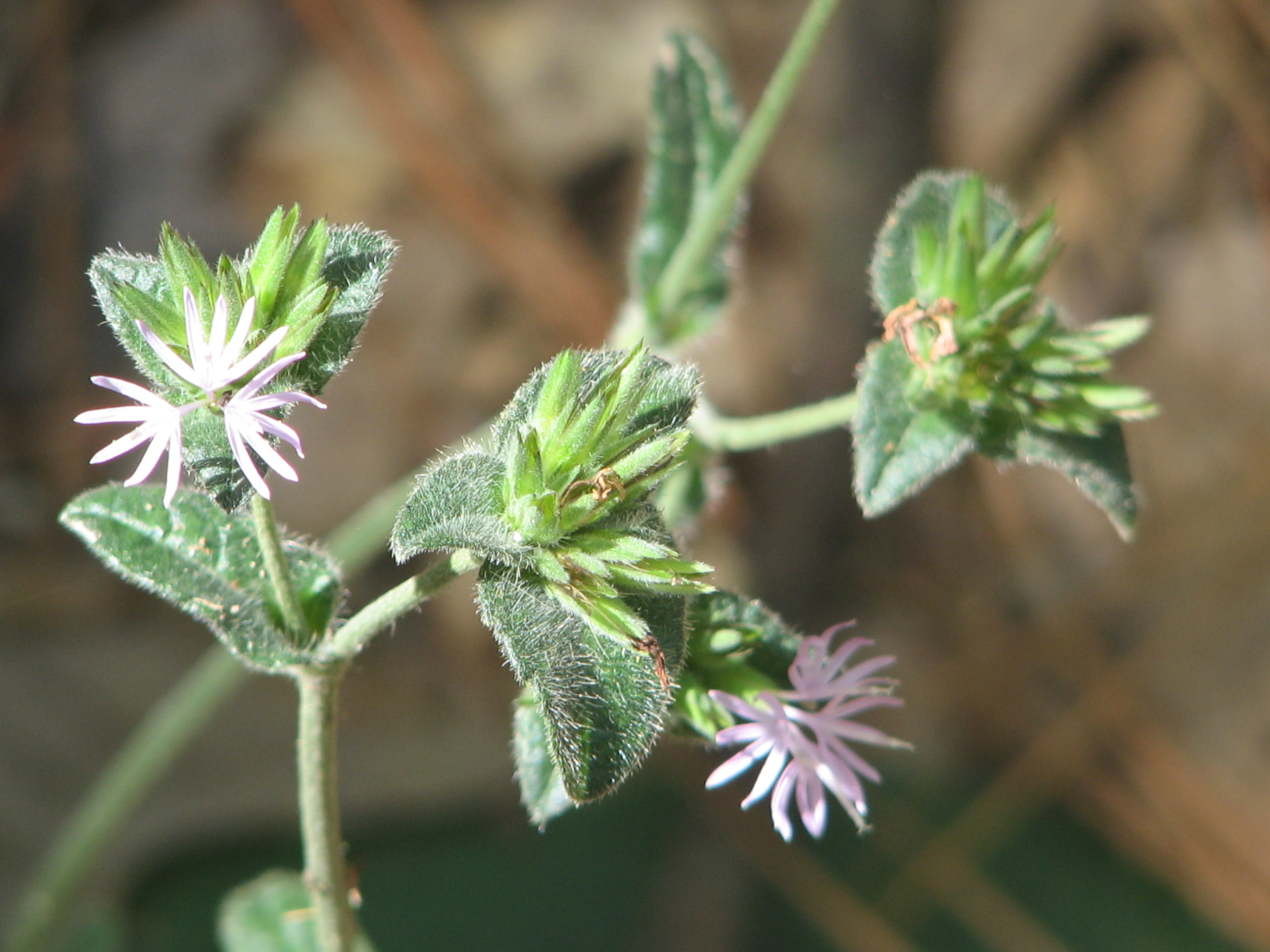

Scientific classification
- Kingdom: Plantae
- Clade: Tracheophytes
- Clade: Angiosperms
- Clade: Eudicots
- Clade: Asterids
- Order: Asterales
- Family: Asteraceae
- Genus: Elephantopus
- Species: E. tomentosus

Binomial name
- Elephantopus tomentosus L.

= Elephantopus tomentosus =

Species of flowering plant

Elephantopus tomentosus is a species of perennial flowering plant in the family Asteraceae. It is native to the southeastern United States. It blooms from July to September.

Common names include mammoth's foot, woolly elephant's foot, and devil's grandmother.

== Description ==
E. tomentosus reaches a height of about 2 feet (approximately 0.6 meters). It leaves are obovate to oblanceolate in shape, ranging from 3 to 8 centimeters in length and 4 to 12 millimeters in width. When it flowers, from August to November, inflorescence is most commonly pale pink or purple. Blooms are rarely white.

== Distribution and habitat ==
This species is native to the southeastern United States' coastal plain, its range stretching from Maryland to Florida and westward to Texas and Arkansas. It is also native in areas south of the United States, to Chiapas, Mexico.

E. tomentosus is commonly found in woodlands and along woodland borders. Individuals have also been observed in habitats such as mixed woodlands, upland pine woodlands, and along the edges of rivers. It is considered to be a facultative species.

== Etymology ==
The genus name Elephantopus comes from the Greek words "elephantos" (elephant) and "pous" (foot). The term likely refers to the large basal leaves of some members of the genus.

== Fire Ecology ==
This species has been observed to increase significantly within areas that have experienced prescribed fire. It has been found that E. tomentosus occurs in its highest frequency after spring and winter prescribed burns.
