= Guaianolide =

Class of chemical compounds

Chemical structures of the two forms of guaianolide nucleus, 6,12-guaianolides (left) and 8,12-guaianolides (right)

In organic chemistry, a guaianolide is a type of sesquiterpene lactone consisting of a gamma-lactone and either a cyclopentane or cyclopentene, both fused to a central cycloheptane or cycloheptene structure. There are two subclasses, structural isomers differing in the location that part of the lactone is bonded to the central ring, known as 6,12-guaianolides and 8,12-guaianolides.

Because some of the natural products in this class of tricyclic phytochemical have been found to be potentially biologically active, there has been interest in their chemical syntheses. The full biosynthetic origin of most of the known guaianolides has not been established, but the pathway is generally presumed to begin with the formation of a germacrene lactone derived from farnesyl pyrophosphate.
