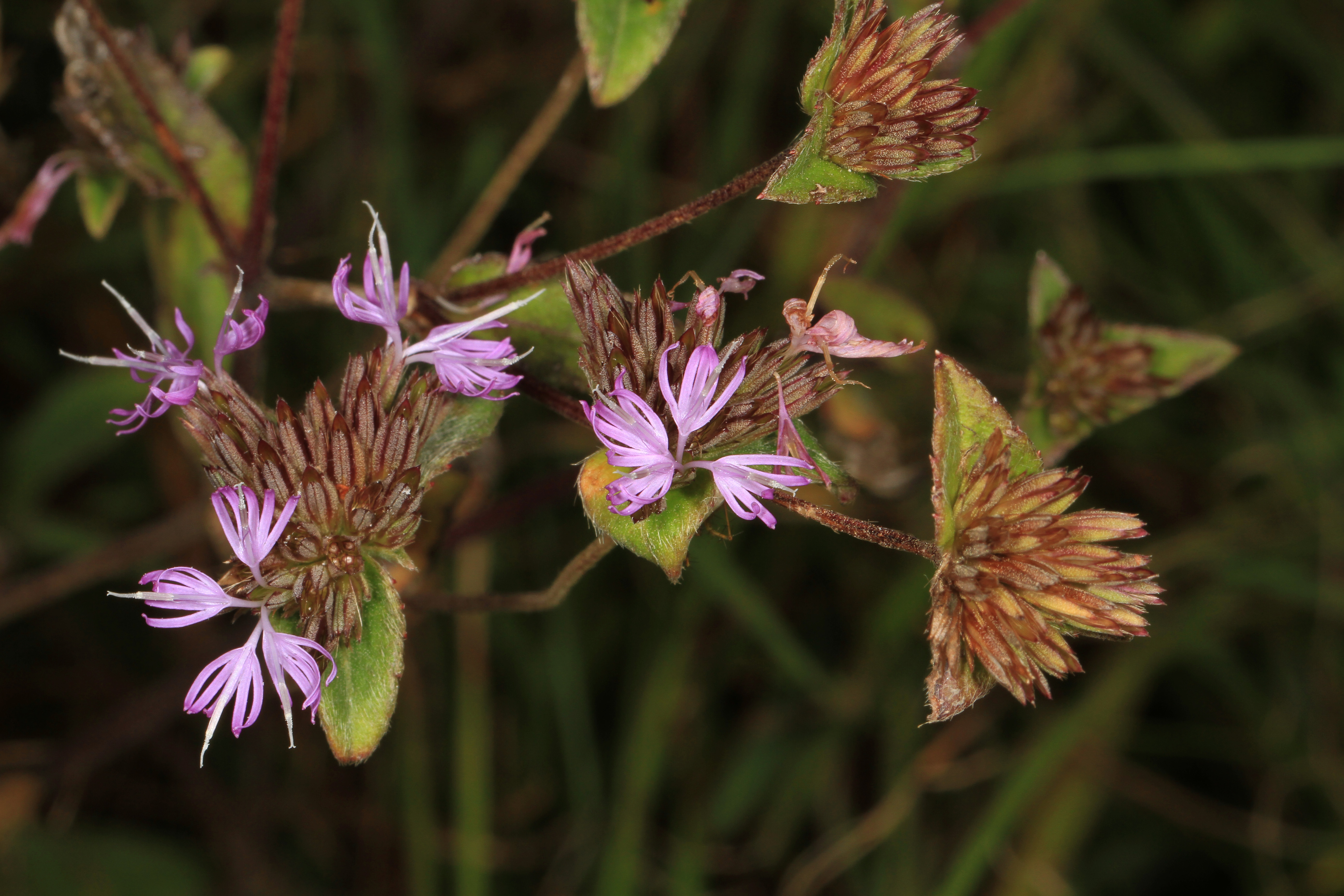

Conservation status
- Secure (NatureServe)

Scientific classification
- Kingdom: Plantae
- Clade: Embryophytes
- Clade: Tracheophytes
- Clade: Spermatophytes
- Clade: Angiosperms
- Clade: Eudicots
- Clade: Asterids
- Order: Asterales
- Family: Asteraceae
- Genus: Elephantopus
- Species: E. elatus

Binomial name
- Elephantopus elatus Bertol.

= Elephantopus elatus =

Species of flowering plant

Elephantopus elatus, common name tall elephantsfoot, is a North American species of flowering plant in the family Asteraceae. It is native to the southeastern United States from eastern Louisiana to South Carolina.

== Description ==
Elephantopus elatus is a perennial herb up to 70 cm (28 in) tall. Leaves are oblanceolate, up to 20 cm (7.9 in) long, darker on the upper side than they are on the lower side. The plant produces numerous small flower heads in a tight cluster, each head generally containing only 4-5 florets. This species flowers from August to November.

== Distribution and habitat ==
The species' range extends from South Carolina to Florida, stretching westward to Louisiana.

It has been observed in habitats such as pine flatwoods, sandhills, oak hammocks, and other well-drained environments. Within the southern region of Florida, Elephantopus elatus is primarily to dry mesic communities, which occur on poorly drained Spodosols.

This species possesses the ability to persevere through repeated burns.

== Etymology ==
The genus name Elephantopus comes from the Greek words "elephantos" (elephant) and "pous" (foot). The term likely refers to the large basal leaves of some members of the genus.

== Ecology ==
Elephantopus elatus is insect pollinated and is recorded to have been visited in northern Florida by Heriades variolosa/leavitti, Megachile albitarsis, and Megachile petulans.
