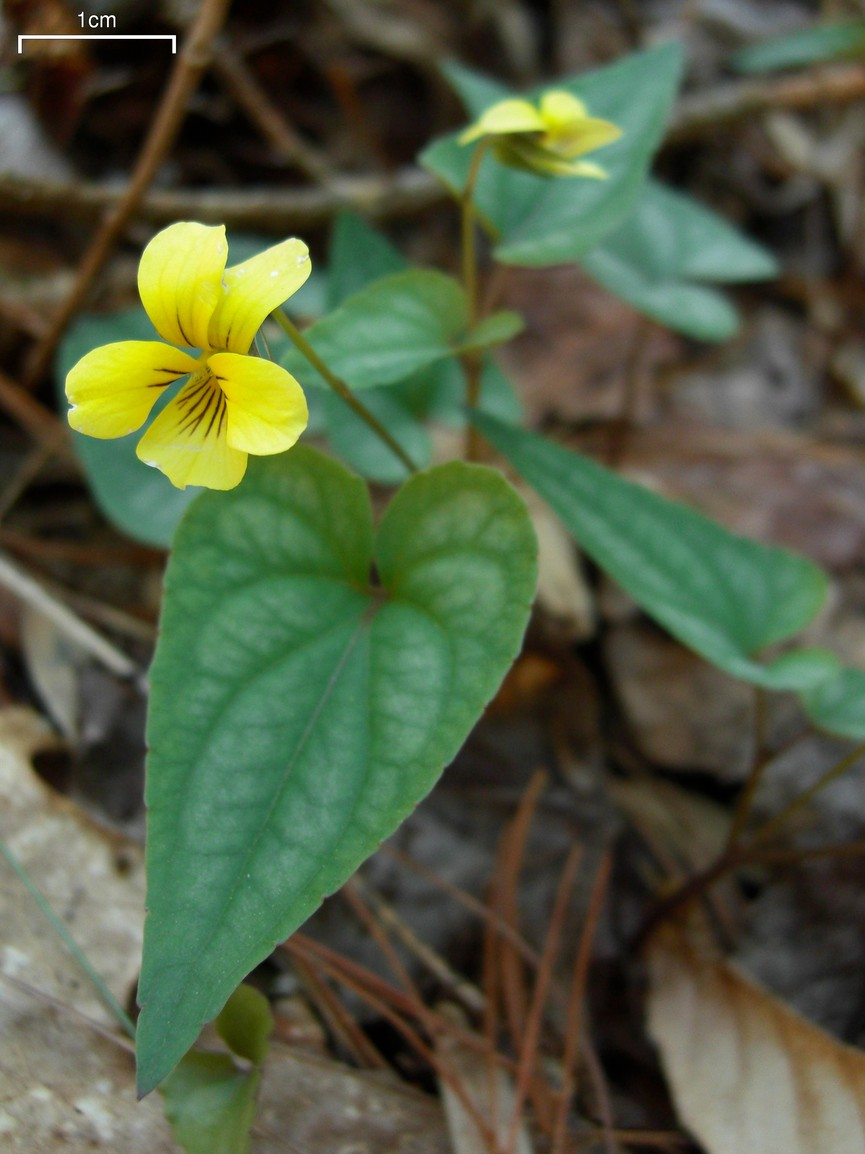

Scientific classification
- Kingdom: Plantae
- Clade: Tracheophytes
- Clade: Angiosperms
- Clade: Eudicots
- Clade: Rosids
- Order: Malpighiales
- Family: Violaceae
- Genus: Viola
- Species: V. hastata

Binomial name
- Viola hastata Michaux

= Viola hastata =

Species of flowering plant

Viola hastata, commonly known as the halberd-leaved yellow violet, is a perennial plant in the violet family found in the eastern United States. It blooms from March to May with yellow flowers.
