= Ernst Adolf Raeuschel =

German botanist

Ernst Adolf Raeuschel (1740–1800) was a German lichenologist, active between 1772 and 1797, specializing in bryophytes and spermatophytes. Sometimes spelled Rauschel.

He was the author of Nomenclator botanicus omnes plantas : ab illustr. Carolo a Linné descriptas aliisque botanicis temporis recentioris detectas enumerans. . : Lipsiae :apud I. G. Feind, 1797. (3rd ed.) LCCN: agr05000967 OCLC: 15250876 Full text available . Some of the plant species described by Raeuschel include Allophylus cobbe, Callicarpa dichotoma and Elephantopus carolinianus. The Snow Lichen Stereocaulon ramulosum was described by Raeuschel in 1797.
