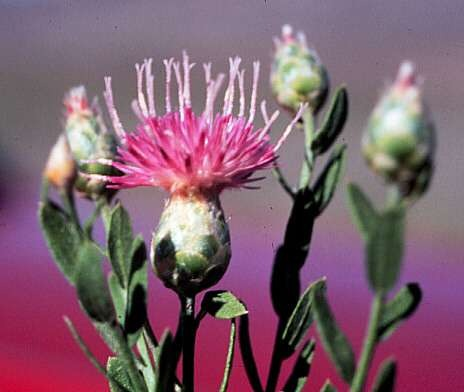

Scientific classification
- Kingdom: Plantae
- Clade: Embryophytes
- Clade: Tracheophytes
- Clade: Spermatophytes
- Clade: Angiosperms
- Clade: Eudicots
- Clade: Asterids
- Order: Asterales
- Family: Asteraceae
- Tribe: Cardueae
- Genus: Rhaponticum
- Species: R. repens

Binomial name
- Rhaponticum repens (L.) Hidalgo

Synonyms
- Acroptilon angustifolium Cass.; Acroptilon australe Iljin; Acroptilon obtusifolium Cass.; Acroptilon picris (Pall. ex Willd.) C.A.Mey.; Acroptilon repens (L.) DC.; Acroptilon repens subsp. australe (Iljin) Rech.f.; Acroptilon serratum Cass.; Acroptilon subdentatum Cass.; Carduus picris (Pall. ex Willd.) Sweet; Centaurea picris Pall. ex Willd.; Centaurea repens L.; Leuzea repens (L.) D.J.N.Hind; Serratula amara Pall.; Serratula picris (Pall. ex Willd.) M.Bieb.

= Rhaponticum repens =

Russian knapweed

Species of flowering plant in the daisy family

Rhaponticum repens, synonyms including Acroptilon repens and Leuzea repens, with the common name Russian knapweed, is a species of bushy rhizomatous perennial belonging to the family Asteraceae.

== Description ==
Russian knapweed is a deep-rooted long-lived perennial. Some stands have been in existence for 75 years. It forms dense colonies in cultivated fields, orchards, pastures, and roadsides.

The habit grows up to 80 cm (31 in) tall.

Stems and leaves are finely arachnoid-tomentose becoming glabrous and green with age. The rosette leaves are oblanceolate, pinnately lobed to entire, 2–3 cm wide by 3–8 cm long. The lower cauline leaves are smaller, pinnately lobed; the upper leaves become much reduced, sessile, serrate to entire.

The heads are numerous terminating the branches. Flowers are pink to purplish, the marginal ones not enlarged. The outer and middle involucral bracts are broad, striate, smooth with broadly rounded tips; the inner bracts are narrower with hairy tips. Pappus present with bristles 6–11 mm long. Fruit is a whitish, slightly ridged achene.

== Taxonomy ==
The species was first described by Carl Linnaeus in 1763 as Centaurea repens. Augustin Pyramus de Candolle separated it from the genus Centaurea in 1838, placing it in the genus Acroptilon. The genus name derives from acro- (high, here meaning tip) and ptilo- (feather). A 1995 molecular phylogenetic study, the structure of the flower, and the chromosome number support separating it from the genus Centaurea. Some sources then continue to place it as the sole member of the monotypic genus Acroptilon. A phylogenetic study published in 2006 concluded that Acroptilon belongs in the genus Rhaponticum.

== Distribution ==
A native to Eurasia, Russian knapweed was introduced into North America in the late 19th century. Absent only from southeastern U.S., it has become widespread in other regions, especially in the western United States.

== Toxicity ==
Nigropallidal encephalomalacia, also called chewing disease, a movement disorder similar to Parkinson's disease, is caused in horses ingesting Russian knapweed for prolonged periods. A sesquiterpene lactone, repin, in the plant is likely responsible for this toxicity.

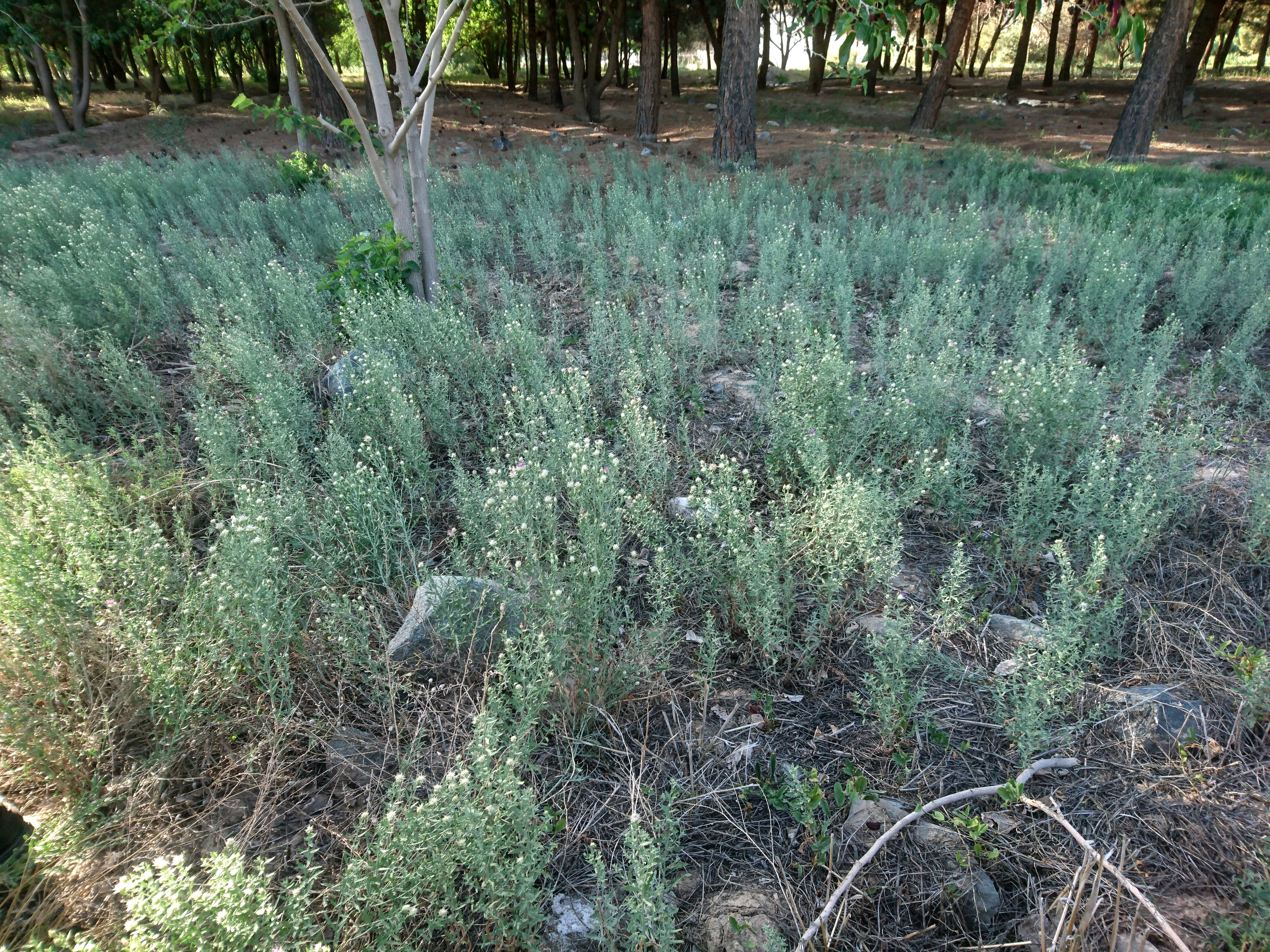
Russian knapweed in Mashhad-Iran
