= Sesquiterpene lactone =

Class of chemical compounds in plants

Sesquiterpene lactones (SLs) are a class of sesquiterpenoids that contain a lactone ring. They are most often found in plants of the family Asteraceae (daisies, asters). Other plant families with SLs are Umbelliferae (celery, parsley, carrots) and Magnoliaceae (magnolias). A collection of colorless, lipophilic solids, SLs are a rich source of drugs. They can be allergenic and toxic in grazing livestock causing severe neurological problems in horses. Some are also found in corals of the order Octocorallia.

== Types ==
Structures of some sesquiterpene lactones: A: Germacranolides, B: Heliangolides, C+D: Guaianolides, E: Pseudoguaianolides, F: Hypocretenolides, G: Eudesmanolides.

Sesquiterpene lactones can be divided into several main classes including germacranolides, heliangolides, guaianolides, pseudoguaianolides, hypocretenolides, and eudesmanolides.

== Examples ==
Artemisinin, a new, highly-effective anti-malarial compound, is a sesquiterpene lactone found in Artemisia annua. Lactucin, desoxylactucin, lactucopicrin, lactucin-15-oxalate, lactucopicrin-15-oxalate are some of the most prominent found in lettuce and spinach, giving most of the bitter taste to these crops.

One eudesmanolide, 3-oxo-5αH,8βH-eudesma-1,4(15),7(11)-trien-8,12-olide, can work with vernolic acid and other compounds in plants to reduce inflammation.

== Sesquiterpene lactone-containing plants ==
Some plants containing these compounds include:

- Artichoke
- Eupatorium
- Burdock
- Calea ternifolia
- Chamomile
- Chrysanthemum
- Dandelion (Taraxacum sp.)
- Cocklebur
- Feverfew
- Gaillardia
- Ginkgo biloba
- Laurus nobilis
- Lettuce (Lactuca)
- Mugwort
- Parthenium
- Iva (marsh elders)
- Pyrethrum
- Ragweed
- Sagebrush
- Spinach
- Star anise
- Sunflower
- Vernonia
- Wormwood
- Yellow star thistle

Quorum sensing inhibitors

Sesquiterpene lactones have been found to possess the ability to inhibit quorum sensing in bacteria.
