= Germacranolide =

Type of natural chemical

Chemical structure of costunolide, a prototypical germacranolide

Germacranolides are a group of natural chemical compounds classified as sesquiterpene lactones. They are found in a variety of plant species and are known for their diverse and complex topology, as well as a wide array of pharmacological activities.
