= 1759 in France =

- Decades: 1730s; 1740s; 1750s; 1760s; 1770s
- See also: History of France; Timeline of French history; List of years in France

Events from the year 1759 in France. France is a major participant in the Seven Years' War and its North American theater, the French and Indian War.

== Incumbents ==
- Monarch – Louis XV

== Events ==
- January – Journal des Dames published in France.
- 16 February – Thomas Arthur, comte de Lally, ends the French Army's 2-month siege of the British Indian fort at Madras and retreats
- 4 March–20 November – Étienne de Silhouette serves as Controller-General and attempts major financial reforms
- 5 March – Denis Diderot's Encyclopédie is proscribed by the Vatican and (on March 8) temporarily suppressed by the French government; the ban is lifted in September to allow publication of a revised version
- 13 April – Battle of Bergen in Hesse: French victory
- 4 July – Le Havre is bombarded by the British Royal Navy
- 25 July – British forces in North America capture Fort Niagara from the French, who subsequently abandon Fort Rouillé
- 26–27 July – Battle of Ticonderoga: At the southern end of Lake Champlain, French forces withdraw from Fort Carillon, which is taken by the British and renamed Fort Ticonderoga
- 1 August – Battle of Minden: French are defeated but withdraw in order
- 10 August – Bordeaux earthquake.
- 18 August – Battle of Lagos: The French fleet under Commodore Jean-François de La Clue-Sabran is defeated off the Portuguese coast
- 5 September & 28 October – Regulations issued for the production of printed cotton fabrics in the kingdom, permitting Christophe-Philippe Oberkampf to set up a manufactory in Jouy-en-Josas for the production of toile de Jouy
- 10 September – Battle of Pondicherry: Naval battle off the coast of India between the French under Admiral d'Aché and the British; although the military outcome is indecisive, the French fleet is badly damaged and sails home, never to return to the subcontinent
- 13 September – Battle of the Plains of Abraham: British forces led by James Wolfe defeat the French commanded by the Marquis de Montcalm (although both commanders are fatally wounded), leading to the capitulation of Quebec City
- 20 November – Battle of Quiberon Bay: The French fleet under Marshal de Conflans is defeated by the British under Edward Hawke off the coast of Brittany in the decisive naval engagement of the Seven Years' War – after this, the French are no longer able to field a significant fleet and a planned French invasion of Britain is abandoned
- Halley's Comet returns; a team of three mathematicians, Alexis Clairaut, Jérome Lalande and Nicole Reine Lepaute, have – for the first time – predicted the date
- Madame du Coudray publishes Abrégé de l'art des accouchements (The Art of Obstetrics), and the government authorizes her to carry her instruction "throughout the realm" and promises financial support

== Arts and literature ==
- 15 January – Voltaire's satire Candide is published simultaneously in five countries

== Births ==
- 29 January – Louis Augustin Guillaume Bosc, botanist (died 1828)
- 9 February – Jacques Desjardin, military officer (died 1807)
- 22 February – Claude Lecourbe, military general (died 1815)
- 21 May – Joseph Fouché, statesman (died 1820)
- 19 July – Jacques Anselme Dorthès, physician, entomologist and naturalist (died 1794)
- 27 July – Pierre Charles Baquoy, historical painter and engraver (died 1829)
- 15 August – Jean-Baptiste Jacques Augustin, miniature painter (died 1832)
- 26 October – Georges Danton, Revolutionary leader (executed 1794)
- 16 December – Charles Guillaume Alexandre Bourgeois, physicist and painter (died 1832)

== Deaths ==
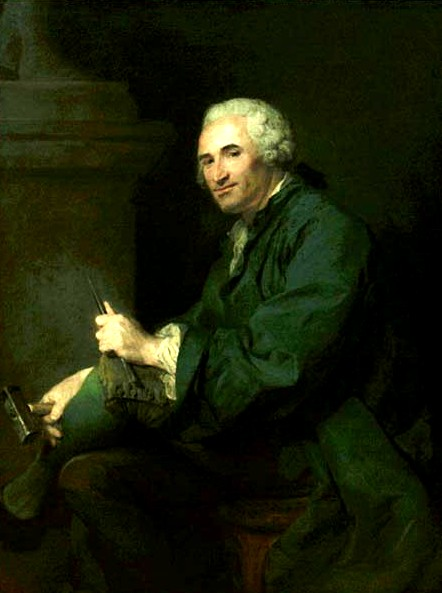
Lambert-Sigisbert Adam

- 10 March – Antoine Magnol, physician and botanist (born 1676)
- 28 April – Marie Louise Trichet, Catholic religious (born 1684)
- 12 May – Lambert-Sigisbert Adam, sculptor (born 1700)
- 3 June – Didier Diderot, craftsman (born 1685)
- 27 June – Jacques Claude Marie Vincent de Gournay, economist (born 1712)
- 24 July – Antoine Gaubil, Jesuit missionary in China (born 1689)
- 27 July – Pierre Louis Maupertuis, mathematician and philosopher (born 1698)
- 14 September – Louis-Joseph de Montcalm, military officer (born 1712)
- 16 September – Nicolas Antoine Boulanger, philosopher (born 1722)
- 18 October – Louis de Caix d'Hervelois, composer (born c.1670)
- 6 December – Princess Louise-Élisabeth of France, daughter of King Louis XV (born 1727)
