= Costunolide synthase =

Class of enzymes

Identifiers
- EC no.: 1.14.14.150

Databases
- IntEnz: IntEnz view
- BRENDA: BRENDA entry
- ExPASy: NiceZyme view
- KEGG: KEGG entry
- MetaCyc: metabolic pathway
- PRIAM: profile
- PDB structures: RCSB PDB PDBe PDBsum
Search
- PMC: articles
- PubMed: articles
- NCBI: proteins

Costunolide synthase (EC 1.14.14.150) is an enzyme with systematic name germacra-1(10),4,11(13)-trien-12-oate,NADPH:oxygen oxidoreductase (6alpha-hydroxylating). This enzyme catalyses the following chemical reaction

(+)-germacrene A acid
O_{2}
2 H_{2}O
costunolide

Costunolide synthase is a cytochrome P450 protein containing heme. It requires a partner cytochrome P450 reductase for functional expression. This uses nicotinamide adenine dinucleotide phosphate. The starting material for this sesquiterpene lactone is produced from (+)-germacrene A by the enzyme germacrene A hydroxylase.
