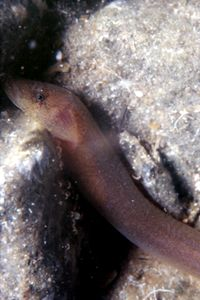

Conservation status
- Least Concern (IUCN 3.1)

Scientific classification
- Kingdom: Animalia
- Phylum: Chordata
- Class: Actinopterygii
- Order: Blenniiformes
- Family: Gobiesocidae
- Genus: Gouania
- Species: G. willdenowi

Binomial name
- Gouania willdenowi (A. Risso, 1810)

Synonyms
- Lepadogaster willdenowi Risso, 1810; Rupisuga nicensis Swainson, 1839; Lepadogaster latirostris Costa, 1850; Leptopterygius coccoi Troschel, 1860

= Blunt-snouted clingfish =

Species of fish

The blunt-snouted clingfish (Gouania willdenowi) is a species of clingfish found along the western Mediterranean Sea coasts from Spain to Italy. This species grows to a length of 5 centimetres (2.0 in) TL. The blunt-nosed clingfish is a little known species of shallow water along the littoral of the northern Mediterranean from Alicante to Sicily. Its range was formerly thought to extend to Israel and Syria in the east; however this was actually several closely related cryptic species. It can survive out of the water and occurs only among intertidal pebbles and sand.

This species was formerly the only known member of Gouania; however, a 2020 study described three new species and resurrected a synonym of G. willdenowi (G. pigra) to species status. It was described as Lepadogaster willdenowi by Antoine Risso in 1810 from a type locality of Nice, France, it was subsequently placed in the monotypic genus Covania by Giovanni Domenico Nardo in 1833 and this was corrected to Gouania in 1864 by Giovanni Canestrini. The generic name honours the French botanist Antoine Gouan (1733-1821), Nardo's original name Covania being a latinisation of Gouan, while the specific name honours another botanist, the German Carl Ludwig Willdenow (1765-1812).
