= Leptopterygius =

Leptopterygius may refer to:

- Leptopterygius Troschel, 1860, a junior synonym of the clingfish Gouania
- Leptopterygius Huene 1929, an ichthyosaur renamed Leptonectes due to the name being preoccupied by the above fish genus
