= Antoine Gouan =

French naturalist (1733–1821)

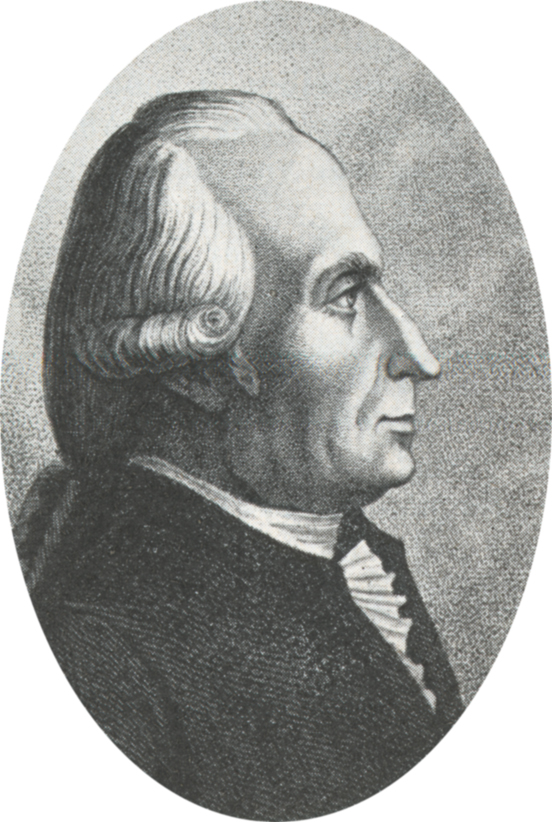
- Antoine Gouan
- Born: 15 November 1733; Montpellier
- Died: 1 September 1821 (aged 87); Montpellier
- Education: University of Montpellier
- Scientific career
- Fields: Botany; Ichthyology; Natural history
- Workplaces: Royal Swedish Academy of Sciences

Antoine Gouan (15 November 1733 – 1 September 1821) was a French naturalist who was a native of Montpellier. Gouan was a pioneer of Linnaean taxonomy in France.

He began his studies in Toulouse, later returning to Montpellier, where he studied medicine at the university. Here he was a student of François Boissier de Sauvages de Lacroix (1706–1767), an ardent supporter of Carl Linnaeus. In August 1752, Gouan received his doctorate under the chairmanship of Antoine Magnol (1676–1759), and subsequently practiced medicine at Saint-Éloi Hospital in Montpellier. Soon afterwards his interest turned to natural history.

In 1762 Gouan published a plant catalog of the botanical garden at Montpellier titled Hortus regius Monspeliensis. This publication was the first French botanical work that followed the binomial nomenclature of Linnaeus. In 1765 he penned Flora Monspeliaca, and became titulaire at the Montpellier Academy. During this period he attained a position at the botanical garden, and was in charge of collecting and classifying plant species. In 1770 he published an important ichthyological treatise called Historia Piscicum, a work that expanded the number of fish genera that existed in the Linnaean system.

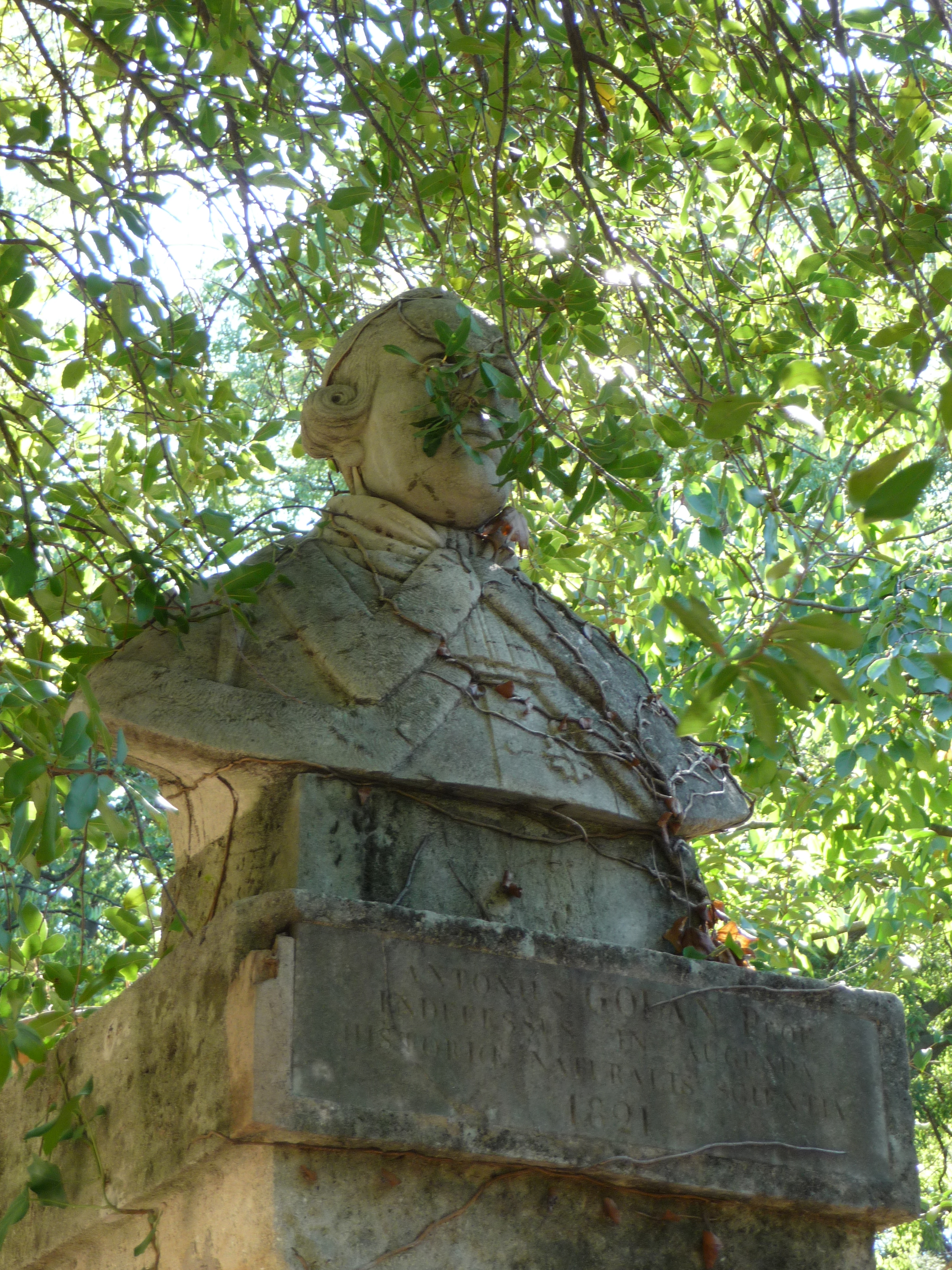
Bust of Gouan at Jardin Botanique de Montpellier.

In 1766 he succeeded Sauvages de Lacroix at the Faculty of Medicine, and in 1793 became a foreign member of the Linnean Society of London. During his career he maintained correspondence with several learned scientists and thinkers, which included in addition to Linnaeus; Albrecht von Haller (1708–1777), Jean Guillaume Bruguière (1750–1798), Jean-Jacques Rousseau (1712–1778), Carl Peter Thunberg (1743–1828), et al.

One of his students in Montpellier was Jacques Anselme Dorthès.

In 1790, he was elected a foreign member of the Royal Swedish Academy of Sciences.

Gouan is credited with planting the first ginkgo biloba in France, a tree that was given to him by naturalist Pierre Marie Auguste Broussonet (1761–1807). Today this tree is reportedly still standing in the botanical garden of Montpellier. During his career he amassed a large collection of algae that was harvested around Marseille.

== Taxa named in his honor ==
- Taxa with the specific epithet of gouanii commemorate his name, an example being Ranunculus gouanii (Gouan's Buttercup).
- Gouania is a genus of clingfishes endemic to the Mediterranean Sea that contains at least 5 cryptobenthic species. The genus is named for Gouan..
- Gouania is a genus of flowering plants in the family Rhamnaceae. The 50 to 70 species it contains are native to tropical and subtropical regions of the world, including Africa, Madagascar, the Indian Ocean islands, southern Asia, the Americas and Hawaii. They are shrubs or lianas.

== Taxa described by him ==
- See Category:Taxa named by Antoine Gouan
