= 1755 in France =

- Decades: 1730s; 1740s; 1750s; 1760s; 1770s
- See also: History of France; Timeline of French history; List of years in France

Events from the year 1755 in France.

== Incumbents ==
- Monarch – Louis XV

== Events ==
- Opéra national de Montpellier established
- Action of 8 June 1755

== Births ==
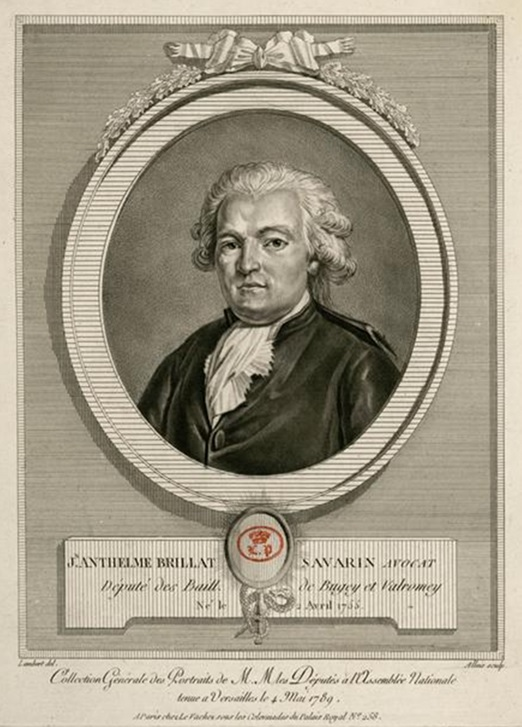
Jean Anthelme Brillat-Savarin

- 1 April – Jean Anthelme Brillat-Savarin, lawyer, politician and essayist (died 1826)
- 16 April – Élisabeth-Louise Vigée-Le Brun, French painter (died 1842)
- 2 November – Maria Antonia, Austrian Habsburg princess who would later marry the incumbent King Louis XVs grandson, Prince Louis-Auguste (the future Louis XVI). (died 1793)
- 16 November – Maximin Isnard, revolutionary (died 1825)
- 17 November – Prince Louis Stanislaus, grandson of the reigning King Louis XV and future Louis XVIII. (died 1824)

== Deaths ==
- 11 January – Joseph-Nicolas-Pancrace Royer, composer (born c.1705)
- 19 January – Jean-Pierre Christin, physicist, mathematician, astronomer and musician (born 1683)
- 24 April – Philip François Renault, explorer (born c.1686)
- 30 April – Jean-Baptiste Oudry, painter, engraver and tapestry designer (born 1686)
- 19 May – Jean Marie, Duke of Châteauvillain, nobleman (born 1748)
- 28 October – Joseph Bodin de Boismortier, composer (born 1689)
- 25 November – Jacques Caffieri, sculptor (born 1678)
- 29 December – Gabrielle-Suzanne Barbot de Villeneuve, writer (born c.1695)

=== Full date unknown ===
- Jean-Louis Lemoyne, sculptor (born 1665)
