= 1756 in France =

- Decades: 1730s; 1740s; 1750s; 1760s; 1770s
- See also: History of France; Timeline of French history; List of years in France

Events from the year 1756 in France.

== Incumbents ==
- Monarch – Louis XV

== Events ==
- 12 April – French invasion of Menorca, at this time under British control.
- 1 May – Treaty of Versailles.
- 18 May – The Seven Years' War formally begins when Great Britain declares war on France.
- 20 May – Battle of Minorca: The French fleet under Roland-Michel Barrin de La Galissonière defeats the British under John Byng.
- 29 June – The 2-month Siege of Fort St Philip at Mahón ends when the British garrison in Minorca surrenders to the French after two months' siege by Armand de Vignerot du Plessis.
- 14 August – French and Indian War: Fort Oswego falls to the French.

== Arts and literature ==
- François Boucher paints portraits of Madame de Pompadour.
- The Vincennes porcelain factory moves to Sèvres as the Manufacture nationale de Sèvres.

== Births ==
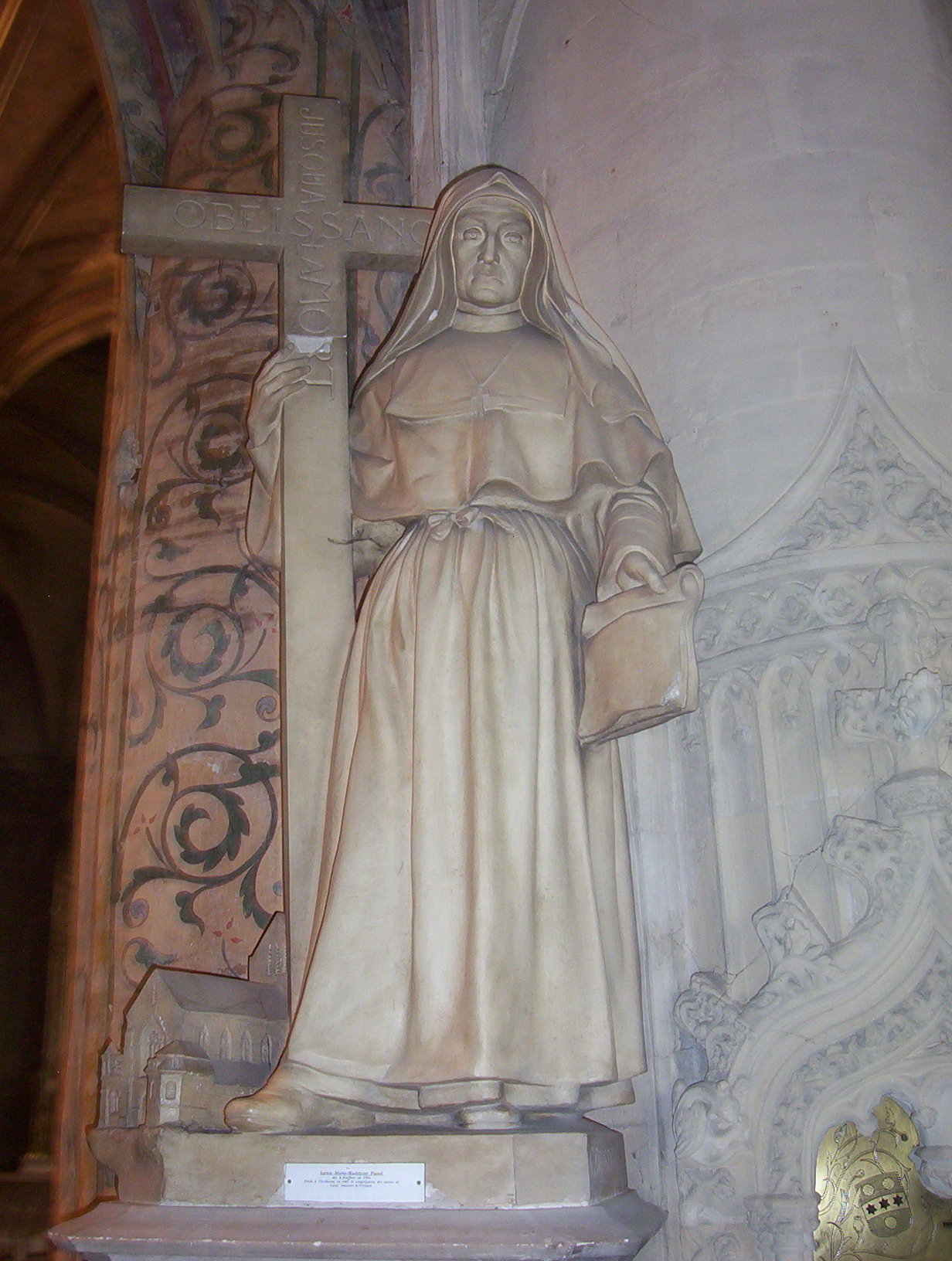
Statue of Marie-Madeleine Postel

- 3 January – Jérôme Pétion de Villeneuve, writer and politician (died 1794)
- 23 May – Charles Clément Balvay (called Bervic), engraver (died 1822)
- 28 November – Marie-Madeleine Postel, Roman Catholic saint (died 1846)
- 24 December – Joseph François Augustin Monneron, banker and politician (died 1826)

=== Full date unknown ===
- Antoine-François Momoro, printer, bookseller and politician (died 1794)

== Deaths ==
- 27 June – Marie Sallé, dancer and choreographer (born 1707)
- 16 April – Jacques Cassini, astronomer (born 1677)
