= 1758 in France =

- Decades: 1730s; 1740s; 1750s; 1760s; 1770s
- See also: History of France; Timeline of French history; List of years in France

Events from the year 1758 in France.

== Incumbents ==
- Monarch – Louis XV

== Events ==
=== The Seven Years' War ===
- 29 April – Battle of Cuddalore
- 12 June – Battle of Rheinberg
- 23 June – Battle of Krefeld
- 3 August – Battle of Negapatam
- 7–16 August – Raid on Cherbourg
- The French and Indian War, the North American theater of the worldwide Seven Years' War

== Popular culture ==
=== Theatre ===
- Le Père de famille, play by Denis Diderot

== Births ==
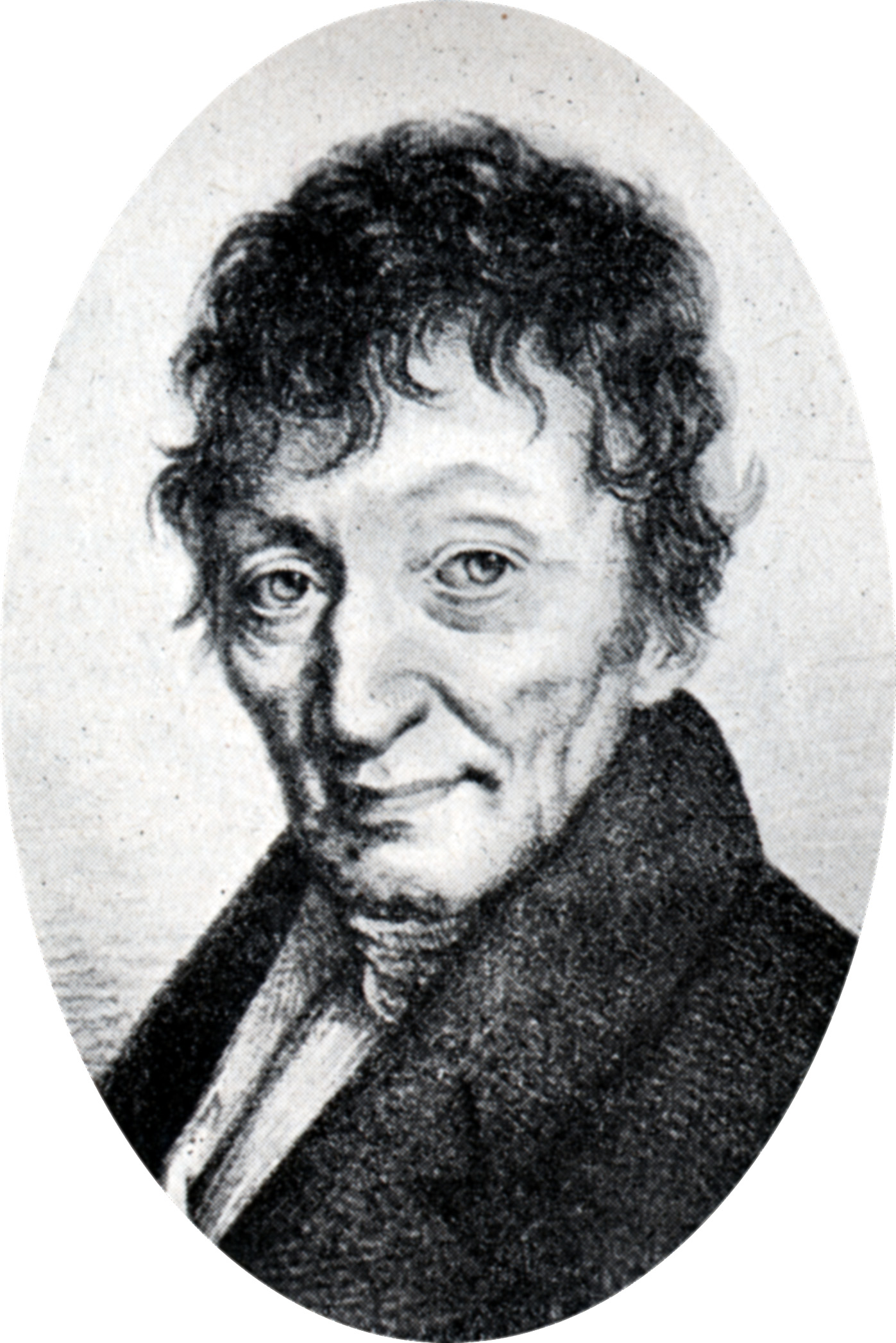
Louis-Marie Aubert du Petit-Thouars.

- 4 February – Pierre Gardel, ballet dancer, violinist, and composer (died 1840)
- 28 February – Nicolas François, Count Mollien, financier (died 1850)
- 22 March – Jean-Charles Monnier, military officer (died 1816)
- 6 May – Maximilien Robespierre, politician (died 1794)
- 8 July – Pierre Joseph Duhem, physician and politician (died 1807)
- 6 September – Pierre-Augustin Hulin, general (died 1841)
- 5 November – Louis-Marie Aubert du Petit-Thouars, botanist (died 1831)

=== Full date unknown ===
- Sophie Hus, stage actress (died after 1831)

== Deaths ==
- 18 January – François Nicole, mathematician, 74
- 18 February – Isaac-Joseph Berruyer, historian, 76
- 2 March – Pierre Guérin de Tencin, archbishop, 77
- 8 April – Louise Anne de Bourbon, countess, 62
- 22 April – Antoine de Jussieu, naturalist, 61
- 30 April – François d'Agincourt, harpsichordist, organist, and composer, 74?
- August – François Hutin, painter, sculptor, and engraver, 72?
