= 1757 in France =

- Decades: 1730s; 1740s; 1750s; 1760s; 1770s
- See also: History of France; Timeline of French history; List of years in France

Events from the year 1757 in France.

== Incumbents ==
- Monarch: Louis XV

== Events ==
- 5 January – Robert-François Damiens makes an unsuccessful assassination attempt on Louis XV. On 28 March Damiens is publicly executed by dismemberment, the last person in France to suffer this punishment.
- 1 February – Louis XV dismisses his two most influential advisers: his Secretary of State for War, the Comte d'Argenson and the Secretary of the Navy, Jean-Baptiste de Machault d'Arnouville, are both removed from office at the urging of the King's mistress, Madame de Pompadour.
- 2 February – At Versailles, representatives of the Russian Empire and the Austrian Empire enter into an alliance against Prussia.
- 3 February – Artist Robert Picault begins the rescue of the frescoes at the King's Chamber of the Palace of Fontainebleau before architect Ange-Jacques Gabrel begins renovations.
- 14 March – Seven Years' War: British Admiral Sir John Byng is executed by firing squad aboard HMS Monarch for breach of the Articles of War in failing to "do his utmost" at the Battle of Minorca (1756).
- 21 March – France signs an alliance treaty with Sweden and Austria in the multinational effort to remove King Frederick the Great, even though Queen Consort Ulrika of Sweden is Frederick's sister. Sweden agrees to contribute 25,000 troops to the Frenco-Austrian force.
- 16 April – In the wake of public unrest, the King's Council issues a decree that bars anyone from writing, printing anything that would tend toward émouvoir les esprits (stir up popular sentiment) against the government, with violations punishable by death.
- 1 May – France and Austria sign a second Treaty of Versailles, committing France to sending an additional 105,000 troops to the war against Prussia, and to pay expenses to Austria at the rate of 12 million florins annually.
- 26 July – Seven Years' War – Battle of Hastenbeck: An Anglo-Hanoverian army under the Duke of Cumberland is defeated by the French under Louis d'Estrées and forced out of Hanover.
- 3–9 August – French and Indian War: A French army under Louis-Joseph de Montcalm forces the English to surrender Fort William Henry. The French army's Indian allies slaughter the survivors for unclear reasons.
- 23 September – The "Raid on Rochefort" is carried out as a pre-emptive strike by Great Britain to neutralize France's Arsenal de Rochefort before the French Navy can carry out plans to invade England. Seven British ships sail in and capture the Île-d'Aix and its battery of cannons, effectively blocking the departure of any ships from the mouth of the Charante river.
- 5 November – Seven Years' War – Battle of Rossbach: Frederick defeats the French-Imperial army under the Duc de Soubise and Prince Joseph of Saxe-Hildburghausen, forcing the French to withdraw from Saxony.

== Births ==
- 6 September – Gilbert du Motier, Marquis de Lafayette, French soldier and statesman (d. 1834)
- 9 October – Prince Charles, future King of France and grandson of reigning monarch Louis XV (d. 1836 in the Austrian Empire)
- 21 October – Charles-Pierre Augereau, Marshal of France and duc de Castiglione (d. 1816)

== Deaths ==
- 9 January – Bernard Le Bovier de Fontenelle, French scientist and man of letters (b. 1657)
- 17 October – René Antoine Ferchault de Réaumur, French scientist (b. 1683)
- 25 October – Antoine Augustin Calmet, French theologian (b. 1672)
