= Germacrene =

Group of naturally occurring hydrocarbons

Germacrenes
- (–)-Germacrene A

Names
- IUPAC name (1E,5E,8S)-1,5-dimethyl-8-(prop-1-en-2-yl)cyclodeca-1,5-diene
- Other names: (−)-Germacrene A; (E,E)-Germacra-3,9,11-triene; (1E,5E,8S)-1,5-dimethyl-8-(1-methylethenyl)-1,5-cyclodecadiene; (S-(E,E))-1,5-dimethyl-8-(1-methylethenyl)-1,5-cyclodecadiene

Identifiers
CAS Number	A: 28387-44-2; B: 15423-57-1; C: 34323-15-4; D: 37839-63-7
3D model (JSmol)	Interactive image; A: Interactive image; B: Interactive image; C: Interactive image; E: Interactive image
Beilstein Reference	6500908 (A) 1864177 (D)
ChEBI	A: CHEBI:36517; B: CHEBI:5337; C: CHEBI:61478; D: CHEBI:49045
ChEMBL	B: ChEMBL448125
ChemSpider	A: 29776407; B: 4444852; D: 28288426
KEGG	A: C16141; B: C09672; C: C19747
PubChem CID	A: 9548705; B: 5281519; C: 25244915; D: 5373727; E: 10632030
- InChI: InChI=1S/C15H26/c1-12(2)15-10-8-13(3)6-5-7-14(4)9-11-15/h6,9,12,15H,5,7-8,10-11H2,1-4H3/b13-6+,14-9+/t15-/m0/s1 Key: YDLBHMSVYMFOMI-SDFJSLCBSA-N; InChI=1/C15H26/c1-12(2)15-10-8-13(3)6-5-7-14(4)9-11-15/h6,9,12,15H,5,7-8,10-11H2,1-4H3/b13-6+,14-9+/t15-/m0/s1 Key: YDLBHMSVYMFOMI-SDFJSLCBBV; A: InChI=1S/C15H24/c1-12(2)15-10-8-13(3)6-5-7-14(4)9-11-15/h6,9,15H,1,5,7-8,10-11H2,2-4H3/b13-6+,14-9+/t15-/m1/s1 Key: XMRKUJJDDKYUHV-DFSVIBJJSA-N; D: InChI=1S/C15H24/c1-12(2)15-10-8-13(3)6-5-7-14(4)9-11-15/h7-8,10,12,15H,3,5-6,9,11H2,1-2,4H3/b10-8-,14-7- Key: GAIBLDCXCZKKJE-BZXLUOIMSA-N; E: InChI=1S/C15H24/c1-12(2)15-10-8-13(3)6-5-7-14(4)9-11-15/h6,9,11,14-15H,1,5,7-8,10H2,2-4H3/b11-9+,13-6+ Key: OAOGSSAAVUPEKA-BMCYRRRCSA-N
- SMILES: C/C/1=C\CC/C(=C/C[C@H](CC1)C(C)C)/C; A: C/C/1=C\CC/C(=C/C[C@@H](CC1)C(=C)C)/C; B: C/C/1=C\CC/C(=C/CC(=C(C)C)CC1)/C; C: C/C/1=C\CC/C(=C/C=C(\CC1)/C(C)C)/C; E: CC\1CC/C=C(/CCC(/C=C1)C(=C)C)\C

Properties
Chemical formula	C_{15}H_{24}
Molar mass	204.357 g·mol^{−1}
Density	0.793 g/mL
Boiling point	236.4 °C (457.5 °F; 509.5 K)
- Except where otherwise noted, data are given for materials in their standard state (at 25 °C [77 °F], 100 kPa). Infobox references

Germacrenes are a group of naturally occurring volatile organic hydrocarbons of the sesquiterpene and cycloalkene class. They are typically produced in plants and have antimicrobial and insecticidal properties, though they also play a role as insect pheromones. Two prominent molecules are germacrene A and germacrene D.

== Structures ==
Germacrene has five structural isomers.

Germacrene isomers
(–)-Germacrene A	Germacrene B	Germacrene C	Germacrene D	Germacrene E

Germacrene A is chiral and both the (–)-(S) and (+)-(R) forms are found naturally. Germacrene D is also known in both enantiomeric forms.

== Natural occurrences ==
The essential oils of deadnettles (genus Lamium), hedgenettles (genus Stachys), and Clausena anisata are characterized by their high contents of germacrene D. Germacrene B is a major component of patchouli oil.

== Metabolism in plants ==
The germacrenes are precursors to sesquiterpene lactones. For example, the enzyme germacrene A hydroxylase in chicory converts (+)-germacrene A to a carboxylic acid which is the starting material for costunolide synthase, which converts it to costunolide:

(+)-germacrene A
Oxidase
(+)-germacrene A acid
Synthase
costunolide
