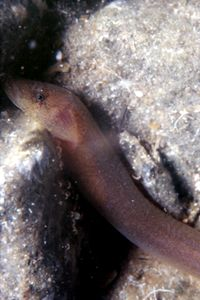
- Blunt-snouted Clingfish

Scientific classification
- Kingdom: Animalia
- Phylum: Chordata
- Class: Actinopterygii
- Order: Blenniiformes
- Family: Gobiesocidae
- Subfamily: Gobiesocinae
- Genus: Gouania; Nardo, 1833

Species
- See text

= Gouania (fish) =

Genus of fish

Gouania is a genus of clingfishes endemic to the Mediterranean Sea that contains at least 5 cryptobenthic species. The members of this genus are the only vertebrates to inhabit European intertidal gravel beaches and they have developed many adaptations to survive in this extremely harsh environment. They are a type of Clingfish meaning they form part of the family Gobiesocidae. All species of clingfish have a thoracic adhesive disc that allows them to hold on to both smooth and rough surfaces alike. This adaptation enables Gouania to survive the harsh conditions of gravel beaches, they are amongst the only fish taxa adapted to this habitat.

Formerly, the genus was considered to be a monotypic genus containing the blunt-snouted clingfish, however a 2020 study described three new species and resurrected a synonym of G. willdenowi (G. pigra).

== Etymology ==
The genus is named for the French botanist Antoine Gouan (1733–1821).

== Habitat ==
Gouania inhabit the interstitial part of gravel beaches, meaning that they live within the sediment. This demanding intertidal environment supposes extreme conditions such as mechanical stress from waves, desiccation from tides, and anthropogenic activity from tourism. Gouania have passive amphibious emergence behavior which is a common adaptation to desiccation in intertidal marine species. Their domain ranges from the intertidal up to 2 meters in depth.

== Distribution ==
All 5 species of Gouania are distributed along the three major Mediterranean Basins. Due to their stationary benthic lifestyle, adults do not have the ability to actively disperse but in their pelagic larval stage, they can passively disperse. Gouania larvae tend to stay close to shore and will rarely enter larger circulation systems that allow distant dispersals. Due to their restricted dispersal ability, each Gouania species has well-defined geographic distributions along the Mediterranean basins. G. adriatica can be found in the Adriatic Sea spanning all the way down to the northern Ionian Sea. The distribution of G. orientalis is limited to the oriental Mediterranean basin. Their range extends all along the Gulf of Corinth, the Aegean Sea, and the islands of Crete and Kythira. G. hofrichteri has the largest range and spreading along the eastern Mediterranean but mostly found in the northern and southern Ionian Sea. G. pigra is only found in the Adriatic Sea and is the only marine species endemic to this area.

== Anatomy and morphology ==
Gouania fish are small, growing up to 6 cm in length. As with most cryptobenthic species, they have an elongated body with small fins and eyes. Gouania was thought to be a monotypic genus partly due to the fact that all species of Gouania look almost identical. Geometric morphometric analyses have played an important role in the identification of species within the genera. There are two main morphotypes: slender-bodied and stout-bodied gouania. Eye size and the number of vertebrae further distinguish the species of Gouania. Gouania has the most vertebrae out of any European clingfish which makes them more flexible. This added flexibility allows Gouania to inhabit gravel beaches with smaller particles.

== Species ==
There are currently 5 described species in Gouania:

- Gouania adriatica M. Wagner, Kovačić & Koblmüller, 2020
- Gouania hofrichteri M. Wagner, Kovačić & Koblmüller, 2020
- Gouania orientalis M. Wagner, Kovačić & Koblmüller, 2020
- Gouania pigra (Nardo, 1827)
- Gouania willdenowi (Risso, 1810)
