= Jacques Anselme Dorthès =

French physician, entomologist and naturalist

- Born: July 19, 1759; Vauvert, Gard, France
- Died: 1794 (aged 34–35) (War of the Pyrenees)
- Education: University of Montpellier
- Occupations: Physician, entomologist, naturalist

Jacques Anselme Dorthès, born in Vauvert (Gard) on 19 July 1759 and died during the 1794 campaign of the Army of the Eastern Pyrenees, was a French physician, entomologist and naturalist.

== Biography ==
Destined to enter the orders, he abandoned the seminary in 1784 and turned to medicine.

He studied at the University of Montpellier where he became a doctor of medicine in 1787. At the same time, he became interested in entomology and botany, particularly with Antoine Gouan.

He participated unsuccessfully in the competition for the medicine professorship of 1789-1790 opened on the death of professors Jean Sabatier and Jean-Charles de Grimaud.

He died on active service during the campaign of 1794, when he had gone to serve voluntarily as a military doctor in hospitals.

== Works ==
On December 20, 1787, he read to the Royal Society of Sciences of Montpellier a memoir containing observations on a new genus of insect. The protonym Dorthesia, given to a scale insect, was created in its honour following this first description on the leaves of a euphorbia (Euphorbia charachias) near Nîmes. The species Dorthesia characias was described by Arsène Thiébaut de Berneaud.

John Obadiah Westwood described the species Dorthesia seychellarum later called Icerya seychellarum. The name Dorthesia was changed to Dorthezia and then to Orthezia.

The same year, he joined the Royal Society of Sciences of Montpellier. He successively published various productions relating to natural history and rural economy:

- Observations of a singular phenomenon, caused by a multitude of black ants (Formica nigra) gathered in the atmosphere, which they obscure like a cloud;
- Research on the pine processionary caterpillar;
- Memories on how to protect chestnut trees from caterpillar damage, on the insects that devour young plants, on those that damage wheat and alfalfa;
- Memory on the clematis (Clematis flammula) with which he proposes to form artificial meadows, to multiply and improve the fodder in his regions;
- Overview of the Mediterranean aggradations in the Lower Languedoc.

In 1788, he won the prize of the Royal Society of Sciences of Montpellier by writing the eulogy of Pierre Richer de Belleval.

He published a number of entomological articles in the “Mémoires de la Société royale d'agriculture de France” of which he was a corresponding member.

He was a member of the Linnean Society of London and he corresponded with James Edward Smith.

He was also a geologist. We owe him a dissertation on the rolled pebbles of the Rhône composed with the Baron de Servières and dissertations on other stones around Nîmes including variolite.

== Bibliography ==
- Dumas, C.L. (1809). Recueil des bulletins, publiés par la Société libre des sciences et belles-lettres de Montpellier (in French). Montpellier: Veuve Tournel et fils.
- Saucerotte, Constant (1887). Les Médecins pendant la Révolution (in French). Paris: Perrin. p. 192.
