= Pierre Magnol =

French botanist

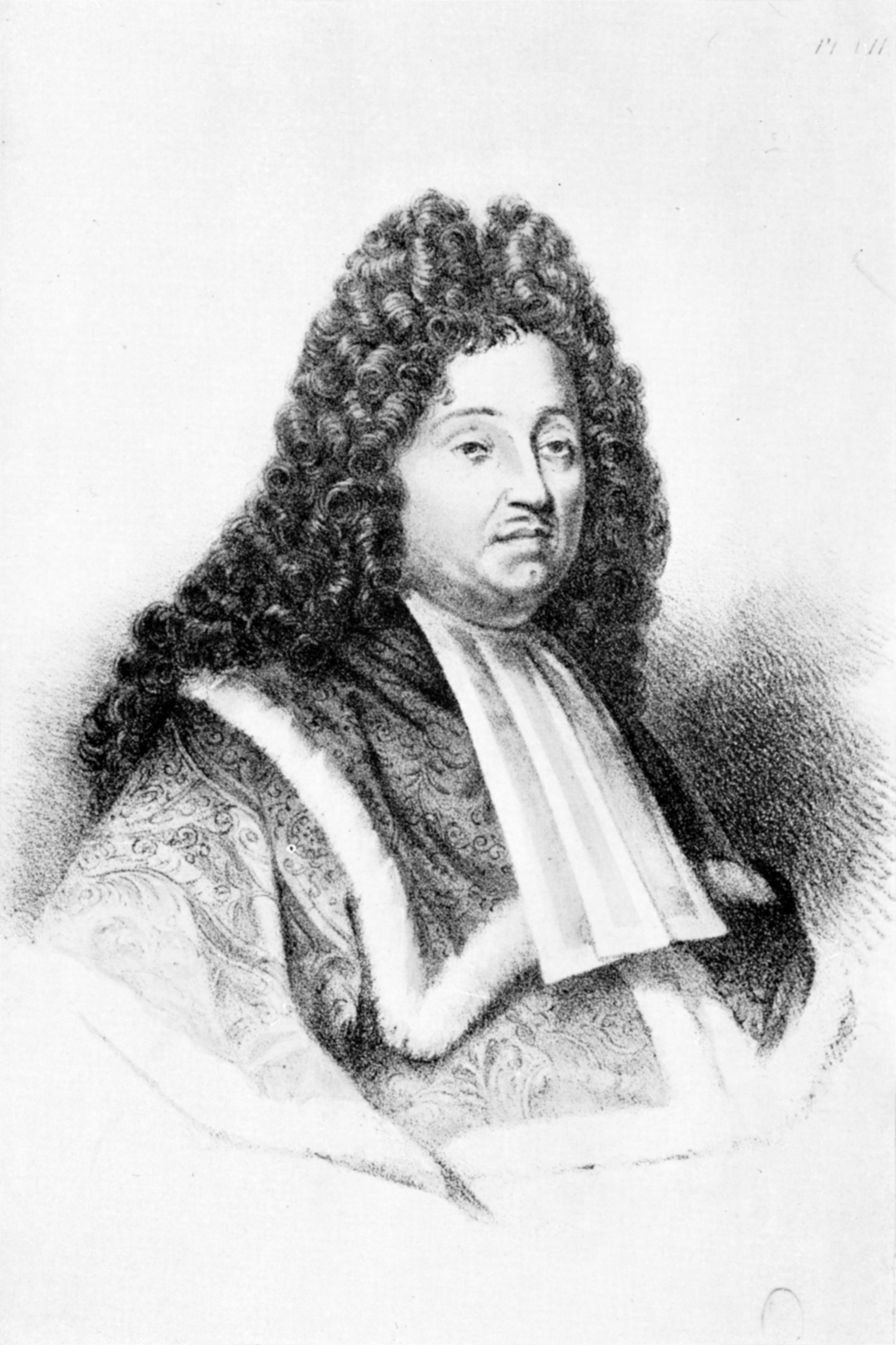
Pierre Magnol

Pierre Magnol (8 June 1638 – 21 May 1715) was a French botanist. He was born in the city of Montpellier, then in the province of Languedoc, where he lived and worked for most of his life. He became Professor of Botany and Director of the Royal Botanic Garden of Montpellier and held a seat in the Académie Royale des Sciences de Paris for a short while. He was one of the innovators who devised the botanical scheme of classification. He was the first to publish the concept of plant families as they are understood today, a natural classification of groups of plants that have features in common.

== Youth and education ==
Pierre Magnol was born into a family of apothecaries (pharmacists). His father Claude ran a pharmacy as did his grandfather Jean Magnol. Pierre's mother was from a family of physicians. Pierre's older brother Cesar succeeded his father in the pharmacy. Pierre, being one of the younger children, had more freedom to choose his own profession, and wanted to become a physician. He had become devoted to natural history and especially botany at an early stage in his life. He enrolled as a student in medicine at the University of Montpellier on 19 May 1655.

By Magnol's time the city of Montpellier was already long established as an important commercial and educational centre. The University of Montpellier was the first French university to establish a botanic garden, donated in 1593 by King Henry IV of France for the study of medicine and pharmacology. Its medical school attracted students from all over Europe. Individuals well-known in medicine and botany such as Leonhart Fuchs (1501–1566), Guillaume Rondelet (1507–1566), Charles de l'Ecluse (1526–1609), Pierre Richer de Belleval (c. 1564–1632), and the great writer (and doctor) François Rabelais (c. 1493–1553), all studied at this university. So it was in one of the intellectual and botanical capitals that Magnol took his education. He got his doctor's degree (M.D.) on 11 January 1659. After receiving his degree, his attention once again shifted to botany, this time even more seriously.

== Religion ==
Montpellier was a bastion of Protestantism and Magnol was raised in the tradition of Calvinism. At that time, Roman Catholicism was the official state church, but since the Edict of Nantes (1598), Protestants officially had religious freedom and the right to work in any field or for the state. However, the edict did not end religious persecution and discrimination, and Magnol was several times denied a position because of religious discrimination (see Career below).

With the revocation of the Edict of Nantes in 1685, Magnol renounced Protestantism and converted to Catholicism.

== Career ==
In December 1663 Magnol received the honorary title brevet de médecine royal through mediation of Antoine Vallot, an influential physician of the king. No means of his financial stability are mentioned (Magnol did not have a wealthy family to support him) but it is suggested that he was practicing medicine and had an income out of that. From 1659 on he devoted much of his time to the study of botany and made several trips through the Languedoc, the Provence, to the Alps and to the Pyrenees. In 1664 there was a vacancy for 'Demonstrator of plants' in Montpellier and Magnol was proposed for the position. He was denied the appointment because of religious discrimination. This happened again in 1667 when he was the leading candidate for the chair of Professor of medicine.

Meanwhile Magnol had contacts with many prominent botanist and was highly esteemed by his contemporaries. He corresponded with John Ray, William Sherard and James Petiver (England), Paul Hermann and Petrus Houttuyn (Leiden), Jan Commelin (Amsterdam), J.H. Lavater (Zürich) and J. Salvador (Barcelona), among others.

In 1687, after his conversion to Catholicism, Magnol eventually became 'Demonstrator of plants' at the botanic garden of Montpellier. In 1693, recommended by Guy-Crescent Fagon (1638–1718), then court physician, and his own student Joseph Pitton de Tournefort (1656–1708), he was nominated 'doctor to the kings court'. In 1694 he finally was appointed Professor of medicine at the University of Montpellier. Through intervention of Fagon, he received a brevet de professeur royale. Magnol was also appointed Director of the botanic garden in 1696, for a three-year period. After that, he received the title 'Inspector of the garden' for the rest of his life.

Magnol was one of the founding members of the Société Royale des Sciences de Montpellier (1706) and held one of the three chairs in botany. In 1709 he was called to Paris to occupy the seat in the Académie Royale des Sciences de Paris that was left empty when his former student Joseph Pitton de Tournefort died prematurely.

Among Magnol's students were Tournefort and the brothers Antoine and Bernard de Jussieu.

== Major contribution to science ==
Magnol's most important contribution to science is without doubt the invention of the concept of plant families, a natural classification, based on combinations of morphological characters, as set out in his Prodromus historiae generalis plantarum, in quo familiae plantarum per tabulas disponuntur (1689) (See under major works). His work may be regarded as one of the first steps towards the composition of a tree of life. In his Prodromus he developed 76 tables, which not only grouped plants into families but also allowed for an easy and rapid identification by means of the morphological characters, the same he used to compose the groups (Magnol, 1689).

== Major works ==
1676, Botanicum Monspeliense, sive Plantarum circa Monspelium nascentium index. Lyon. [Flora of Montpellier, or rather a list of the plants growing around Montpellier]

1686, Botanicum Monspeliense, sive Plantarum circa Monspelium nascentium index. Adduntur variarum plantarum descriptiones et icones. Cum appendice quae plantas de novo repertas continet et errata emendat. Montpellier. [Flora of Montpellier, or rather a list of the plants growing around Montpellier, with descriptions and plates of several plants added. With an appendix that contains plants newly found and corrects previous errors]

1689, Prodromus historiae generalis plantarum, in quo familiae plantarum per tabulas disponuntur. Montpellier. [Precursor to a general history of plants, in which the families of plants are arranged in tables]

1697, Hortus regius Monspeliense, sive Catalogus plantarum quae in Horto Regio Monspeliensi demonstrantur. Montpellier. [The royal garden of Montpellier, or rather a catalogue of the plants that are on show in the royal garden of Montpellier]

1720, Novus caracter [sic] plantarum, in duo tractatus divisus: primus, de herbis & subfructibus, secundus, de fructibus & arboribus. Montpellier, posthumous edition, attended to by his son, Antoine Magnol (1676–1759). [New character of plants, divided into two treatises: the first on herbs and small shrublike plants, the second on shrubs and trees]

== Eponymy ==
In 1703 Charles Plumier (1646–1704) named a flowering tree from the island of Martinique Magnolia, after Magnol. The name was later adopted by William Sherard, when he did the nomenclatural parts of Hortus Elthamensis by Johann Jacob Dillenius, and The Natural History of Carolina by Mark Catesby, to denote a flowering tree now known as Magnolia virginiana, taking it for the same species as that described by Plumier. Linnaeus took over this name in the first edition of Species plantarum, including references to both Plumier's and Sherard's names. In this way, Magnolia became the generally recognized name of a large genus of ornamental flowering trees.

== Notes and references ==
- Aiello, T (2003). "Pierre Magnol: His life and works". Magnolia, the Journal of the Magnolia Society. 38 (74): 1–10.
