= Germacrene A hydroxylase =

Class of enzymes

Identifiers
- EC no.: 1.14.14.95

Databases
- IntEnz: IntEnz view
- BRENDA: BRENDA entry
- ExPASy: NiceZyme view
- KEGG: KEGG entry
- MetaCyc: metabolic pathway
- PRIAM: profile
- PDB structures: RCSB PDB PDBe PDBsum
Search
- PMC: articles
- PubMed: articles
- NCBI: proteins

Germacrene A hydroxylase (EC 1.14.14.95) is an enzyme with systematic name (+)-germacrene-A,NADPH:oxygen oxidoreductase (12-hydroxylating). It catalyses a sequence of three oxidation reactions. The first converts (+)-germacrene A to an alcohol by addition of a hydroxy group:

(+)-germacrene A
O_{2}
H_{2}O
hydroxy derivative

Germacrene A hydroxylase is a cytochrome P450 protein containing heme. It requires a partner cytochrome P450 reductase for functional expression. This uses nicotinamide adenine dinucleotide phosphate. After two further oxidation steps, the product is germacrene A acid.

hydroxy derivative
2 steps
(+)-germacrene A acid

The product is further converted in chicory plants to a sesquiterpene lactone.
