= Pierre Charles Baquoy =

French painter and engraver

- Born: 27 July 1759; Paris, France
- Died: 4 February 1829 (aged 69); Paris, France
- Known for: Painting, engraving

Pierre Charles Baquoy (27 July 1759 – 4 February 1829) was a French painter and engraver, known for depictions of famous historical characters.

Baquoy was born and died in Paris. In his time he was considered an eminent artist-engraver and among other things was a professor of drawing and an employee of the Musee Royal.

He was the illustrator of the Kehl edition of Voltaire and also produced some of the engravings for the 1788-1793 Complete Works of Rousseau (Émile and Theátre et Poesies)

He was also one of the painters depicting contemporary society in Paris for early fashion magazines such as the Journal des Dames et des Modes and "La Mesangere" (published between 1797 and 1839).

His drawings of this kind, like those of others such as the La Mesangere editor Pierre Antoine Leboux de la Mesangere, Paul Gavarni, Antoine Charles Horace Vernet and Louis-Marie Lanté are considered an essential resource for the study of the fashion and society of the time.
