= Costunolide =

Names
- Preferred IUPAC name (3aS,6E,10E,11aR)-6,10-Dimethyl-3-methylidene-3a,4,5,8,9,11a-hexahydrocyclodeca[b]furan-2(3H)-one

Identifiers
CAS Number	553-21-9
3D model (JSmol)	Interactive image
ChEBI	CHEBI:3900
ChEMBL	ChEMBL205612
ChemSpider	4444782
ECHA InfoCard	100.208.663
MeSH	(+)-Costunolide
PubChem CID	5281437
UNII	4IK578SA7Z
CompTox Dashboard (EPA)	DTXSID001029520
- InChI: InChI=1S/C15H20O2/c1-10-5-4-6-11(2)9-14-13(8-7-10)12(3)15(16)17-14/h5,9,13-14H,3-4,6-8H2,1-2H3/b10-5+,11-9+/t13-,14+/m0/s1 Key: RYLQFBHBWLLLL-AHNJNIBGSA-N
- SMILES: O=C/1O[C@@H]2/C=C(/CC/C=C(/CC[C@H]2C\1=C)C)C

Properties
Chemical formula	C_{15}H_{20}O_{2}
Molar mass	232.323 g·mol^{−1}
- Except where otherwise noted, data are given for materials in their standard state (at 25 °C [77 °F], 100 kPa). Infobox references

(+)-Costunolide is a naturally occurring sesquiterpene lactone, first isolated in Saussurea costus roots in 1960. It is also found in lettuce and chicory.

== Biosynthesis ==
It is synthesized through the mevalonate pathway, seen in Figure 1. The synthesis begins with the cyclization of compound 1, farnesyl pyrophosphate (FPP), which is mediated by a sesquiterpene cyclase, (+)-germacrene A synthase, to form compound 2, (+)-germacryl cation. Inside this same enzyme, a proton is lost to form 3, (+)-germacrene A. The isoprenyl side chain of (+)-germacrene A is then hydroxylated by (+)-germacrene A hydroxylase, which is a cytochrome P450 enzyme, to form 4. NAD(P)^{+} dependent hydrogenase(s) then oxidize 4, germacra-1(10),4,11(13)-trien-12-ol, through the intermediate 5, germacra-1(10),4,11(13)-trien-12-al to form compound 6, germacrene acid. The cytochrome P450 enzyme, (+)-costunolide synthase, which is a NADPH and O_{2} dependent enzyme, then oxidizes germacrene acid to give the alcohol intermediate, 7, which then cyclizes to form the lactone 8, (+)-costunolide.

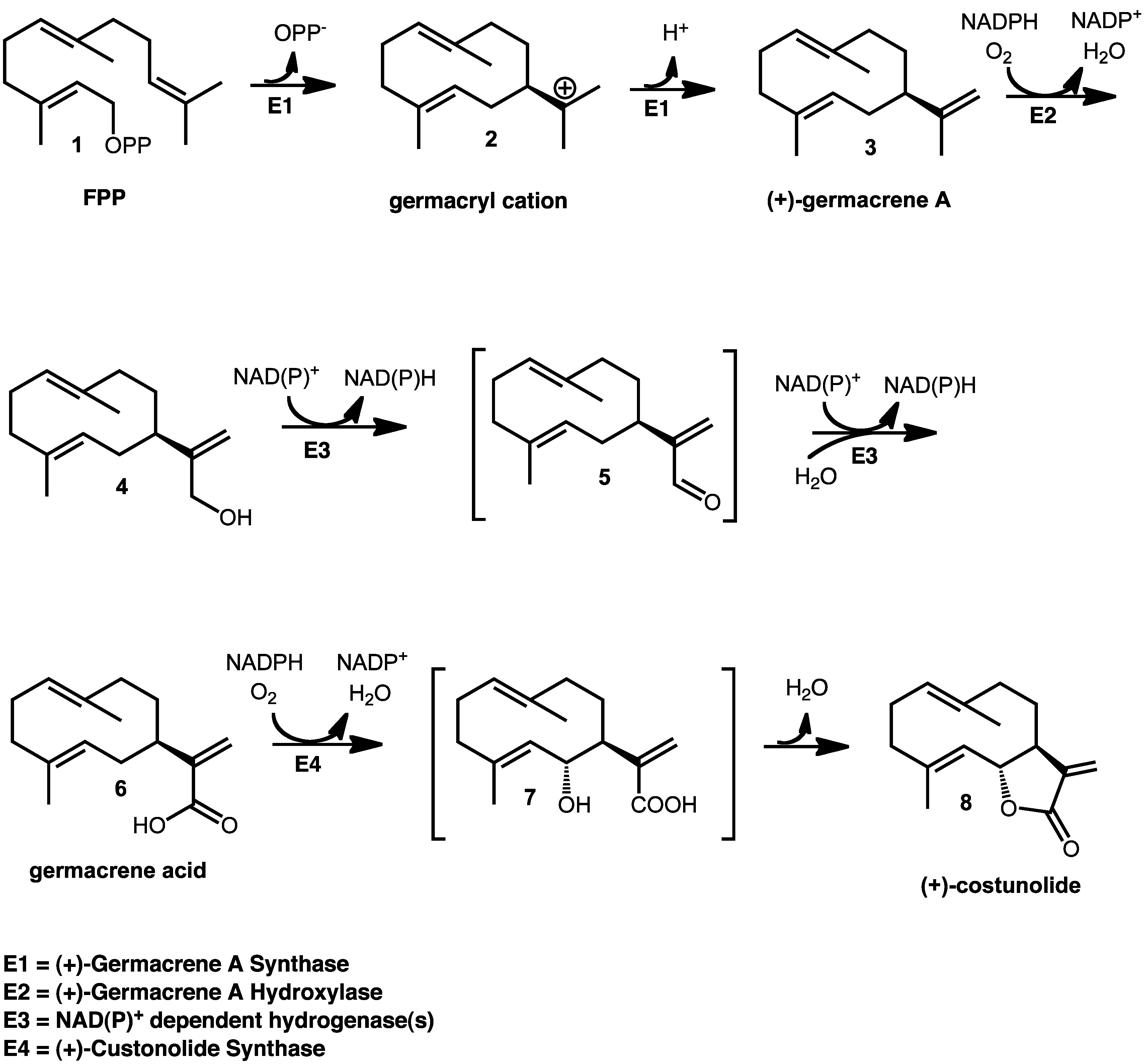
Figure 1. Biosynthesis of (+)-costunolide.
