= Antoine Magnol =

French physician and botanist

Antoine Magnol (1676 – 10 March 1759) was a French physician and botanist born in Montpellier, Languedoc. He was the son of the notable botanist Pierre Magnol (1638–1715).

In 1696 he obtained his medical doctorate, and in 1715 became a full professor at the University of Montpellier. Antoine Magnol maintained a professorship at Montpellier in an official capacity for many years.

== Published works ==
He is known for posthumous edition of his father's works, especially the 1720 publication of Novus caracter [sic] plantarum. Other written works associated with Antoine Magnol include:

- Quaestio medica: an diaphoretica lethargo, (1710; August Moreau, thesis/dissertation).
- Dissertatio de naturali secretione bilis in jecore (Montpellier, 1719; Bernard de Jussieu, dissertation, Antoine Magnol: praeses).
- Quaestio medico-chirurgica, an cataractae confirmatae, operatio chirurgica unicum remedium, (1731; Pierre Laulanié: respondent, dissertation).
- De natura et causis fluiditatis sanguinis naturalis et deperditæ (Montpellier, 1741, with Louis Laugier).
