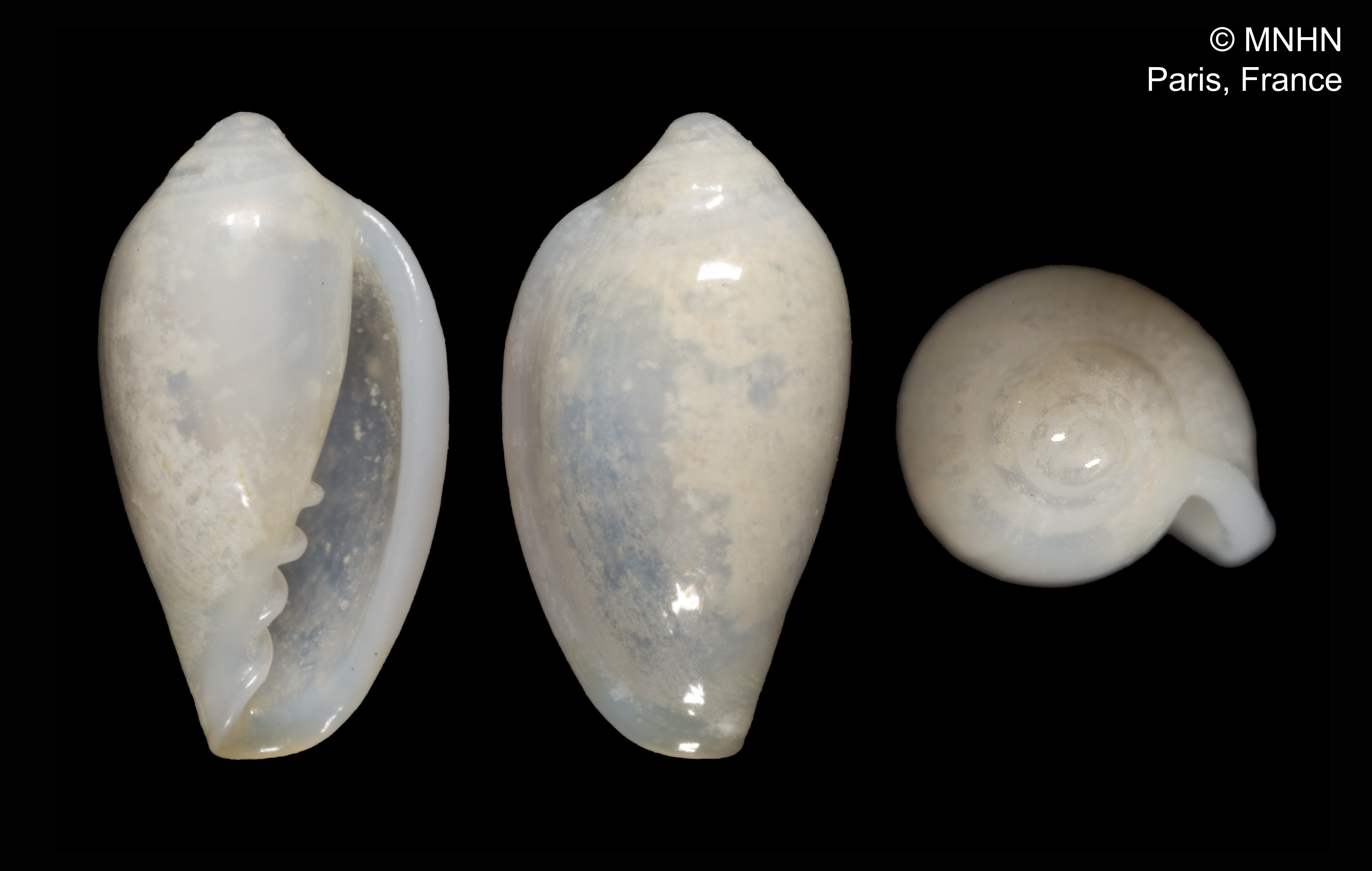
- Shell of Serrata arcuata (holotype at MNHN, Paris)

Scientific classification
- Kingdom: Animalia
- Phylum: Mollusca
- Class: Gastropoda
- Subclass: Caenogastropoda
- Order: Neogastropoda
- Family: Marginellidae
- Genus: Serrata
- Species: S. arcuata

Binomial name
- Serrata arcuata Boyer, 2008

= Serrata arcuata =

Species of gastropod

Serrata arcuata is a species of sea snail, a marine gastropod mollusc in the family Marginellidae, the margin snails.

== Etymology ==
The Latin arcuatus refers to the curved labrum of the species.

== Description ==
The shell has an asymmetrical outline curved on the right side. The length of the shell attains 5.1 mm and has an opaque colour. In the shape of the aperture and outer lip, S. arcuata fits in the Serrata hians group.

== Distribution ==
This marine species occurs off New Caledonia (depth range 250–300 m.).
