= S. robusta =

S. robusta may refer to:

- Sauvagella robusta, a fish species endemic to Madagascar
- Scaphella robusta, a sea snail species
- Serrata robusta, a sea snail species
- Shorea robusta, the sal or shala tree, a tree species
- Sillago robusta, the stout whiting, the yellow-cheek whiting or school whiting, a benthic marine fish species endemic to Australia

== Synonyms ==
- Stipa robusta, a synonym for Achnatherum robustum, the sleepy grass, a perennial plant species found in the U.S. Midwest

== See also ==
- Robusta
