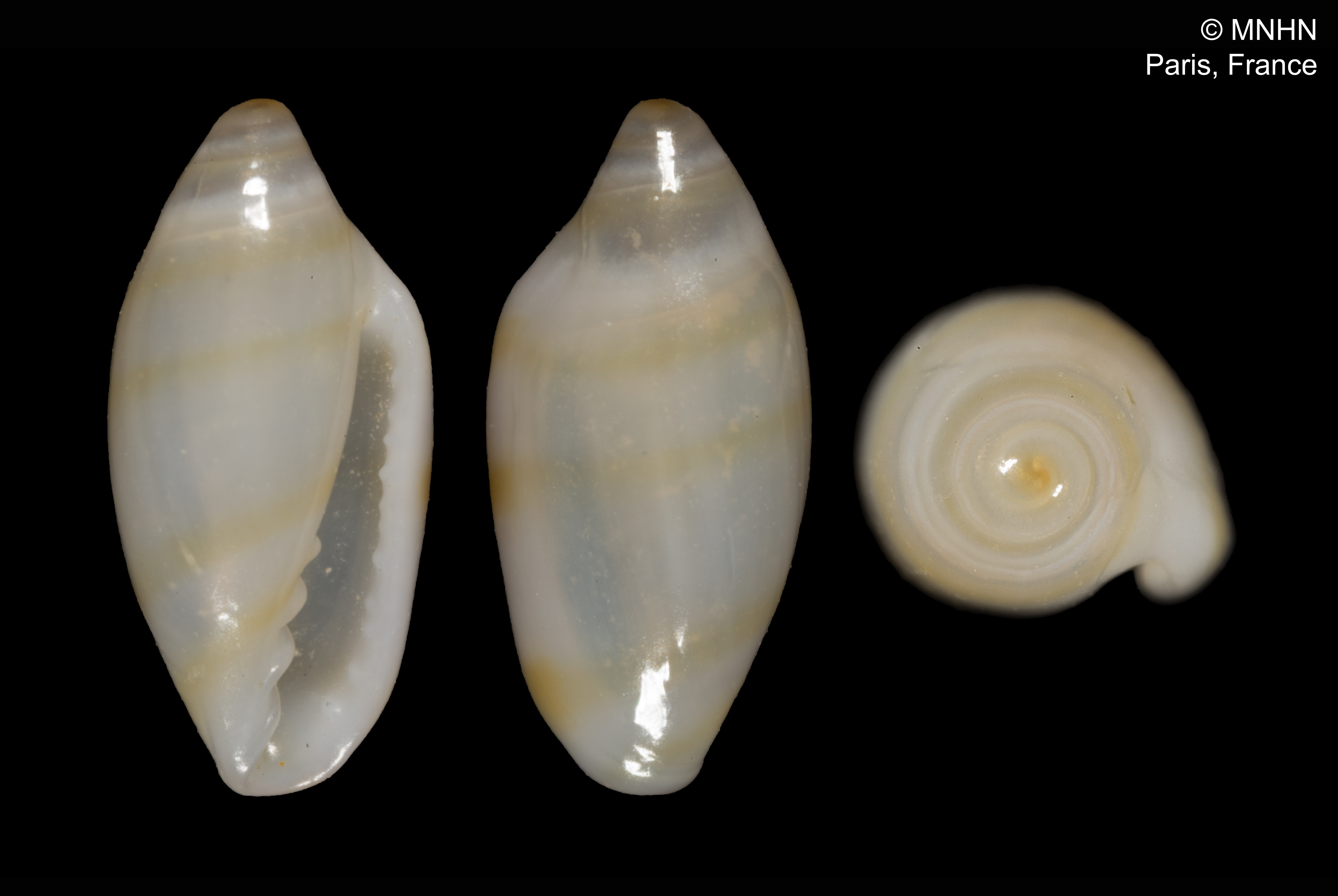
- Shell of Serrata boucheti (holotype at MNHN, Paris)

Scientific classification
- Kingdom: Animalia
- Phylum: Mollusca
- Class: Gastropoda
- Subclass: Caenogastropoda
- Order: Neogastropoda
- Family: Marginellidae
- Genus: Serrata
- Species: S. boucheti

Binomial name
- Serrata boucheti (Boyer, 2001)

Synonyms
- Haloginella boucheti Boyer, 2001

= Serrata boucheti =

Species of gastropod

Serrata boucheti is a species of sea snail, a marine gastropod mollusc in the family Marginellidae, the margin snails.

== Description ==
The length of the shell attains 5.15 mm. It was originally described in the genus Haloginella. It is considered a typical species of the group Serrata. This species has a tiny shell with a slender outline and a shell decoration usually made up of 3 to 4 orange bands.

== Distribution ==
This marine species occurs off south and south-eastern parts of New Caledonia.
