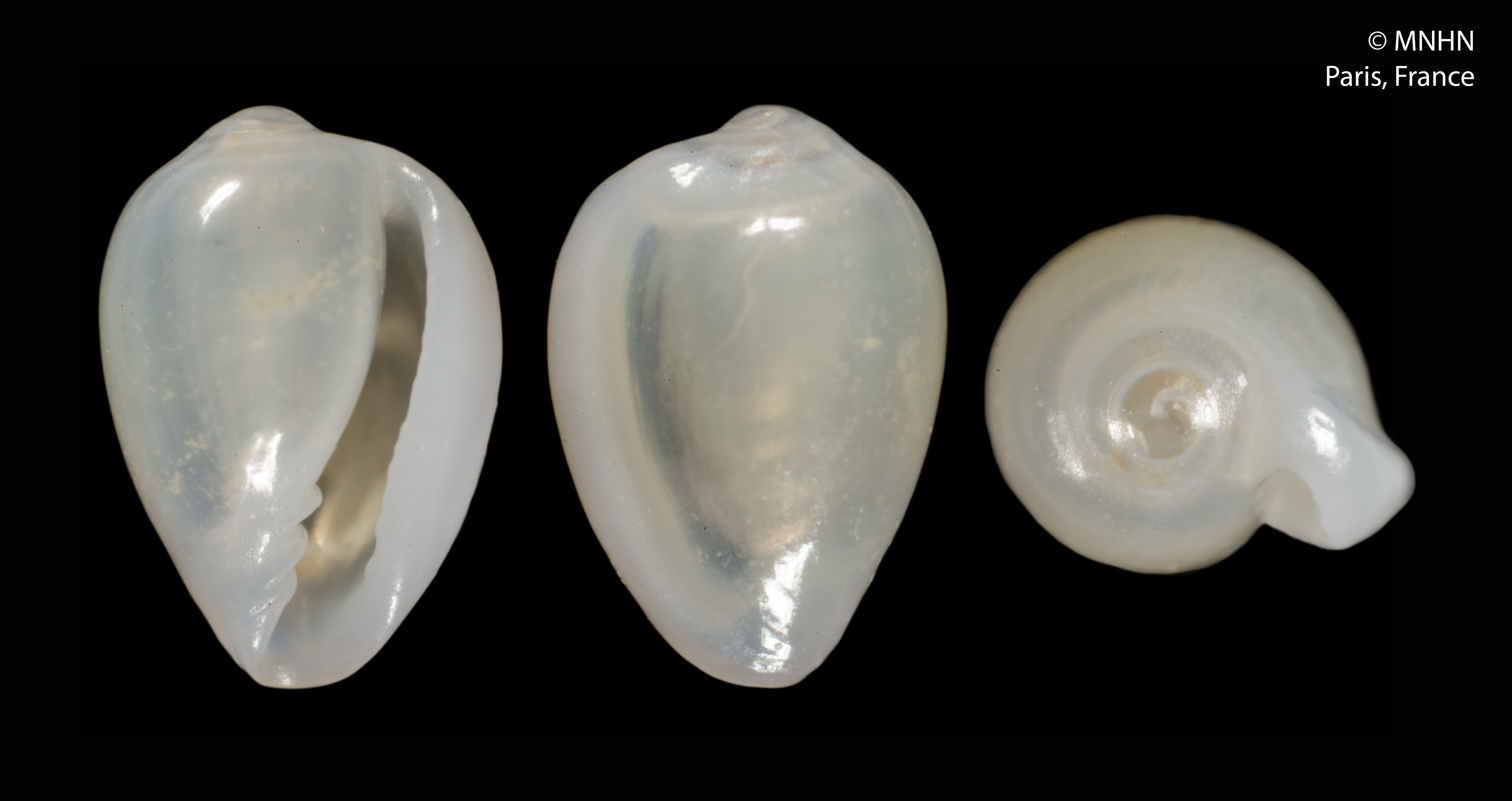
- Shell of Serrata inflata (holotype at MNHN, Paris)

Scientific classification
- Kingdom: Animalia
- Phylum: Mollusca
- Class: Gastropoda
- Subclass: Caenogastropoda
- Order: Neogastropoda
- Family: Marginellidae
- Genus: Serrata
- Species: S. inflata

Binomial name
- Serrata inflata Boyer, 2008

= Serrata inflata =

Species of gastropod

Serrata inflata is a species of sea snail, a marine gastropod mollusc in the family Marginellidae, the margin snails, part of the subfamily Austroginellinae.

== Taxonomy ==
Serrata inflata was described by French malacologist Franck Boyer in 2008 in his major revision The genus Serrata Jousseaume, 1875 (Caenogastropoda: Marginellidae) in New Caledonia published in Tropical Deep-Sea Benthos 25, Mémoires du Muséum national d'Histoire naturelle 196: 389–436.

The genus Serrata was established by Jousseaume in 1875, with Serrata serrata (Gaskoin, 1849) as type species. Boyer recognized 35 species of Serrata from the bathyal zone of New Caledonia in this work, of which four had been previously described in other genera and 31 were described as new, including S. inflata. This increased five-fold the Recent diversity known in the genus at the time.

The family Marginellidae is placed within the superfamily Volutoidea and order Neogastropoda. Members are characterized by small, glossy and polished shells, a thickened outer lip often with internal denticles, and strong plaits on the columella.

== Description ==
The holotype, which remains the only known specimen, measures 2.25 mm in length (MNHN-IM-2000-20619), making Serrata inflata one of the smallest members of the genus in New Caledonia.

As is typical for the genus Serrata, the shell is characterized by:

- a minute, solid and opaque to subtranslucent shell
- a glossy, polished surface without periostracal sculpture
- a paucispiral protoconch
- an ovate to biconical outline; in this species distinctly inflated, as reflected by the specific epithet inflata
- a narrow aperture widening slightly toward the base
- an outer lip that is moderately thickened and slightly reflected, with internal denticulation
- several columellar plaits (typically 4-5 in the genus) decreasing in size posteriorly

The shell is whitish to cream in ground color in the preserved holotype (as seen in the MNHN photographs). The spire is low to moderately elevated, with flat to slightly convex whorls. The body whorl is strongly inflated and dominates the total shell height, giving the species a bulbous appearance compared to the more slender or fusiform species such as S. fusulina or S. cylindrata described in the same paper.

Like other marginellids, S. inflata is inferred to be a carnivorous micro-predator, feeding on small invertebrates such as polychaete worms and small crustaceans using a rachiglossate radula and an extensible proboscis, although the radula of this species is currently unknown due to the paucity of material.

== Distribution and habitat ==
This marine species is endemic to New Caledonia and occurs in the bathyal zone off the northeastern coast.

Type locality: Passe de Hienghu, northeastern New Caledonia, 20°33′S, 165°00′E, at 270-282 m depth [BATHUS 1: stn DW 688].

Collection data: collected on 16 March 1993 during the BATHUS 1 expedition aboard R/V Alis, by Bouchet & Richer de Forges-IRD.

According to WoRMS, the known depth range is 270-282 m. This places it in the upper bathyal zone, on the outer continental shelf / upper slope. The benthic habitat in this region is characterized by mixed sandy-muddy bottoms and hard substrates associated with the New Caledonian barrier reef passes.

Boyer noted that 31% of the Serrata species identified from New Caledonia were represented in collections by only a single specimen, indicating that deep-sea diversity in the region remains very incompletely known, and S. inflata appears to belong to this category, being known only from its holotype.

== Type material ==
- Holotype: MNHN-IM-2000-20619, size 2.25 mm, dry shell (dd), deposited in the Muséum national d'Histoire naturelle, Paris. Formerly figured as Fig. 39 in Boyer (2008: p. 415-416).

No paratypes were designated.

== Etymology ==
The specific epithet inflata is from Latin inflatus meaning inflated or swollen, referring to the markedly inflated, bulbous body whorl that distinguishes this species from its congeners.
