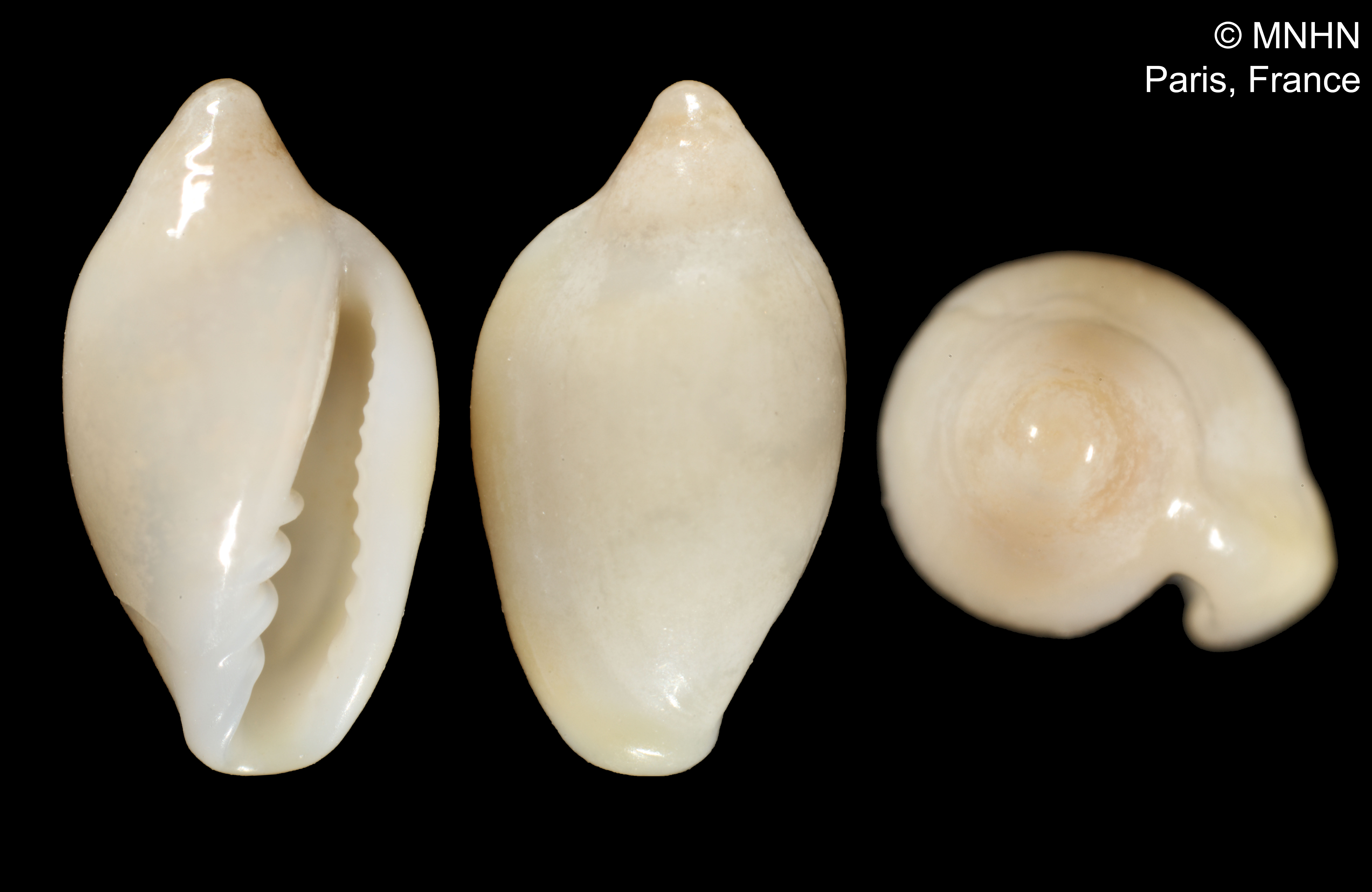
- Shell of Serrata orientalis (holotype at MNHN, Paris)

Scientific classification
- Kingdom: Animalia
- Phylum: Mollusca
- Class: Gastropoda
- Subclass: Caenogastropoda
- Order: Neogastropoda
- Family: Marginellidae
- Genus: Serrata
- Species: S. orientalis

Binomial name
- Serrata orientalis Boyer, 2008

= Serrata orientalis =

Species of gastropod

Serrata orientalis is a species of sea snail, a marine gastropod mollusc in the family Marginellidae, the margin snails. It is an accepted species name in the World Register of Marine Species.

== Description ==
The length of the shell attains 5.1 mm.

== Distribution ==
This marine species occurs off New Caledonia (depth 440 m.).
