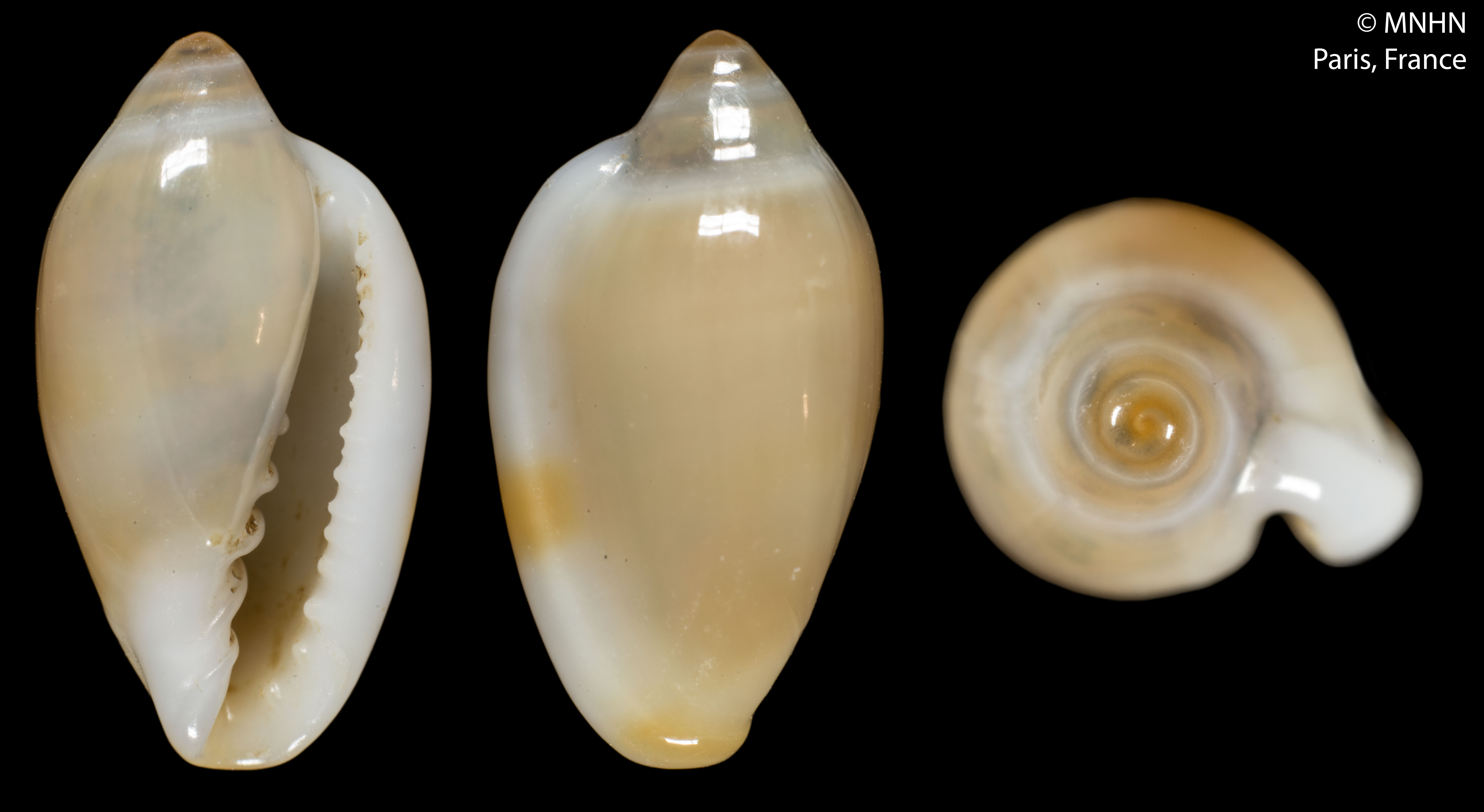
- Shell of Serrata tuii (holotype at MNHN? Paris)

Scientific classification
- Kingdom: Animalia
- Phylum: Mollusca
- Class: Gastropoda
- Subclass: Caenogastropoda
- Order: Neogastropoda
- Family: Marginellidae
- Genus: Serrata
- Species: S. tuii

Binomial name
- Serrata tuii (Cossignani, 2001)

Synonyms
- Hydroginella tuii Cossignani, 2001

= Serrata tuii =

Species of gastropod

Serrata tuii is a species of sea snail, a marine gastropod mollusc in the family Marginellidae, the margin snails.Like other members of its genus, it is characterized by a glossy, polished shell and a highly specialized anatomy adapted for life in deep-water marine environments.

== Description ==
The size of the shell of a Serrata tuii sea snail reaches 10 mm, this shell has a distinct shiny outer surface.

== Distribution ==
This marine species occurs off New Caledonia.
