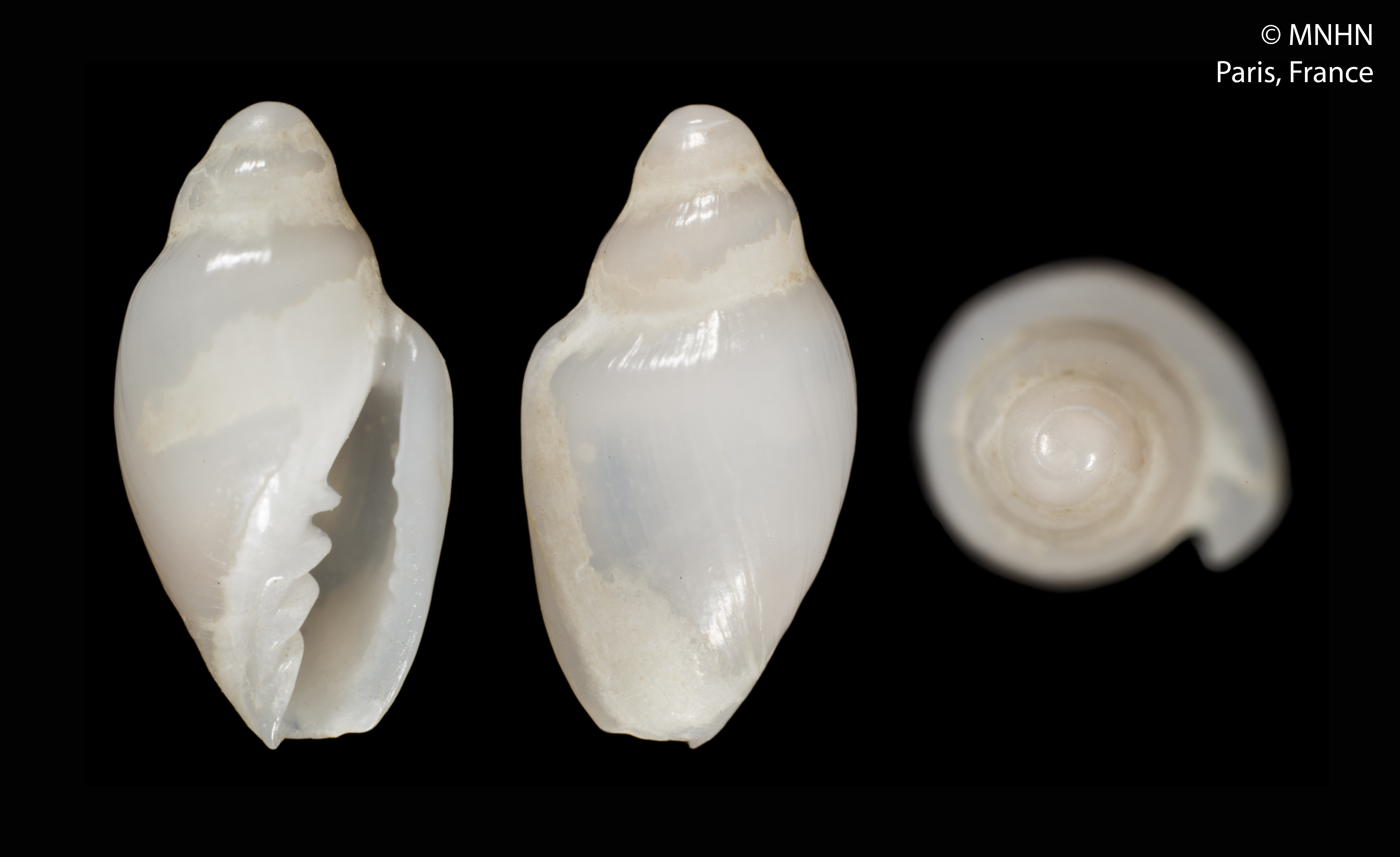
- Shell of Serrata gradata (holotype at MNHN, Paris)

Scientific classification
- Kingdom: Animalia
- Phylum: Mollusca
- Class: Gastropoda
- Subclass: Caenogastropoda
- Order: Neogastropoda
- Family: Marginellidae
- Genus: Serrata
- Species: S. gradata

Binomial name
- Serrata gradata Boyer, 2008

= Serrata gradata =

Species of sea snail

Serrata gradata is a species of sea snail, a marine gastropod mollusc in the family Marginellidae—the margin snails.

== Description ==
The length of the shell attains 5.2 millimetres (0.20 in).

== Distribution ==
This marine specie soccurs off New Caledonia (depth range 613-647 m).
