= Serrata tahanea =

Scientific classification
- Kingdom: Animalia
- Phylum: Mollusca
- Class: Gastropoda
- Subclass: Caenogastropoda
- Order: Neogastropoda
- Family: Marginellidae
- Genus: Serrata
- Species: S. tahanea

Binomial name
- Serrata tahanea Wakefield, Boyer & McCleery, 2002

Species of gastropod

Serrata tahanea is a species of sea snail, a marine gastropod mollusc in the family Marginellidae, the margin snails. The species occurs only in the lagoon of Tahanea and Faaite Atolls in the Tuamotus, where it occurs in crevices among dead coral. Its body shape resembles that of S. translata, from which it differs by way of its uniform golden-brown coloration (versus the distinct three bands on the body whorl S. translata), smaller labial denticles, and also in its small size (3.5-4.0 mm) compared to other allied Serrata species.
