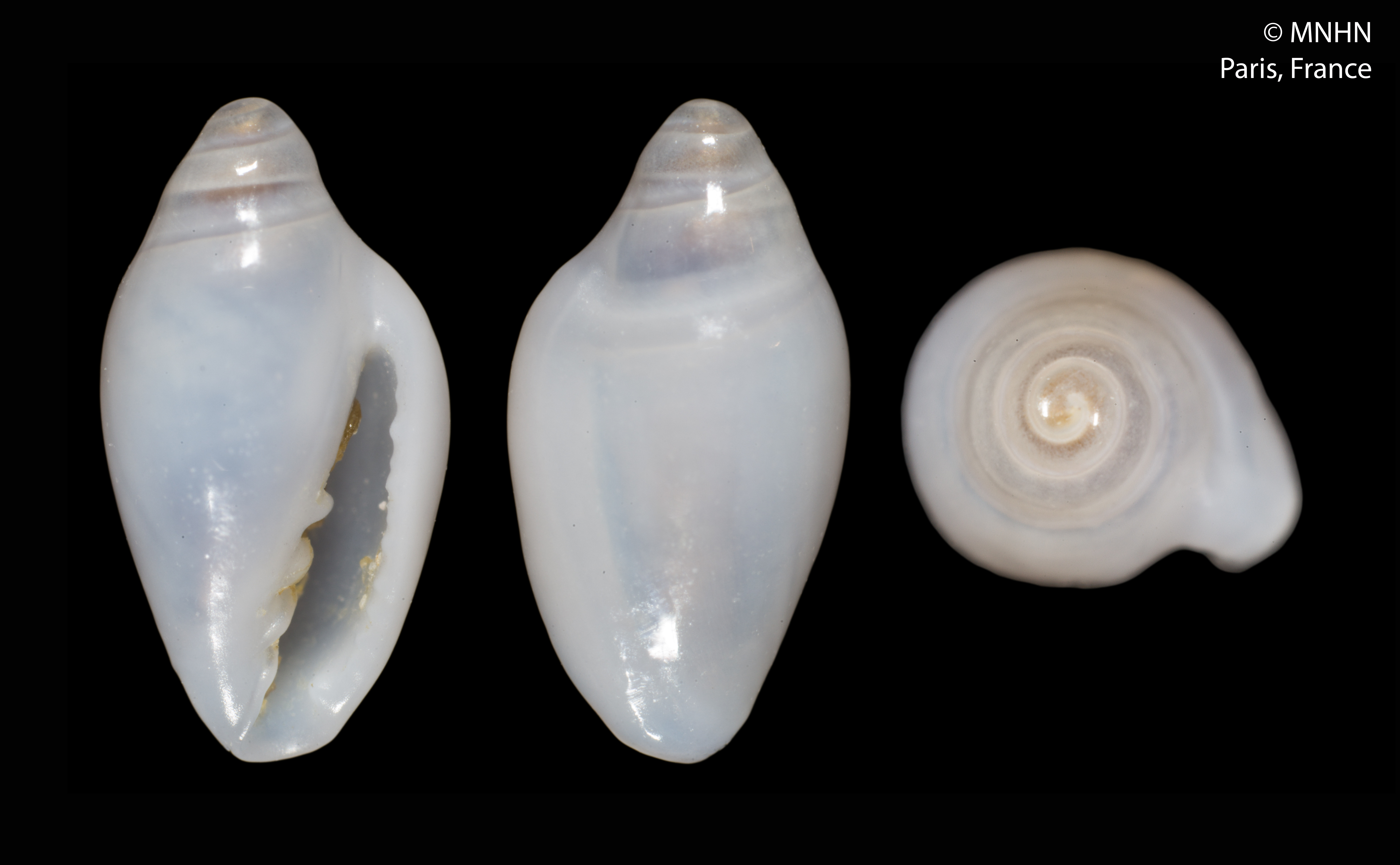
- Shell of Serrata stylaster (holotype at MNHN, Paris)

Scientific classification
- Kingdom: Animalia
- Phylum: Mollusca
- Class: Gastropoda
- Subclass: Caenogastropoda
- Order: Neogastropoda
- Family: Marginellidae
- Genus: Serrata
- Species: S. stylaster

Binomial name
- Serrata stylaster (Boyer, 2001)

Synonyms
- Dentimargo stylaster Boyer, 2001 (basionym)

= Serrata stylaster =

Species of gastropod

Serrata stylaster is a species of sea snail, a marine gastropod mollusc in the family Marginellidae, the margin snails.

== Description ==
The shell dimensions are in length of 4.7 mm and width of 2.35 mm. It is ovate bicanonical in shape and opaque. The color is white, spire pale golden.

== Distribution ==
This species occurs in the Pacific Ocean off New Caledonia.
