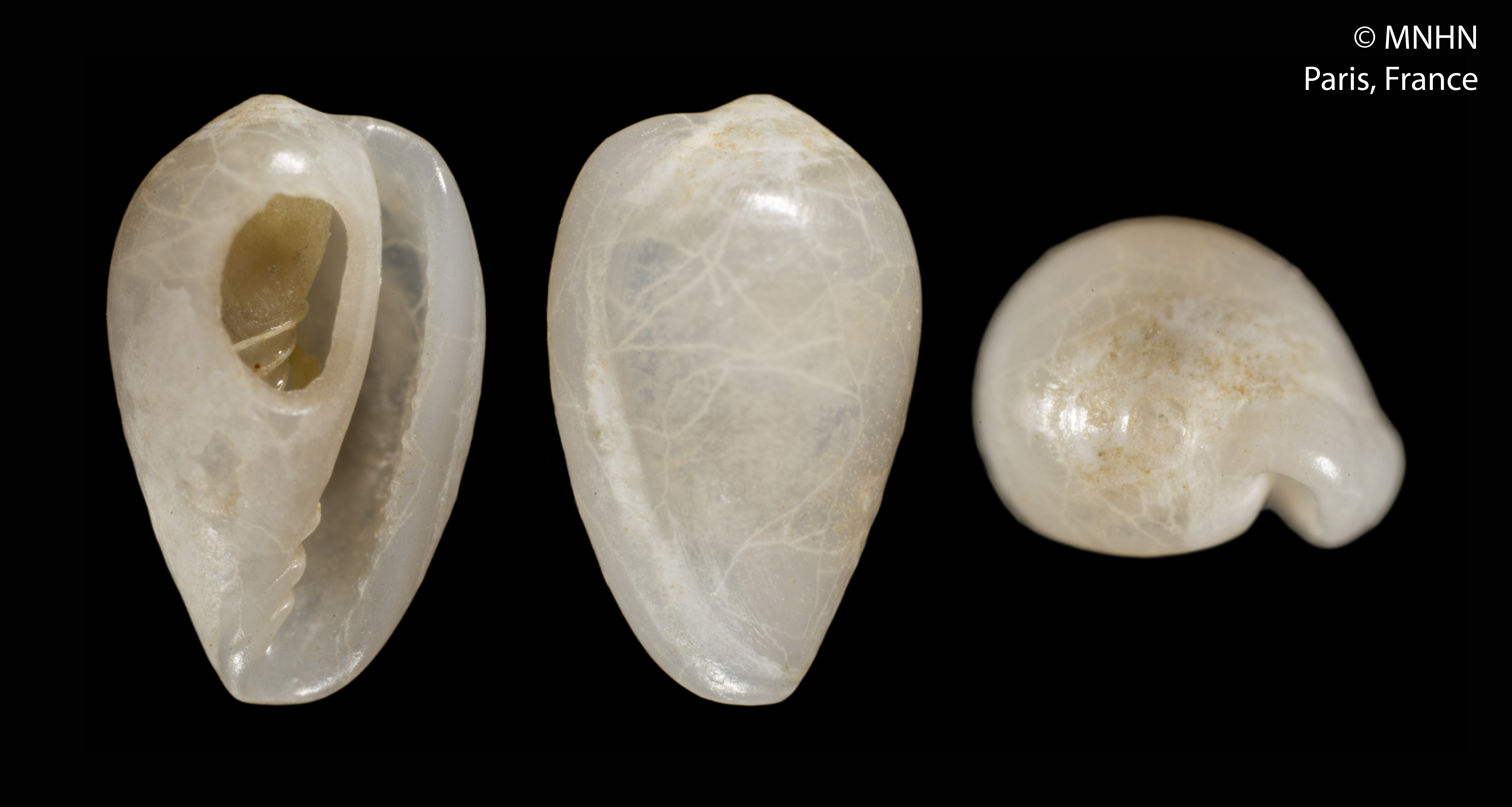
- Shell of Serrata granum (holotype at MNHN, Paris)

Scientific classification
- Kingdom: Animalia
- Phylum: Mollusca
- Class: Gastropoda
- Subclass: Caenogastropoda
- Order: Neogastropoda
- Family: Marginellidae
- Genus: Serrata
- Species: S. granum

Binomial name
- Serrata granum Boyer, 2008

= Serrata granum =

Species of gastropod

Serrata granum is a species of sea snail, a marine gastropod mollusc in the family Marginellidae, the margin snails.

== Description ==
The size of the shell attains 4 mm.

== Distribution ==
This marine species occurs off New Caledonia (depth range 381-469 m).
