= Serrata raiatea =

Scientific classification
- Kingdom: Animalia
- Phylum: Mollusca
- Class: Gastropoda
- Subclass: Caenogastropoda
- Order: Neogastropoda
- Family: Marginellidae
- Genus: Serrata
- Species: S. raiatea

Binomial name
- Serrata raiatea Wakefield, Boyer & McCleery, 2002

Species of gastropod

Serrata raiatea is a species of sea snail, a marine gastropod mollusc in the family Marginellidae, the margin snails.
