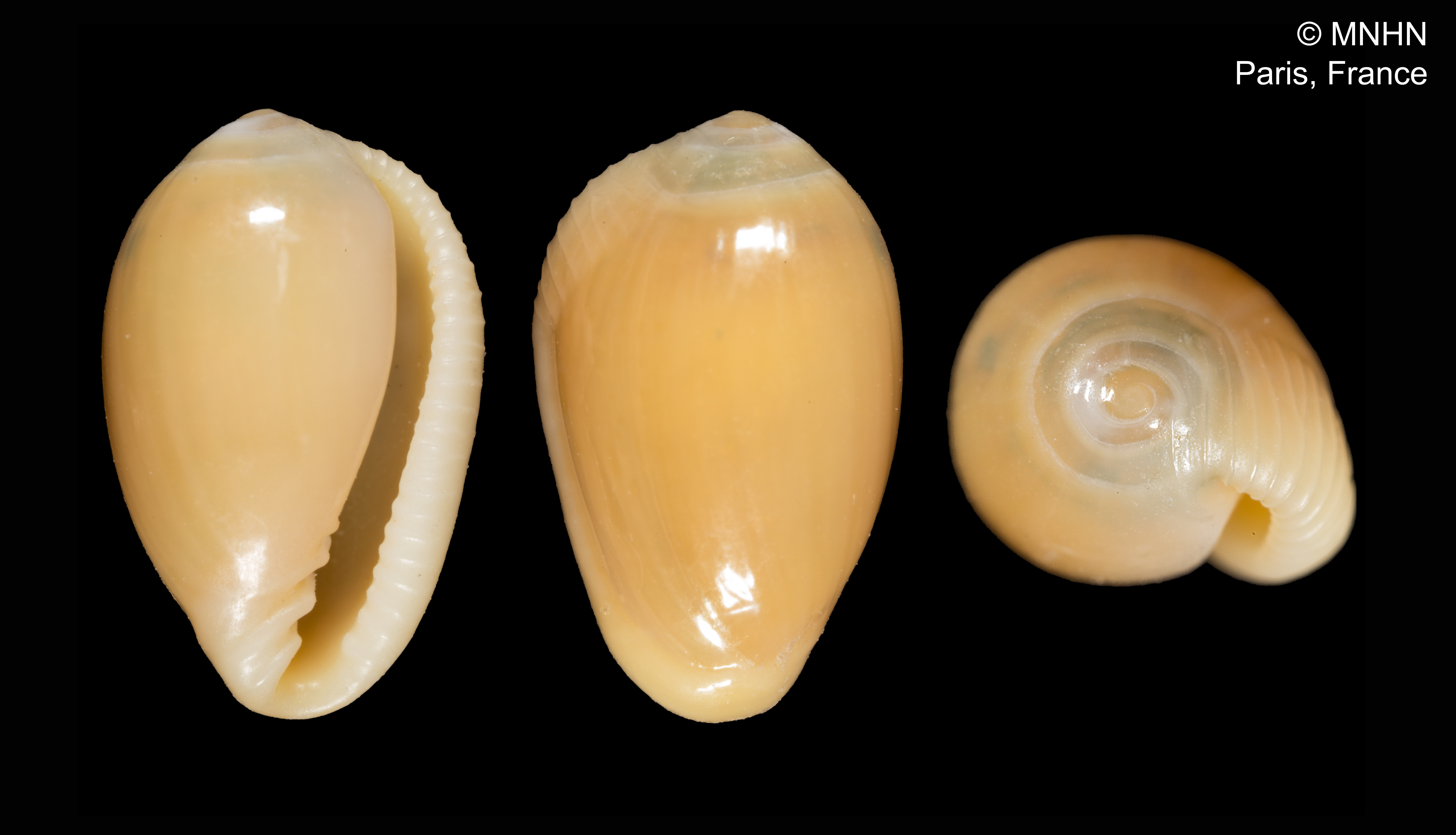
- Shell of Serrata boussoufae (holotype at MNHN, Paris)

Scientific classification
- Kingdom: Animalia
- Phylum: Mollusca
- Class: Gastropoda
- Subclass: Caenogastropoda
- Order: Neogastropoda
- Family: Marginellidae
- Genus: Serrata
- Species: S. boussoufae

Binomial name
- Serrata boussoufae Bozzetti & Briano, 2008

Synonyms
- Serrataginella boussoufae Bozzetti & Briano, 2008

= Serrata boussoufae =

Species of gastropod

Serrata boussoufae is a species of sea snail, a marine gastropod mollusc in the family Marginellidae, the margin snails.

== Description ==
The length of the shell attains 7.5 mm.

The Serrata boussoufae has a trophic level of a predator. The shell is made of calcium carbonate.

== Distribution ==
This marine species occurs off Madagascar.
