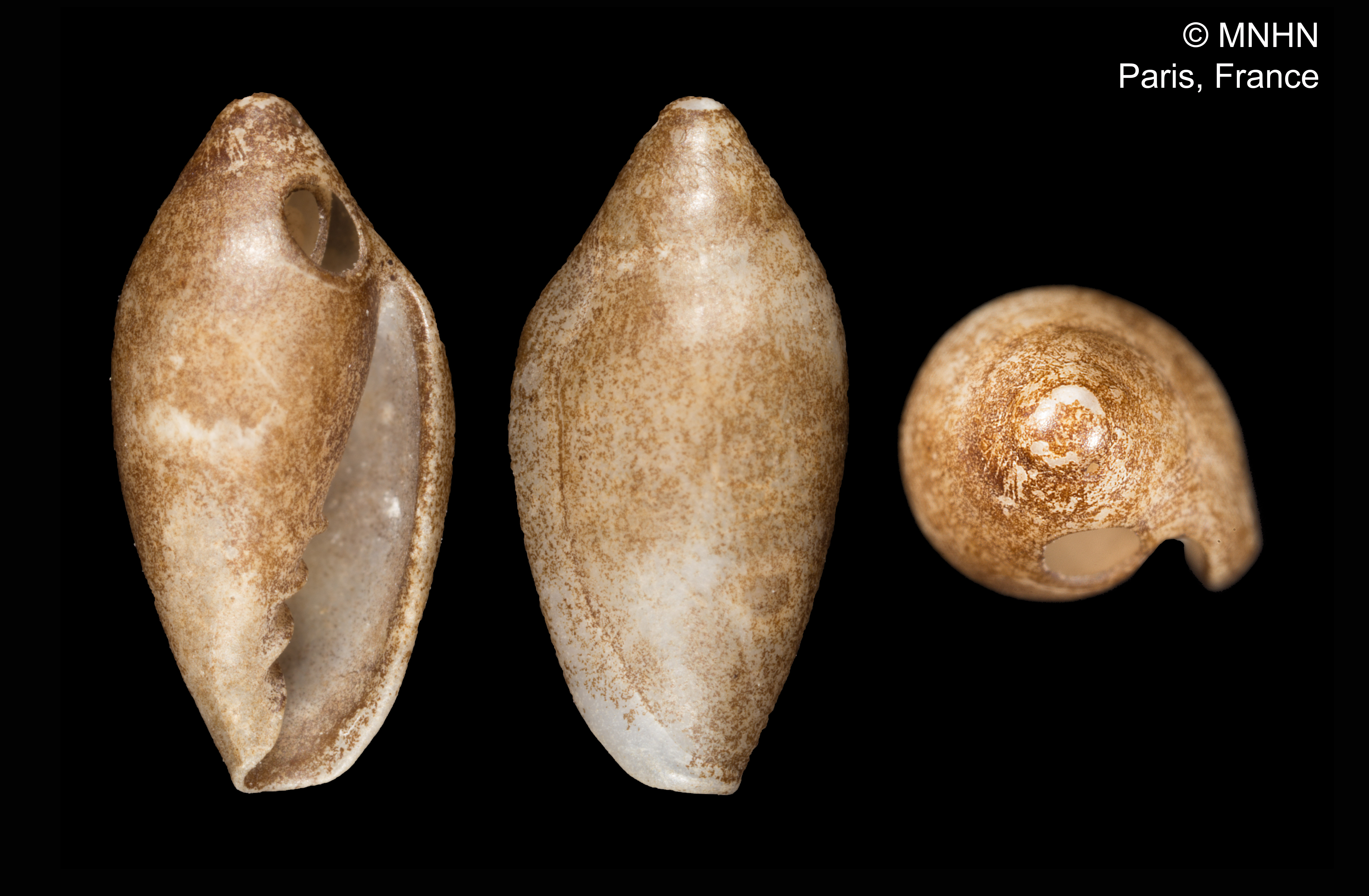
- Shell of Serrata carinata (holotype at MNHN, Paris)

Scientific classification
- Kingdom: Animalia
- Phylum: Mollusca
- Class: Gastropoda
- Subclass: Caenogastropoda
- Order: Neogastropoda
- Family: Marginellidae
- Genus: Serrata
- Species: S. carinata

Binomial name
- Serrata carinata Boyer, 2008

= Serrata carinata =

Species of gastropod

Serrata carinata is a species of sea snail, a marine gastropod mollusc in the family Marginellidae, the margin snails.

== Description ==
A brownish stained thin and opaque marine shell ovate fusiform. The length of the shell attains 6.65 x 3.20 mm, and was found about 635-680 m in Norfolk Ridge, south of New Caledonia. Originally discovered by F. Boyer presumably in 2008.

== Distribution ==
This marine species occurs off New Caledonia (depth range 635-680 m).
