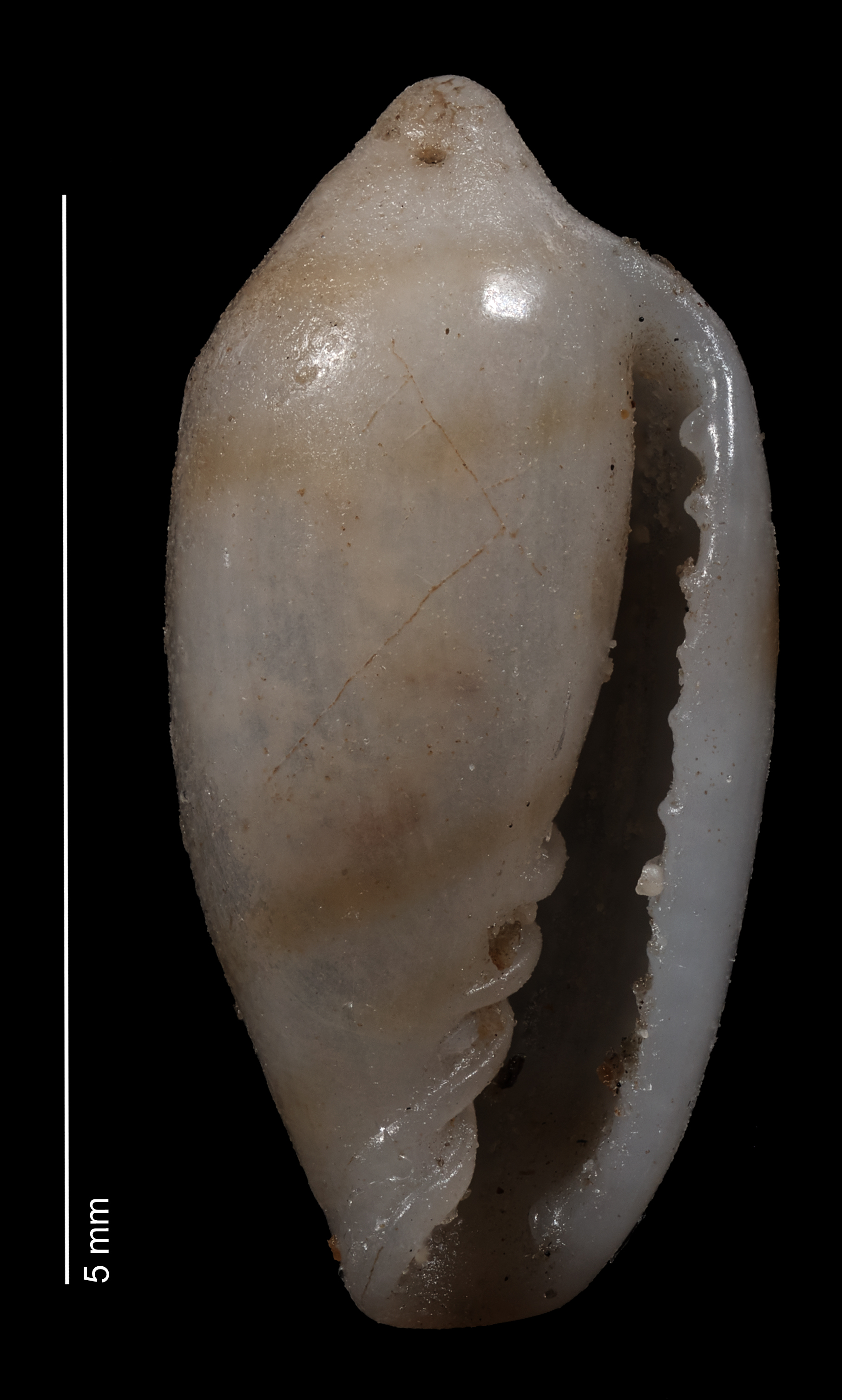
- Shell of Serrata cittadinii (holotype at MNHN, Paris)

Scientific classification
- Kingdom: Animalia
- Phylum: Mollusca
- Class: Gastropoda
- Subclass: Caenogastropoda
- Order: Neogastropoda
- Superfamily: Volutoidea
- Family: Marginellidae
- Subfamily: Austroginellinae
- Genus: Serrata; Jousseaume, 1875

Type species
- Serrata serrata Gaskoin, J.S., 1849

Synonyms
- † Exiginella Laseron, 1957; Deviginella Laseron, 1957; Haloginella Laseron, 1957; Marginella (Haloginella) Laseron, 1957; Serrataginella G.A. Coovert & H.K. Coovert, 1995

= Serrata (gastropod) =

Genus of gastropods

Serrata is a genus of sea snails, marine gastropod molluscs in the subfamily Austroginellinae of the family Marginellidae, the margin snails.

== Species ==
Species within the genus Serrata include:

- Serrata amphora Boyer, 2008
- Serrata arcuata Boyer, 2008
- Serrata aureosa Boyer, 2008
- Serrata bathusi Boyer, 2008
- Serrata beatrix (Cossignani, 2001)
- Serrata boucheti (Boyer, 2001)
- Serrata boussoufae (Bozzetti & Briano, 2008)
- Serrata brianoi Bozzetti, 1994
- Serrata carinata Boyer, 2008
- Serrata cittadinii T. Cossignani, 2020
- Serrata coriolis Boyer, 2008
- Serrata cossignanorum Bozzetti, 1997
- Serrata cylindrata Boyer, 2008
- Serrata delessertiana (Récluz, 1841)
- Serrata dentata Boyer, 2008
- Serrata exquisita Boyer, 2008
- Serrata fasciata (Sowerby G.B. II, 1846)
- † Serrata flemingi P. A. Maxwell, 1988
- Serrata fusulina Boyer, 2008
- Serrata gradata Boyer, 2008
- Serrata granum Boyer, 2008
- † Serrata hectori (Kirk, 1882)
- Serrata hians Boyer, 2008
- Serrata inflata Boyer, 2008
- Serrata isabelae (Bozzetti, 2005)
- † Serrata kirki (Marwick, 1924)
- Serrata laevis Boyer, 2008
- Serrata lifouana Boyer, 2008
- Serrata magna Boyer, 2008
- Serrata maoriana (Powell, 1932)
- † Serrata marwicki (Finlay, 1927)
- Serrata meta (Thiele, 1925)
- Serrata microdentata Boyer, 2018
- Serrata minima Boyer, 2008
- Serrata mustelina (Angas, 1871)
- Serrata occidentalis Boyer, 2008
- Serrata orientalis Boyer, 2008
- Serrata osteri Jousseaume, 1875
- Serrata ovata Boyer, 2008
- Serrata perlucida Boyer, 2008
- Serrata polynesiae Wakefield & McCleery, 2002
- Serrata procera Boyer, 2008
- † Serrata propinqua (Tate, 1878)
- Serrata pupoides Boyer, 2008
- Serrata quadrifasciata Boyer, 2008
- Serrata raiatea Wakefield & McCleery, 2002
- Serrata raoulica Marshall, 2004
- Serrata robusta Boyer, 2008
- Serrata serrata (Gaskoin, 1849)
- Serrata simplex Boyer, 2008
- Serrata sinuosa Boyer, 2008
- Serrata spryi (Clover, 1974)
- Serrata stylaster (Boyer, 2001)
- Serrata summa Boyer, 2008
- Serrata tahanea Wakefield & McCleery, 2002
- Serrata tenuis Boyer, 2008
- Serrata translata Redfield, 1870
- Serrata tuii (Cossignani, 2001)
- Serrata veneria Boyer, 2008
- † Serrata winteri (Tate, 1878)

Species brought into synonymy

- Serrata albescens (Hutton, 1873): synonym of Volvarina albescens (Hutton, 1873)
- Serrata caledonica Jousseaume, 1877: synonym of Hydroginella caledonica (Jousseaume, 1877)
- Serrata columnaria (Hedley & May, 1908): synonym of Hydroginella columnaria (Hedley & May, 1908)
- Serrata delessertiana (Récluz, 1841): synonym of Hydroginella delessertiana (Récluz, 1841)
- Serrata dispersa Laseron, 1957: synonym of Hydroginella dispersa (Laseron, 1957)
- Serrata fascicula (Laseron, 1957): synonym of Hydroginella fascicula (Laseron, 1957)
- Serrata guttula (G.B. Sowerby I, 1832): synonym of Hydroginella guttula (G. B. Sowerby I, 1832)
- Serrata lienardi Jousseaume, 1875: synonym of Hydroginella sordida (Reeve, 1865)
- Serrata mixta (Petterd, 1884): synonym of Hydroginella mixta (Petterd, 1884)
- Serrata osteri Jousseaume, 1875: synonym of Hydroginella osteri (Jousseaume, 1875) (original combination)
- Serrata parvistriata (Suter, 1908): synonym of Volvarina parvistriata (Suter, 1908)
- Serrata plicatula (Suter, 1909): synonym of Volvarina plicatula (Suter, 1909)
- Serrata pyriformis Pease, 1868: synonym of Serrata translata Redfield, 1870
- Serrata sagamiensis (Kuroda, Habe & Oyama, 1971): synonym of Hyalina sagamiensis Kuroda, Habe & Oyama, 1971
- Serrata scintilla Jousseaume, 1875: synonym of Hydroginella scintilla (Jousseaume, 1875) (original combination)
- Serrata sordida (Reeve, 1865): synonym of Serrata delessertiana (Récluz, 1841)
- Serrata tridentata (Tate, 1878): synonym of Hydroginella tridentata (Tate, 1878)
- Serrata triplicata Gaskoin, 1849: synonym of Granulina guttula (G. B. Sowerby I, 1832): synonym of Hydroginella guttula (G. B. Sowerby I, 1832)
