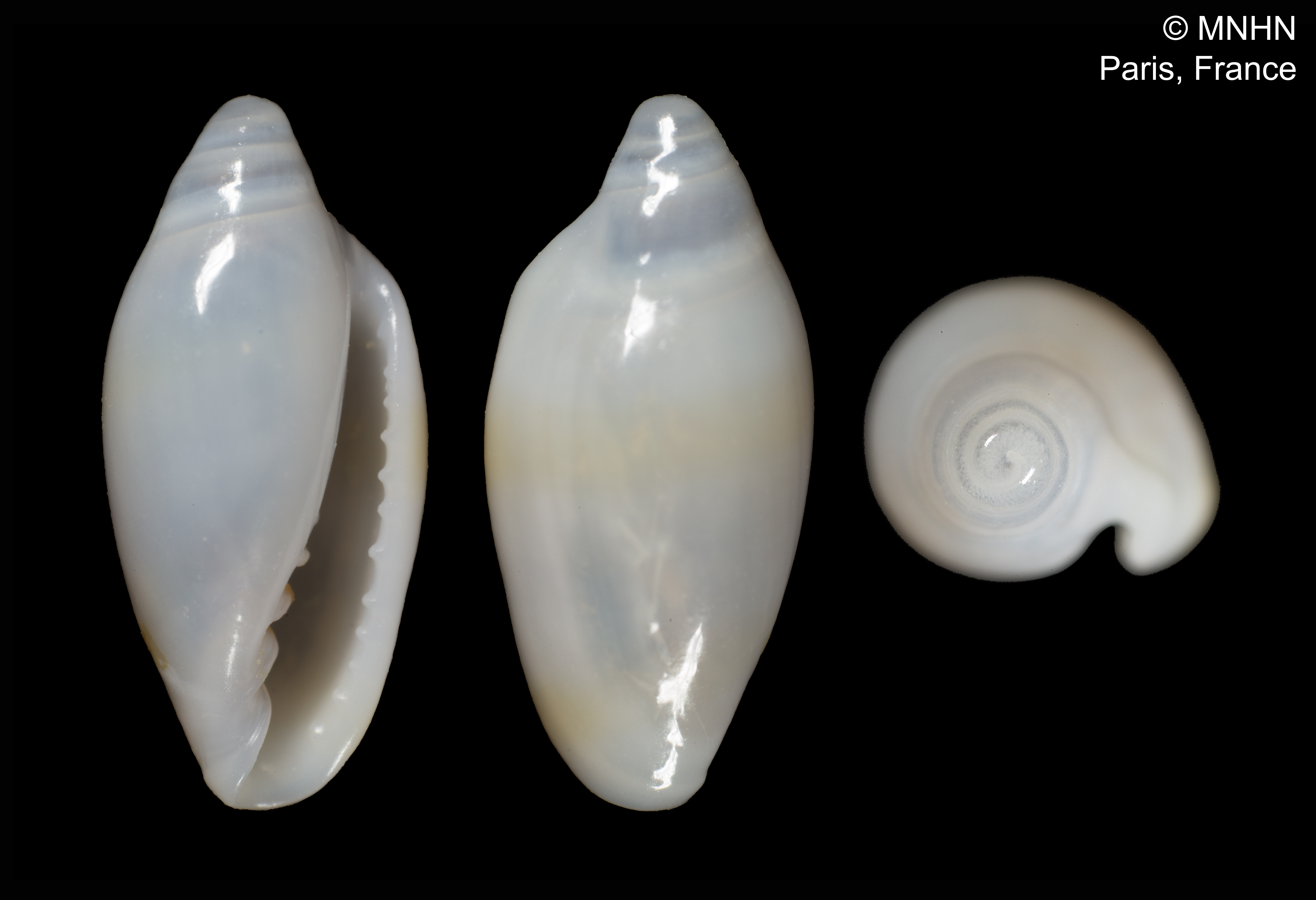
- Shell of Serrata dentata (holotype at MNHN, Paris)

Scientific classification
- Kingdom: Animalia
- Phylum: Mollusca
- Class: Gastropoda
- Subclass: Caenogastropoda
- Order: Neogastropoda
- Family: Marginellidae
- Genus: Serrata
- Species: S. dentata

Binomial name
- Serrata dentata Boyer, 2008

= Serrata dentata =

Species of gastropod

Serrata dentata is a species of sea snail, a marine gastropod mollusc in the family Marginellidae, the margin snails.

== Description ==
The shell is slender, solid, and semi-translucent. There are five narrow plaits, 2 anterior ones that are nearly straight, second one being very long. The 3 upper ones are less oblique, decreasing in size posteriorly. On it, the fifth plait is not fully formed. Its ground color is whitish, with 2 pale narrow orange bands on dorsum, both more marked on outer margin than elsewhere and decreasing in intensity over last whorl. Its dimensions are 6.90 x 3.15 mm.

== Distribution ==
This marine species occurs off New Caledonia (d range 444-445 m).
