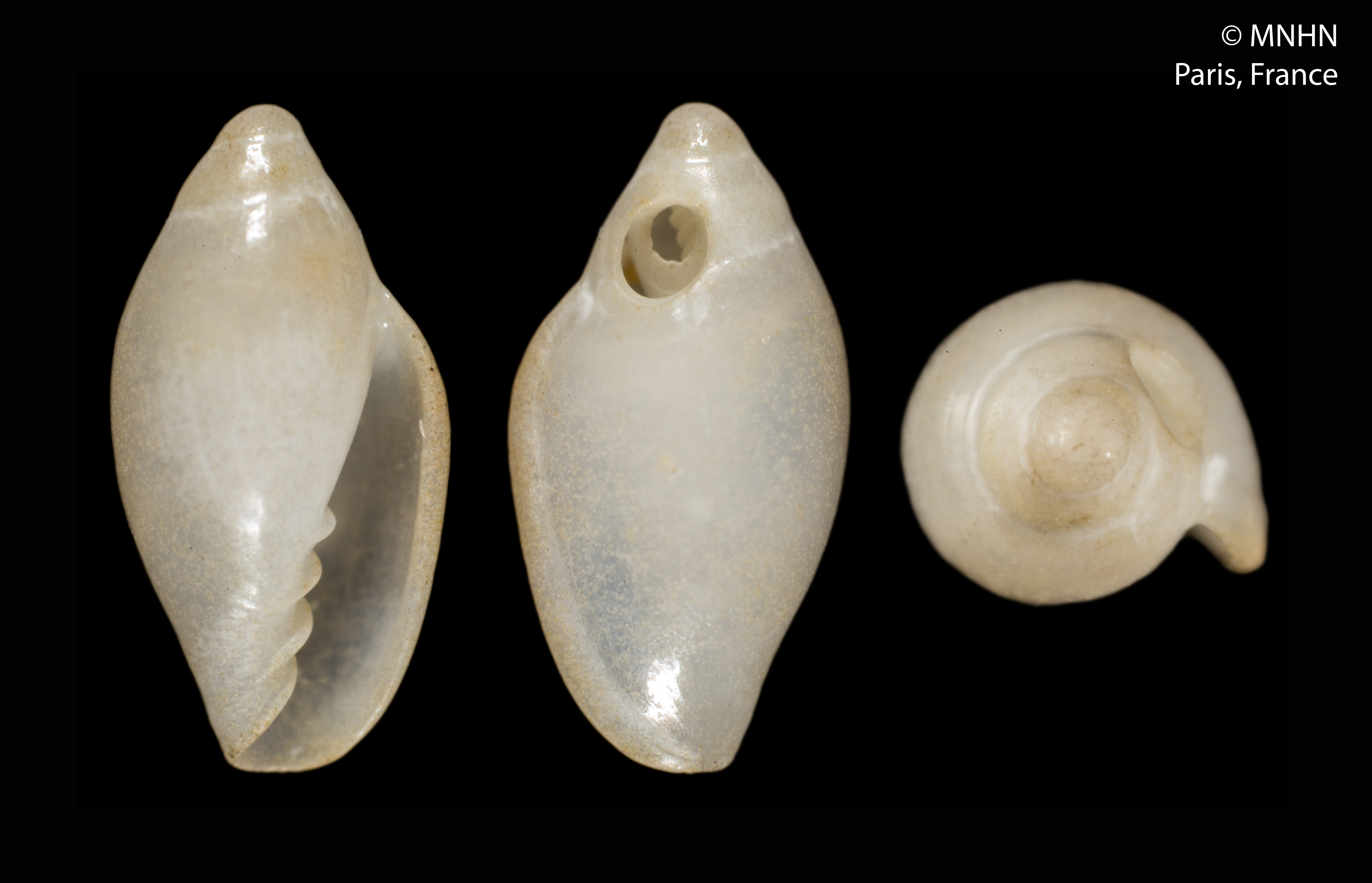
- Shell of Serrata simplex (holotype at MNHN, Paris)

Scientific classification
- Kingdom: Animalia
- Phylum: Mollusca
- Class: Gastropoda
- Subclass: Caenogastropoda
- Order: Neogastropoda
- Family: Marginellidae
- Genus: Serrata
- Species: S. simplex

Binomial name
- Serrata simplex Boyer, 2008

= Serrata simplex =

Species of gastropod

Serrata simplex is a species of sea snail, a marine gastropod mollusc in the family Marginellidae, the margin snails.

== Description ==
The length of the shell attains 4.3 mm.

== Distribution ==
This marine species occurs off New Caledonia (depth range 397-400 m.).
