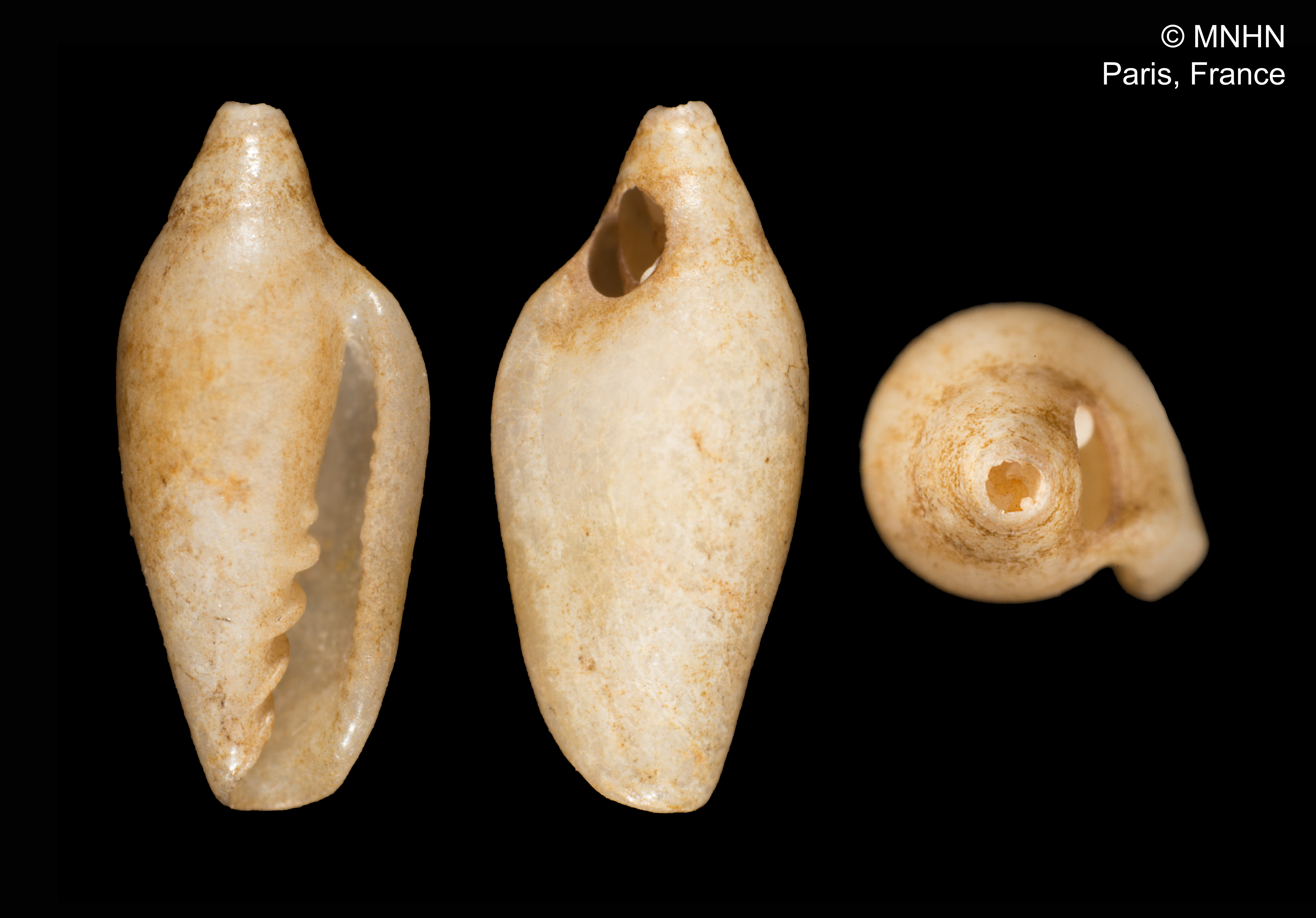
- Shell of Serrata coriolis (holotype at MNHN, Paris)

Scientific classification
- Kingdom: Animalia
- Phylum: Mollusca
- Class: Gastropoda
- Subclass: Caenogastropoda
- Order: Neogastropoda
- Family: Marginellidae
- Genus: Serrata
- Species: S. coriolis

Binomial name
- Serrata coriolis Boyer, 2008

= Serrata coriolis =

Species of gastropod

Serrata coriolis is a species of sea snail, a marine gastropod mollusc in the family Marginellidae, the margin snails.

== Description ==
The length of the shell attains 5 mm.

== Distribution ==
This marine species occurs off New Caledonia (depth range 470–480 m.).
