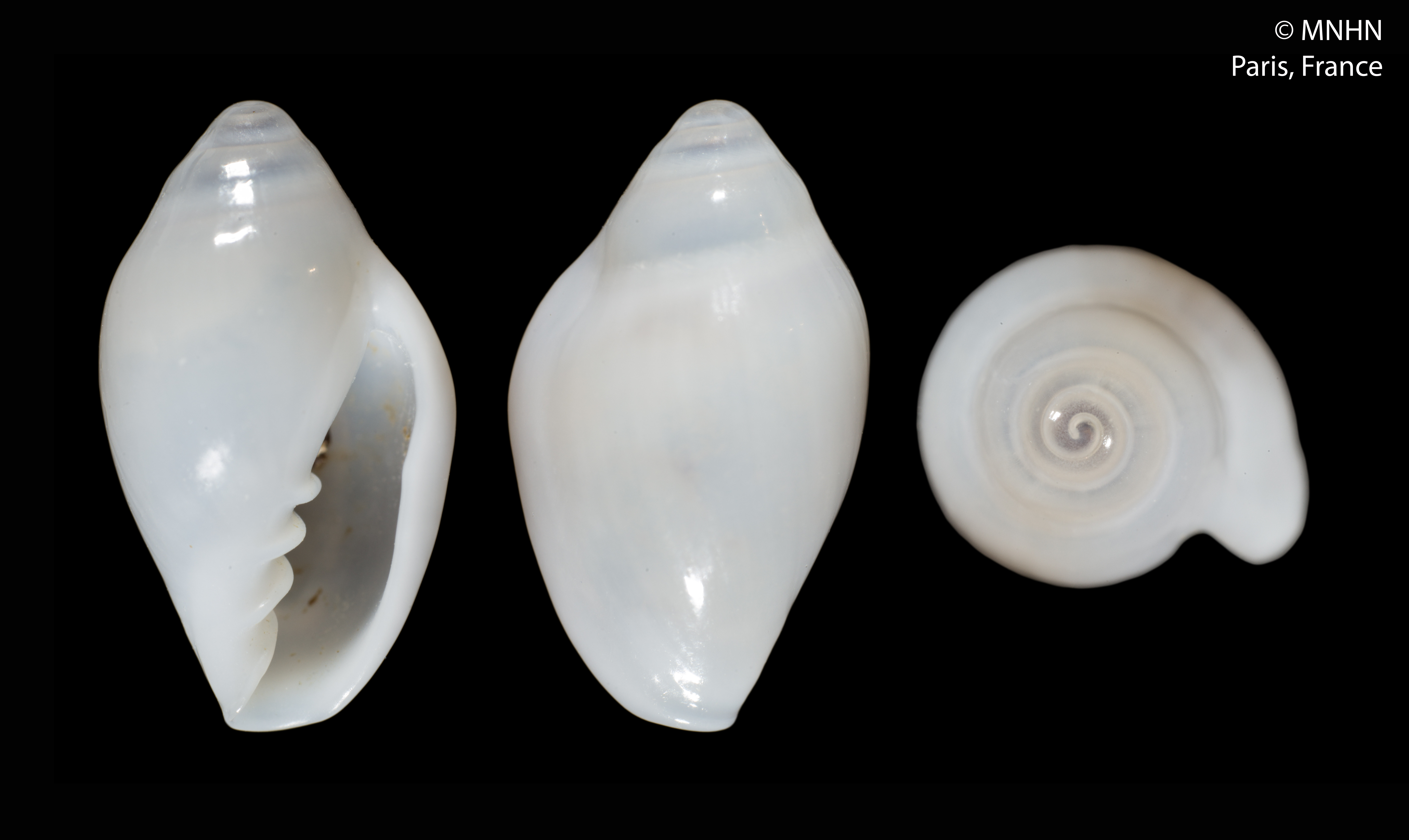
- Shell of Serrata magna (holotype at MNHN, Paris)

Scientific classification
- Kingdom: Animalia
- Phylum: Mollusca
- Class: Gastropoda
- Subclass: Caenogastropoda
- Order: Neogastropoda
- Family: Marginellidae
- Genus: Serrata
- Species: S. magna

Binomial name
- Serrata magna Boyer, 2008

= Serrata magna =

Species of gastropod

Serrata magna is a species of sea snail, a marine gastropod mollusc in the family Marginellidae, the margin snails.

== Description ==
The length of the shell attains 9.7 mm.

== Distribution ==
This marine species occurs off New Caledonia (depth range 700-965 m).
