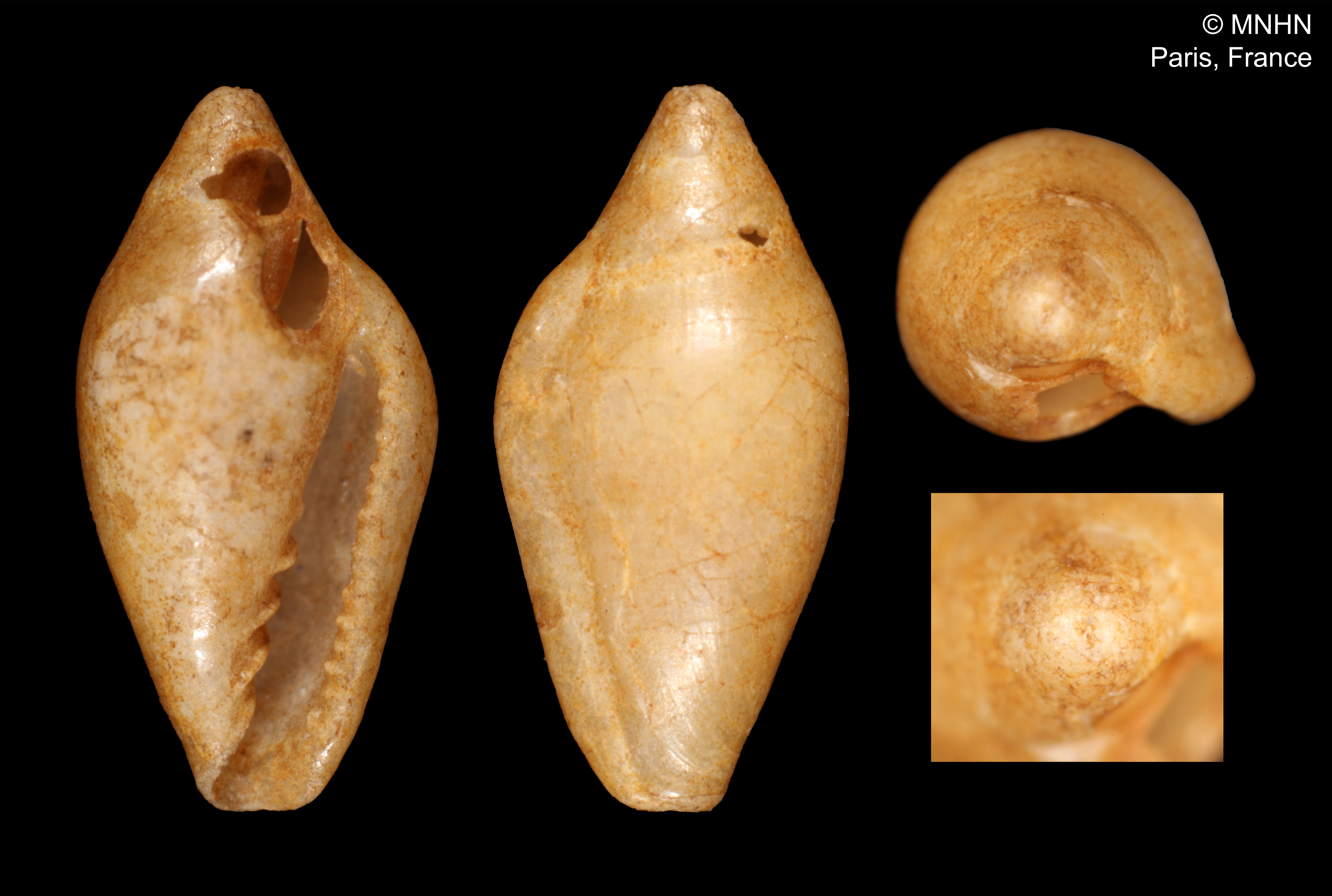
- Shell of Serrata lifouana (holotype at MNHN? Paris)

Scientific classification
- Kingdom: Animalia
- Phylum: Mollusca
- Class: Gastropoda
- Subclass: Caenogastropoda
- Order: Neogastropoda
- Family: Marginellidae
- Genus: Serrata
- Species: S. lifouana

Binomial name
- Serrata lifouana Boyer, 2008

= Serrata lifouana =

Species of gastropod

Serrata lifouana is a species of sea snail, a marine gastropod mollusc in the family Marginellidae, the margin snails.

== Description ==
The length of the shell attains 4.25 mm.

== Distribution ==
This marine species occurs off New Caledonia at depths between 340 and 470 m.
