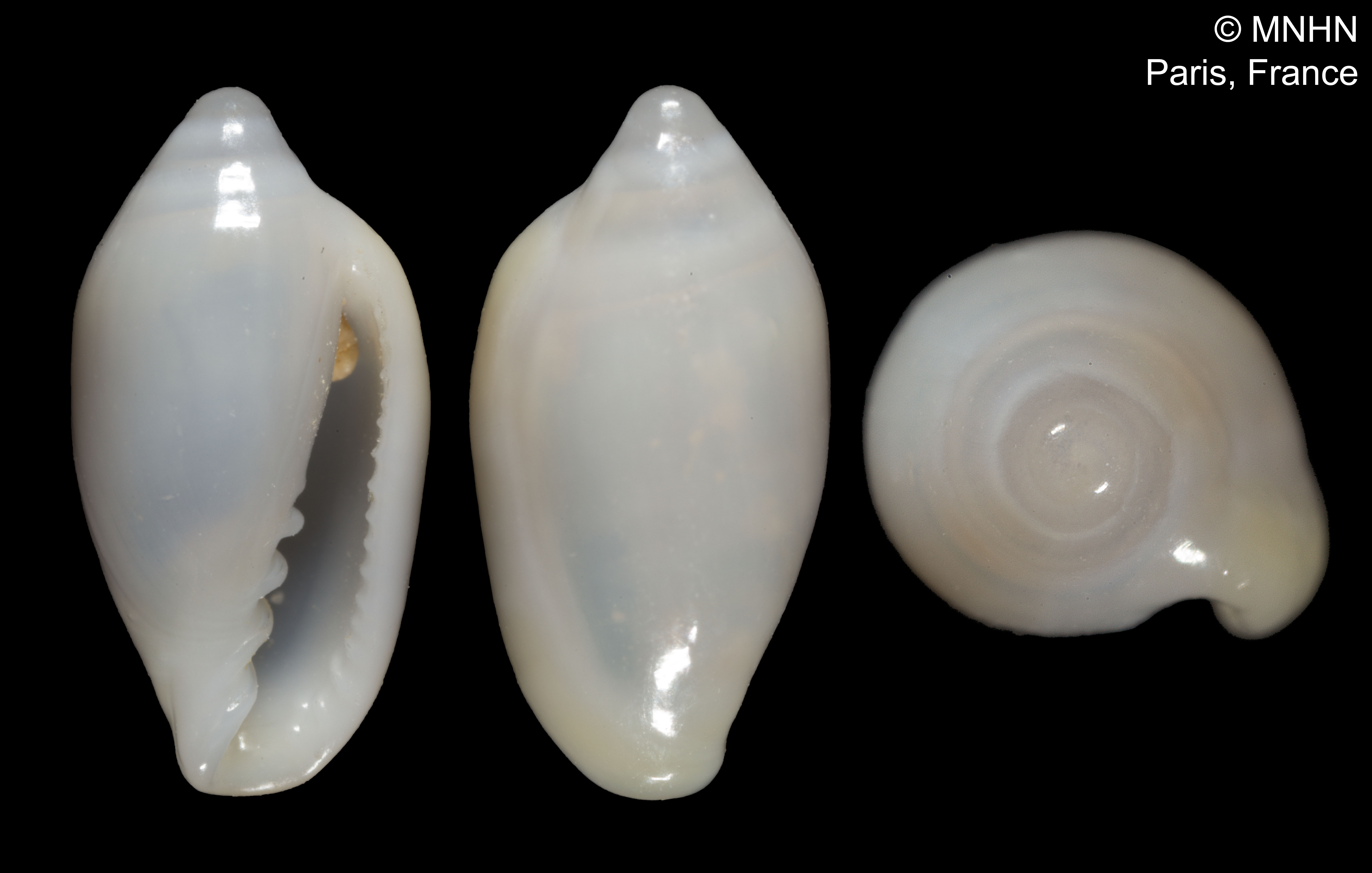
- Shell of Serrata aureosa (holotype at MNHN, Paris)

Scientific classification
- Kingdom: Animalia
- Phylum: Mollusca
- Class: Gastropoda
- Subclass: Caenogastropoda
- Order: Neogastropoda
- Family: Marginellidae
- Genus: Serrata
- Species: S. aureosa

Binomial name
- Serrata aureosa Boyer, 2008

= Serrata aureosa =

Species of gastropod

Serrata aureosa is a species of sea snail, a marine gastropod mollusc in the family Marginellidae, the margin snails.

== Description ==
The length of the shell attains 6.05 mm.

== Distribution ==
This marine species occurs off New Caledonia (depth range 525-547 m.).
