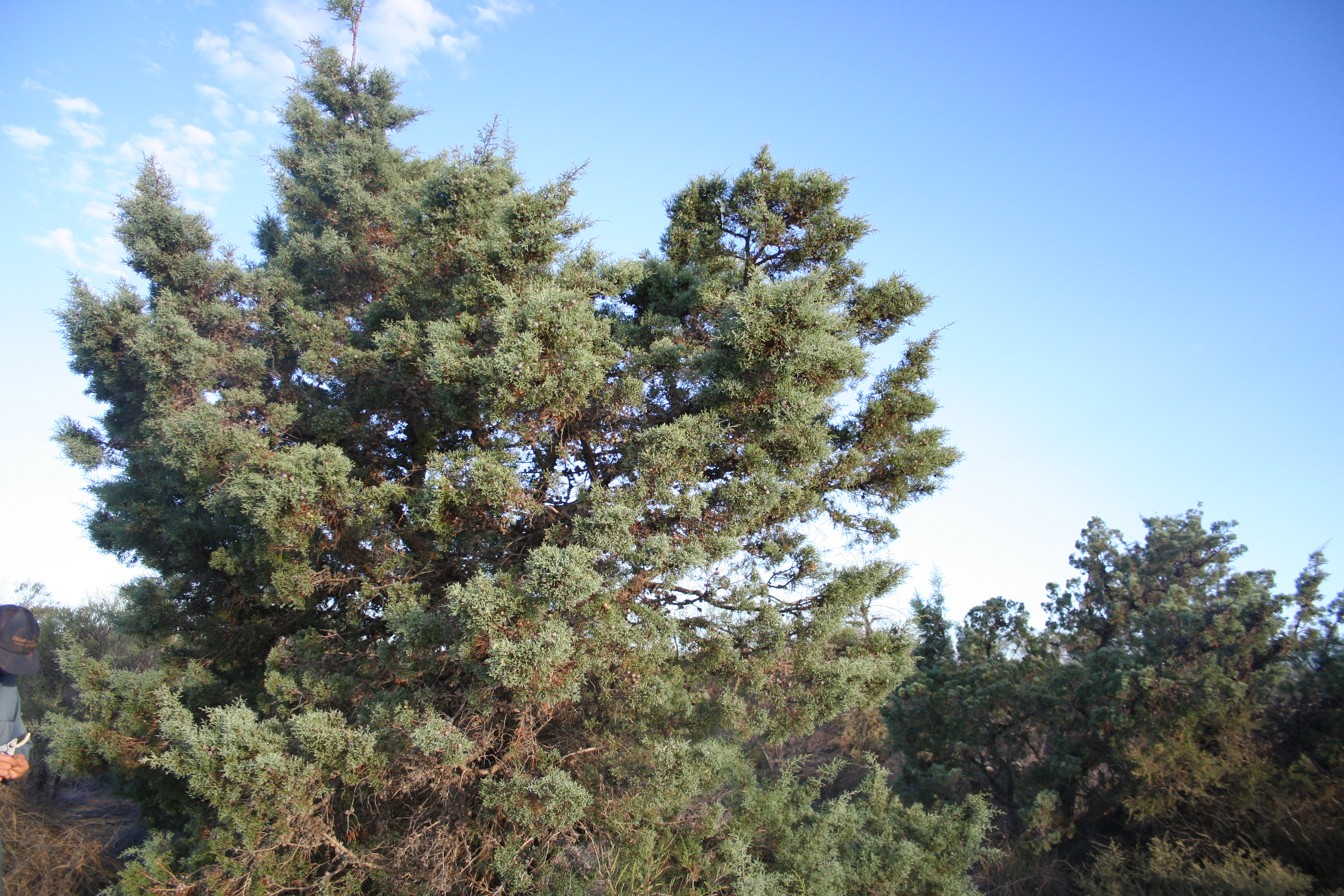

Conservation status
- Least Concern (IUCN 3.1)

Scientific classification
- Kingdom: Plantae
- Clade: Tracheophytes
- Clade: Gymnosperms
- Division: Pinophyta
- Class: Pinopsida
- Order: Cupressales
- Family: Cupressaceae
- Genus: Callitris
- Species: C. arenaria

Binomial name
- Callitris arenaria (C.A.Gardner) J.E.Piggin & J.J.Bruhl

Synonyms
- Actinostrobus arenarius C.A.Gardner; Actinostrobus pyramidalis var. arenarius (C.A.Gardner) Silba; Actinostrobus pyramidalis subsp. arenarius (C.A.Gardner) Silba

= Callitris arenaria =

Species of conifer

Callitris arenaria (synonym Actinostrobus arenarius) is a species of conifer in the cypress family, Cupressaceae. Its common names include sandplain cypress, Bruce cypress, Bruce cypress-pine, and tamin. It is endemic to Western Australia.

This species is a shrub or a tree growing up to 5 metres (16 ft) tall. It has spreading branches with small branchlets. The scale-like, gray-green leaves are up to 1.2 centimetres (0.47 in) long and grow in threes. The cylindrical male cones are up to half a centimeter long. The female cones are up to 2 cm (0.79 in) long with pointed scales. They contain winged seeds.

Western Australian State Botanist Charles Gardner described the species in 1964, from a specimen collected at Tammin, Western Australia. The species name is derived from the Latin word arena "sand", relating to where the sandplain cypress grows. A 2010 study of the genera Actinostrobus and Callitris found that all three species of Actinostrobus lay within the current concept of Callitris based on analysis of 42 morphological and anatomical characters, hence Actinostrobus arenarius was renamed Callitris arenaria.

This plant grows in colonies on sandplains, as part of a low scrubby plant community known as kwongan; associated plant species include proteaceae of the genus Banksia, Conospermum, Grevillea and Hakea, myrtaceae of the genus Melaleuca, various Acacia species and the conifers Callitris preissii and C. roei. Some of its habitat has been degraded or destroyed, but the plant is still widespread and grows in several protected areas. It is found from Lake Grace north to the Murchison River.

The Bruce cypress colonises disturbed areas, forming stands on road verges and areas cleared for agriculture.
