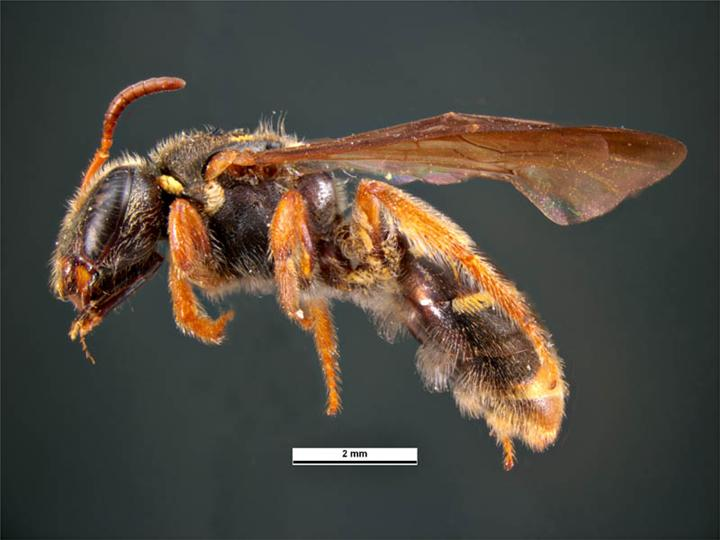
- Female
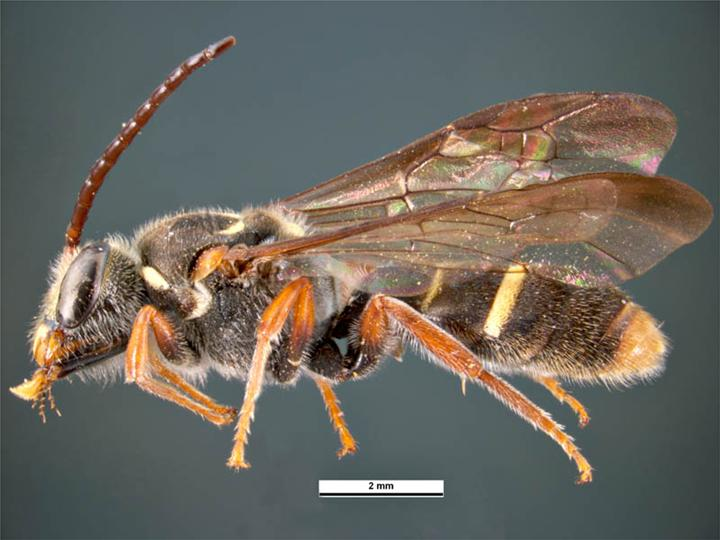
- Male

Scientific classification
- Kingdom: Animalia
- Phylum: Arthropoda
- Clade: Pancrustacea
- Class: Insecta
- Order: Hymenoptera
- Family: Halictidae
- Genus: Lasioglossum
- Species: L. peraustrale

Binomial name
- Lasioglossum peraustrale (Cockerell, 1904)

Synonyms
- Halictus peraustralis Cockerell, 1904; Halictus odyneroides Rayment, 1939

= Lasioglossum peraustrale =

Species of bee

Lasioglossum peraustrale, or Lasioglossum (Australictus) peraustrale, is a species of bee in the family Halictidae and subfamily Halictinae. It is endemic to Australia. It was described by British-American entomologist Theodore Dru Alison Cockerell in 1904.

== Distribution and habitat ==
The species occurs in eastern mainland Australia. Type localities include White Swamp in north-eastern New South Wales.

== Behaviour ==
The adults are flying mellivores. They nest gregariously in rotten wood and have sedentary larvae. Flowering plants visited by the bees include Angophora, Bursaria, Eucalyptus, Leptospermum and Tristaniopsis species.
