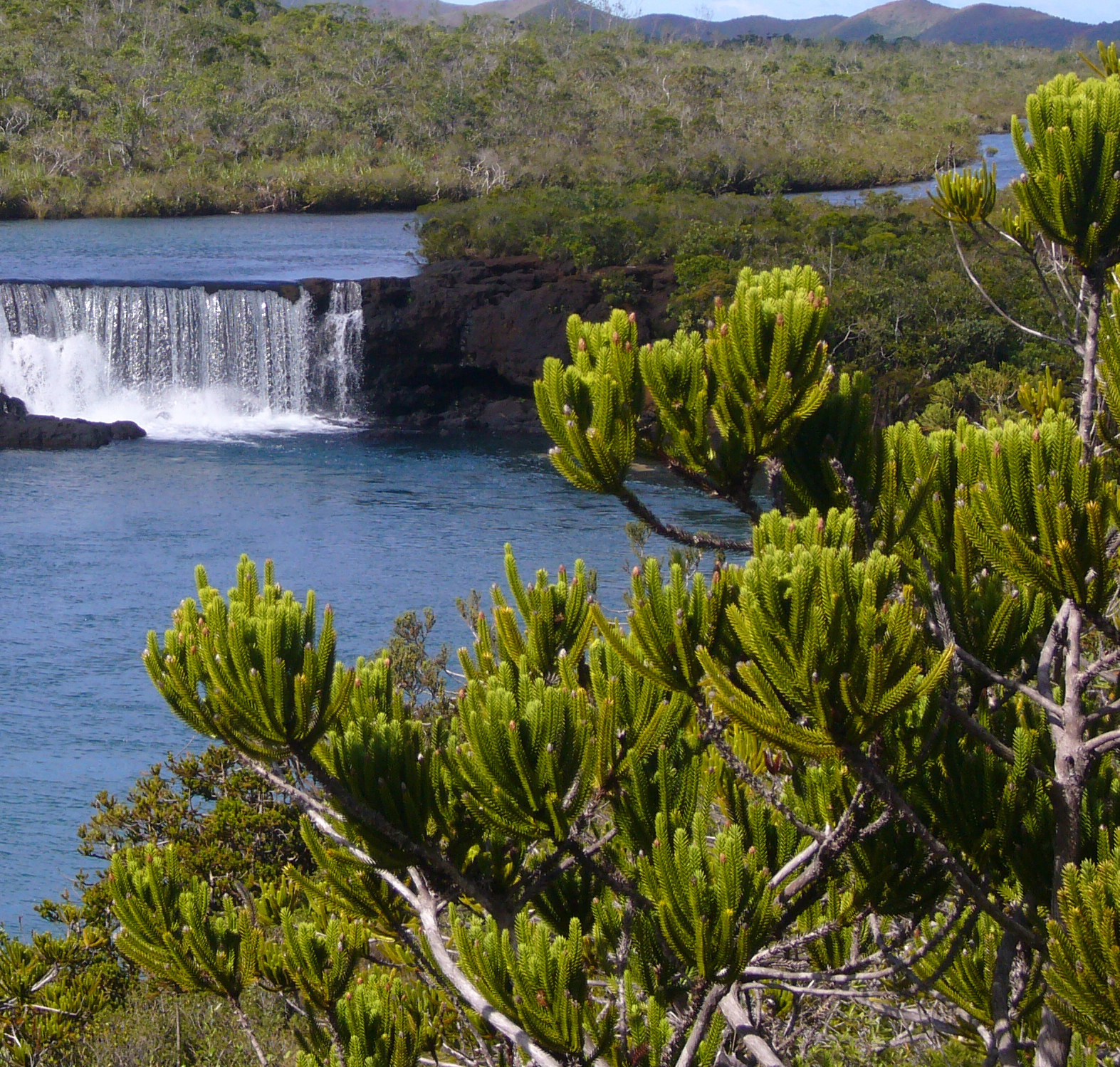
- Specimen at Chutes de la Madeleine, New Caledonia

Conservation status
- Endangered (IUCN 3.1)

Scientific classification
- Kingdom: Plantae
- Clade: Tracheophytes
- Clade: Gymnosperms
- Division: Pinophyta
- Class: Pinopsida
- Order: Cupressales
- Family: Cupressaceae
- Genus: Callitris
- Species: C. pancheri

Binomial name
- Callitris pancheri (Carrière) Byng

Synonyms
- Eutacta pancheri Carrière (basionym); Neocallitropsis pancheri (Carrière) de Laub.

= Callitris pancheri =

Species of conifer

Callitris pancheri is a species of conifer in the cypress family, Cupressaceae. It is endemic to New Caledonia, where it occurs in small, scattered population along rivers. It used to be placed in its own genus Neocallitropsis but molecular phylogenetic analysis indicated that it was nested within Callitris, but only when the New Caledonian species C. sulcata (to which it is most closely related) is included.

It is a coniferous tree growing to 2–10 metres (7–33 ft) tall. The leaves are awl-shaped, 1 centimetre (0.4 in) long, arranged in eight rows in alternating whorls of four; in overall appearance, the foliage is superficially similar to some species of Araucaria, though they are only very distantly related; in Araucaria the leaf arrangement is spiral, not in whorls. Callitris pancheri is dioecious, with separate male and female trees; the seed cones are 1.5–2.0 cm (0.6–0.8 in) long, with eight woody scales arranged in two whorls of four.

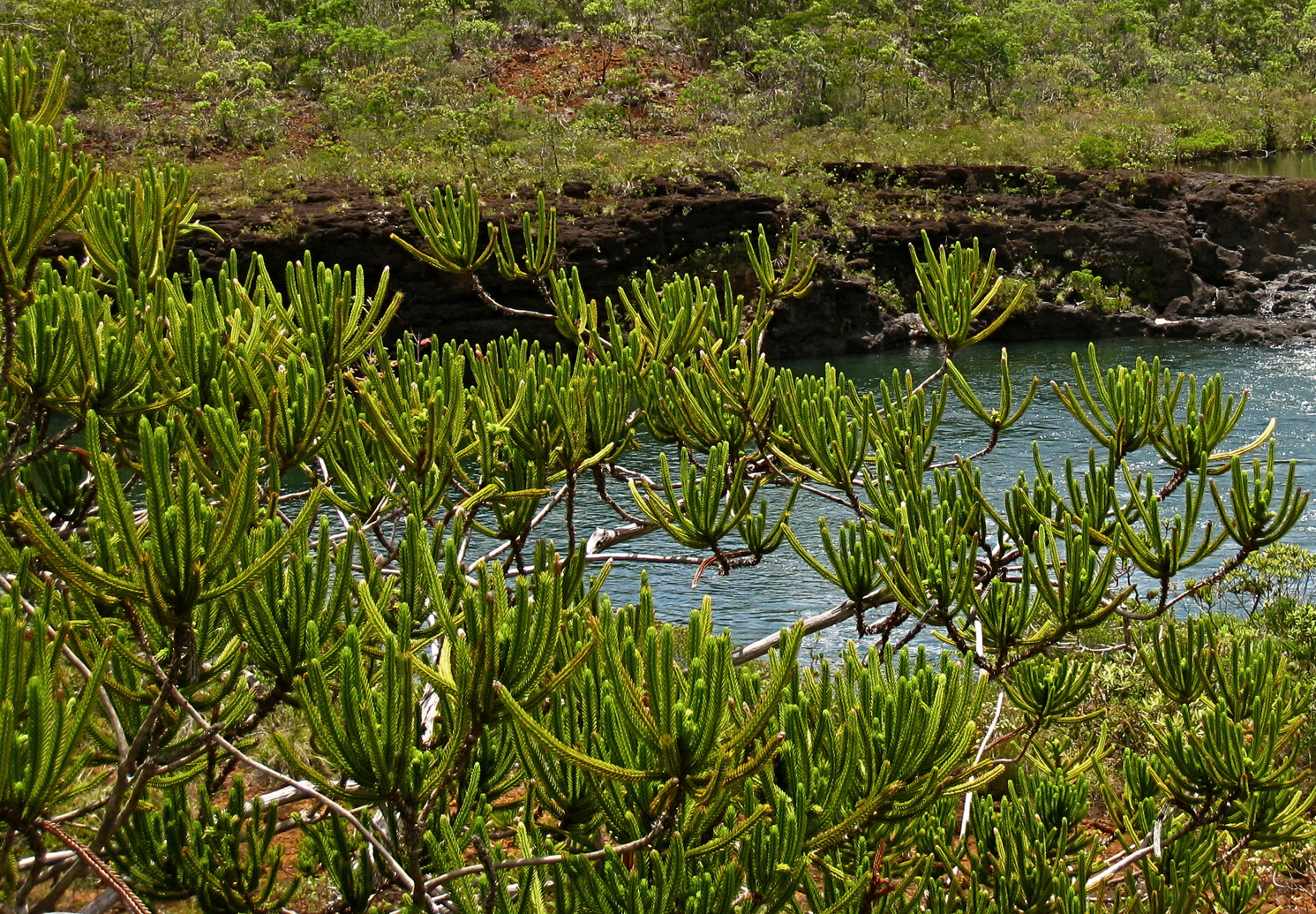
Callitris pancheri at Chutes de la Madeleine, New Caledonia

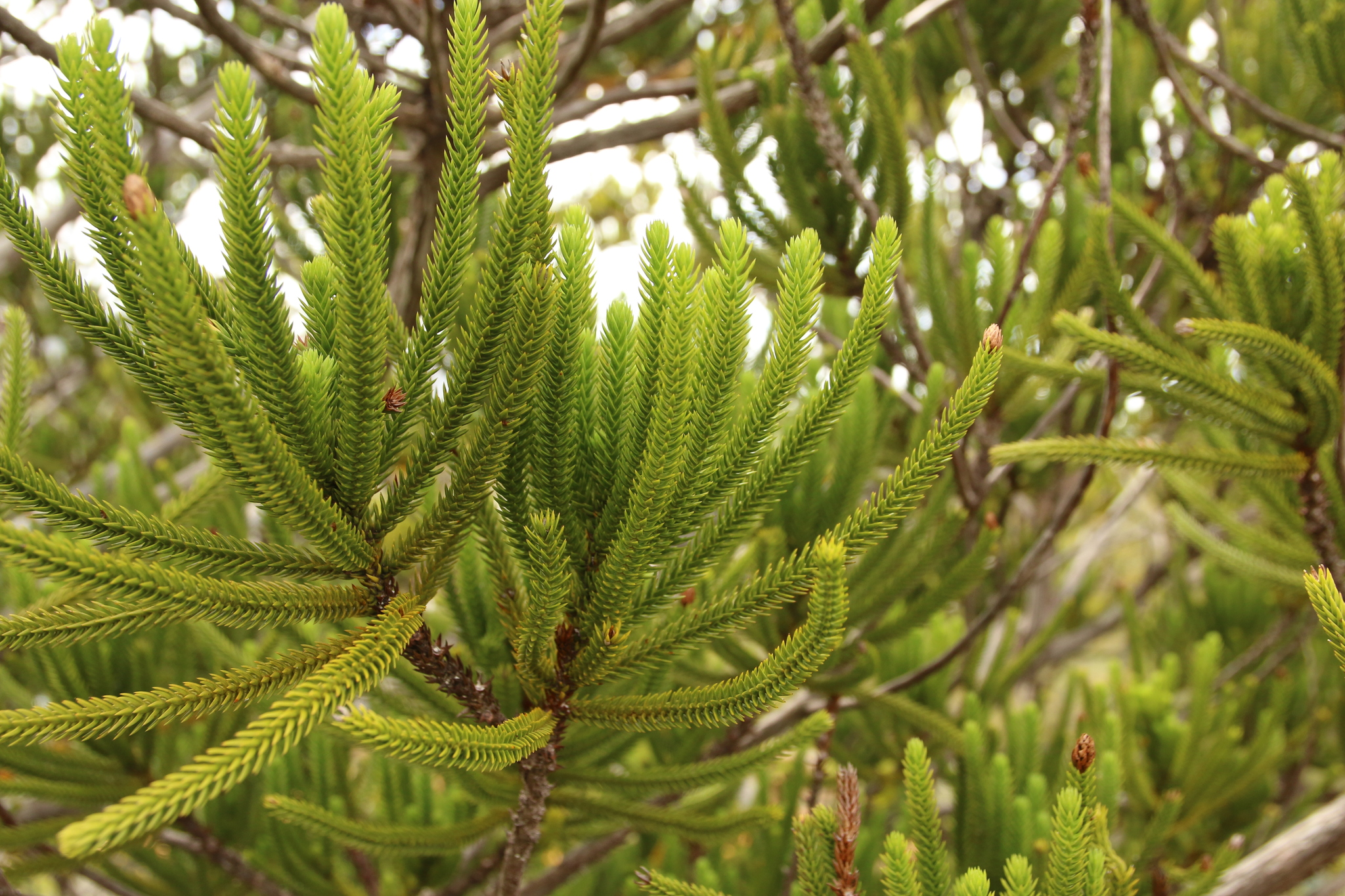
Adult foliage and pollen cones, Chutes de la Madeleine, New Caledonia

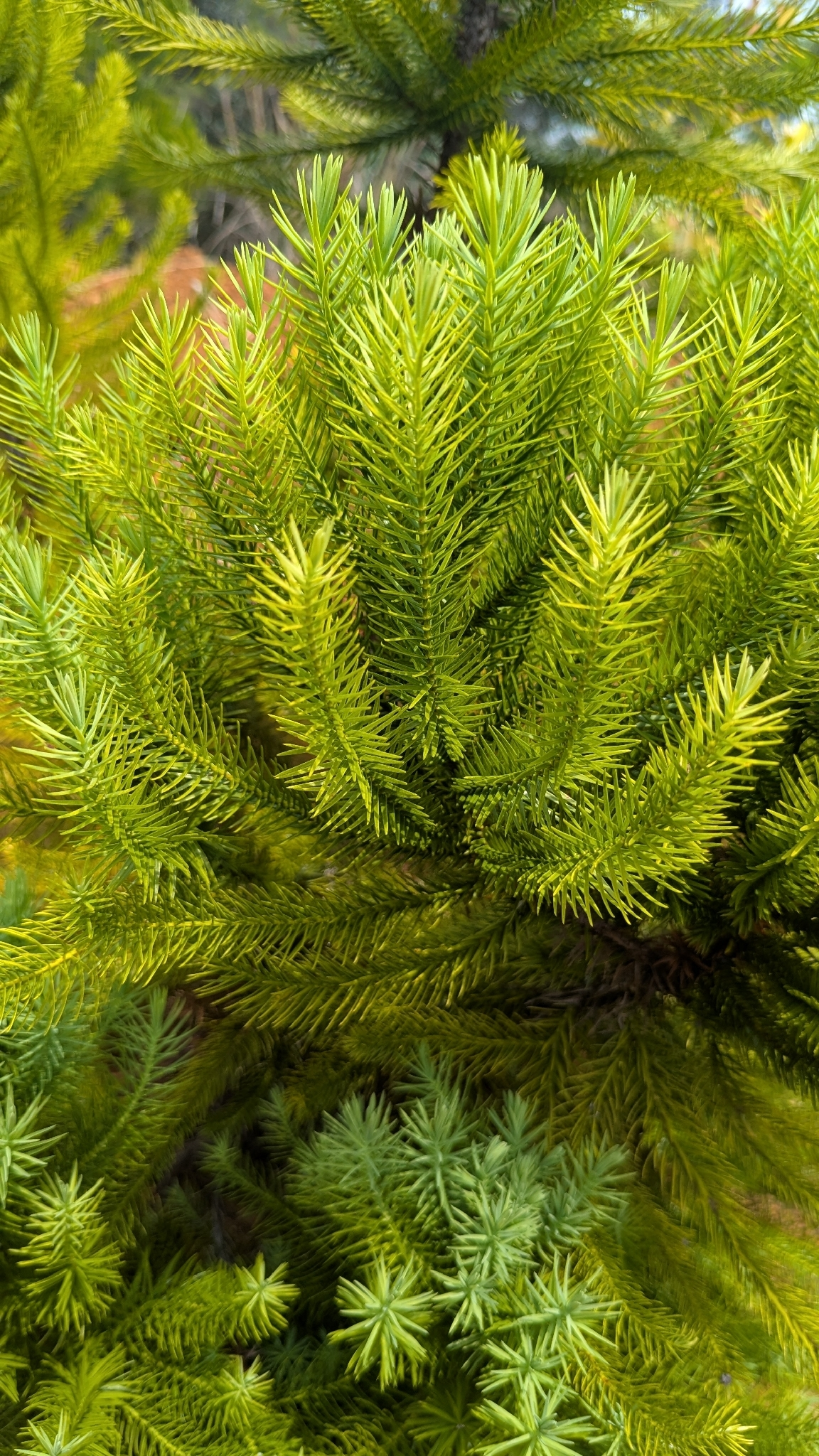
Juvenile foliage, Parc provincial de la Rivière Bleue, New Caledonia
