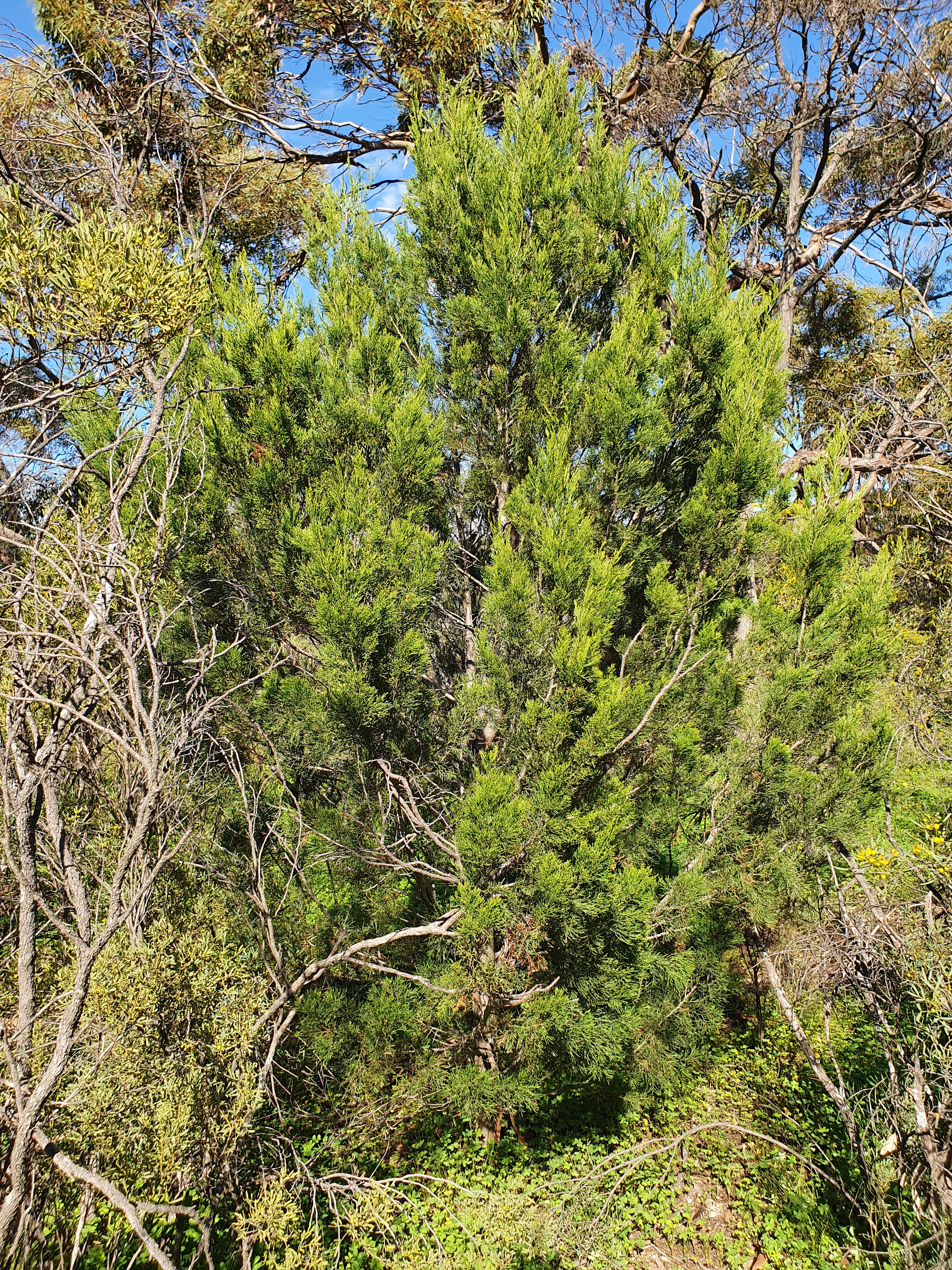

Scientific classification
- Kingdom: Plantae
- Clade: Tracheophytes
- Clade: Gymnosperms
- Division: Pinophyta
- Class: Pinopsida
- Order: Cupressales
- Family: Cupressaceae
- Genus: Callitris
- Species: C. gracilis

Binomial name
- Callitris gracilis R.Baker

Synonyms
- Callitris gracilis subsp. murrayensis (J.Garden) K.D.Hill; Callitris preissii var. murrayensis (J.Garden) Silba; Callitris preissii subsp. murrayensis J.Garden

= Callitris gracilis =

Species of plant

Callitris gracilis, the slender cypress-pine, is a species of conifer in the cypress family, Cupressaceae, native to southern Australia.

== Description ==
It is a broad conical tree growing up to 20 m high. The leaves are reduced to tiny scales, which clasp the flexible green stems. It is monoecious, with the tiny male and female cones occurring on the same tree. The male cones are capable of shedding huge clouds of pollen in winter. The mature woody globe-shaped cone is 2.5-4 cm in diameter, with six thick valvate scales that open at maturity to release papery-winged seeds. The cones may persist on the tree for many years, and each one can hold up to 30 seeds.

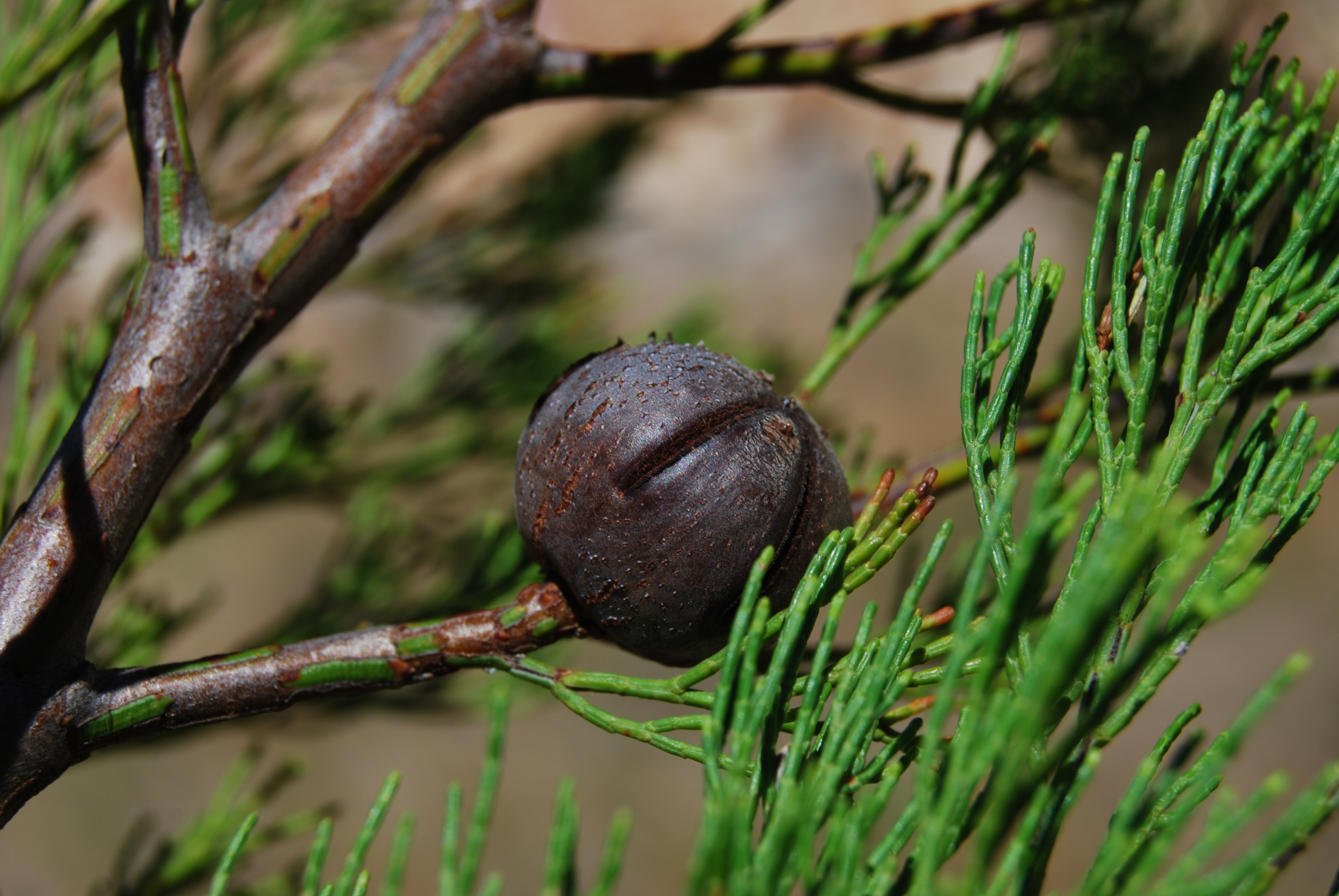
Leaves and mature cone

== Taxonomy ==
Callitris gracilis was formerly included in Callitris preissii, but that name is now restricted to plants from the Perth area.

== Distribution and habitat ==
Callitris gracilis can be found in Western Australia, South Australia, Victoria and New South Wales.

== Ecology ==
Several species of parrot eat the seeds in the maturing cones.

== Uses ==
Indigenous people from some areas use the foliage to make infusions for the relief of coughs and colds, and to make smoke medicine.

The tree was highly prized by European settlers for its straight trunk and termite-resistant wood.

In cultivation they make attractive feature trees for large gardens or parks. Seed should be stratified before sowing in late winter. Once established, it becomes a long-lived and hardy evergreen tree.
