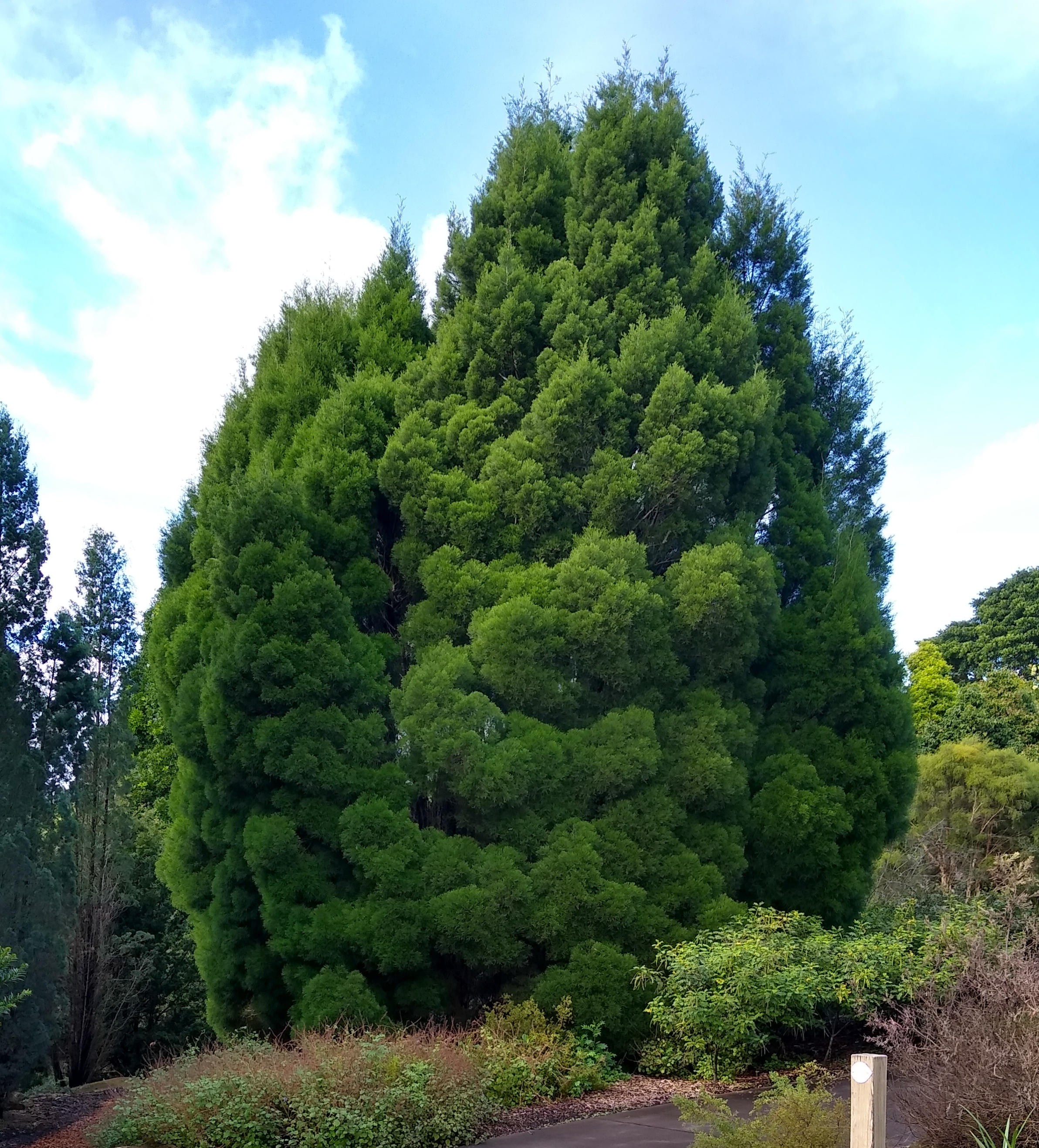
- At Australian Botanic Garden Mount Annan

Conservation status
- Near Threatened (IUCN 3.1)

Scientific classification
- Kingdom: Plantae
- Clade: Tracheophytes
- Clade: Gymnosperms
- Division: Pinophyta
- Class: Pinopsida
- Order: Cupressales
- Family: Cupressaceae
- Genus: Callitris
- Species: C. baileyi

Binomial name
- Callitris baileyi C.White

= Callitris baileyi =

Species of conifer

Callitris baileyi is a species of conifer in the cypress family, Cupressaceae. It is found only in Australia, more specifically Southeast Queensland. Its common name is Bailey's cypress-pine. The name is dedicated to Australian botanist Frederick Manson Bailey, who was the first to collect specimens of this tree. Bailey's name is closely associated with much of the flora of Queensland and their elucidation in southeastern Queensland. Over the past few decades the conifer has been severely threatened by habitat loss. Fruiting for the species has been recorded year-round.

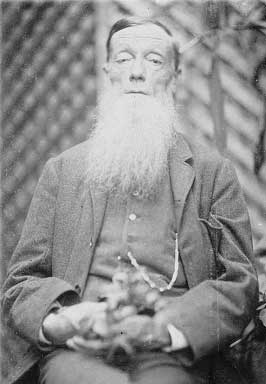
Frederick Manson Bailey, the first European to collect Callitris baileyi

== Description ==
Callitris baileyi is a slender tree growing to a height of 18m with rough greyish looking bark, and with a green crown. The adult leaves are green with an average size of 25 mm long, which are arranged in groups of three that run parallel with the stem. The branchlets have a grooved appearance due to the base of the leaves running down the stem as a wing. Cones form on slender fruiting branchlets that are solitary and separated from one another. Both the male and female cones form on the same tree, with the male cones appearing on the end of branchlets at a size of 2–3 mm long, while the female cone forms on a branchlet that has a waxy, greyish-blue coloring during its development. The female cone is oblong in shape and measures 10–13 mm in diameter. The cones are covered in scales that alternate and are short and narrow. The central stalk of the cone is short, narrow at the base and slightly angled. The seeds produced are few in number, with only two unequal wings.

== Range and habitat ==
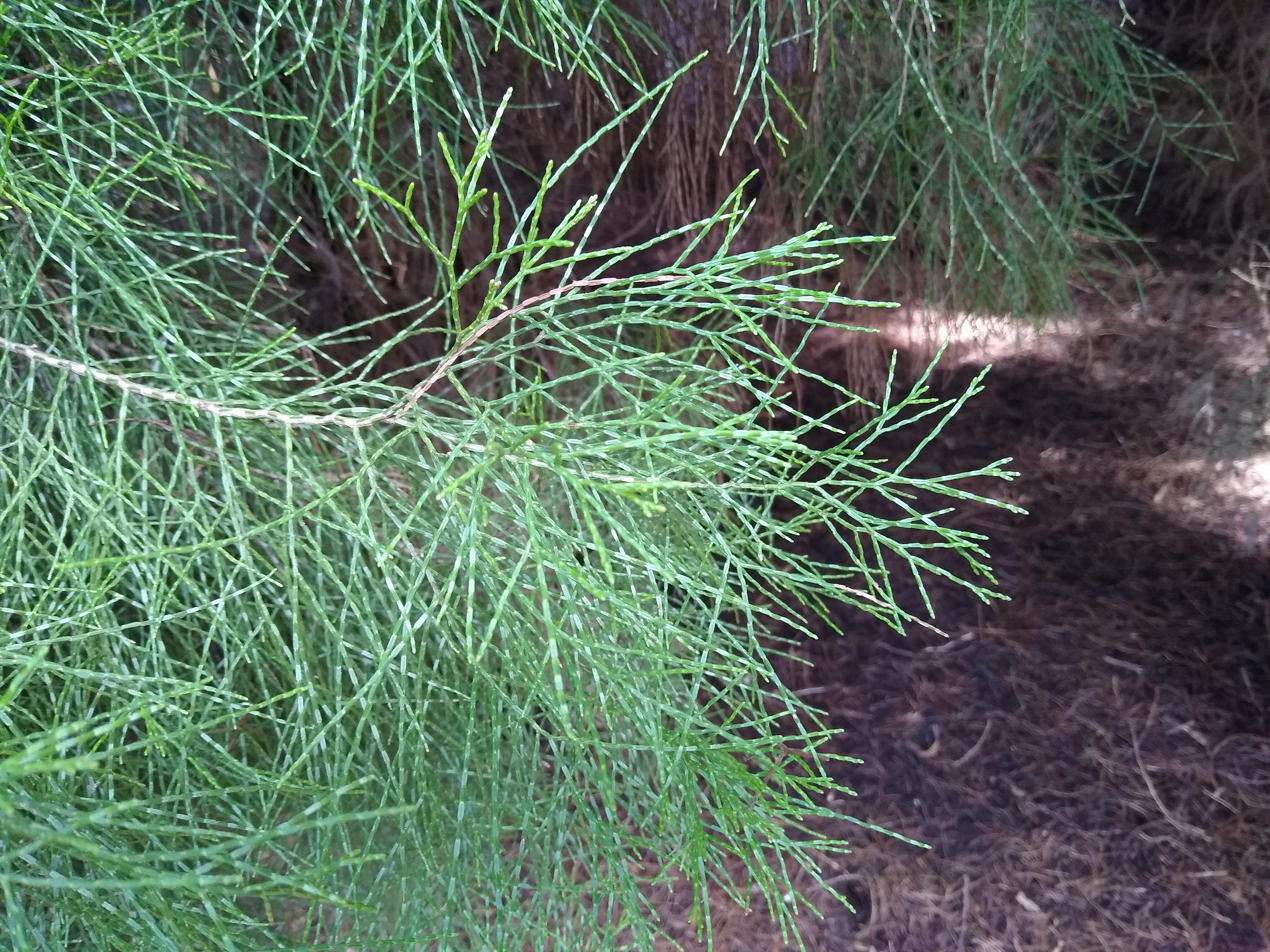
Callitris baileyi

Callitris baileyi is found sporadically in southeast Queensland, Australia, with more than ten known locations ranging from the state border of Queensland, to Goomeri in northern Australia, and as far west as the Bunya Mountains. However, there have been some smaller patches found on private land and in areas such as the Koreelah National Park west of Woodenbong. These subpopulations have been severely reduced due to widespread habitat fragmentation throughout its range.

Callitris baileyi was once found in Acacia Creek and Sandilands near Tabulam in New South Wales; however, it has now ceased to occupy these areas.

Callitris baileyi grows on rocky slopes of hilly or mountainous areas, in shallow and often clay soils. It occurs over an area between 15,000 and 25,000 km^{2}. It is found in eucalypt woodland, commonly associated with ironbark, blue gum and spotted gum. The New South Wales subpopulation emerges in open grassy eucalypt forest near creeks.

== Habitat decline and conservation ==
Over the years the population of Callitris baileyi has been in decline to the point of Near Threatened (IUCN 3.1) status. This has largely been due to inappropriate fire regimes, in particular frequent low-intensity burning to reduce fuel loads. This method is used to promote grass growth for cattle grazing or agriculture, which over time prevents regeneration and can lead to the elimination of the species subpopulations. This type of fragmentation of the species is becoming more prevalent outside of national parks.

Another factor in the species' habitat decline is the invasion by alien weeds. The invasive weed Lantana camara is a problem in some parts of its range in Queensland.

Recent conservation efforts have been made by the New South Wales state legislation listing the species as Endangered, while in Queensland it is listed as Near Threatened. C. baileyi has been recorded in several national parks, such as the Bunya Mountains National Park in Queensland and Koreelah National Park in New South Wales.
