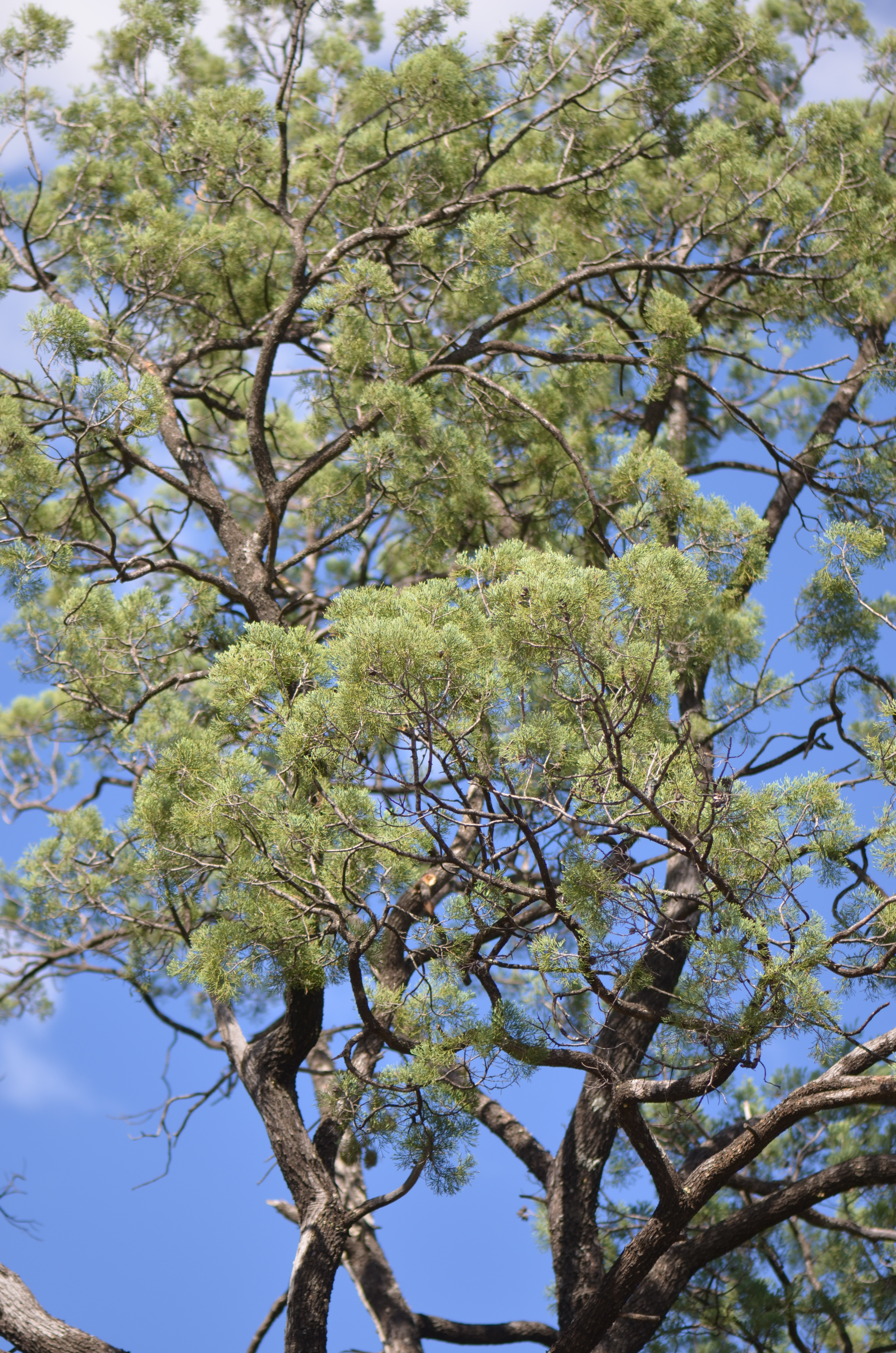

Conservation status
- Least Concern (IUCN 3.1)

Scientific classification
- Kingdom: Plantae
- Clade: Tracheophytes
- Clade: Gymnosperms
- Division: Pinophyta
- Class: Pinopsida
- Order: Cupressales
- Family: Cupressaceae
- Genus: Callitris
- Species: C. columellaris

Binomial name
- Callitris columellaris F.Muell.

Synonyms
- Callitris arenosa A.Cunn. ex R.T.Baker & H.G.Sm.; Callitris hugelii (Carrière) Franco; Callitris intermedia R.T.Baker & H.G.Sm.; Frenela columellaris (F.Muell.) Parl.; Frenela moorei Parl.; Frenela verrucosa var. laevis C.Moore; Octoclinis backhousei W.Hill

= Callitris columellaris =

Species of conifer

Callitris columellaris is a species of coniferous tree in the cypress family, Cupressaceae, native to most of Australia. Common names include white cypress, white cypress-pine, Murray River cypress-pine, Bribie Island pine and northern cypress-pine. Callitris columellaris has become naturalised in Hawaii and in southern Florida.

== Description ==
It is a small coniferous tree, 4–12 m (rarely to 20 m) high, with a trunk up to 50 cm diameter. The leaves are scale-like, 2–6 mm long and 0.5 mm broad, arranged in decussate whorls of three on very slender shoots 0.7–1 mm diameter. The cones are globose, 1–2 cm diameter, with six triangular scales, which open at maturity to release the seeds. It has deeply furrowed bark.

== Taxonomy ==
Some authors (e.g. Thompson & Johnson 1986, followed by the Flora of Australia Online and Plants of the World Online) divide it into three species (or occasionally as varieties), based largely on the foliage colour, with green plants predominating on the east coast of Australia, and glaucous plants in the interior, and on cone size, with on average marginally smaller cones in tropical areas (north of 22°S). However, others (e.g. Blake 1959, Farjon 2005) point out that both the foliage colour and cone size is very variable, even from tree to tree in local populations, and maintain that it is impossible to distinguish three taxa within the species. When split into three species, the following names apply:

- Callitris columellaris F.Muell. sensu stricto – coastal northeast New South Wales, southeast Queensland.
- Callitris glaucophylla J.Thomps. & L.A.S.Johnson (syn. C. columellaris var. campestris Silba) – throughout most of the southern half of Australia.
- Callitris intratropica R.T.Baker & H.G.Smith (syn. C. columellaris var. intratropica (R.T.Baker & H.G.Sm.) Silba) – northern Queensland, northern Northern Territory, northern Western Australia.

== Pollination ==
Eric Rolls described the pollination of C.columellaris thus: "At pollination time when hundreds of cones go off together with a sharp crack and spurt brown pollen a metre into the air, the whole tree shivers."

== Gallery ==
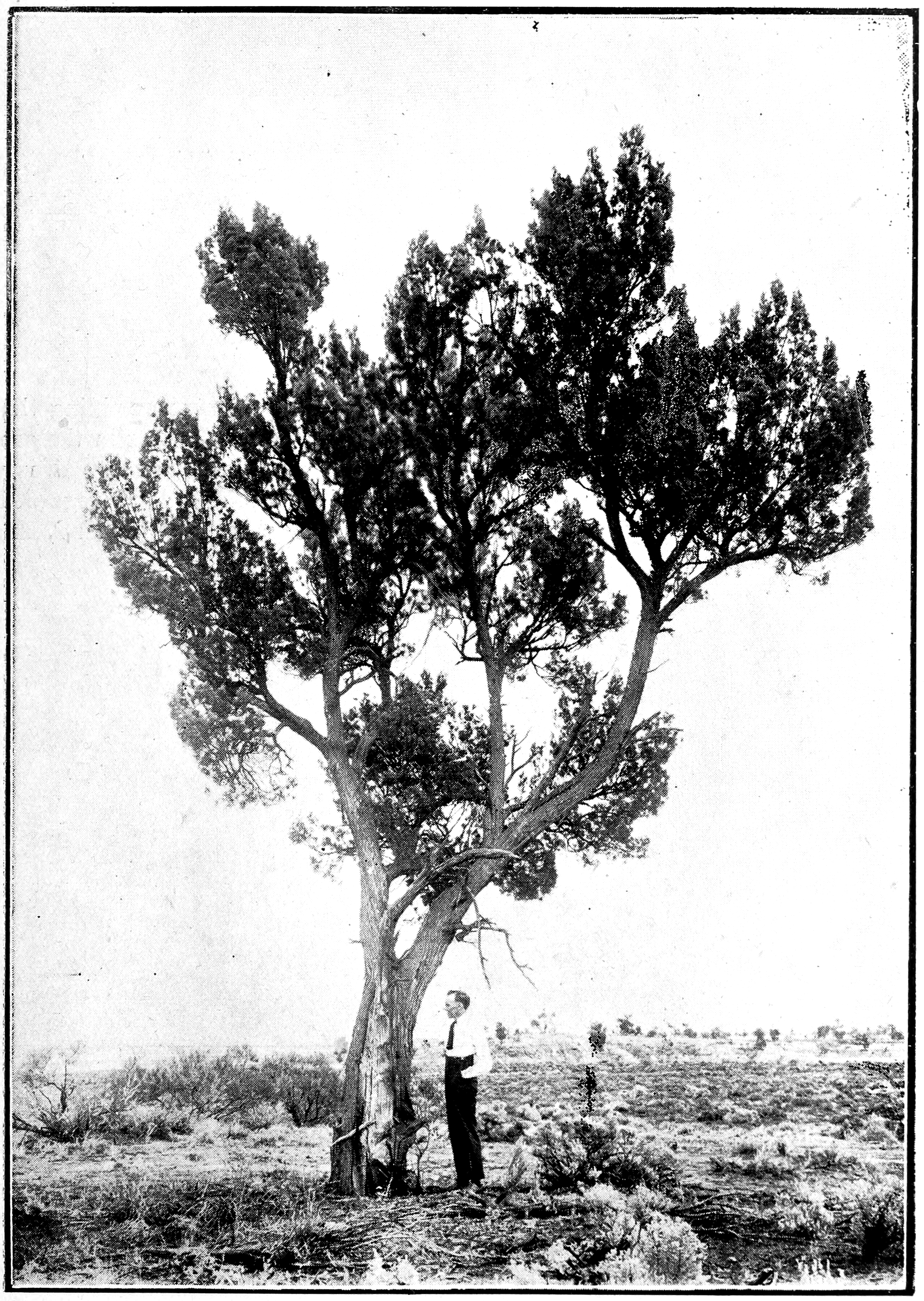
Mature tree, circa 1920

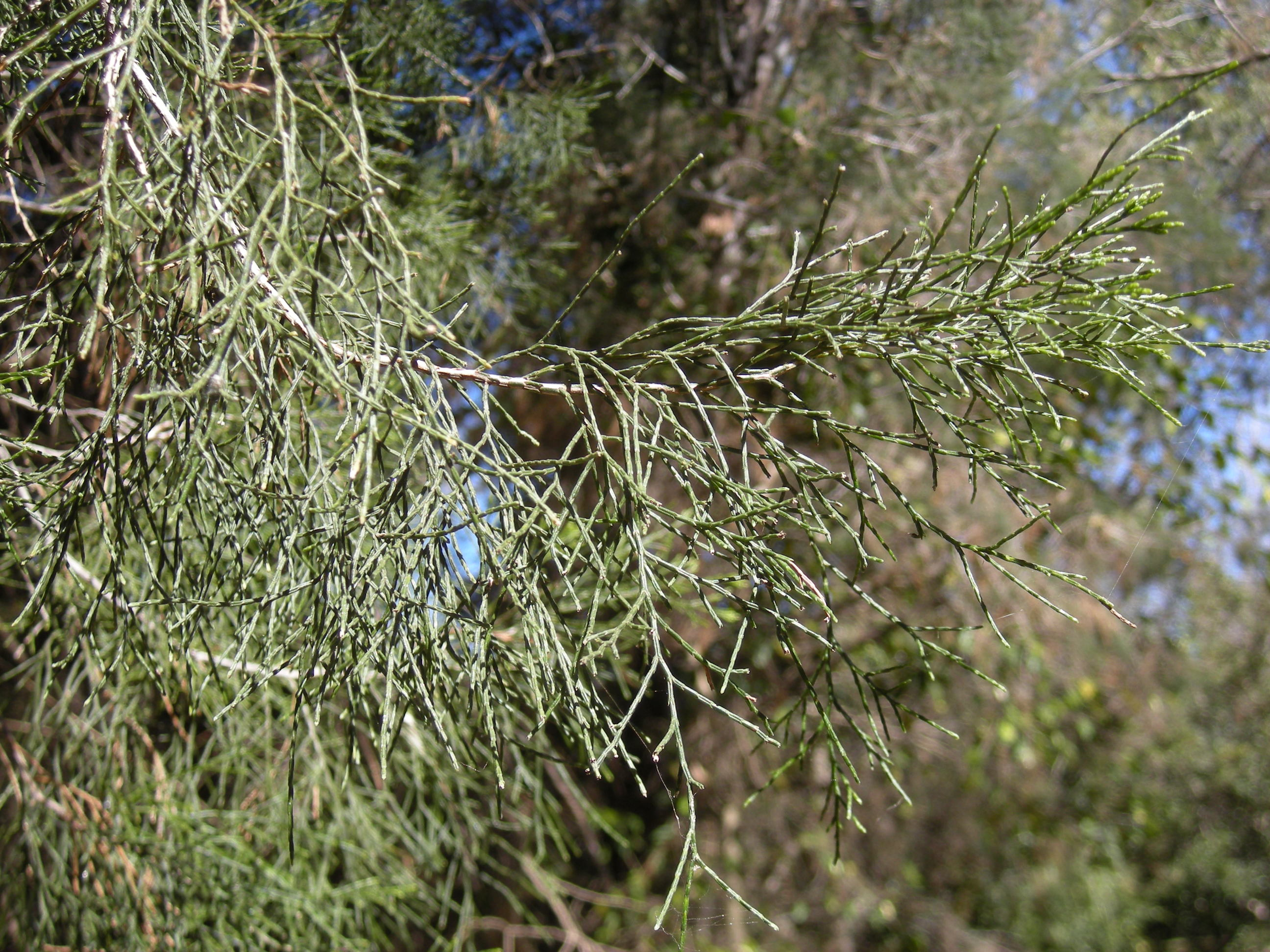
C. columellaris foliage

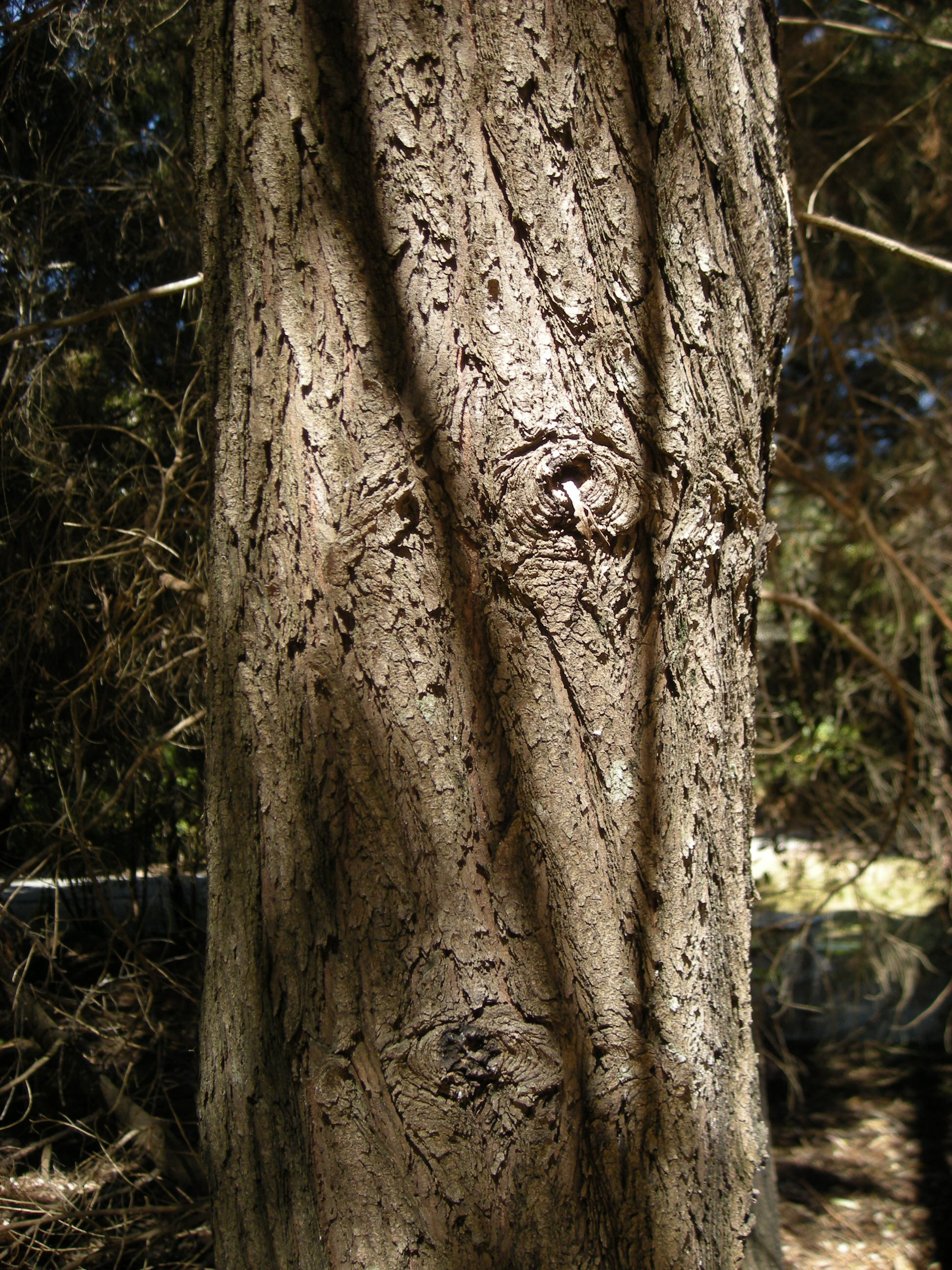
C. columellaris bark

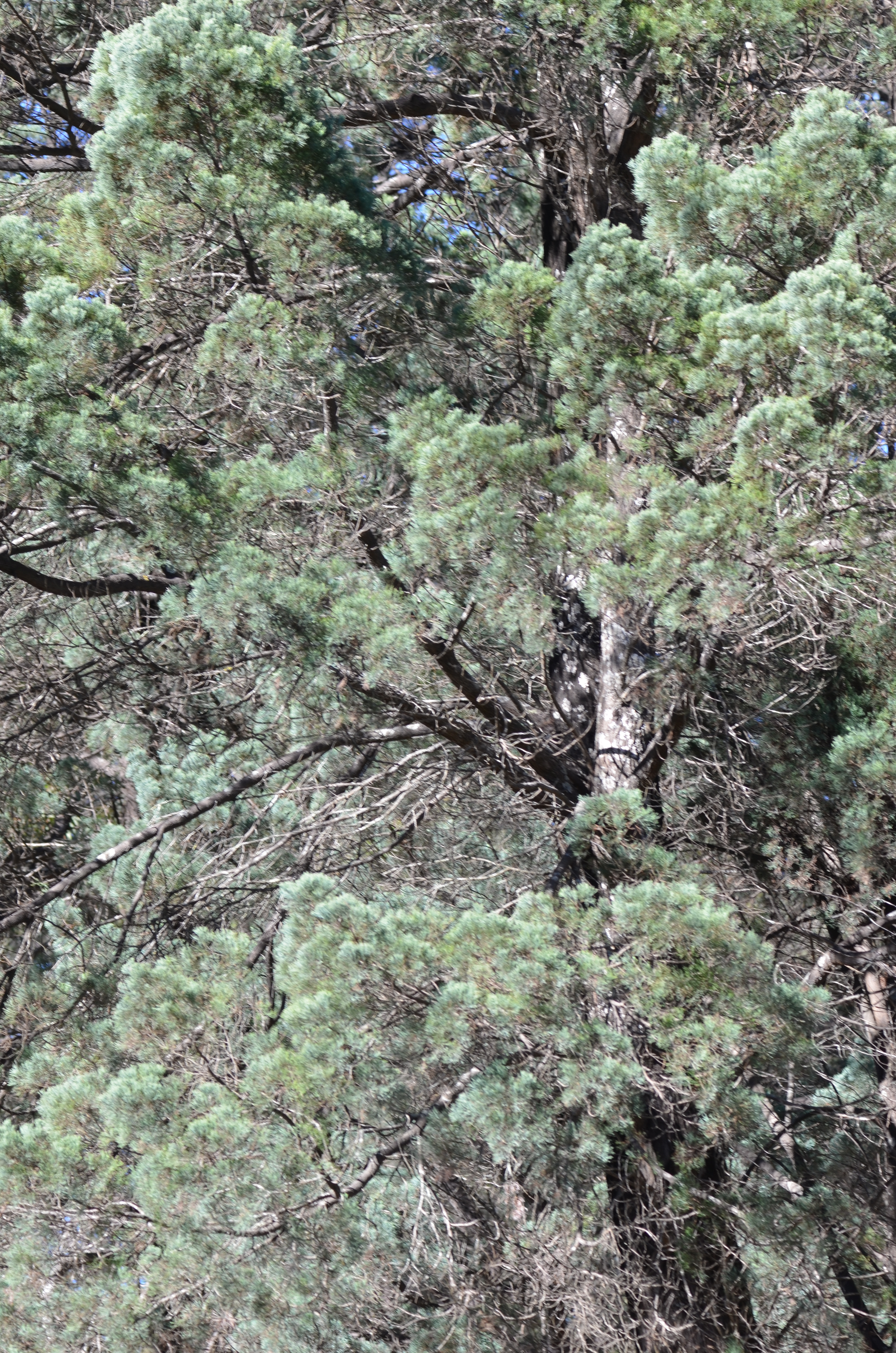
Mature tree

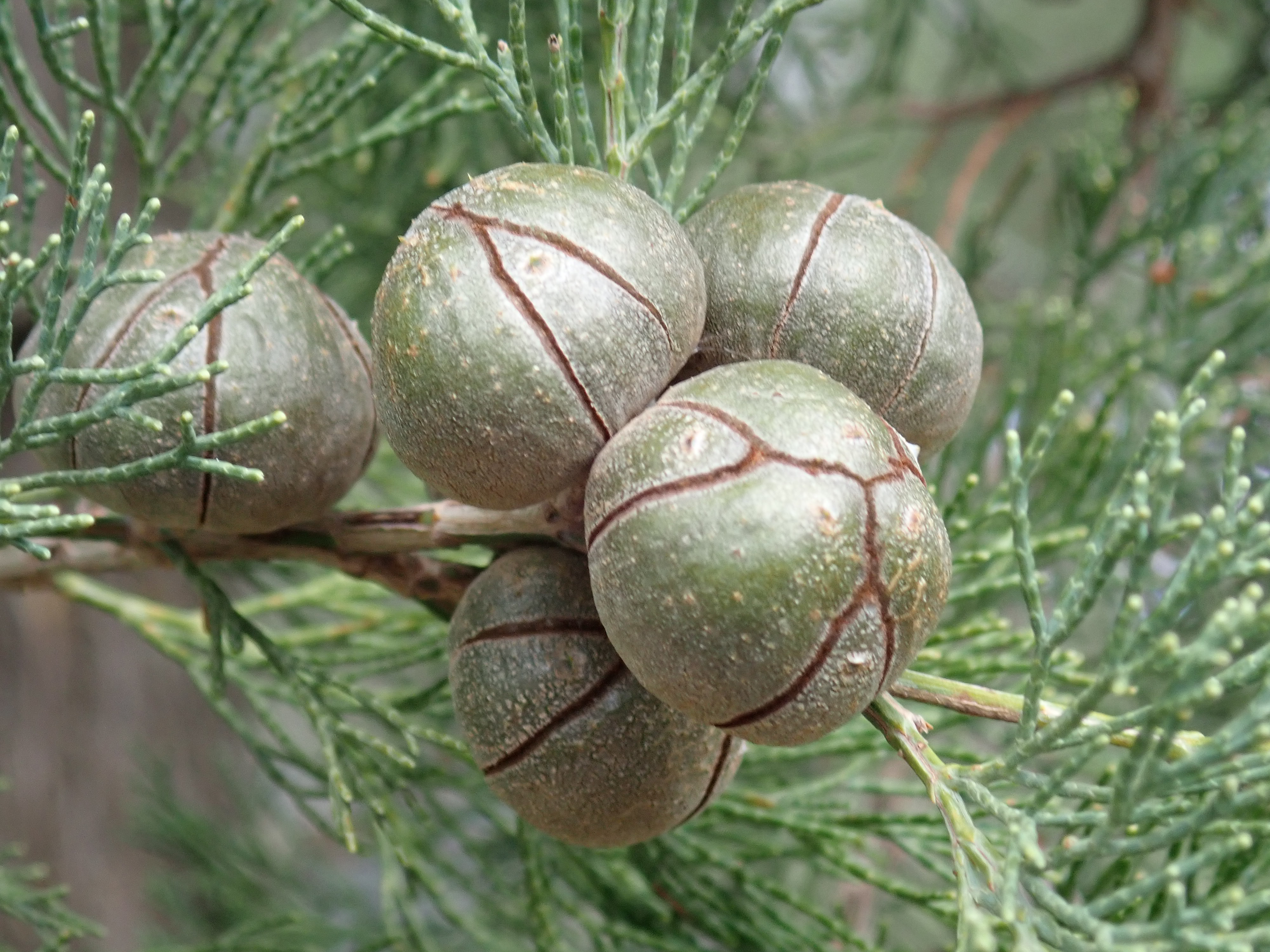
Green fruit, Narrabri Shire

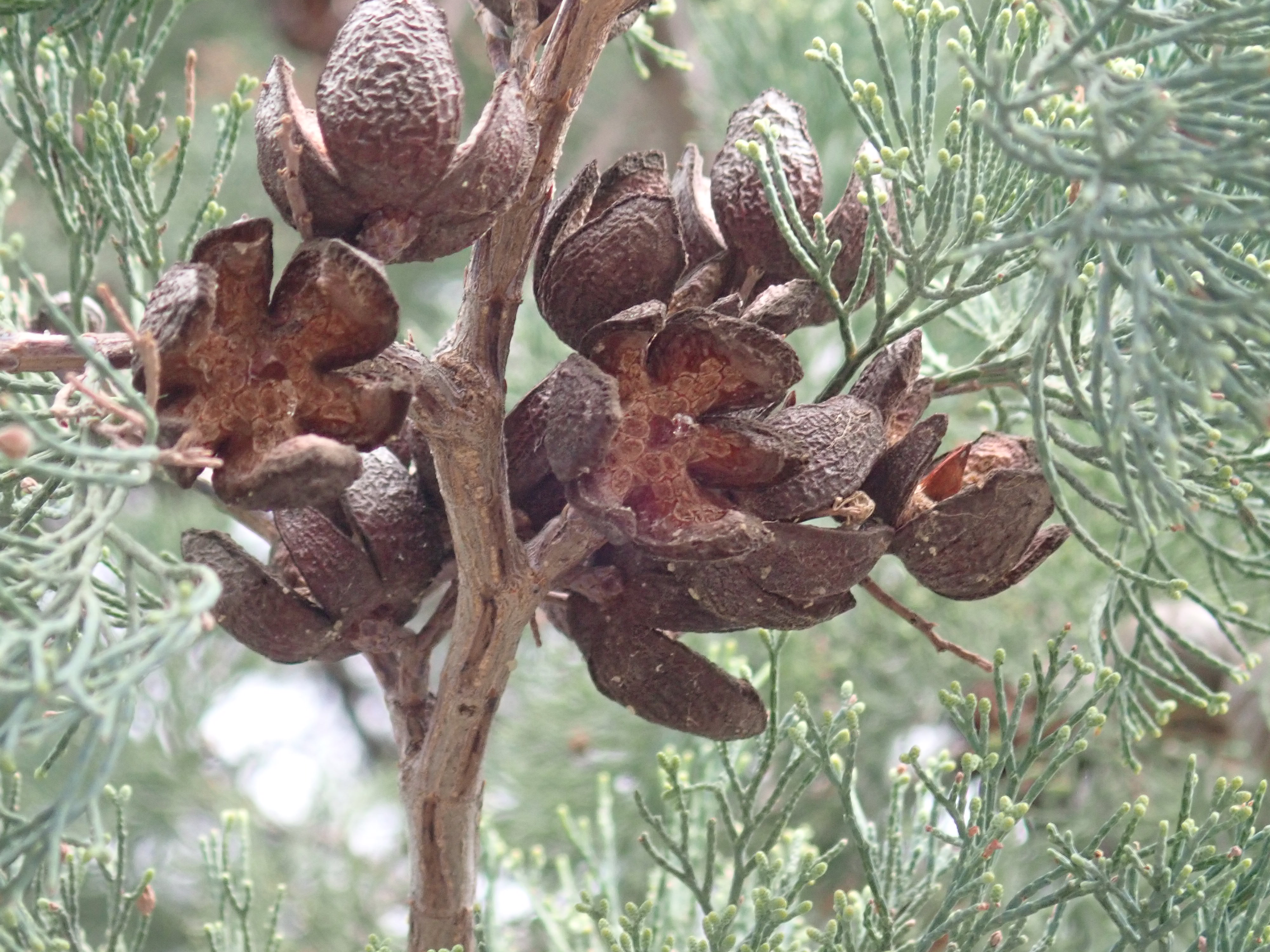
Mature fruit, Narrabri Shire
