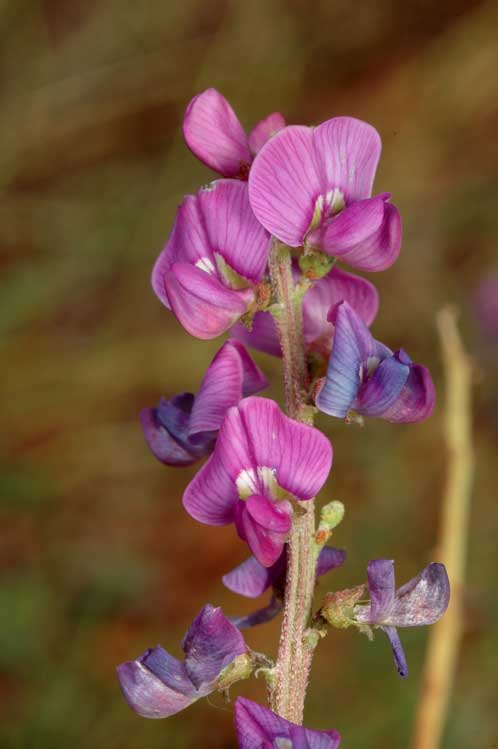
- Near Girilambone

Scientific classification
- Kingdom: Plantae
- Clade: Tracheophytes
- Clade: Angiosperms
- Clade: Eudicots
- Clade: Rosids
- Order: Fabales
- Family: Fabaceae
- Subfamily: Faboideae
- Genus: Swainsona
- Species: S. affinis

Binomial name
- Swainsona affinis (A.T.Lee) Joy Thomps.

Synonyms
- Swainsona affinis M.Henry nom. inval., nom. nud.; Swainsona microphylla subsp. affinis A.T.Lee; Swainsona microphylla subsp. glabrescens A.T.Lee; Swainsona microphylla subsp. pallescens A.T.Lee; Swainsona microphylla var. affinis J.M.Black nom. inval., nom. nud.

= Swainsona affinis =

Species of legume

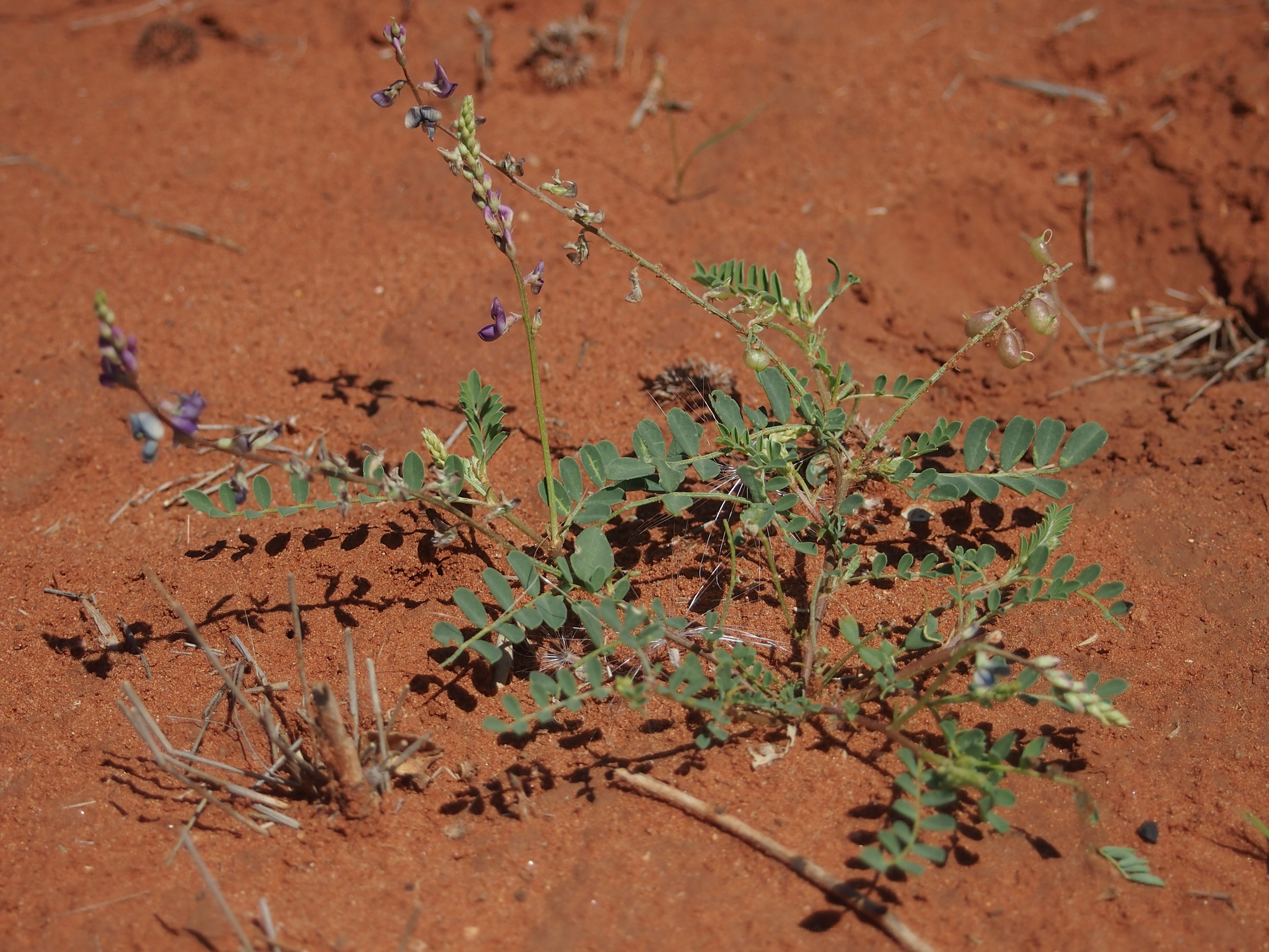
Habit near the Finke River, Northern Territory

Swainsona affinis, commonly known as common poison pea, is a species of flowering plant in the family Fabaceae and is endemic to arid areas of inland Australia. It is a prostrate perennial herb with imparipinnate leaves with 7 to 25 broadly elliptic leaflets, and racemes of purple, pink, yellow or white flowers.

== Description ==
Swainsona affinis is a prostrate perennial herb, that typically grows to a height of up to 25 cm (9.8 in) and has softly-hairy stems. The leaves are imparipinnate, 30–50 mm (1.2–2.0 in) long with 7 to 25 broadly elliptic leaflets, the leaflets 5–15 mm (0.20–0.59 in) long and 3–8 mm (0.12–0.31 in) wide. The flowers are arranged in racemes 10–150 mm (0.39–5.91 in) long of 5 to 35 or more on a peduncle 70–300 mm (2.8–11.8 in) long, each flower 8–10 mm (0.31–0.39 in) long. The sepals are joined at the base, forming a tube with lobes shorter than the sepal tube. The petals are purple, pink, yellow or white. Flowering occurs from June to August, and the fruit is a broadly oblong, oval or spherical pod 5–11 mm (0.20–0.43 in) long with the remains of the style 2.5–4.5 mm (0.098–0.177 in) wide.

== Taxonomy and naming ==
This species was first formally described in 1948 by Alma Theodora Lee who gave it the name Swainsona microphylla subsp. affinis in Contributions from the New South Wales National Herbarium. In 1990 Joy Thompson raised it to species status as S. affinis in the journal Telopea. The specific epithet (affinis) means "allied to" (a closely related species).

== Distribution and habitat ==
Swainsona affinis grows in red sand or sandy loam on the edges of salt lakes, in claypans, on sand dunes or along creek lines, often with mulga and Callitris species. It is widespread in the arid inland areas of Western Australia and South Australia, the south of the Northern Territory, in Queensland and west of Narrabri in New South Wales.
