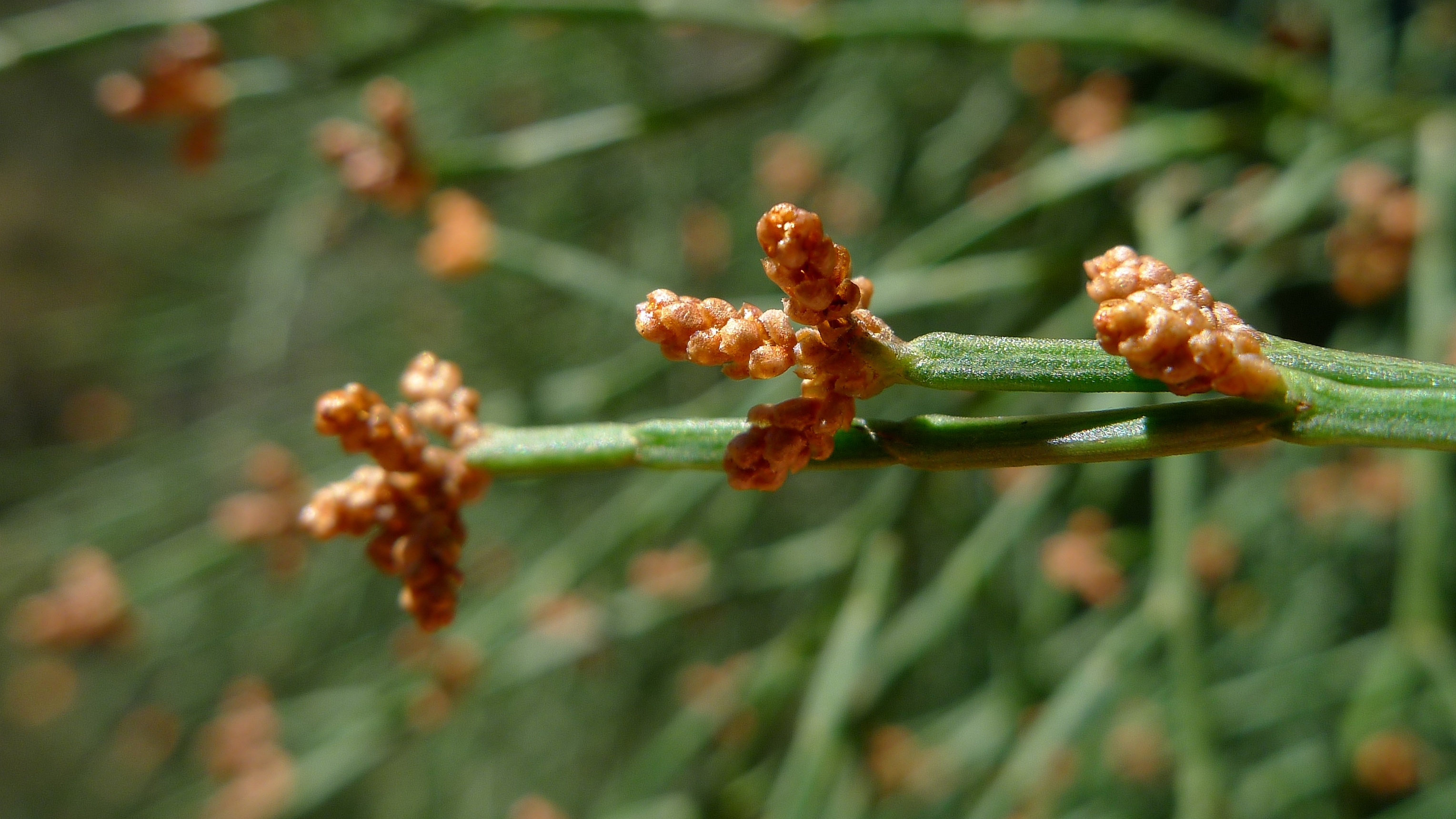
- Male pollen cones, Royal National Park

Conservation status
- Least Concern (IUCN 3.1)

Scientific classification
- Kingdom: Plantae
- Clade: Embryophytes
- Clade: Tracheophytes
- Clade: Gymnosperms
- Division: Pinophyta
- Class: Pinopsida
- Order: Cupressales
- Family: Cupressaceae
- Genus: Callitris
- Species: C. muelleri

Binomial name
- Callitris muelleri Benth. & Hook.f.ex F.Muell.

= Callitris muelleri =

Species of conifer

Callitris muelleri is a species of conifer in the cypress family, Cupressaceae. It is endemic to New South Wales, Australia.

== Description ==
Callitris muelleri is a small tree or shrub growing to 6 meters tall. The leaves are hairless, glaucous to green in colour, with mature leaves measuring 5-10 mm long, and juvenile leaves longer. This species is monoecious. The male cones measure 3 mm long and occur in clusters at the ends of the leaves, while the female cones are spherical, measure 20-30 mm in diameter, occur solitarily or in clusters, and may remain on the branches after maturity.
