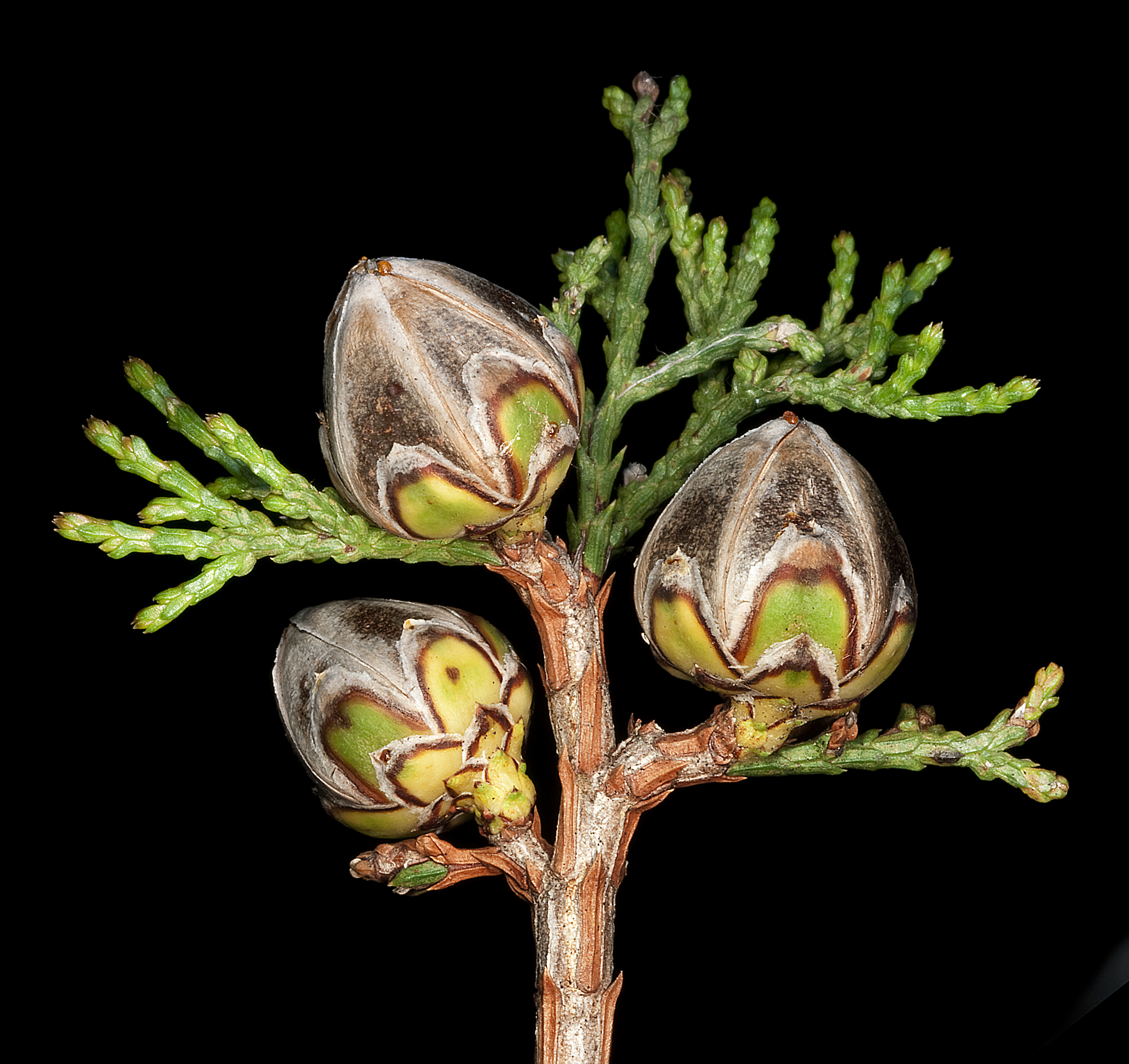

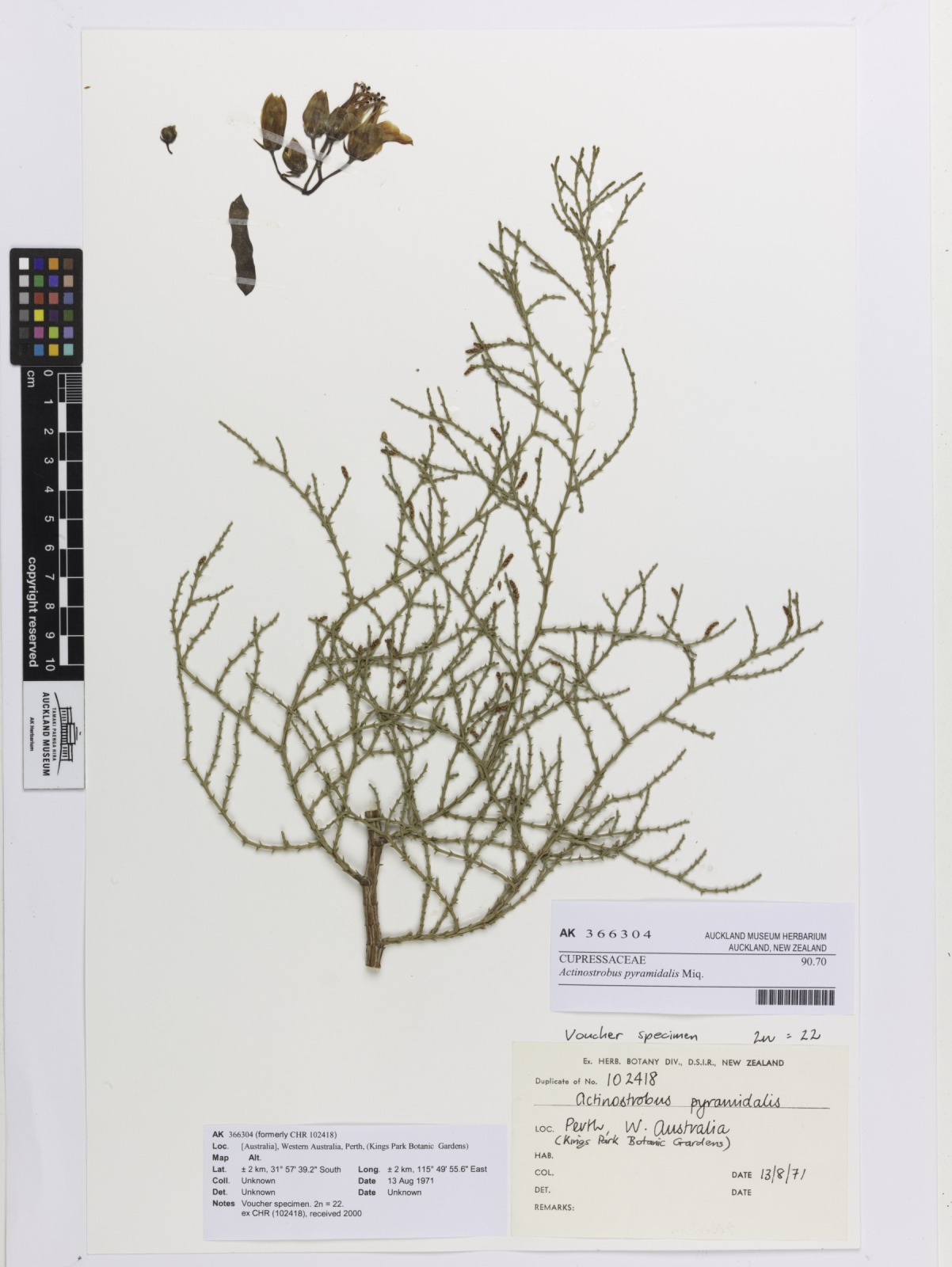
- (AM AK366304)

Conservation status
- Least Concern (IUCN 3.1)

Scientific classification
- Kingdom: Plantae
- Clade: Tracheophytes
- Clade: Gymnosperms
- Division: Pinophyta
- Class: Pinopsida
- Order: Cupressales
- Family: Cupressaceae
- Genus: Callitris
- Species: C. pyramidalis

Binomial name
- Callitris pyramidalis (Miq.) J.E.Piggin & J.J.Bruhl

Synonyms
- Actinostrobus pyramidalis Miq.; Callitris actinostrobus F.Muell.; Frenela actinostrobus (F.Muell.) F.Muell.

= Callitris pyramidalis =

Species of conifer

Callitris pyramidalis (synonym Actinostrobus pyramidalis), the swamp cypress, Swan River cypress, or King George's cypress pine, is a species of coniferous tree in the cypress family, Cupressaceae. It is endemic to southwestern Western Australia.

Swamp cypress is a shrub or small tree, reaching eight metres tall. The leaves are scale-like, except on young seedlings, where they are needle-like. The leaves are arranged in six rows along the twigs, in alternating whorls of three. The male cones are small, 3–6 mm long, and are located at the tips of the twigs. The female cones start out similarly inconspicuous, but mature in 18–20 months to 1–2 cm with a rounded apex.

The cones open and release the seeds only upon drying. They tend to remain closed on the trees for many years, opening only if the branch, or the whole tree, dies. Bushfire kills swamp cypress, but it also causes a great many seeds to be released all at once, resulting in prolific regeneration. In one case, an isolated tree on Jeegarnyeejip Island was killed by fire, and the following winter there were 800 seedlings per square metre within a couple of metres of the original specimen, and about 150 per square metre ten metres away.

The species was first collected from Perth in September 1841 by Johann August Ludwig Preiss, and a description was published by Friedrich Anton Wilhelm Miquel in 1845 as Actinostrobus pyramidalis. A 2010 study of the genera Actinostrobus and Callitris found that all three species of Actinostrobus lay within the current concept of Callitris based on analysis of 42 morphological and anatomical characters, hence Actinostrobus pyramidalis was renamed Callitris pyramidalis.
