= Callitris neocaledonica =

Conservation status
- Near Threatened (IUCN 3.1)

Scientific classification
- Kingdom: Plantae
- Clade: Tracheophytes
- Clade: Gymnosperms
- Division: Pinophyta
- Class: Pinopsida
- Order: Cupressales
- Family: Cupressaceae
- Genus: Callitris
- Species: C. neocaledonica

Binomial name
- Callitris neocaledonica Dümmer

Synonyms
- Nothocallitris neocaledonica (Dümmer) A.V.Bobrov & Melikyan; Callitris sulcata var. alpina Compton

Species of conifer

Callitris neocaledonica is a species of conifer in the cypress family, Cupressaceae. It is a shrub or tree endemic to New Caledonia. It is threatened by habitat loss.
