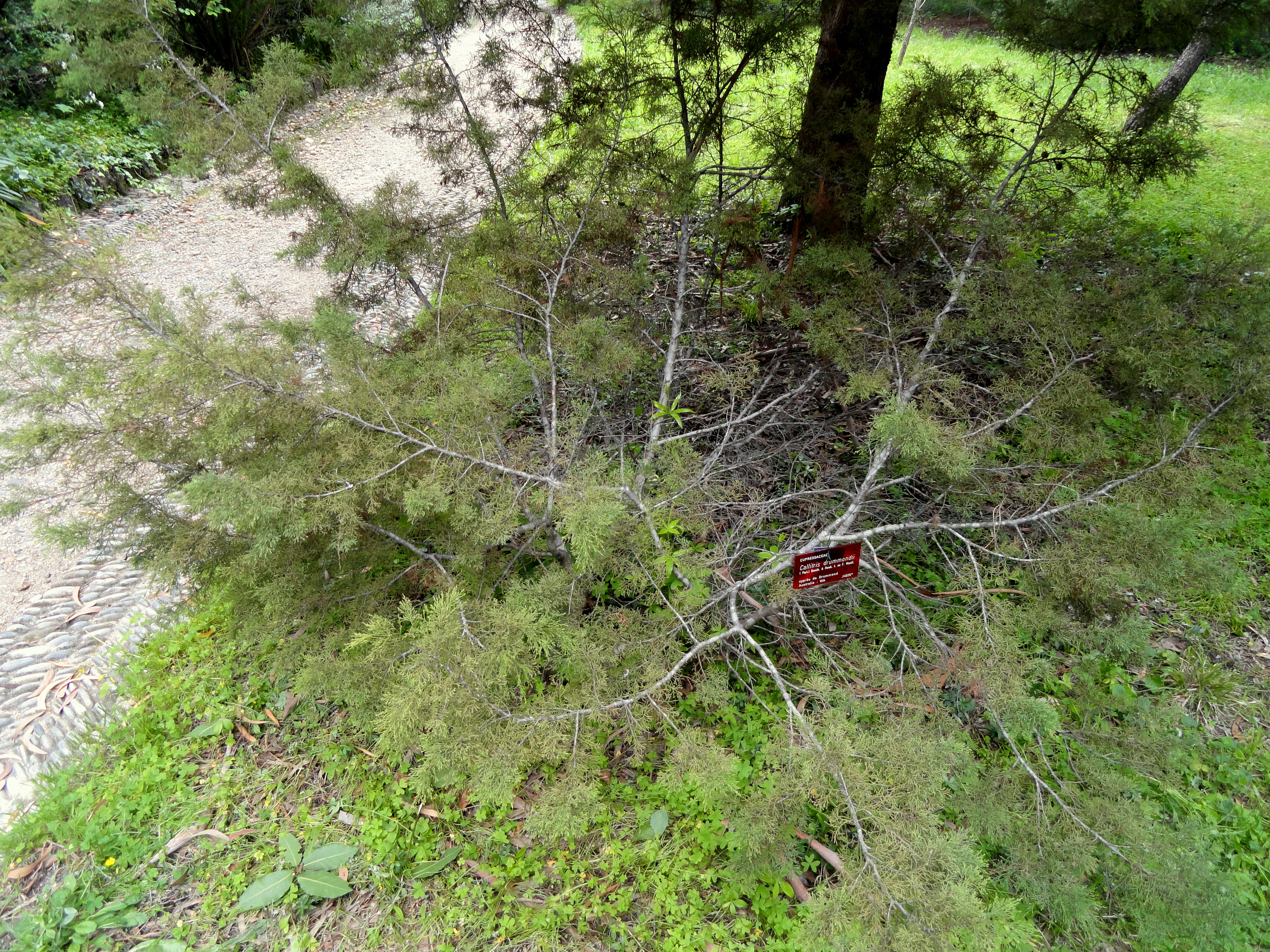

Conservation status
- Near Threatened (IUCN 3.1)

Scientific classification
- Kingdom: Plantae
- Clade: Embryophytes
- Clade: Tracheophytes
- Clade: Gymnosperms
- Division: Pinophyta
- Class: Pinopsida
- Order: Cupressales
- Family: Cupressaceae
- Genus: Callitris
- Species: C. drummondii

Binomial name
- Callitris drummondii (Parl.) F.Muell., 1882

= Callitris drummondii =

Species of conifer

Callitris drummondii, or Drummond's cypress, is a species of conifer in the cypress family, Cupressaceae. It is endemic to Western Australia. It is threatened by habitat loss.
