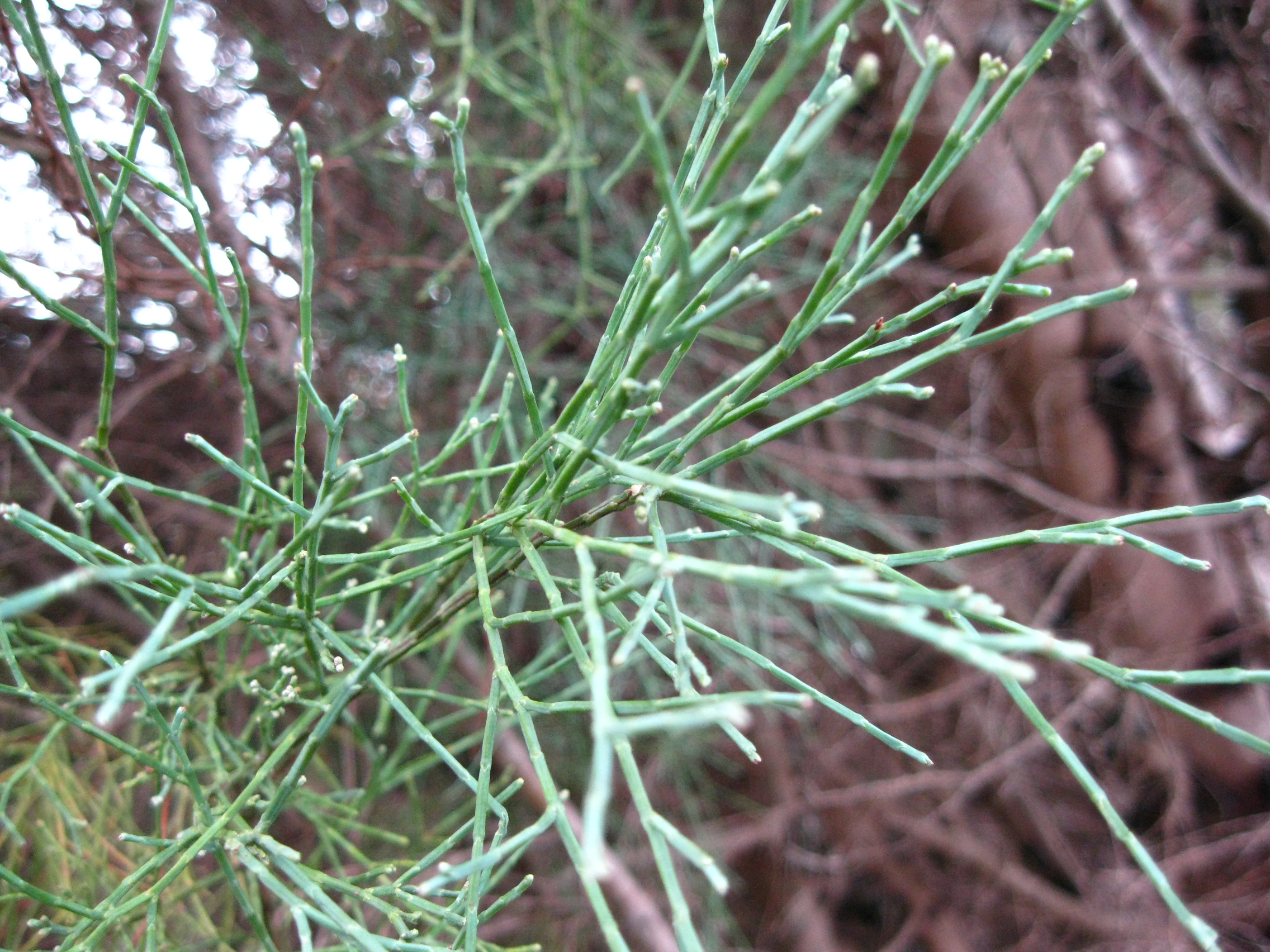

Conservation status
- Vulnerable (IUCN 3.1)

Scientific classification
- Kingdom: Plantae
- Clade: Tracheophytes
- Clade: Gymnosperms
- Division: Pinophyta
- Class: Pinopsida
- Order: Cupressales
- Family: Cupressaceae
- Genus: Callitris
- Species: C. oblonga

Binomial name
- Callitris oblonga A. Rich. & Rich.

Subspecies
- C. o. subsp. oblonga; C. o. subsp. corangensis K.D. Hill; C. o. subsp. parva K.D. Hill

= Callitris oblonga =

Species of conifer

Callitris oblonga, the South Esk pine, pygmy cypress pine, river pine, or Tasmanian cypress pine, is a species of conifer in the cypress family, Cupressaceae. It is endemic to Australia, where it is native to New South Wales and Tasmania, with one subspecies introduced in Victoria. It is considered vulnerable and faces a number of threats including land clearing, habitat degradation, and damage from or competition with invasive species. Callitris oblonga forms a wetland community with Eucalyptus ovata known as the Eucalyptus ovata—Callitris oblonga forests.

== Taxonomy ==
There are three subspecies currently recognised:

- C. o. oblonga – northeast Tasmania, introduced in Victoria
- C. o. corangensis (K.D. Hill) – New England Tablelands in northern New South Wales
- C. o. parva (K.D. Hill) – Corang River catchment in southern New South Wales

== Description ==
Callitris oblonga is a coniferous shrub or small tree growing to 5 meters tall with leaves measuring 4-5 millimeters long. This species is monoecious. The female cones are egg shaped, measuring 12-15 millimeters in diameter, sessile or borne on short fruiting branchlets, and may occur singly or in clusters.
