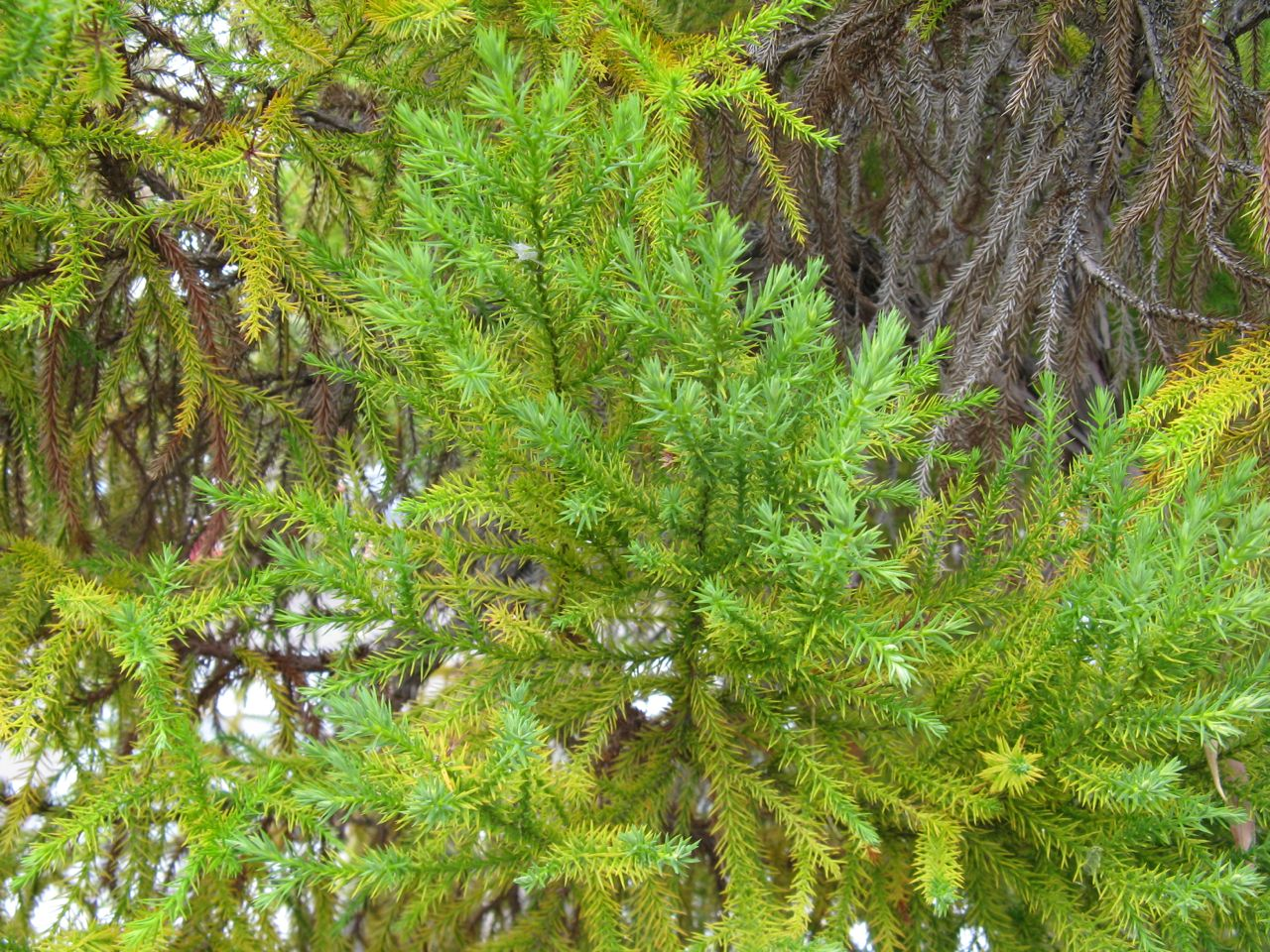

Conservation status
- Least Concern (IUCN 3.1)

Scientific classification
- Kingdom: Plantae
- Clade: Tracheophytes
- Clade: Gymnosperms
- Division: Pinophyta
- Class: Pinopsida
- Order: Cupressales
- Family: Cupressaceae
- Genus: Callitris
- Species: C. macleayana

Binomial name
- Callitris macleayana (F.Muell.) F.Muell.

= Callitris macleayana =

Species of conifer

Callitris macleayana, the stringybark pine, brush cypress pine, or Port Macquarie pine, is a species of conifer in the family Cupressaceae, endemic to Australia. The tree is not closely related to pines. Stringybark pine is found in two regions of Australia's east coast, one in the centre and one in the north.

== Description ==
Callitris macleayana is a large, straight-trunked tree with spreading branches and up to 40 metres in height. The bark is furrowed, and its juvenile leaves are around 1 cm in length, giving way to mature foliage of 2-3 mm; cones often occur in solitary on larger fruiting branches, and have 6 scales when borne on mature trees.

== Distribution and habitat ==
Stringybark pine occurs over much of the central and northeast coast of Australia with an estimated range of 20,000 km^{2}, although its range is divided in two with a 1500 km gap between the two occurrences. In the North, it is found in open forests upon humid highlands, mainly among Eucalyptus, Syncarpia, and Corymbia species; in the South, it is found in wet sclerophyll forests and occasionally in pockets of subtropical rainforest, the latter including Ficus and Podocarpus species. Within these habitats the stringybark pine prefers exposed locations, such as slopes and ridge tops, whilst generally being found in poorer soils. The tree's limitation to humid sites is in contrast to many other species in the genus, such as Callitris glaucophylla and C. endlicheri. The species has a cold hardiness of -1.1 °C to +4.4 °C, corresponding to hardiness Zone 10.
