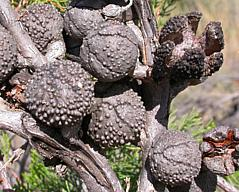

Conservation status
- Least Concern (IUCN 3.1)

Scientific classification
- Kingdom: Plantae
- Clade: Tracheophytes
- Clade: Gymnosperms
- Division: Pinophyta
- Class: Pinopsida
- Order: Cupressales
- Family: Cupressaceae
- Genus: Callitris
- Species: C. verrucosa

Binomial name
- Callitris verrucosa (A.Cunn. Ex Endl.) F.Muell.

= Callitris verrucosa =

Species of plant

Callitris verrucosa, the mallee pine, is a species of conifer in the cypress family, Cupressaceae. It is found only in Australia. The plant has a green-grey colour, rigid branches and can reach a height of 8 metres (26 ft). It has a slow growth rate.

== Description ==
Callitris verrucosa is a small tree or shrub which can reach the height of 8 m (26 ft). The mallee pine is typically multi-stemmed with erect branches.

The leaves are 2-4 mm long with a conical-rounded surface and green-grey coloured. The shrub produces cones which are 3 mm long in singular clusters for males, and approximately 20 mm long occurring in a bunch, for the female cones.

The mallee pine is an obligate seeder, and its seeds display serotiny. The species can be negatively affected by intense fires. However, it also requires fire to germinate seeds, making it a unique species.

=== Other names ===
Other names for the mallee pine include camphor wood and scrub cypress pine.

== Range and habitat ==
The mallee pine is endemic to Mallee Woodlands and Shrublands in southern Australia. It can be found in New South Wales, Victoria, South Australia and Western Australia. It prefers well-drained soils, and full sun. The conifer grows best in sandy soils, and can commonly be found on sand dunes within its habitat.

== Uses ==
The resin from various Callitris species were used by Aboriginal Australians as an adhesive for tools and weaponry. Long, straight branches were also fashioned into fishing spears.

The wood from the mallee pine is durable and insect resistant, and can be used for fencing.

== Conservation ==
The species is categorised as "least concern" on the IUCN Redlist.
