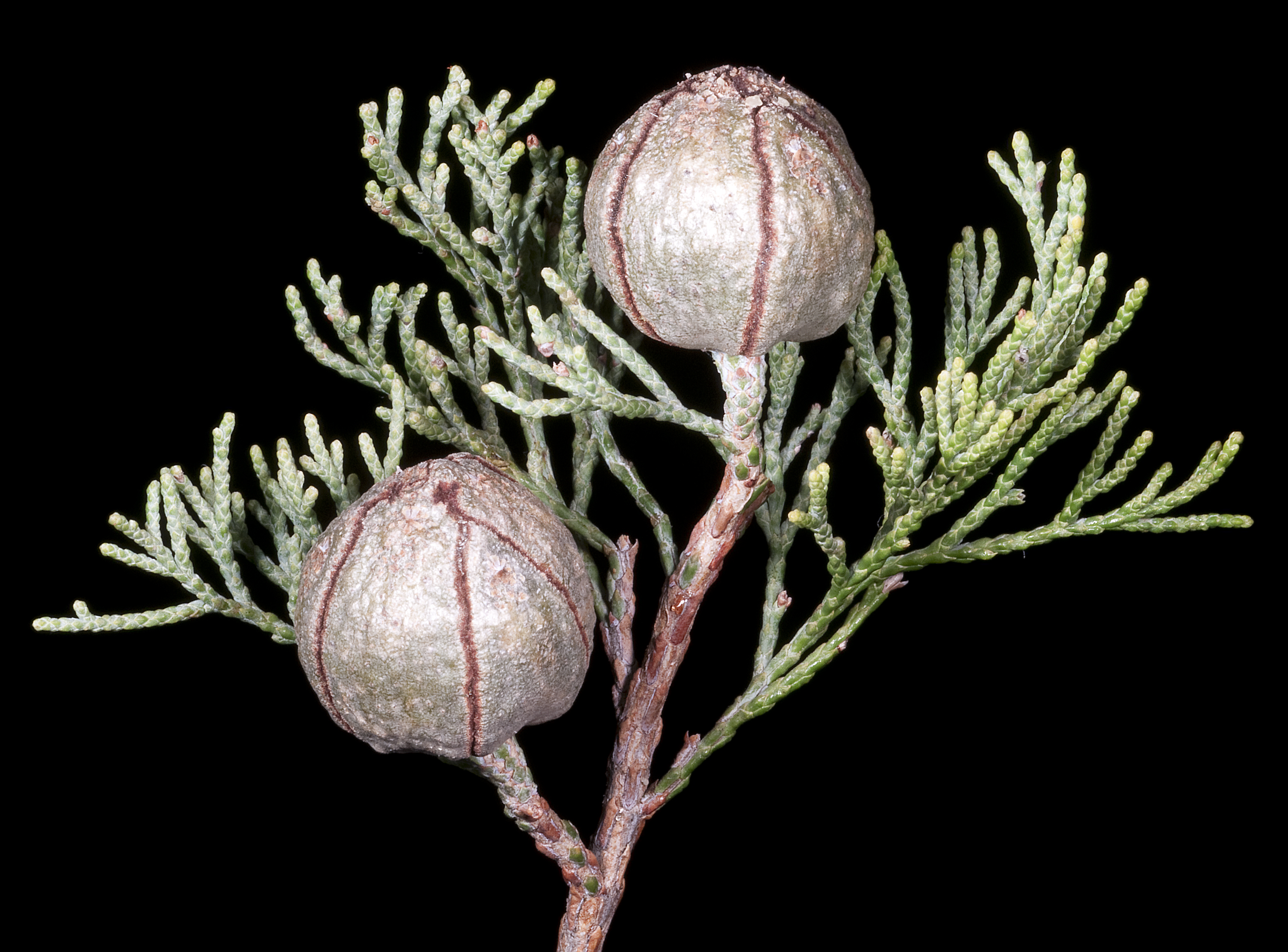

Conservation status
- Least Concern (IUCN 3.1)

Scientific classification
- Kingdom: Plantae
- Clade: Embryophytes
- Clade: Tracheophytes
- Clade: Gymnosperms
- Division: Pinophyta
- Class: Pinopsida
- Order: Cupressales
- Family: Cupressaceae
- Genus: Callitris
- Species: C. canescens

Binomial name
- Callitris canescens (Parl.) S.T.Blake

Synonyms
- Callitris morrisonii R.T.Baker; Frenela canescens Parl.

= Callitris canescens =

Species of plant

Callitris canescens is a species of conifer in the cypress family, Cupressaceae. It is endemic to Australia.
