= Callitris intratropica =

Scientific classification
- Kingdom: Plantae
- Clade: Tracheophytes
- Clade: Gymnosperms
- Division: Pinophyta
- Class: Pinopsida
- Order: Cupressales
- Family: Cupressaceae
- Genus: Callitris
- Species: C. intratropica

Binomial name
- Callitris intratropica R.T.Baker & H.G.Sm.

Synonyms
- Callitris columellaris var. intratropica (R.T.Baker & H.G.Sm.) Silba; Callitris columellaris subsp. intratropica (R.T.Baker & H.G.Sm.) Silba; Callitris columellaris var. microcarpa (Benth.) Govaerts; Callitris robusta var. intratropica (R.T.Baker & H.G.Sm.) Ewart & O.B.Davies; Callitris robusta var. microcarpa (Benth.) F.M.Bailey; Frenela robusta var. microcarpa Benth.

Species of flowering plant

Callitris intratropica is a species of conifer in the family Cupressaceae. It is a tree native to northern Australia, in portions of Western Australia, the Northern Territory, and Queensland.
