= Callitris roei =

Conservation status
- Near Threatened (IUCN 3.1)

Scientific classification
- Kingdom: Plantae
- Clade: Tracheophytes
- Clade: Gymnosperms
- Division: Pinophyta
- Class: Pinopsida
- Order: Cupressales
- Family: Cupressaceae
- Genus: Callitris
- Species: C. roei

Binomial name
- Callitris roei (Endl.) Benth. & Hook.f. ex F.Muell.

Synonyms
- Frenela roei Endl.; Frenela subcordata Parl.

Species of conifer

Callitris roei, Roe's cypress-pine, is a species of conifer in the cypress family, Cupressaceae, native to Australia. It is endemic to southwestern Western Australia from Moora south to Albany and east to Cape Arid National Park.

It is a coniferous shrub or small tree growing to 5 m tall. The leaves are borne in decussate whorls of three, scale-like, 2–5 mm long and 1–1.5 mm broad; leaves on seedlings are longer and needle-like, not scale-like. The seed cones are globose, 1–2 cm diameter, with six scales in two whorls of three; they mature in about 18 months after pollination. The pollen cones are cylindrical, 3–6 mm long and 1.2–2 mm broad.
