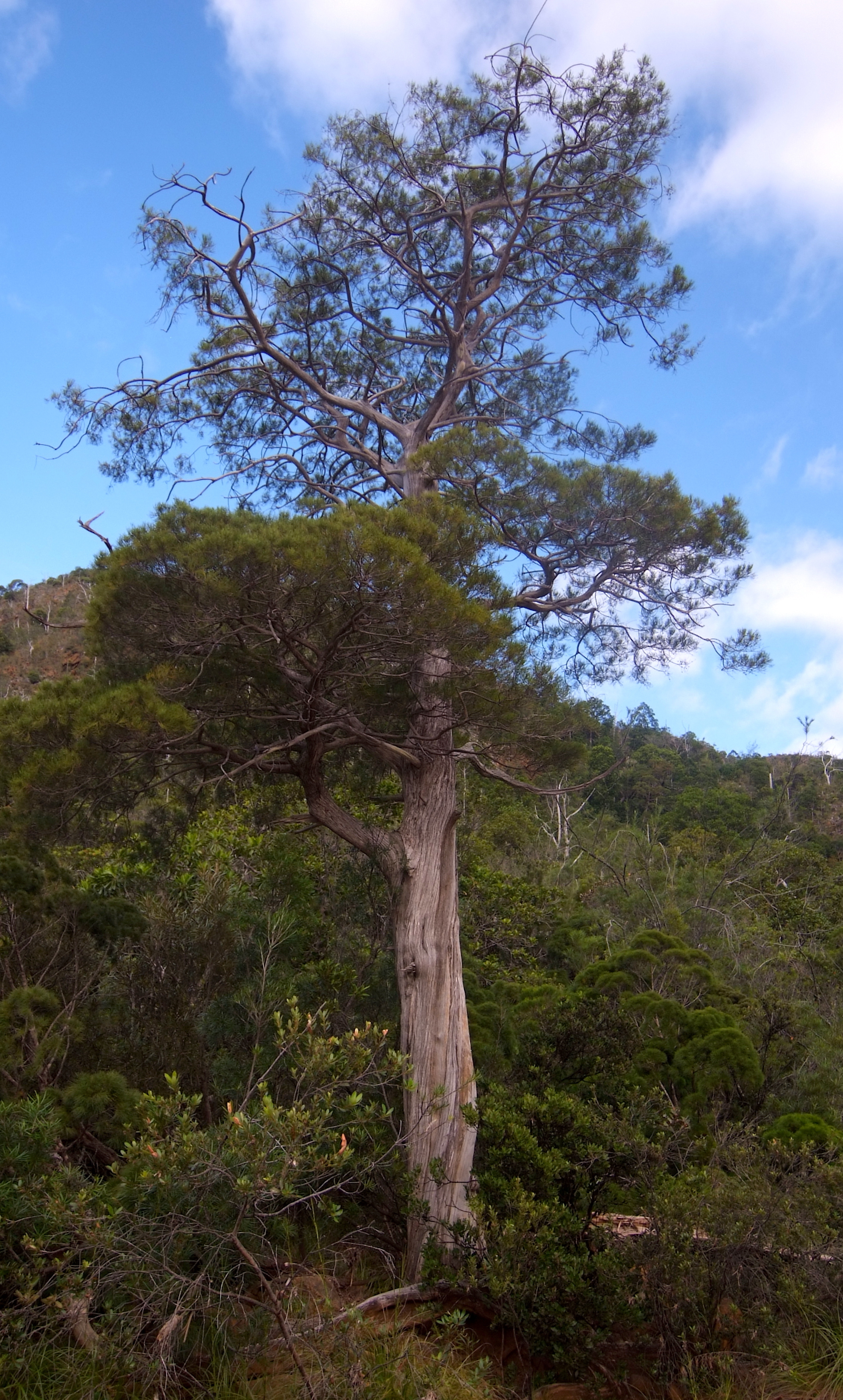

Conservation status
- Endangered (IUCN 3.1)

Scientific classification
- Kingdom: Plantae
- Clade: Tracheophytes
- Clade: Gymnosperms
- Division: Pinophyta
- Class: Pinopsida
- Order: Cupressales
- Family: Cupressaceae
- Genus: Callitris
- Species: C. sulcata

Binomial name
- Callitris sulcata (Parl.) Schltr.

= Callitris sulcata =

Species of conifer

Callitris sulcata is a species of conifer in the cypress family, Cupressaceae. Its common name is Sapin de Comboui. It is endemic to New Caledonia, where it grows only in three forested river valleys. It is an endangered species with a total population of about 10,000 individuals.
