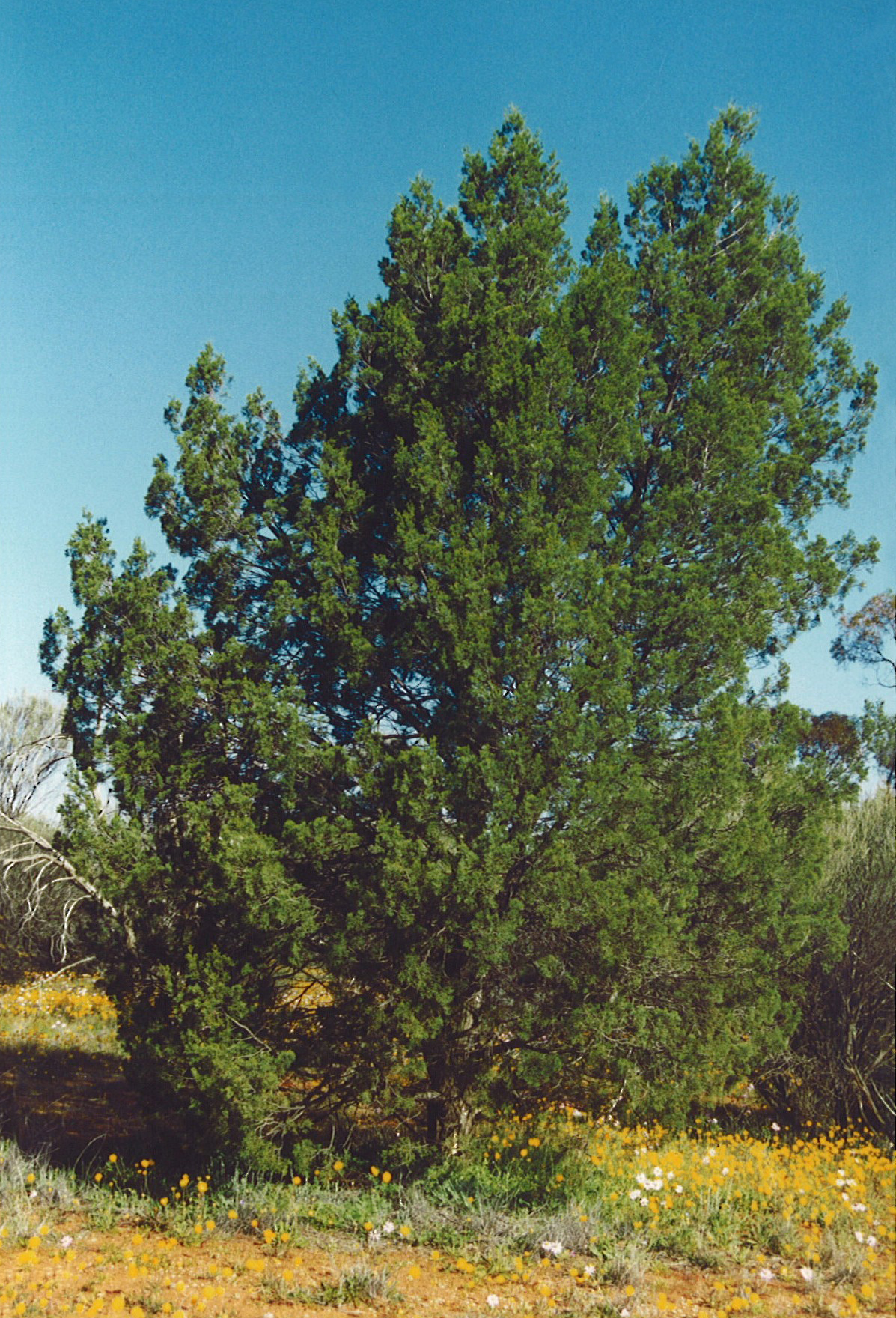
- Callitris glaucophylla

Scientific classification
- Kingdom: Plantae
- Clade: Tracheophytes
- Clade: Gymnosperms
- Division: Pinophyta
- Class: Pinopsida
- Order: Cupressales
- Family: Cupressaceae
- Subfamily: Callitroideae
- Genus: Callitris; Vent.

Type species
- Callitris rhomboidea

Species
- See text

Synonyms
- Actinostrobus Miq.; Callitropsis Compton non Oersted; Cyparissia Hoffmanns.; Frenela Mirb.; Leichhardtia T. Steph. ex Gordon; Neocallitropsis Florin; Nothocallitris A. V. Bobrov & Melikyan; Octoclinis F. Muell.

= Callitris =

Callitris Temporal range: Oligocene–Present

Genus of conifers

Callitris is a genus of coniferous trees in the cypress family, Cupressaceae. There are 22 recognized species in the genus, of which 19 are native to Australia and the other three (C. neocaledonica, C. sulcata and C. pancheri) native to New Caledonia. Traditionally, the most widely used common name is cypress-pine Alongside Eucalyptus and Acacia, Callitris is one of the dominant tree genera in Australia.

== Description ==
They are small to medium-sized trees or large shrubs, reaching 5–25 m (16–82 ft) tall (to 40 m (130 ft) in C. macleayana). The leaves are and scale-like, but young seedlings have needle-like leaves; in C. macleayana, needle-like leaves are found mixed with scale leaves throughout the tree's life. The scales are arranged in six rows along the twigs, in alternating whorls of three (often in whorls of four in C. macleayana).

The male cones are small, 3–6 mm (0.12–0.24 in) long, and are located at the tips of the twigs. The female cones start out similarly inconspicuous, maturing in 18–20 months to 1–3 cm (0.39–1.18 in) long and wide, globular to ovoid (acute in C. macleayana), with six overlapping, thick, woody scales, arranged in two whorls of three (often 8 scales in C. macleayana). The cones remain closed on the trees for many years, opening only after being scorched by a bushfire; this then releases the seeds to grow on the newly cleared burnt ground.

== Taxonomy ==
The genus is divided into two sections, with the atypical C. macleayana in sect. Octoclinis, and all the other species in sect. Callitris. Some botanists treat C. macleayana in a separate genus, as Octoclinis macleayana. C. macleayana is also distinct in occurring in rainforest on the east coast of Australia; the other species all grow on dry sites.

The former genus Actinostrobus is now considered a synonym of Callitris. Actinostrobus included three species of shrubs and small trees endemic to southwest Western Australia characterized by cones having several basal whorls of small sterile scales. A 2010 study of Actinostrobus and Callitris places the three species of Actinostrobus within an expanded Callitris based on analysis of 42 morphological and anatomical characters.

In 2010, early Oligocene fossilised foliage and cones of Callitris were unearthed near the Lea River in Tasmania. The fossils were given the name Callitris leaensis and represent the oldest known representative of the genus.

=== Species ===
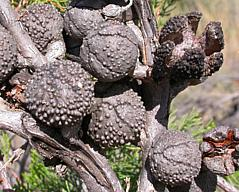
Callitris verrucosa cones

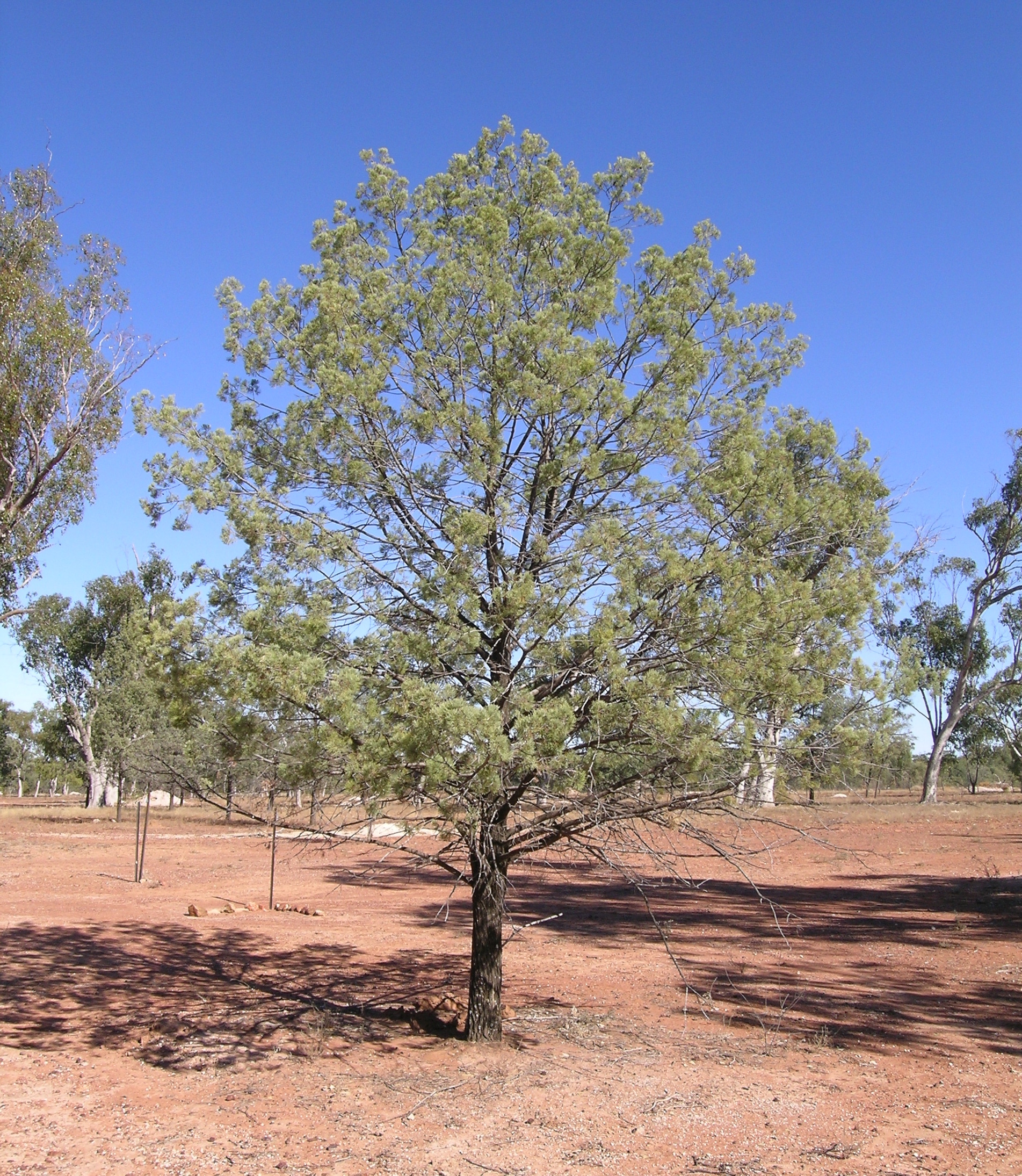
Callitris glaucophylla (white cypress), Lightning Ridge, NSW

Stull et al. 2021

- Callitris s.l.
  - - Neocallitropsis
      - C. neocaledonica Dümmer
      - - C. sulcata (Parlatore) Schlechter (Sapin de Comboui)
        - C. pancheri (Carrière) Byng
  - - C. macleayana Sheph. ex von Mueller (Stringybark pine)
    - - - Actinostrobus
          - C. acuminata (Parl.) Muell. (Dwarf cypress)
          - - C. arenaria (C.A.Gardner) J.E.Piggin & J.J.Bruhl (Sandplain cypress)
            - C. pyramidalis (Miq.) J.E.Piggin & J.J.Bruhl (Swan river cypress)
        - - C. roei (Endlicher) Bentham & Hooker ex von Mueller (Roe's cypress pine)
          - - C. drummondii (Parlatore) Bentham & Hooker ex von Mueller (Drummond's/small cypress pine)
            - - C. baileyi White (Bailey´s cypress pine)
              - C. columellaris von Mueller (White/Northern/Murray River cypress pine)
      - - Callitris s.s.
          - C. monticola Garden (Steelhead dwarf cypress)
          - - - C. canescens (Parlatore) Blake (Morrison´s cypress pine)
              - C. oblonga Richard (Tasmanian cypress/South Esk/pygmy pine)
            - - C. muelleri (Parlatore) Bentham & Hooker ex von Mueller (Illawarra cypress pine)
              - - C. endlicheri (Parlatore) Bailey (Black cypress pine)
                - - - C. preissii Miquel (Rottnest Island pine, Southern/slender cypress pine)
                    - C. verrucosa (Cunningham ex Endlicher) Brown ex de Mirbel (Mallee cypress pine)
                  - - - C. intratropica Baker & H.G.Sm.
                      - C. rhomboidea Brown ex Richard (Port Jackson/Oyster Bay/Illawarra Mountain pine)
                    - - C. glaucophylla J.Thomps. & Johnson
                      - - C. gracilis Baker
                        - C. tuberculata (de Mirbel) Brown ex Endlicher

The genus includes the following species:

- Callitris acuminata (Parl.) F.Muell. – Southwest Australia
- Callitris arenaria (C.A.Gardner) J.E.Piggin & J.J.Bruhl – Southwest Australia
- Callitris baileyi C.T.White – SE Qld, NE NSW
- Callitris canescens (Parl.) S.T.Blake – S WA, S SA
- Callitris columellaris F.Muell. – south-east Qld (coastal); naturalised in Hawaii and southern Florida. Previously synonymous with C. glaucophylla, C. endlicheri and C. intratropica.
- Callitris drummondii (Parl.) Benth. & Hook.f. ex F.Muell. – S WA
- Callitris endlicheri (Parl.) F.M.Bailey – NSW, Qld, Vic (hilly areas); naturalised in Hawaii and St Helena
- Callitris glaucophylla J.Thomps. & L.A.S.Johnson - NSW, Qld, SA, NT, WA (most common)
- Callitris gracilis R.T.Baker - SA, Vic, NSW
- Callitris intratropica R.T.Baker & H.G.Sm. - NT (blue cypress)
- Callitris macleayana (F.Muell.) F.Muell. – Qld, NSW
- Callitris monticola J.Garden – Qld, NSW
- Callitris muelleri (Parl.) Benth. & Hook.f. ex F.Muell. – NSW
- Callitris neocaledonica Dümmer – New Caledonia
- Callitris oblonga Rich. – NSW, Tas
- Callitris pancheri (Carrière) Byng – New Caledonia
- Callitris preissii Miq. – SA, Vic, WA, NSW
- Callitris pyramidalis (Miq.) J.E.Piggin & J.J.Bruhl – Southwest Australia
- Callitris rhomboidea R.Br. ex Rich. – NSW, Qld, Vic, Tas, naturalised on New Zealand's North Island
- Callitris roei (Endl.) Benth. & Hook.f. ex F.Muell. – S WA
- Callitris sulcata (Parl.) Schltr. – New Caledonia
- Callitris verrucosa (A.Cunn. ex Endl.) F.Muell. – SA, Vic, WA, NSW, Qld

=== Doubtful names ===
The following names are of doubtful validity:

- Callitris arenosa Sweet, nom. inval., nom. nud., type not cited, identity uncertain.
- Callitris columellaris f. glauca F.M.Bailey, described from Qld, type not located, identity uncertain (Hill, 1998).
- Callitris conglobata Heynh., nom. inval., nom. nud, described from New Holland, type not located, identity uncertain.
- Callitris elegans Heynh. (or Sieber ex Heynh.), nom. inval., nom. nud, described from "New Holland", type not located, identity uncertain.
- Callitris intermedia' R.T.Baker & H.G.Sm., nom. inval., identity uncertain (Hill, 1998).
- Callitris montana Heynh., nom. inval., nom. nud, described from New Holland, type not located, identity uncertain.
- Callitris pyramidalis Sweet, nom. inval., nom. nud, syn. Frenela pyramidalis (Sweet) Parl., nom. inval., nom. nud, type not cited, identity uncertain.
- Callitris macrocarpa Vent., nom. inval. nom. nud, syn Cupressus macrocarpa (Vent.) A.Cunn., nom. inval., identity uncertain.

== Human use ==
The wood of cypress-pines is light, soft and aromatic. It can be easily split and resists decay; cypress-pine is also termite resistant. It is used to make furniture, indoor and outdoor paneling, and fence posts. Cypress-pines are occasionally planted as ornamental trees, but their use is restricted by the high risks imposed by their very high flammability in bushfires.

Previously a plantation of C. intratropica was established outside of Darwin for use in house construction. After Cyclone Tracy it was realised that the timber did not resist strong winds and the plantation was abandoned. The trees are now used for the production of a blue essential oil, rich in guaiol and chamazulene (the blue compound). A number of therapeutic effects are attributed to the essential oil, including antimicrobial and anti-inflammatory effects.
