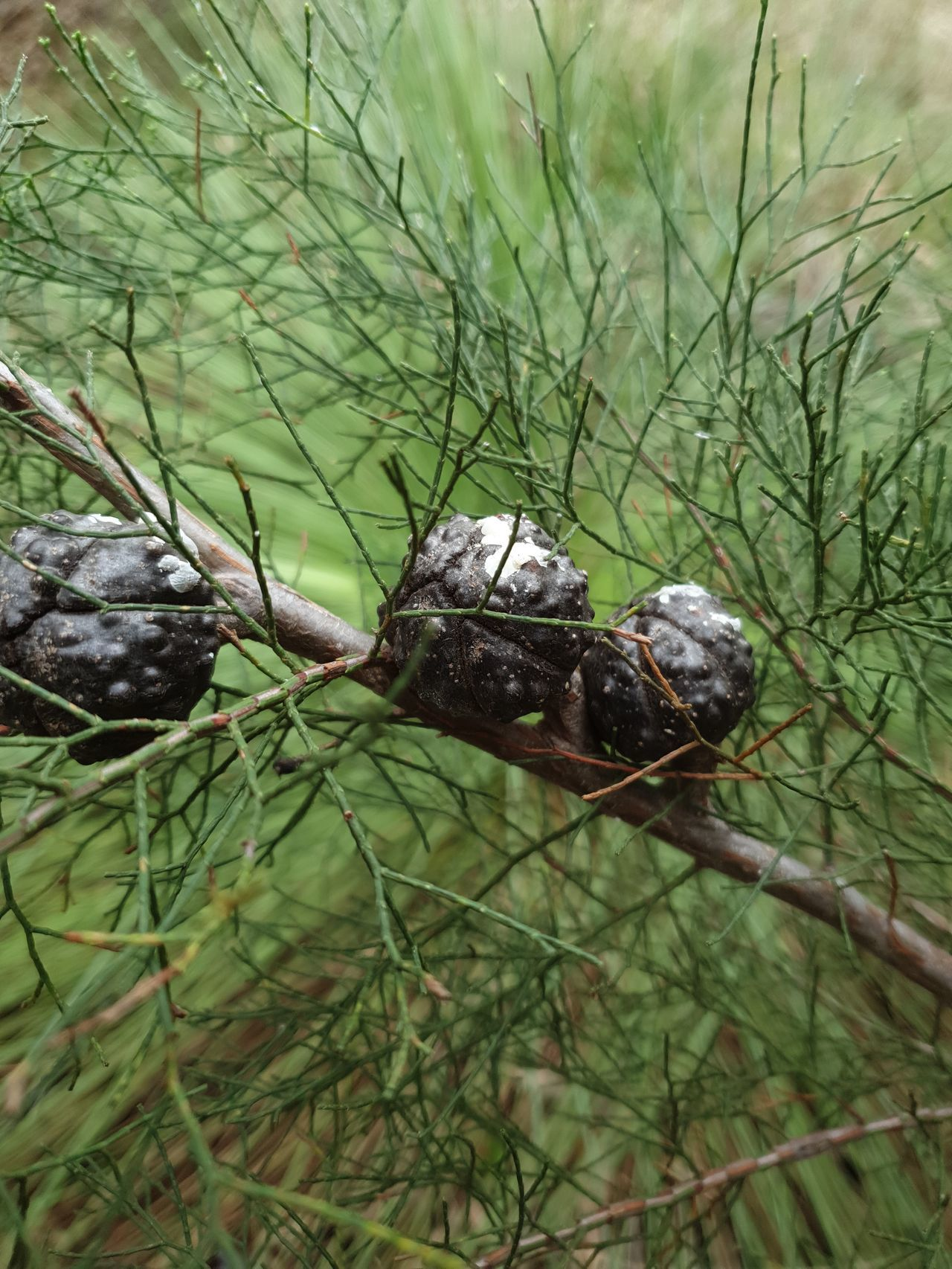
- Foliage and cones, Trigg Bushland Reserve, Perth, Western Australia

Conservation status
- Least Concern (IUCN 3.1)

Scientific classification
- Kingdom: Plantae
- Clade: Tracheophytes
- Clade: Gymnosperms
- Division: Pinophyta
- Class: Pinopsida
- Order: Cupressales
- Family: Cupressaceae
- Genus: Callitris
- Species: C. preissii

Binomial name
- Callitris preissii Miq.

Synonyms
- Callitris glauca R.Br. ex R.T.Baker & H.G.Sm., nom. illeg. superfl.; Callitris robusta (A.Cunn. ex Endl.) F.M.Bailey, nom. superfl.; Callitris suissii Preiss ex R.T.Baker & H.G.Sm.; Callitris tuberculata R.Br. ex R.T.Baker & H.G.Sm.; Frenela robusta A.Cunn. ex Endl., nom. illeg. superfl.

= Callitris preissii =

Species of plant

Callitris preissii is a species of conifer in the cypress family, Cupressaceae. It a tree native to southern Australia, ranging from Western Australia to South Australia, Victoria, and New South Wales. Common names include Rottnest Island pine, Murray pine, maroong, southern cypress pine, and slender cypress pine. The Noongar peoples call the tree marro.

== Description ==
It can have a tree or shrub-like habit, typically growing to a height of 1 to 9 metres (3 to 30 ft) and a width of up to 6 m (20 ft). It is relatively slow growing. The crown is made up fine, dense foliage. The leaf is rounded on the dorsal side and the cones often have a width of over 2 cm (0.8 in) with scales that do not separate from the base. It starts producing brown-yellow-orange cones between October and January. The root system is generally moderate to deep or shallow and spreading. It is reasonably long lived, usually to over 15 years of age.

== Distribution ==
In Western Australia it is native to the Swan Coastal Plain, Rottnest Island, and Garden Island but has become naturalised elsewhere and now has a scattered distribution throughout the Mid West, Wheatbelt, Peel, Great Southern and Goldfields-Esperance regions where it is found on plains, slopes, the margins of salt lakes and among granite outcrops growing in sandy, loamy or clay soils.

== Uses ==
The plant makes a good windbreak or functions as a shelterbelt or shade for stock. The trunks make ideal fence posts and it has good ornamental attributes. The plant's pollen has value for apiculture. In urban areas it makes a good ornamental plant, or a free street tree, and is suitable as a screen or hedge.
