= Koreelah National Park =

National park in New South Wales, Australia

- IUCN category II (national park)
- Location within New South Wales
- Location: New South Wales
- Coordinates: 28°18′19″S 152°26′20″E
- Area: 53 km^{2} (20 sq mi)
- Established: 1999
- Governing body: NSW National Parks & Wildlife Service
- Website: Official website

Koreelah is a national park in New South Wales, Australia, 631 km north of Sydney. The park is part of the Scenic Rim Important Bird Area, identified as such by BirdLife International because of its importance in the conservation of several species of threatened birds.

== Description ==
The main feature is the gorge just south west of the campsite. At the head of the gorge is a deep water hole surrounded by four metre cliffs that can be dived from. There are bigger waterfalls downstream but no access to the main gorge from the north without ropes. There is some algae in the water if there has not been recent rain.

This is a wonderful place to relax and enjoy nature, and the company will make you platypus, koalas, sugar gliders, brush-tailed rock wallabies and glossy black cockatoos.

== Facilities ==
There is a campsite signed west of White Swamp Road, roughly 10 km north of Old Koreelah (which is on the Mount Lindsay Highway). It has a compost toilet and some barbecues, although the grass and weeds are rather long since cattle were evicted about 1999.

== See also ==
- Protected areas of New South Wales
