= Hybridization in pines =

Pine (Pinus) species can hybridize, combining their genetic material and sometimes creating hybrids that can be more or less vigorous than their parent species. Examples of naturally occurring hybrid pine species are Pinus × rhaetica, a hybrid of mountain pine and Scots pine (Pinus sylvestris); and Pinus × sondereggeri, a hybrid between loblolly pine (P. taeda) and longleaf pine (P. palustris). Many artificial hybrids are given below.

== Subgenus Pinus ==
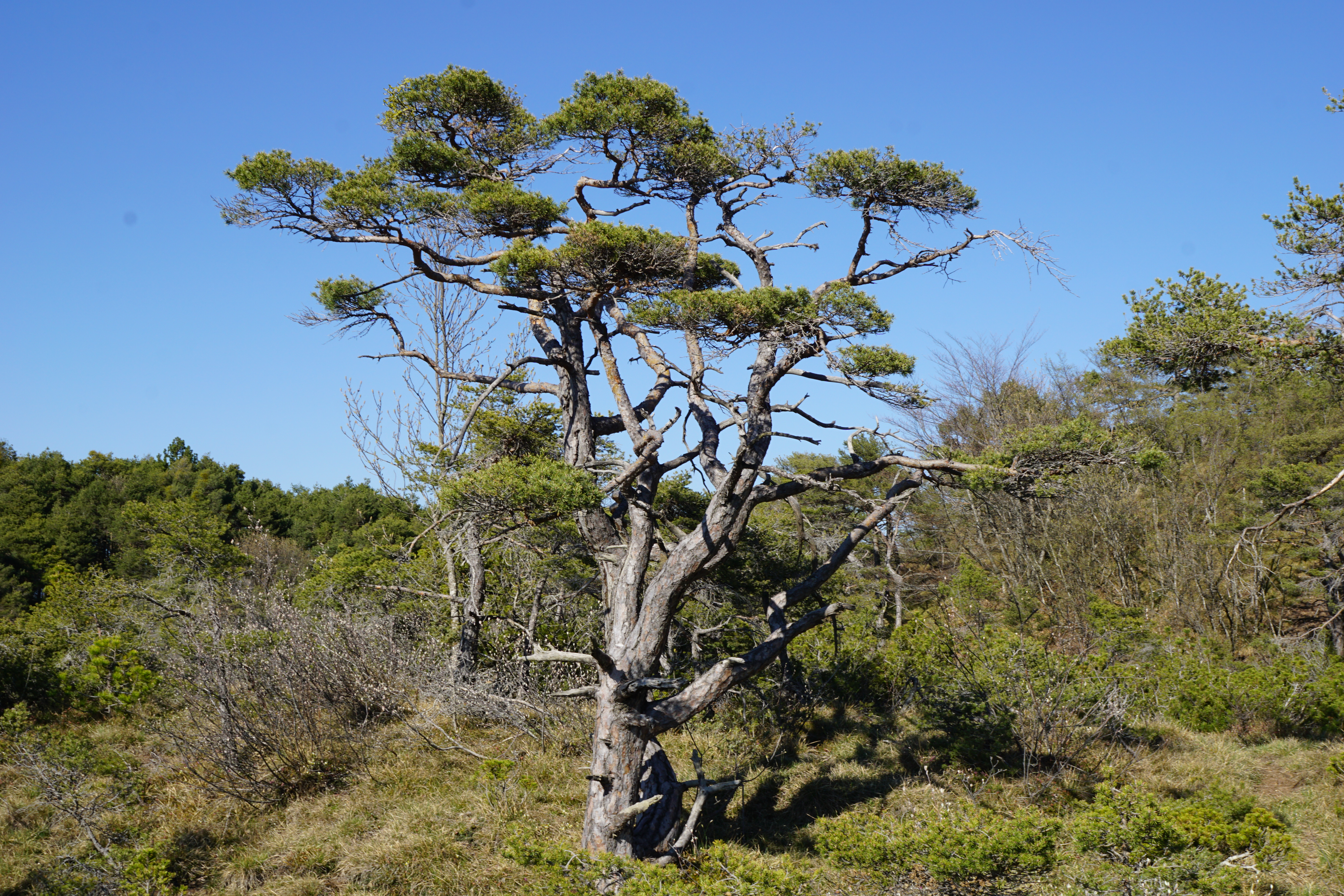
Pinus × rhaetica in Trentino, Italy

Includes both natural and artificial pine hybrids.

=== Subsection Pinus ===
- Pinus × rhaetica, Pinus mugo × P. sylvestris – Rhaetic pine (Mountain pine × Scots pine) (natural)
- Pinus × neilreichiana, Pinus nigra × P. sylvestris – Neilreich's pine (European black pine × Scots pine) (natural)
- Pinus × funebris, Pinus densiflora × P. sylvestris – Japanese red pine × Scots pine (natural)
- Pinus × densithunbergii, Pinus densiflora × P. thunbergii – Japanese red pine × Japanese black pine (natural)
- Pinus densiflora × P. nigra – Japanese red pine × European black pine (artificial)
- Pinus nigra × P. resinosa – European black pine × red pine (artificial)

=== Subsection Pinaster ===
- Pinus × galaiana, Pinus brutia × P. halepensis – Turkish pine × Aleppo pine (natural)
- Pinus × saportae, Pinus halepensis × P. pinaster – Aleppo pine × maritime pine (natural)

=== Subsection Ponderosae ===
- Pinus ponderosa subsp. ponderosa × P. arizonica – ponderosa pine (typical variety) × Arizona pine (artificial)
- Pinus ponderosa subsp. ponderosa × P. montezumae – ponderosa pine (typical variety) × Montezuma pine (artificial)
- Pinus ponderosa subsp. scopulorum × P. montezumae – Rocky Mountain ponderosa pine × Montezuma pine (artificial)
- Pinus engelmannii × P. montezumae – Apache pine × Montezuma pine (artificial)
- Pinus ponderosa subsp. ponderosa × P. engelmannii – ponderosa pine (typical variety) × Apache pine (artificial)
- Pinus engelmannii × P. arizonica – Apache pine × Arizona pine (artificial)
- Pinus engelmannii × P. ponderosa subsp. scopulorum – Apache pine × Rocky Mountain ponderosa pine (artificial)
- Pinus jeffreyi × P. montezumae – Jeffrey pine × Montezuma pine (artificial)
- Pinus jeffreyi × P. ponderosa subsp. ponderosa – Jeffrey pine × ponderosa pine (typical variety) (artificial)
- Pinus jeffreyi × P. ponderosa subsp. scopulorum – Jeffrey pine × Rocky Mountain ponderosa pine (artificial)
- Pinus jeffreyi × P. coulteri – Jeffrey pine × Coulter pine (artificial)

=== Subsection Contortae ===
- Pinus × murraybanksiana, Pinus contorta subsp. latifolia × P. banksiana – Rocky Mountain lodgepole pine × jack pine (natural)
- Pinus virginiana × P. clausa – Virginia pine × sand pine (artificial)

=== Subsection Australes ===
- Pinus × sondereggeri, Pinus palustris × P. taeda – Sonderegger's pine (Longleaf pine × loblolly pine) (natural)
- Pinus × attenuradiata, Pinus attenuata × P. radiata – knobcone pine × Monterey pine (natural)
- Pinus rigida × P. serotina – pitch pine × pond pine (natural)
- Pinus elliottii × P. palustris – slash pine × longleaf pine (artificial)
- Pinus elliottii × P. taeda – slash pine × loblolly pine (artificial)
- Pinus echinata × P. elliottii – shortleaf pine × slash pine (artificial)
- Pinus echinata × P. taeda – shortleaf pine × loblolly pine (artificial)
- Pinus pungens × P. echinata – table mountain pine × shortleaf pine (artificial)
- Pinus rigida × P. echinata – pitch pine × shortleaf pine (artificial)
- Pinus × rigitaeda, Pinus rigida × P. taeda – pitlolly pine (pitch pine × loblolly pine) (artificial)
- Pinus patula × P. greggii – Mexican weeping pine × Gregg's pine (artificial)
- Pinus patula × P. radiata – Mexican weeping pine × Monterey pine (artificial)
- Pinus attenuata × P. muricata – Knobcone pine × Bishop pine (artificial)

== Subgenus Strobus ==
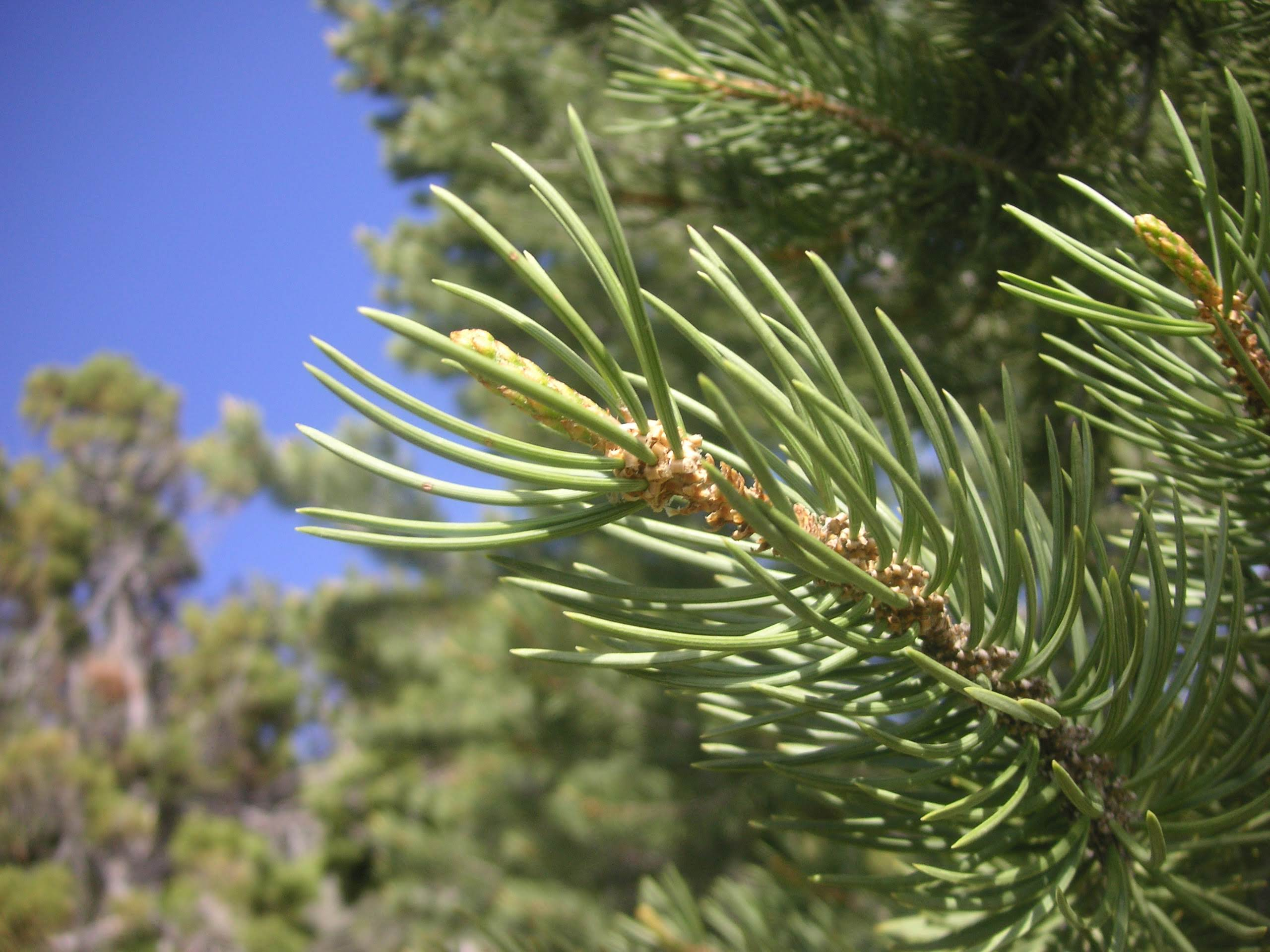
Pinus monophylla × P. edulis foliage

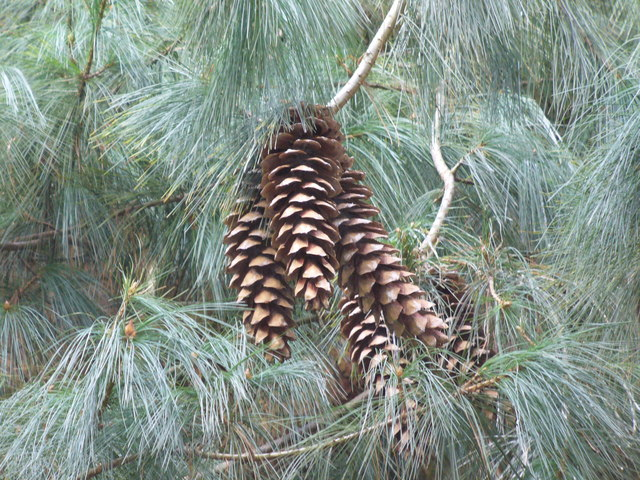
Pinus × holfordiana with its 30 cm cones

Includes both natural and artificial pine hybrids. There have been external reports of pine hybrids in the subgenus Strobus.

=== Subsection Cembroides ===
- Pinus × kohae, Pinus californiarum (disputed species) × P. edulis – California single-leaf pinyon × Colorado pinyon (natural)
- Pinus quadrifolia × P. californiarum – Parry's pinyon × California single-leaf pinyon
- Pinus monophylla × P. edulis – single-leaf pinyon × Colorado pinyon (natural)
- Pinus quadrifolia × P. monophylla – Parry's pinyon × single-leaf pinyon (artificial)

=== Subsection Strobus ===
- Pinus pumila × P. sibirica – Japanese stone pine × Siberian pine (natural)

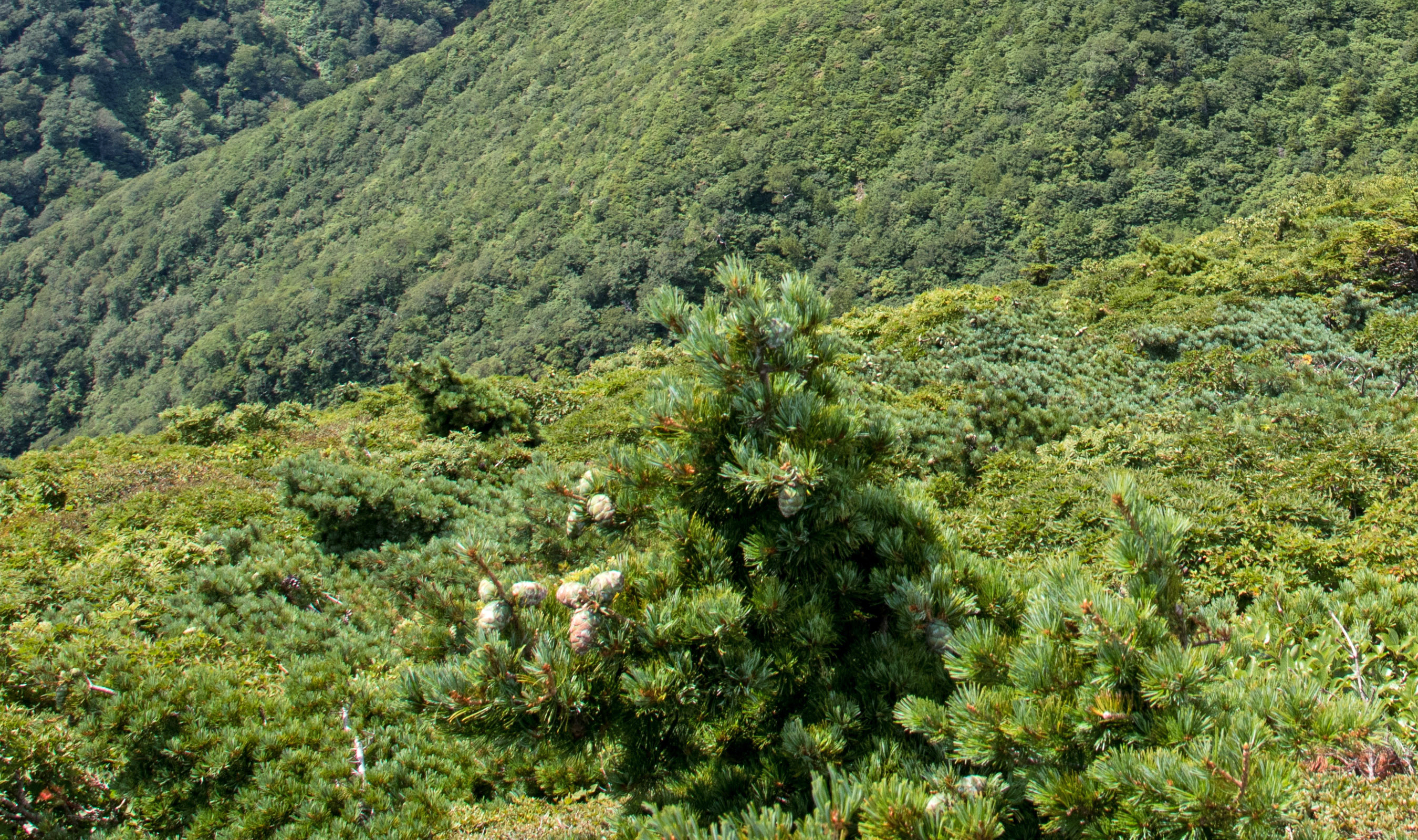
Pinus × hakkodensis

- Pinus × hakkodensis, Pinus parviflora × P. pumila – Hakkoda pine (Japanese white pine × Japanese stone pine) (natural)
- Pinus × holfordiana, Pinus veitchii × P. wallichiana – Holford's pine (Veitch's white pine × blue pine) (artificial)
- Pinus × hunnewellii, Pinus parviflora × P. strobus – Hunnewell's white pine (Japanese white pine × eastern white pine) (artificial)
- Pinus monticola × P. parviflora – western white pine × Japanese white pine (artificial)
- Pinus lambertiana × P. armandii – sugar pine × Chinese white pine (artificial)
- Pinus lambertiana × P. koraiensis – sugar pine × Korean pine (artificial)
- Pinus monticola × P. strobiformis – western white pine × southwestern white pine (artificial)
- Pinus monticola × P. flexilis – western white pine × limber pine (artificial)
- Pinus monticola × P. strobus – western white pine × eastern white pine (artificial)

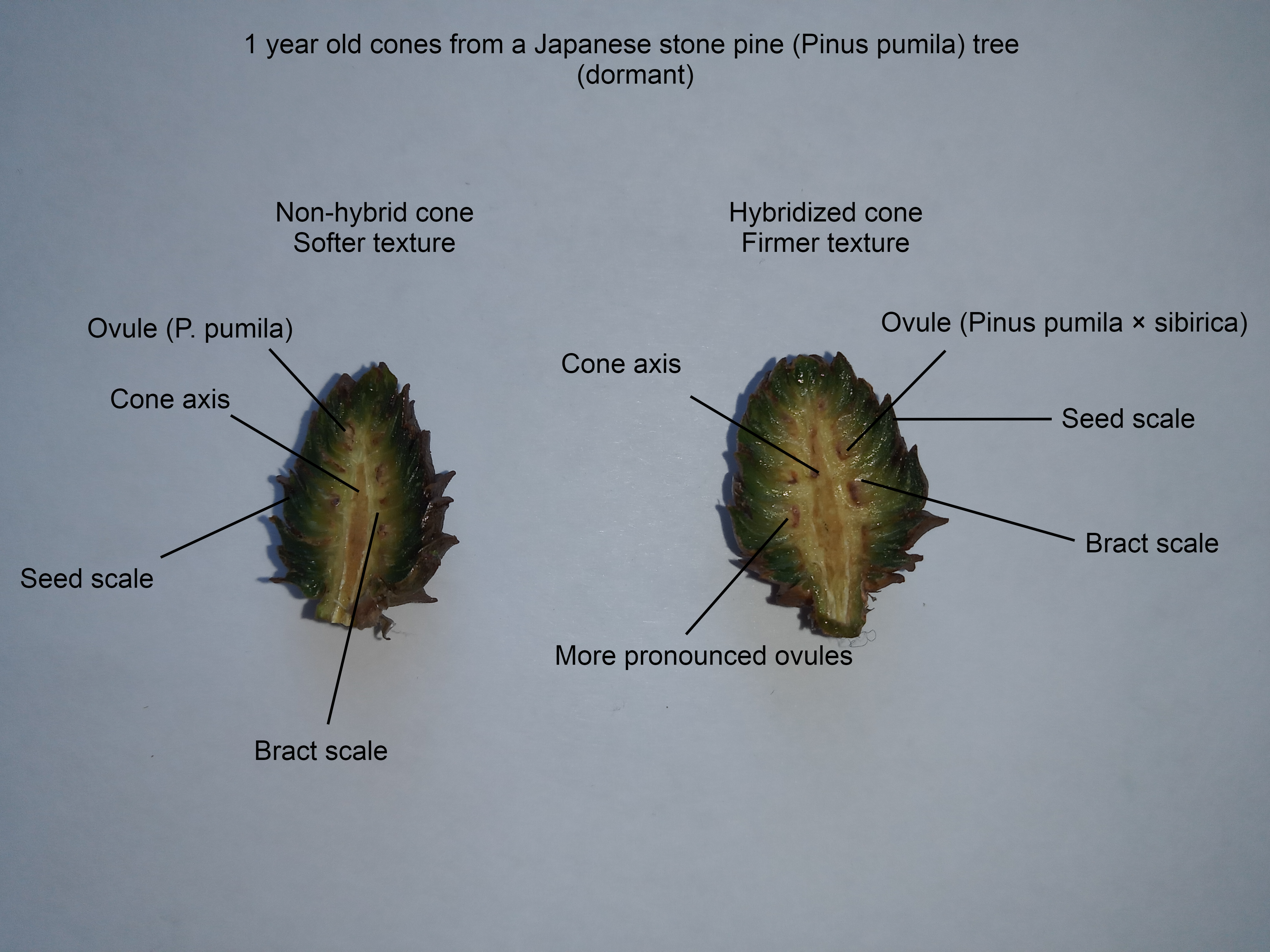
Japanese stone pine cone (Pinus pumila, left) and Japanese stone pine × Siberian pine cone (Pinus pumila × P. sibirica, right). Anatomy of the cones and visible morphological differences in the hybridized cone

- Pinus monticola × P. peuce – western white pine × Macedonian pine (artificial)
- Pinus peuce × P. strobus – Macedonian pine × eastern white pine (artificial)
- Pinus peuce × P. parviflora – Macedonian pine × Japanese white pine (artificial)
- Pinus flexilis × P. wallichiana – limber pine × blue pine (artificial)
- Pinus flexilis × P. strobus – Limber pine × eastern white pine (artificial)
- Pinus flexilis × P. ayacahuite – limber pine × Mexican white pine (artificial)
- Pinus ayacahuite × P. strobus – Mexican white pine × eastern white pine (artificial)
- Pinus × schwerinii, Pinus strobus × P. wallichiana – Schwerin's white pine (eastern white pine × blue pine) (artificial)
- Pinus monticola × P. wallichiana – western white pine × blue pine (artificial)
- Pinus cembra × P. sibirica – Swiss stone pine × Siberian pine (artificial)
- Pinus cembra × P. albicaulis – Swiss stone pine × whitebark pine (artificial)
- Pinus albicaulis × P. flexilis – whitebark pine × limber pine (artificial)
- Pinus sibirica × P. cembra – Siberian pine × Swiss stone pine (artificial)
- Pinus sibirica × P. koraiensis – Siberian pine × Korean pine (artificial)
- Pinus armandii × P. koraiensis – Chinese white pine × Korean pine (artificial)
- Pinus strobus × P. ayacahuite – Eastern white pine × Mexican white pine (artificial)
