= Pinostilbene =

Names
- Preferred IUPAC name 3-[(E)-2-(4-Hydroxyphenyl)ethen-1-yl]-5-methoxyphenol
- Other names Rapontigentin; 3-methoxyresveratrol trans-Pinostilbene; 3,4′-dihydroxy-5-methoxystilbene

Identifiers
CAS Number	42438-89-1; 871504-87-9 (non-specific)
3D model (JSmol)	Interactive image
ChEBI	CHEBI:63672
ChemSpider	4582840
ECHA InfoCard	100.223.039
KEGG	C20154
PubChem CID	5473050
UNII	4PAK325BEM
CompTox Dashboard (EPA)	DTXSID50420234
- InChI: InChI=1S/C15H14O3/c1-18-15-9-12(8-14(17)10-15)3-2-11-4-6-13(16)7-5-11/h2-10,16-17H,1H3/b3-2+ Key: KUWZXOMQXYWKBS-NSCUHMNNSA-N; InChI=1/C15H14O3/c1-18-15-9-12(8-14(17)10-15)3-2-11-4-6-13(16)7-5-11/h2-10,16-17H,1H3/b3-2+ Key: KUWZXOMQXYWKBS-NSCUHMNNBC
- SMILES: COC1=CC(=CC(=C1)O)/C=C/C2=CC=C(C=C2)O

Properties
Chemical formula	C_{15}H_{14}O_{3}
Molar mass	242.27 g/mol
- Except where otherwise noted, data are given for materials in their standard state (at 25 °C [77 °F], 100 kPa). Infobox references

Pinostilbene is a stilbenoid found in Gnetum venosum and in the bark of Pinus sibirica.
