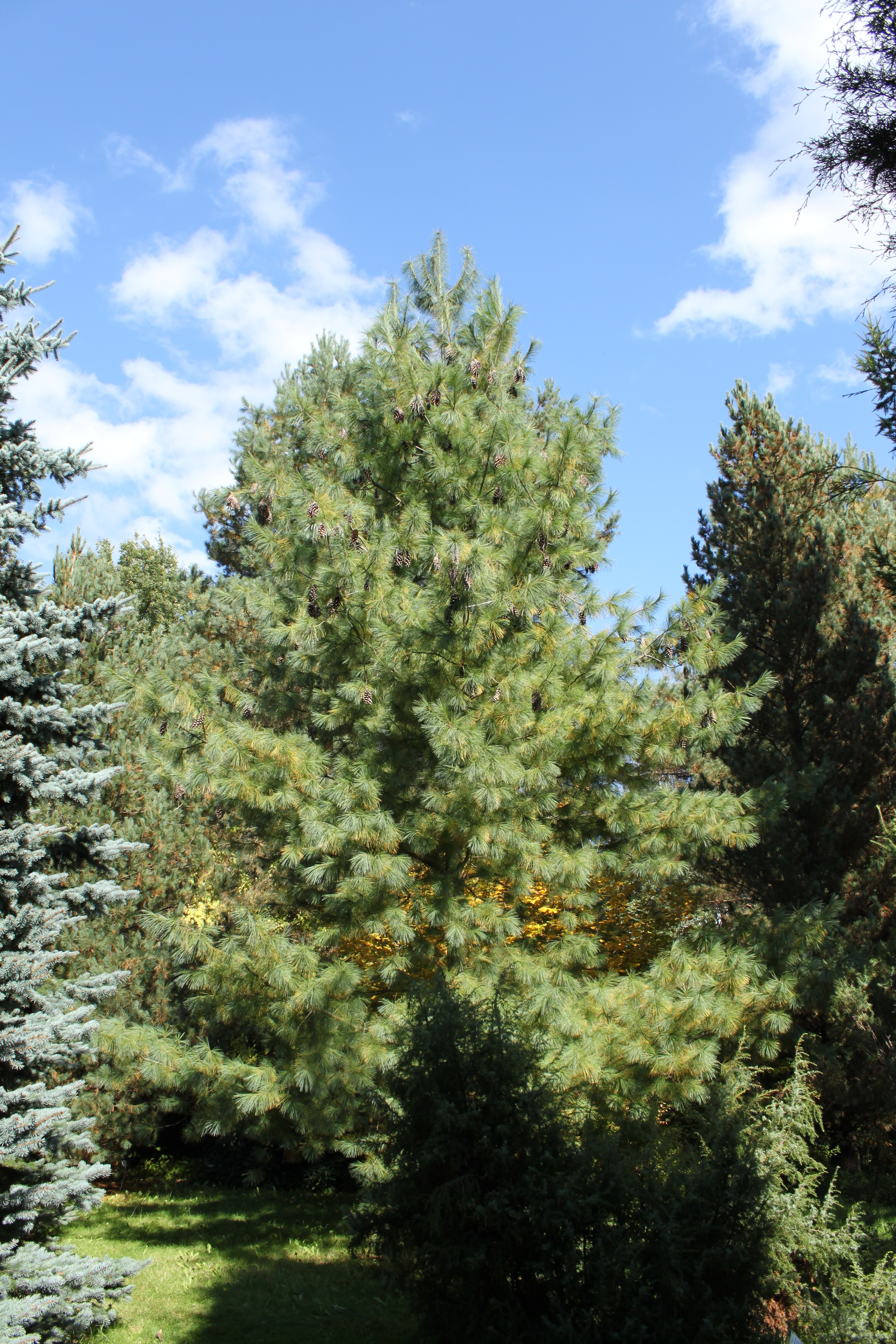

Scientific classification
- Kingdom: Plantae
- Clade: Tracheophytes
- Clade: Gymnosperms
- Division: Pinophyta
- Class: Pinopsida
- Order: Pinales
- Family: Pinaceae
- Genus: Pinus
- Subgenus: P. subg. Strobus
- Section: P. sect. Quinquefoliae
- Subsection: P. subsect. Strobus
- Species: P. × schwerinii

Binomial name
- Pinus × schwerinii Fitschen

= Pinus × schwerinii =

Hybrid species of pine

Pinus × schwerinii, commonly known as the Schwerin pine or Schwerin's pine, is a hybrid pine species between Pinus wallichiana and Pinus strobus. It was first described by German botanist Jost Fitschen in 1930 in Ludwig Beissner's third edition of Handbuch der Nadelholzkunde. P. × schwerinii is named for Fritz Kurt Alexander von Schwerin, who owned the estate near Berlin where the hybrid was first observed growing in proximity to its parent species.

== Description ==
Open cone and seeds of Pinus × schwerinii

Pinus × schwerinii is an evergreen tree with a broadly conical crown. Needles are contained in bundles of 5, which resembles most species of white pine. The needles are approximately 8–12 cm (3.1–4.7 in) long, which is longer than P. strobus, and shorter than P. wallichiana. Twigs are similar to those of P. wallichiana in color, being green to greenish brown. The bark has a smooth texture and light gray color for extended periods of time. Seeds measure approximately 7–9 mm (0.28–0.35 in) long with a 20–25 mm (0.79–0.98 in) long paper wing, comparable to seed dimensions of the higher end of P. strobus and the lower end of P. wallichiana, with overlap. Seed cones consist of ~60 seed scales, measuring 10–20 cm (4–8 in) long and 6 cm (2.4 in) wide, significantly larger than the cones of P. strobus and smaller for P. wallichiana. Seed cones are connected by a 2–4 cm (0.8–1.6 in) long peduncle, and scales open wider than those of both parent species.

== Cultivars ==
Several cultivars of Pinus × schwerinii exist which are often chosen as ornamental plants for distinctive growth habits. The 'Wiethorst' cultivar is one notable example, being a dwarf selection of P. × schwerinii and originating from a witch's broom discovered by Johann Wieting.

== See also ==
- Hybridization in pines
