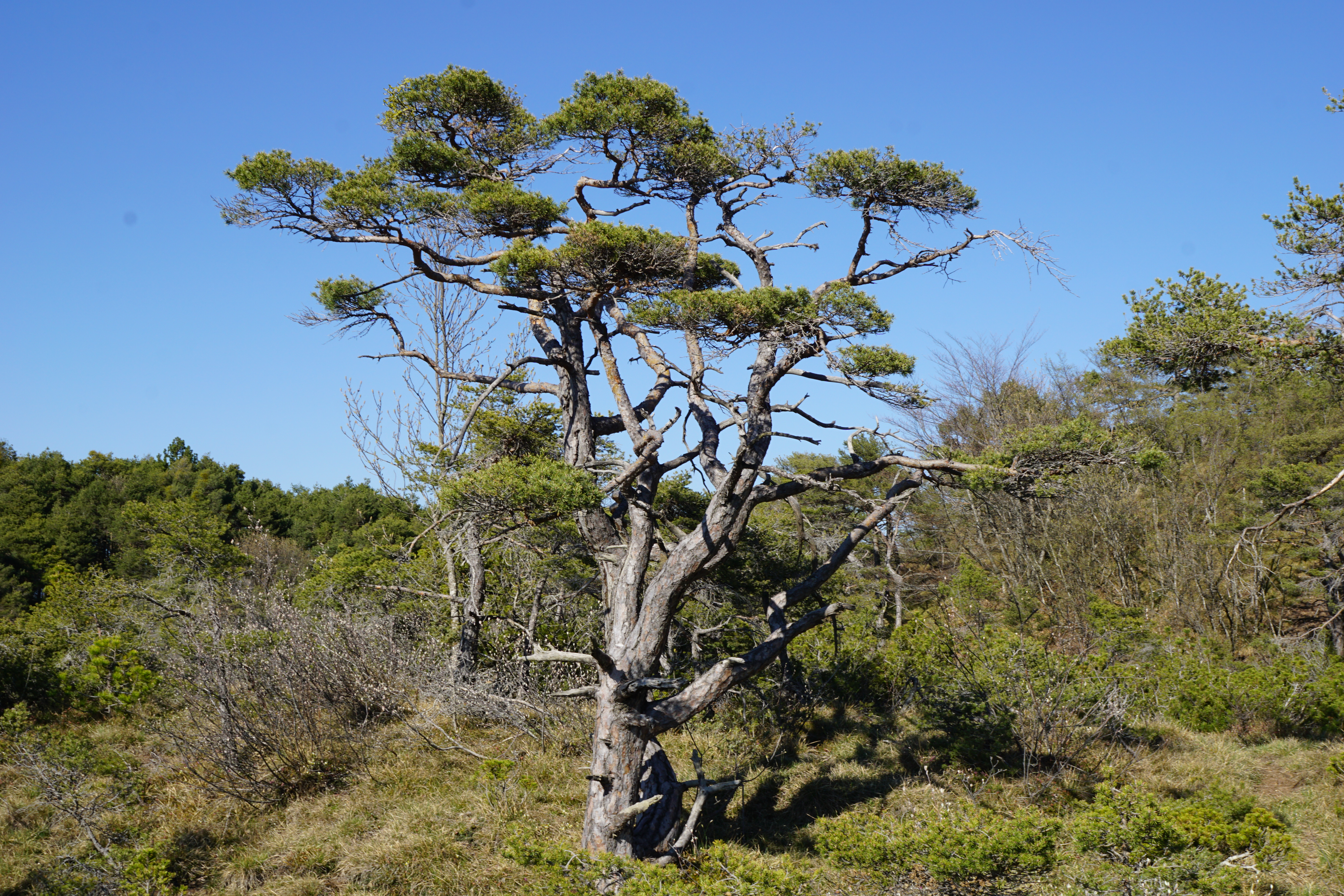
- Old specimen in Trentino, Italy

Conservation status
- Least Concern (IUCN 3.1)

Scientific classification
- Kingdom: Plantae
- Clade: Tracheophytes
- Clade: Gymnosperms
- Division: Pinophyta
- Class: Pinopsida
- Order: Pinales
- Family: Pinaceae
- Genus: Pinus
- Subgenus: P. subg. Pinus
- Section: P. sect. Pinus
- Subsection: P. subsect. Pinus
- Species: P. × rhaetica

Binomial name
- Pinus × rhaetica Brügger
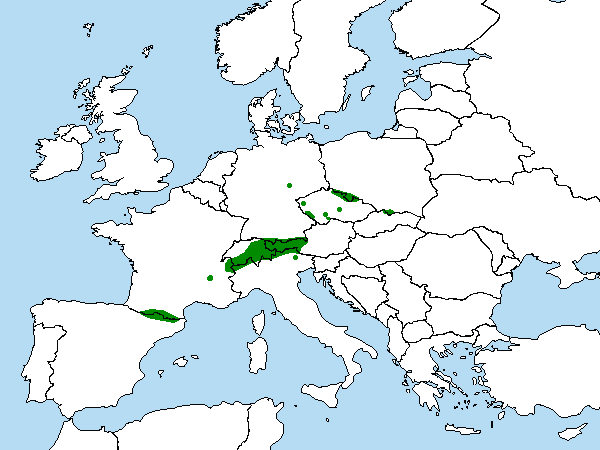
- Distribution map

Synonyms
- Pinus × rhaetica nothosubsp. rhaetica; Pinus × celakovskiorum Ascherson & Graebner; Pinus × christii (Brügger) Seiler; Pinus × heerii (Brügger) Seiler; Pinus × rhaetica nothovar. bolosii Rivas Mart., M.J.Costa & P.Soriano; Pinus × rhaetica nothovar. borgiae Rivas Mart., M.J.Costa & P.Soriano; Pinus × suevica Bertsch; Pinus sylvestris subsp. engadinensis (Heer) Asch. & Graebn.

= Pinus × rhaetica =

Nothospecies of plant

Pinus × rhaetica, also known as Rhaetic pine, is a natural hybrid between mountain pine (Pinus mugo) and Scots pine (Pinus sylvestris). It is a coniferous tree nothospecies classified in Pinus subsection Pinus. The species name refers to the Rhaetian Alps, located in eastern Switzerland and western Austria.

== Description ==
Pinus × rhaetica has variable morphology. Commonly Rhaetic pines grow as trees, although some are shrubby in form. The trees are 4.5–8 m tall, 3 m broad.

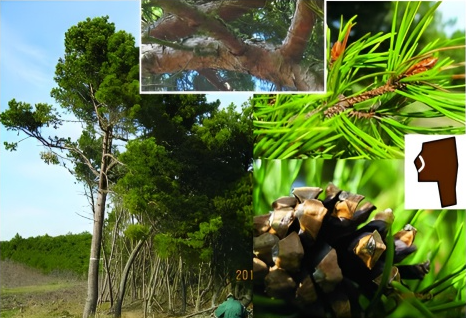
Putative Pinus mugo (female) × P. sylvestris (male) hybrid. The larger tree is the hybrid, the smaller tree is a P. mugo. Morphology of Pinus × rhaetica

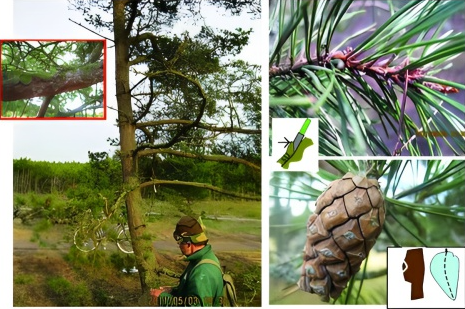
Morphology of a putative P. sylvestris (female) × P. mugo (male) hybrid

The trunk is grey-brown, greyer and more frequently divided into irregular plates than in Pinus mugo. The bark on major branches resembles that of P. sylvestris in being reddish brown with papery flakes, but it can also be more like P. mugo, greyish and persistent.

The shoots are uninodal, yellowish-brown to blackish-brown, with leaves in pairs, arranged in dense spirals on the shoot. The leaves (needles) are 2.3–5.4 cm long, variably dark or bright green (as in P. mugo), to glaucous green (as in P. sylvestris), with finely serrated margins and a persistent dark grey to brown basal sheath.

The seed cones resemble those of P. mugo, with strongly developed apophyses on one side, and are often more robust than those of P. sylvestris. The young cones are purple-brown, matt, with a 3 mm long stalk. The mature cones are oval, 2.8–5.7 cm long and 1.7–3.4 cm wide when closed.

== Distribution and habitat ==
The Rhaetic pine (Pinus × rhaetica) occurs occasionally throughout the regions where the two species overlap, on the northern side of the French Pyrenees, and through the Alps to the Carpathians in Slovakia, usually at the junction of the sub-alpine habitat of P. mugo and the montane forests of P. sylvestris.

In Poland, the Rhaetic pine is considered an endangered species with a high risk of extinction in nature in the near future.

The Rhaetic pine has been found in some Baltic states, with very sparse populations present in western Lithuania, derived from spontaneous hybrids between local native Scots pine and introduced cultivated mountain pine.

== See also ==
- Hybridization in pines
