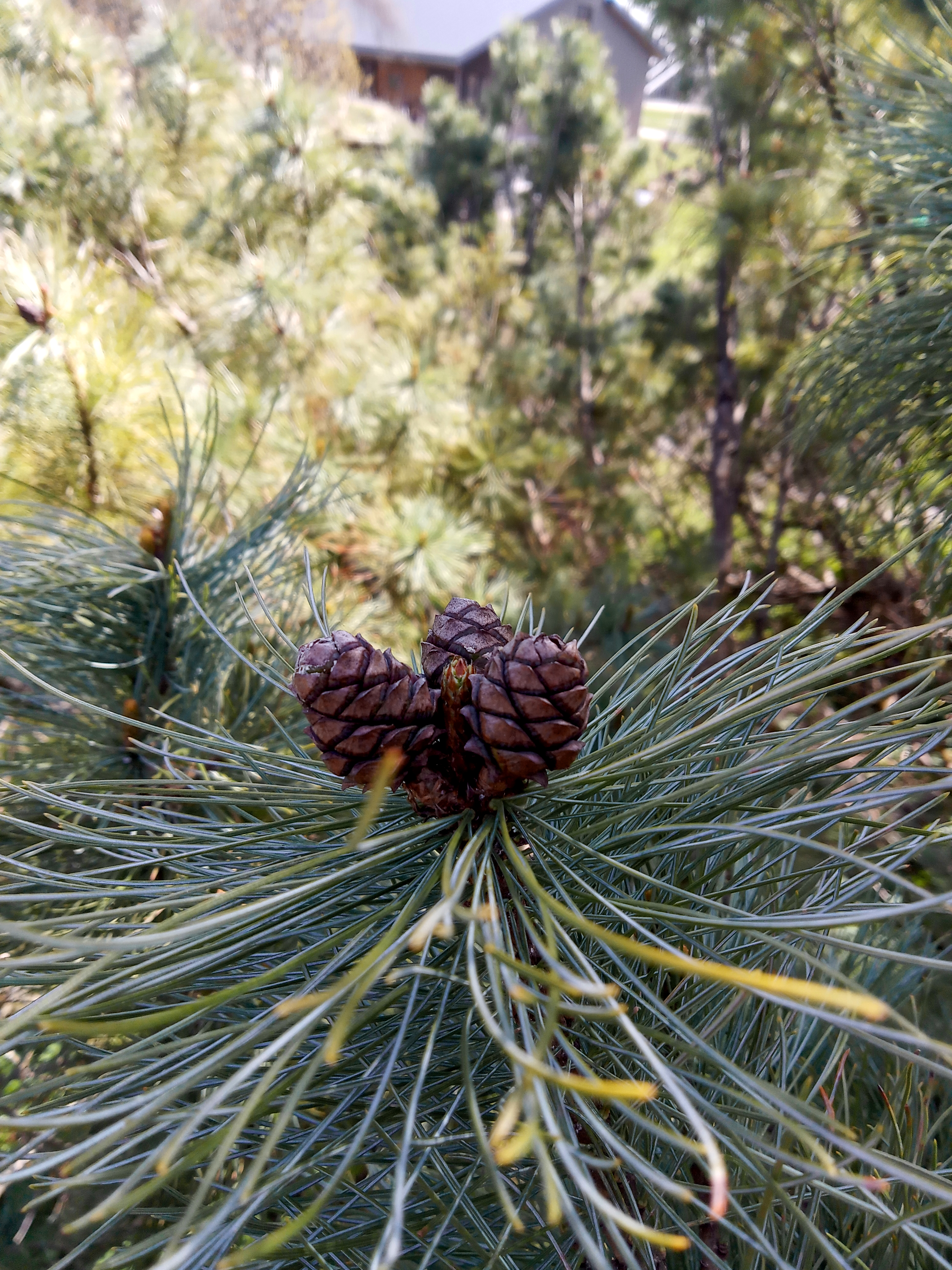
- Pinus pumila × P. sibirica cones on a Japanese stone pine (Pinus pumila)

Scientific classification
- Kingdom: Plantae
- Clade: Tracheophytes
- Clade: Gymnosperms
- Division: Pinophyta
- Class: Pinopsida
- Order: Pinales
- Family: Pinaceae
- Subfamily: Pinoideae
- Genus: Pinus
- Species: P. pumila × P. sibirica
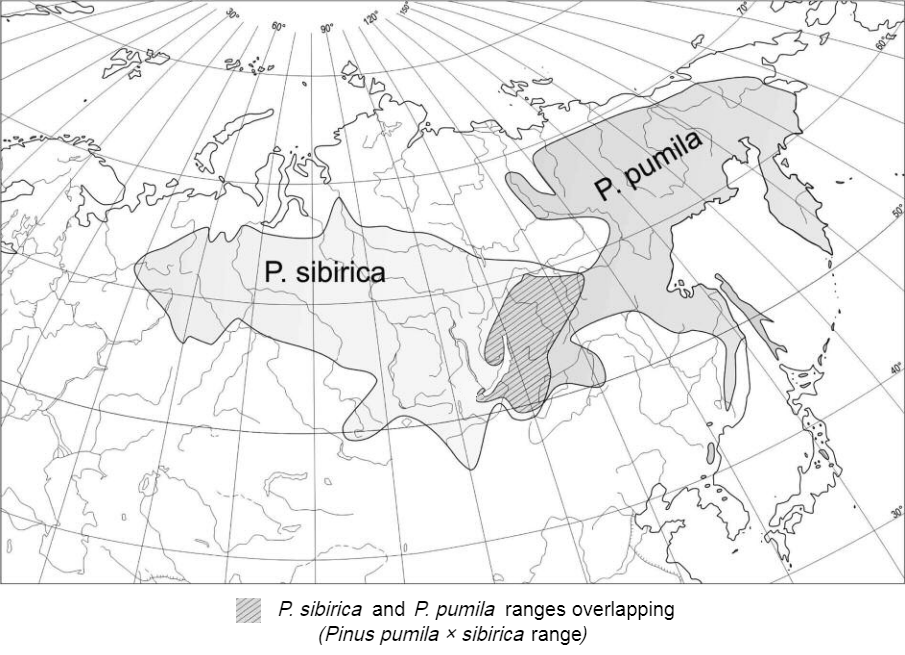
- Distribution map

= Pinus pumila × P. sibirica =

Pine tree cross breed

Pinus pumila × P. sibirica is a putative hybrid of Japanese stone pine (P. pumila) and Siberian pine (P. sibirica). It has not yet been officially described.

== Description ==
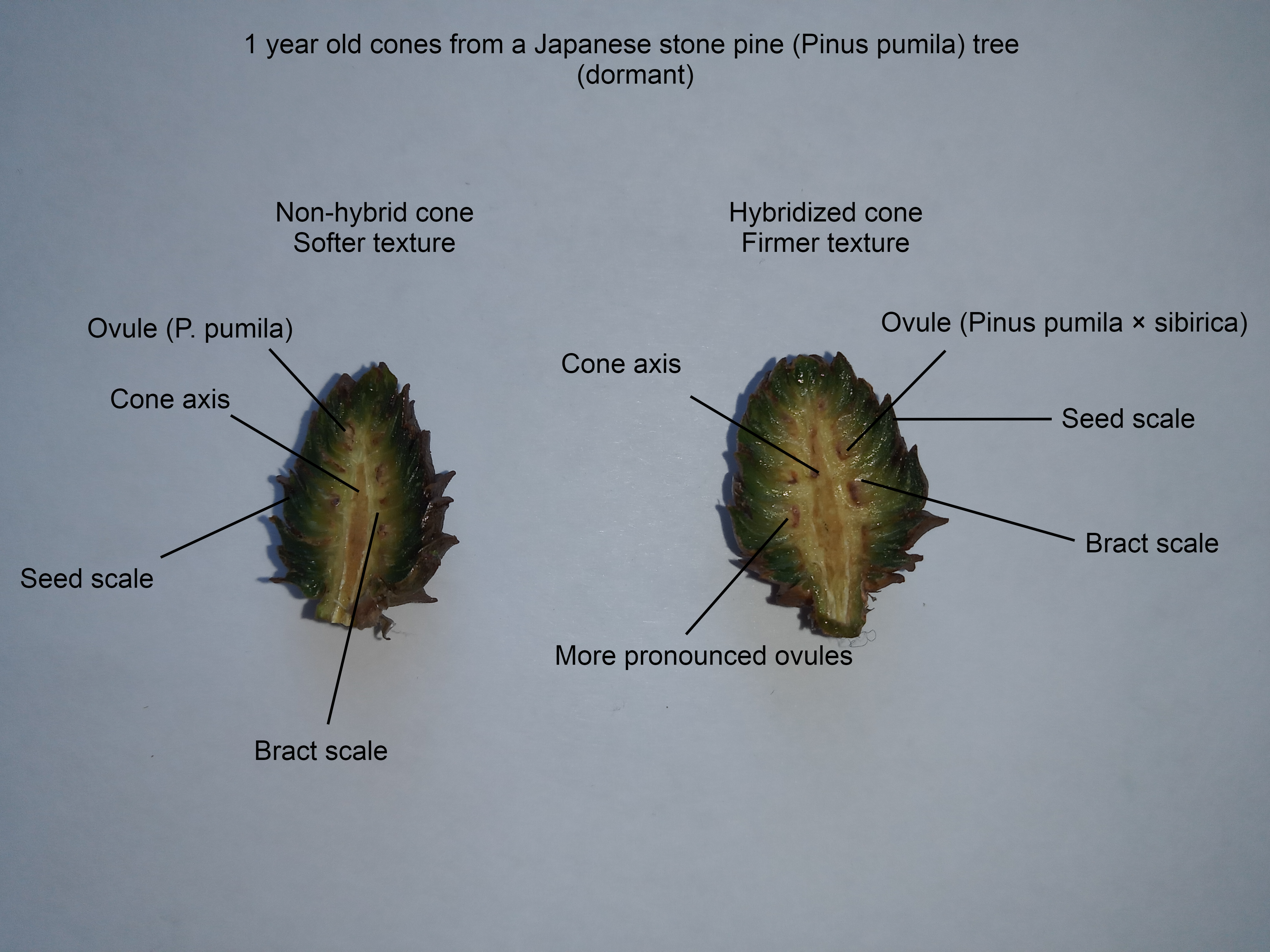
Japanese stone pine cone (Pinus pumila) (left) and Japanese stone pine × Siberian pine cone (Pinus pumila × P. sibirica) (right). Anatomy of the cones and visible morphological differences in the hybridized cone. The cones were taken from a single specimen, a 30 year old P. pumila tree

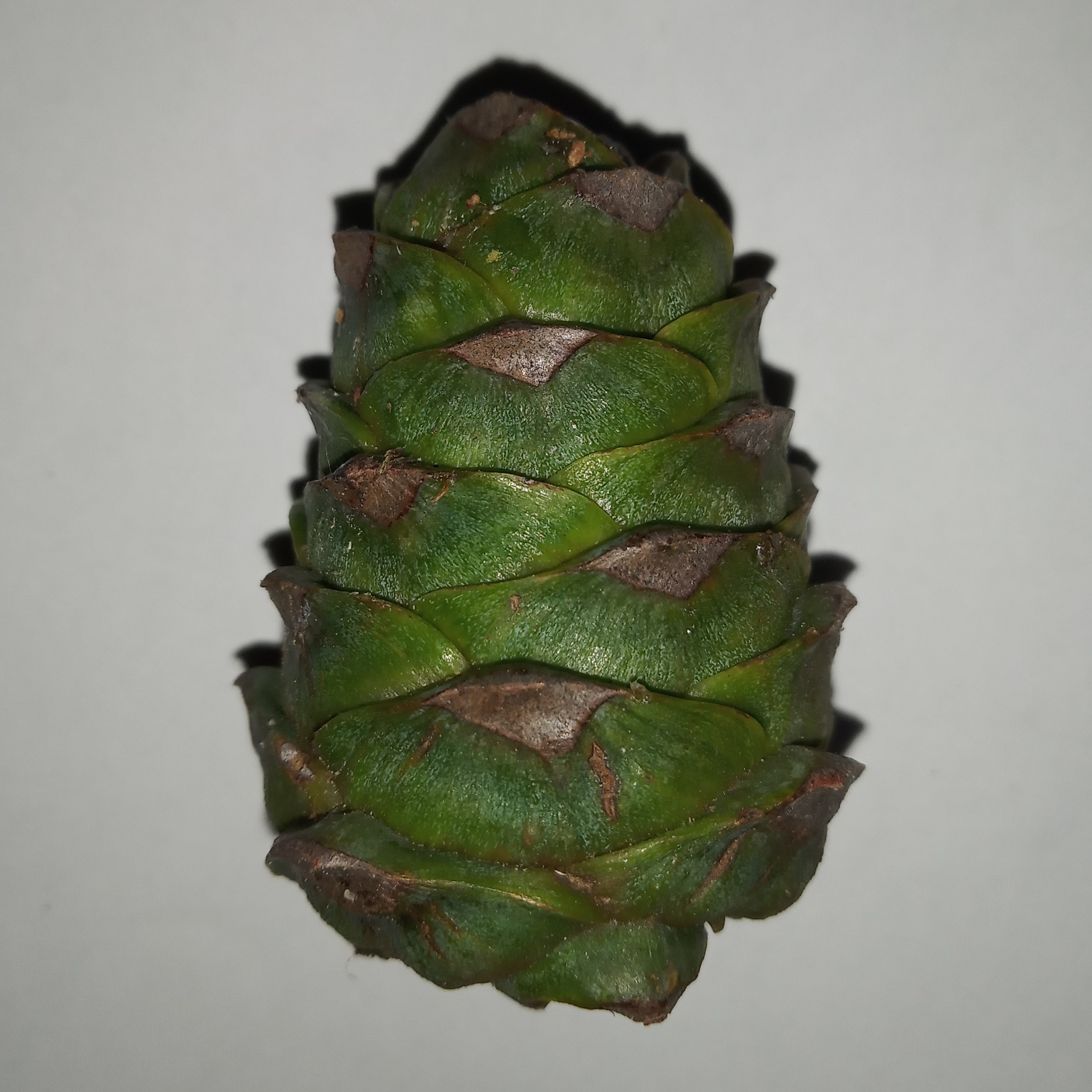
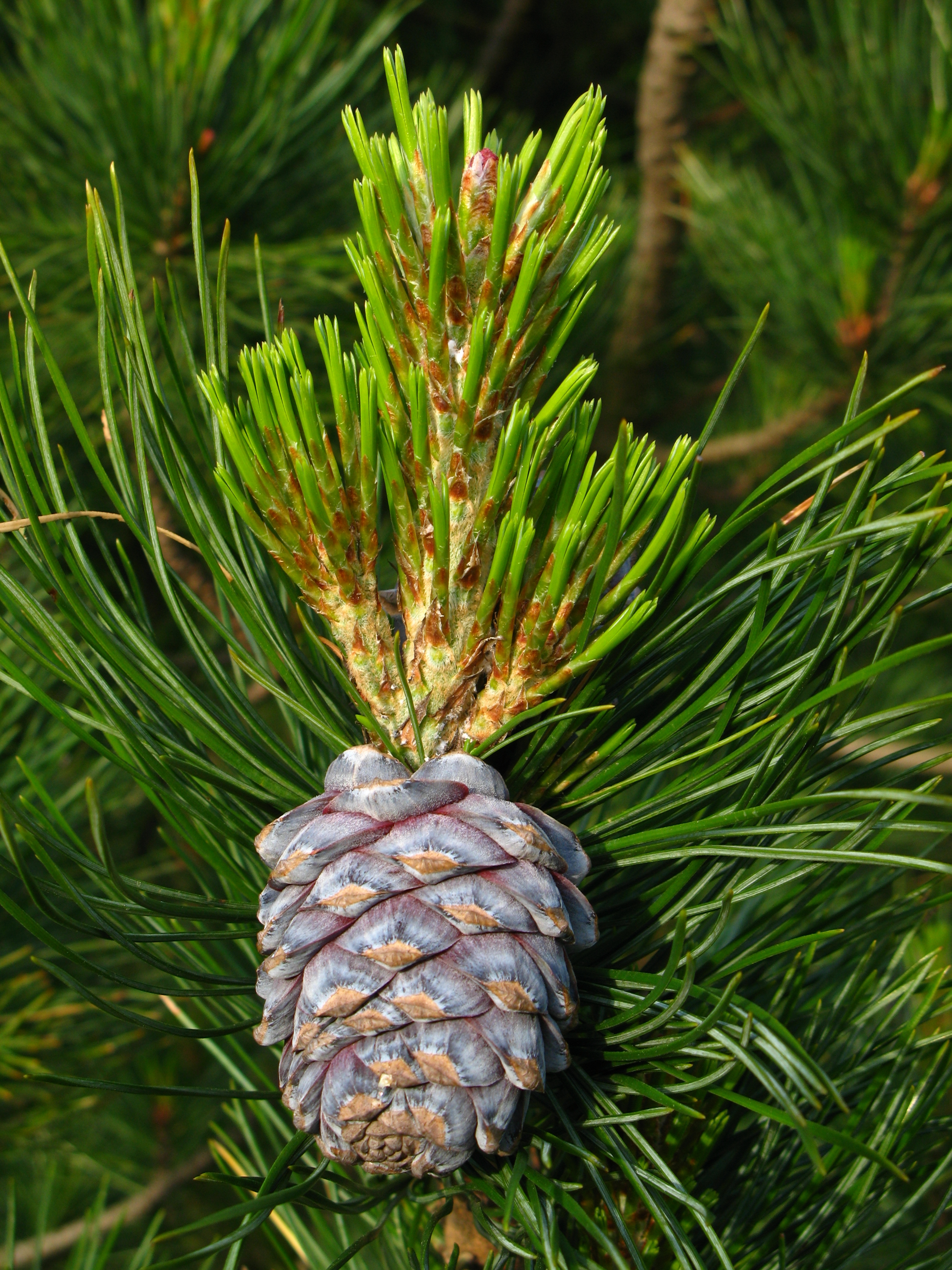
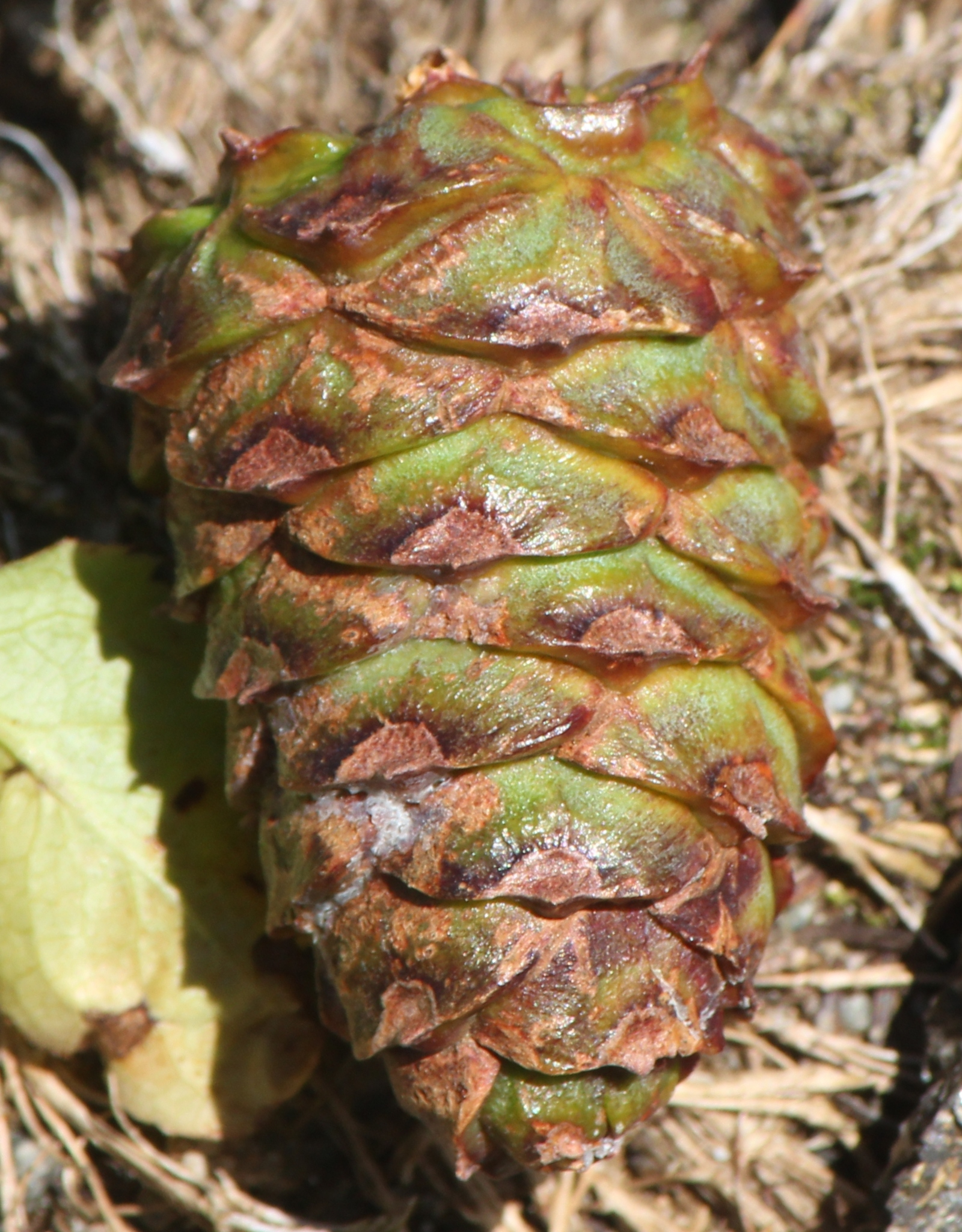
Visual comparison of immature Pinus pumila × P. sibirica, Pinus sibirica, Pinus pumila cones. Clockwise from top left:
- Immature Pinus pumila × P. sibirica cone from a Pinus pumila (from National Botanic Garden of Latvia)
- Immature Pinus sibirica cone (from PAN Botanical Garden in Warsaw)
- Pinus pumila cone (from Mount Norikura, Takatama, Japan)

Pinus pumila × P. sibirica is a small tree about 4 metres (13 feet) tall with a broad open crown, and dark brown bark. The trunk is not vertical, it is often curved.

Maximum height (from 1.5 to 3 m depending on light and soil conditions) is reached at 100–150 years, and then height remains more or less constant. Once the tree reaches a height of 4–5 m (rarely 6–7 m and higher) damage to the branches becomes inevitable. The broken branches can take root, the ability to produce specialized roots from latent buds inherited from P. pumila. These traits vary among sites where the hybrids are found.

The pine cones of the tree resemble the cones of the Siberian pine (P. sibirica). The cones are larger and thicker and not as much elongated as Japanese stone pine (P. pumila) cones. On average the cones are 4 cm long and 3 cm wide. Each cone contains 40 nut-like seeds. Seeds are on average 8 mm long. Only about 15% (at most) of the seeds in the cones are fertile. Ripe cones are purple, just like those of P. sibirica. Seed development and production are very poor in the putative hybrids, indicating that introgression occurs very slowly or does not occur beyond the first filial generation.

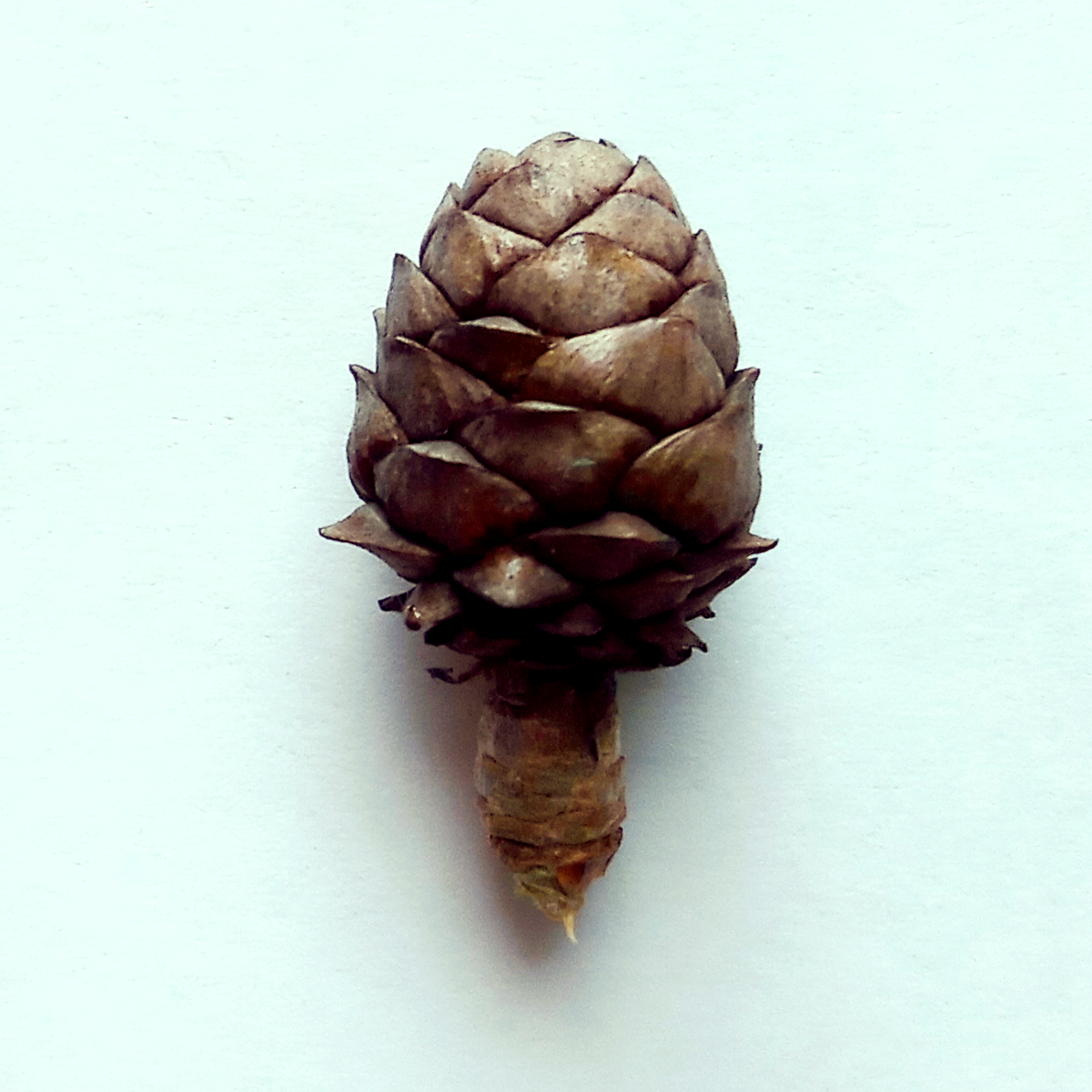
1 year old dormant Pinus pumila × P. sibirica cone

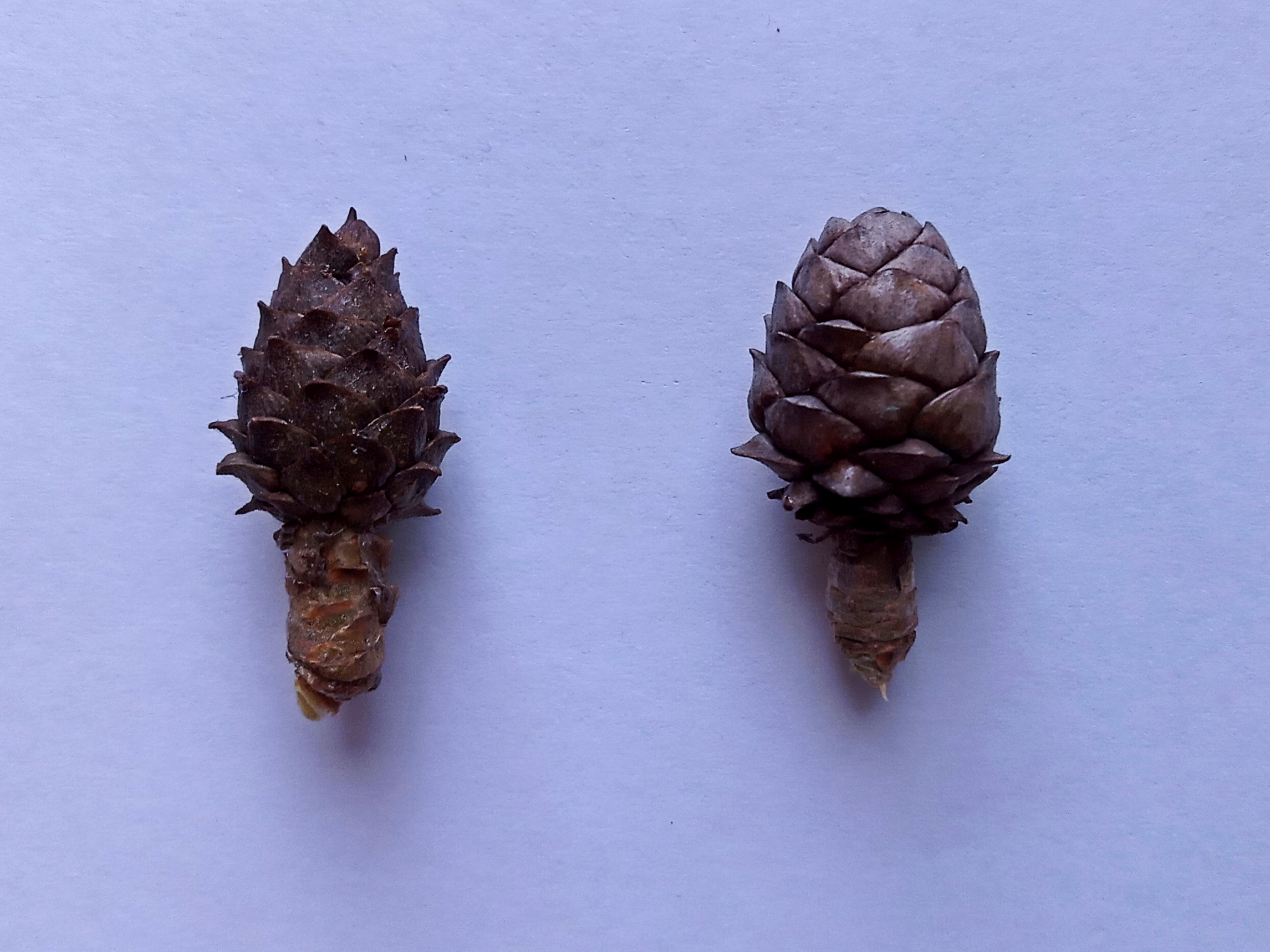
Pinus pumila (left) and Pinus pumila × P. sibirica (right) cone

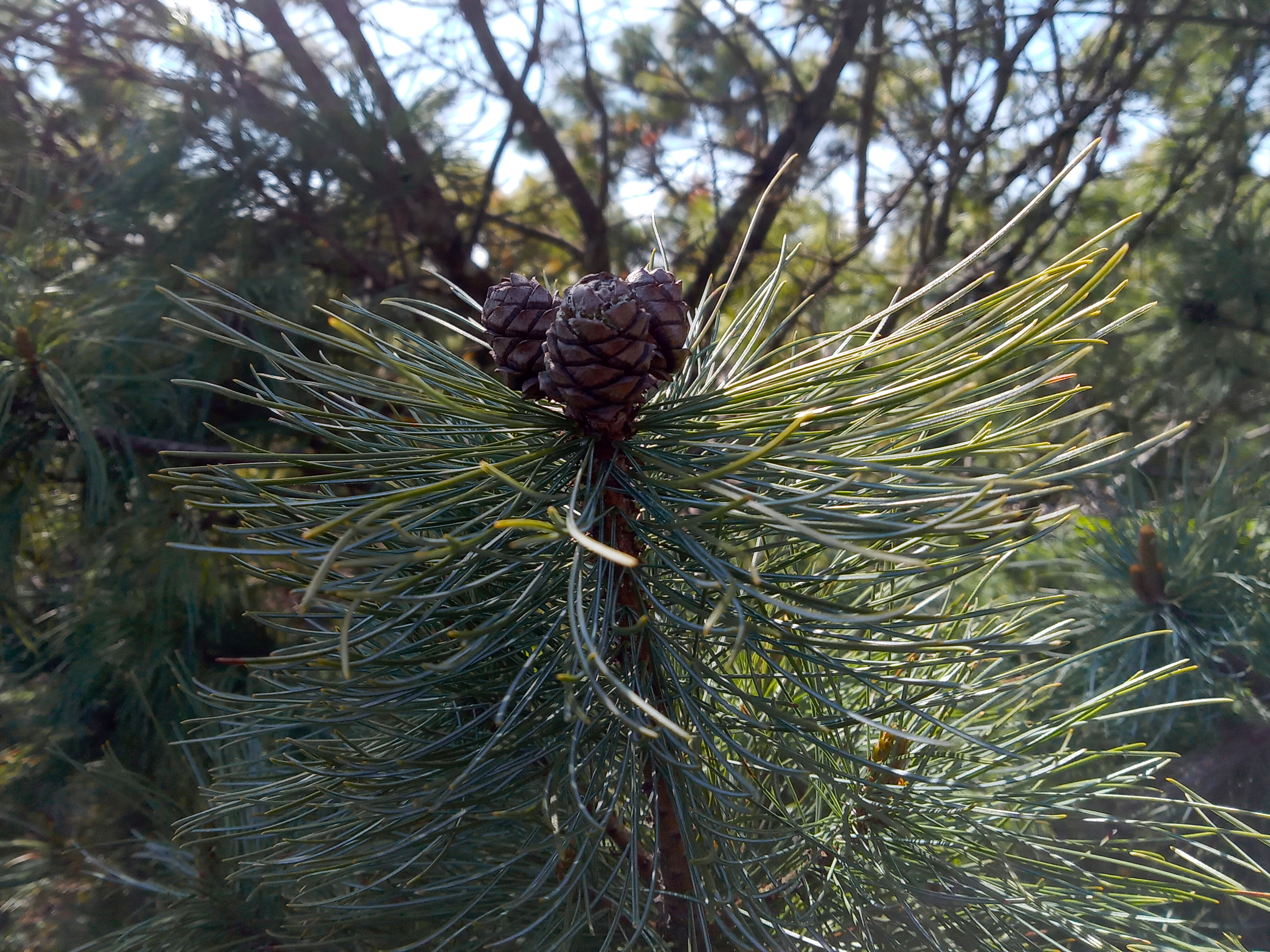
Pine cones 1 month after breaking dormancy (on Pinus pumila)

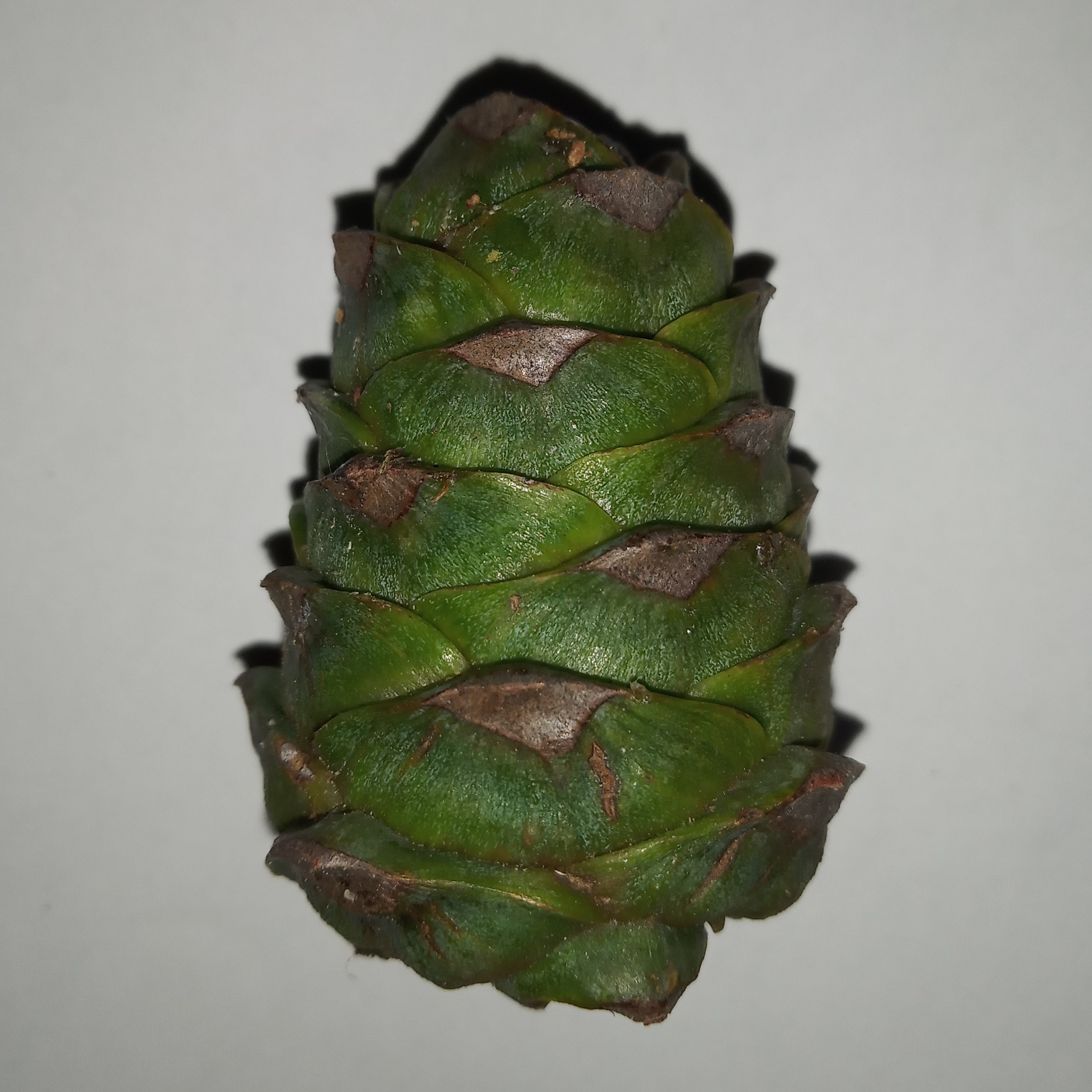
Immature cone from Pinus pumila, it is speculated that this megastrobilus was pollinated by a Pinus sibirica

== Distribution and habitat ==
Pinus pumila × P. sibirica naturally occurs in the Baikal region of Siberia (Russia) where P. pumila and P. sibirica ranges overlap, that is Irkutsk Oblast, some parts of Yakutia and Buryatia. At altitudes of 2,000 to 2,100 m (timberline), Japanese stone pine and dwarfed, sterile Siberian stone pine occur together. This increases the chances of hybridization between the two species.

In the depression near Chortovo Lake (51°29'N 103°35'E), the Pinus pumila × P. sibirica trees possess the intermediate traits compared with parental species, whereas on the slopes, they acquire a creeping form and can only be distinguished from P. pumila by their large, purple cones.

== See also ==
- Hybridization in pines
