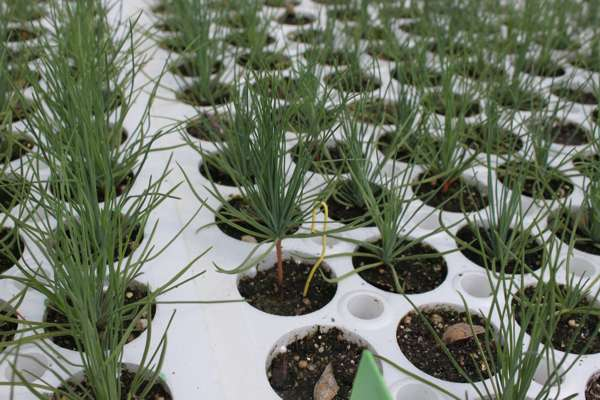
- Sonderegger pine seedling (with yellow paperclip) among longleaf pine seedlings showing the elongated stem of this species

Conservation status
- Unrankable (NatureServe)

Scientific classification
- Kingdom: Plantae
- Clade: Tracheophytes
- Clade: Gymnosperms
- Division: Pinophyta
- Class: Pinopsida
- Order: Pinales
- Family: Pinaceae
- Genus: Pinus
- Subgenus: P. subg. Pinus
- Section: P. sect. Trifoliae
- Subsection: P. subsect. Australes
- Species: P. × sondereggeri

Binomial name
- Pinus × sondereggeri H.H.Chapm.

= Pinus × sondereggeri =

Sonderegger pine

Species of conifer

Pinus × sondereggeri is the only named southern pine hybrid. Its common names include Sonderegger pine and bastard pine. It is a naturally occurring cross between loblolly pine (P. taeda) and longleaf pine (P. palustris). It was originally described by H. H. Chapman (1922), who named it after its discoverer, V. H. Sonderegger, a state forester of Louisiana. This pine usually occurs singly or in small groups where both loblolly and longleaf pines overlap in range. Because both parental trees usually produce cones at the same time of year, no phenological barrier exists, thus the two freely cross.

Tree characteristics are normally intermediate between loblolly and longleaf. Sonderegger pine is not resistant to fusiform rust like its parent, longleaf pine. Because this hybrid pine possesses heavy limbs and long-needled foliage like the longleaf pine, one may confuse Sonderegger pine with longleaf pine. However, the striped brown bud of Sonderegger pine is a distinguishing characteristic, as longleaf possesses a white bud. Also, intermediate in size, the cone is armed similarly to a cone of the loblolly pine. Because no grass stage exists for this hybrid, it has significant height growth during the first year. Thus, it is easily detected in uniform plantings of longleaf pine.

Also called "bastard pine", Sonderegger pine may have qualities superior to those of its parents. Differences in wood properties are insignificant when compared to random samples of the two parent species. Tracheid length might be slightly shorter than either parent, though tracheid length in southern pines usually does not differ significantly.
