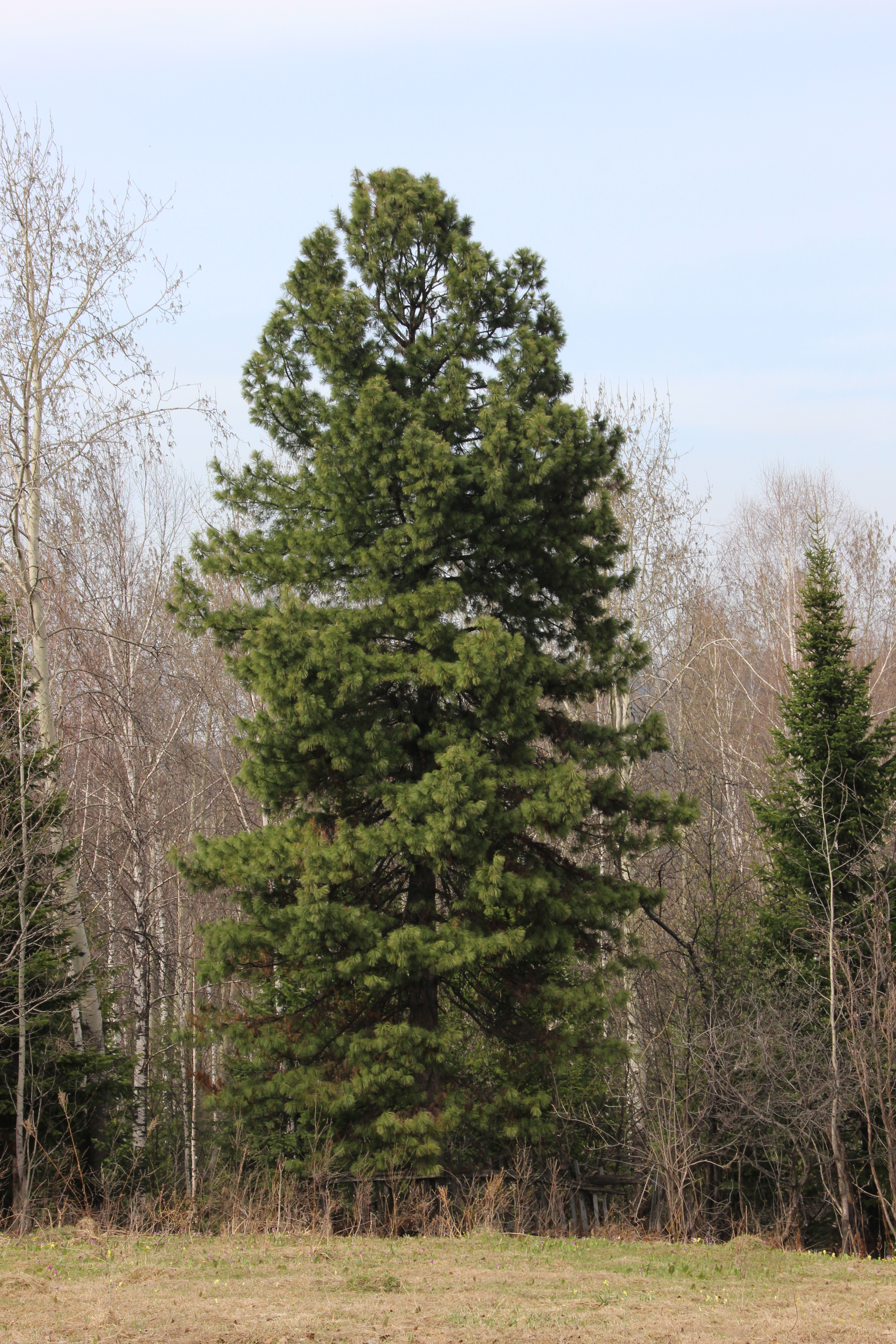

Conservation status
- Least Concern (IUCN 3.1)

Scientific classification
- Kingdom: Plantae
- Clade: Tracheophytes
- Clade: Gymnospermae
- Division: Pinophyta
- Class: Pinopsida
- Order: Pinales
- Family: Pinaceae
- Genus: Pinus
- Subgenus: P. subg. Strobus
- Section: P. sect. Quinquefoliae
- Subsection: P. subsect. Strobus
- Species: P. sibirica

Binomial name
- Pinus sibirica Du Tour

Synonyms
- Pinus arolla Petrov; Pinus cembra f. coronans (Litv.) Krylov; Pinus cembra subsp. sibirica (Du Tour) A.E.Murray; Pinus cembra var. sibirica (Du Tour) A.E.Murray; Pinus cembra var. sibirica (Du Tour) G.Don; Pinus cembra subsp. sibirica (Du Tour) Krylov; Pinus coronans Litv.; Pinus hingganensis H.J.Zhang

= Pinus sibirica =

Siberian pine Pinus sibirica

Species of conifer

Pinus sibirica, or Siberian pine, in the family Pinaceae is a species of pine tree that occurs in Siberia from 58°E in the Ural Mountains east to 126°E in the Stanovoy Range in southern Sakha Republic, and from Igarka at 68°N in the lower Yenisei valley, south to 45°N in central Mongolia.

== Description ==
Pinus sibirica is a member of the white pine group, Pinus subgenus Strobus, and like all members of that group, the leaves ('needles') are in fascicles (bundles) of five, with a deciduous sheath. They are 5–10 cm long. Siberian pine cones are 5–9 cm long. The 9–12 mm long seeds have only a vestigial wing and are dispersed by spotted nutcrackers.

Siberian pine is treated as a variety or subspecies of the very similar Swiss pine (Pinus cembra) by some botanists. It differs in having slightly larger cones, and needles with three resin canals instead of two in Swiss pine.

Like other European and Asian white pines, Siberian pine is very resistant to white pine blister rust (Cronartium ribicola). This fungal disease was accidentally introduced from Europe into North America, where it has caused severe mortality in the American native white pines in many areas, notably the closely related whitebark pine. Siberian pine is of great value for research into hybridisation and genetic modification to develop rust resistance in these species.

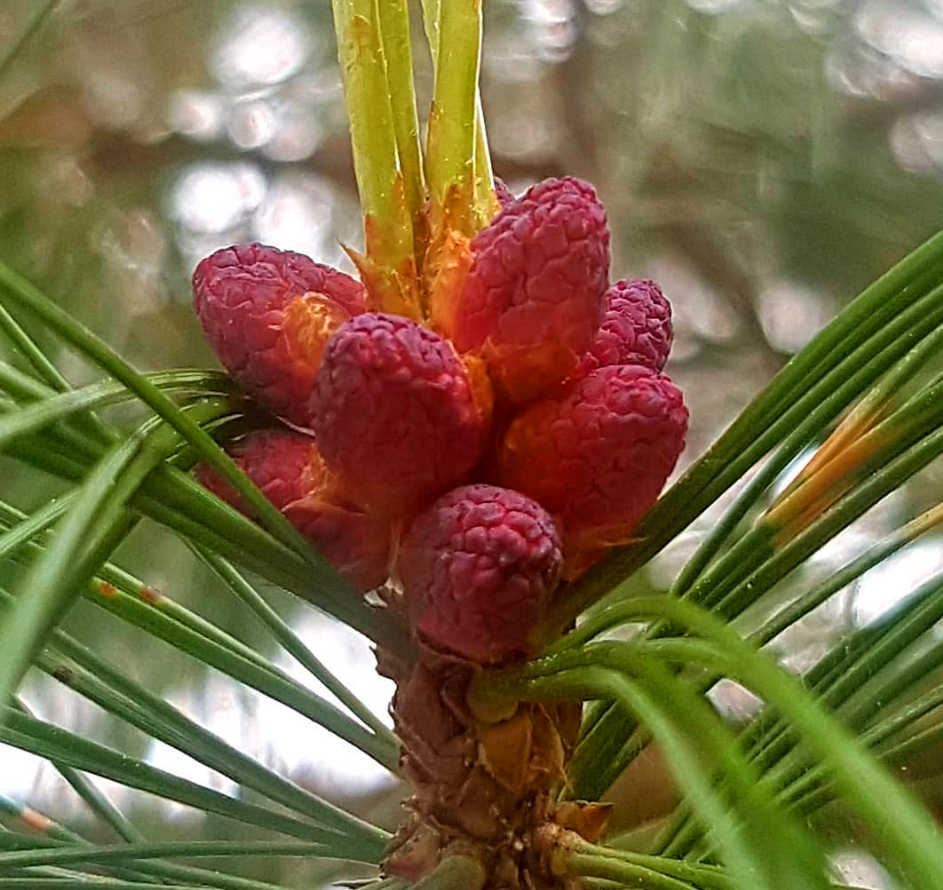
Flowering pine cones

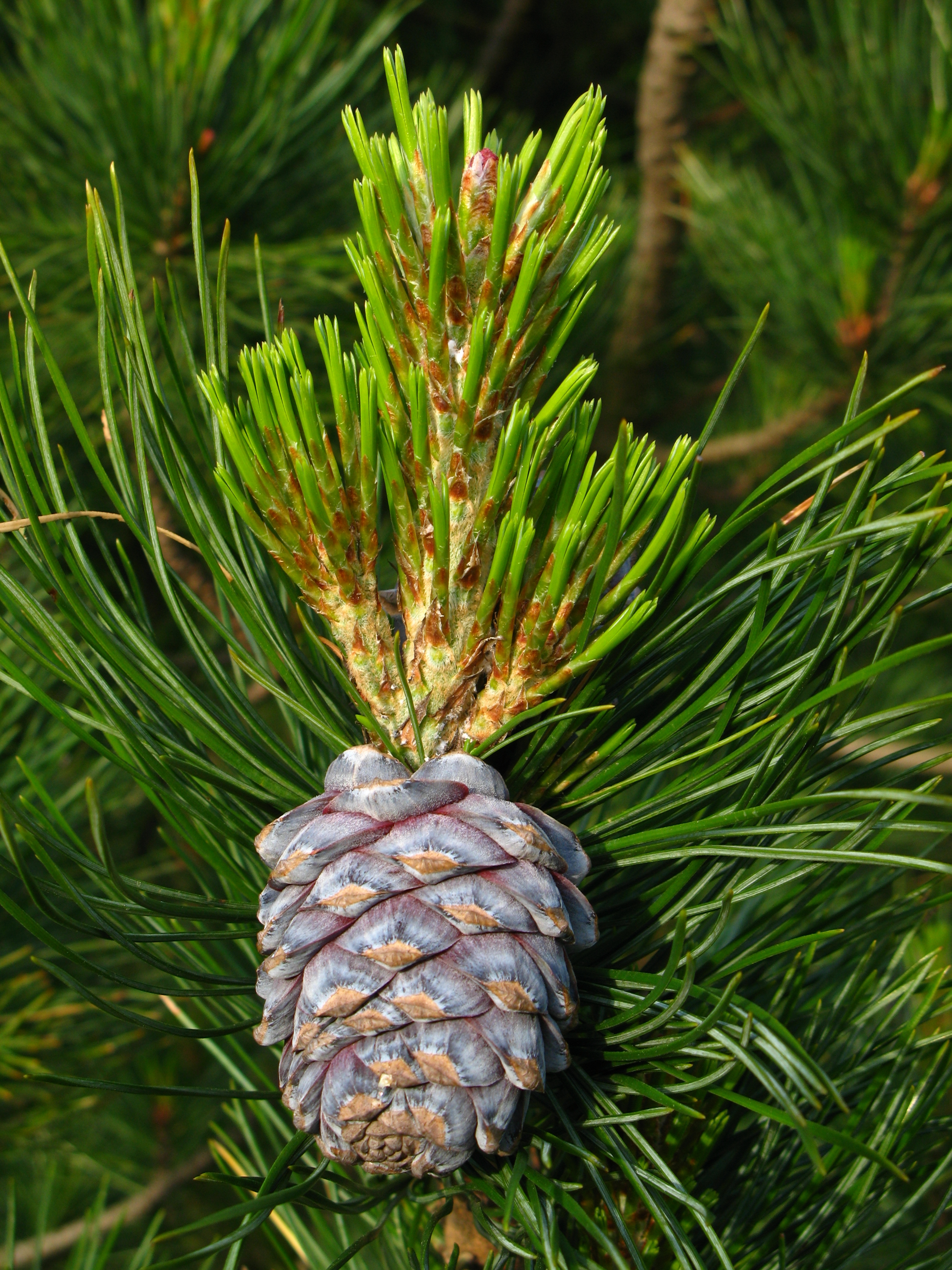
Cone

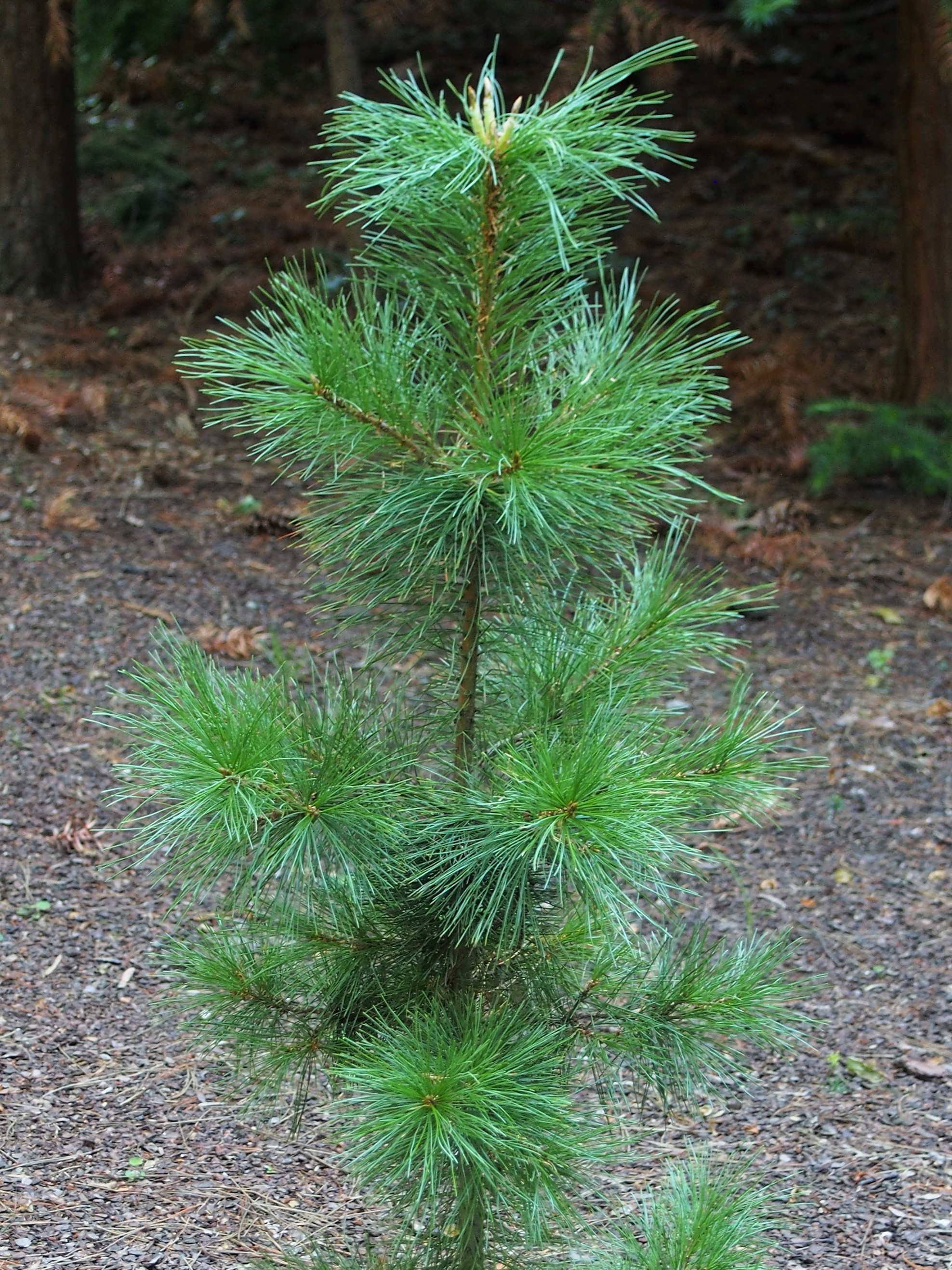
Foliage

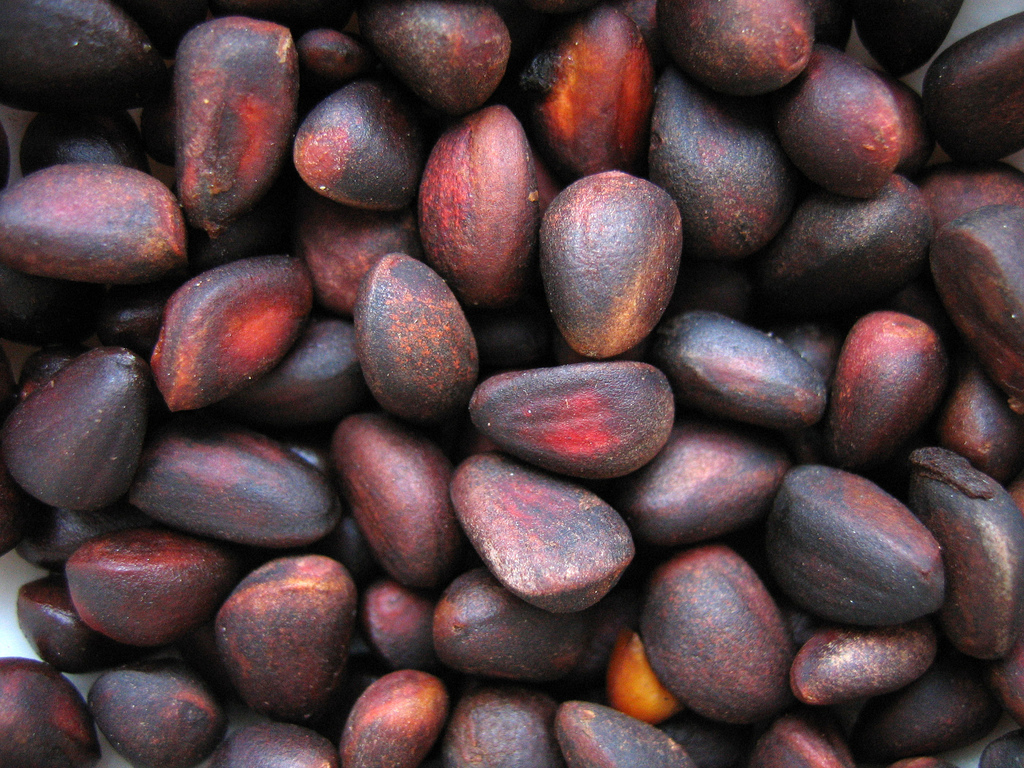
seeds

== Distribution ==
In the north of its range, it grows at low altitudes, typically 100–200 m, whereas further south, it is a mountain tree, growing at 1,000-2,400 m altitude. It often reaches the alpine tree line in this area. The mature size is up to 30–40 m height, and 1.5 m trunk diameter. Its maximum lifetime is 800–850 years.

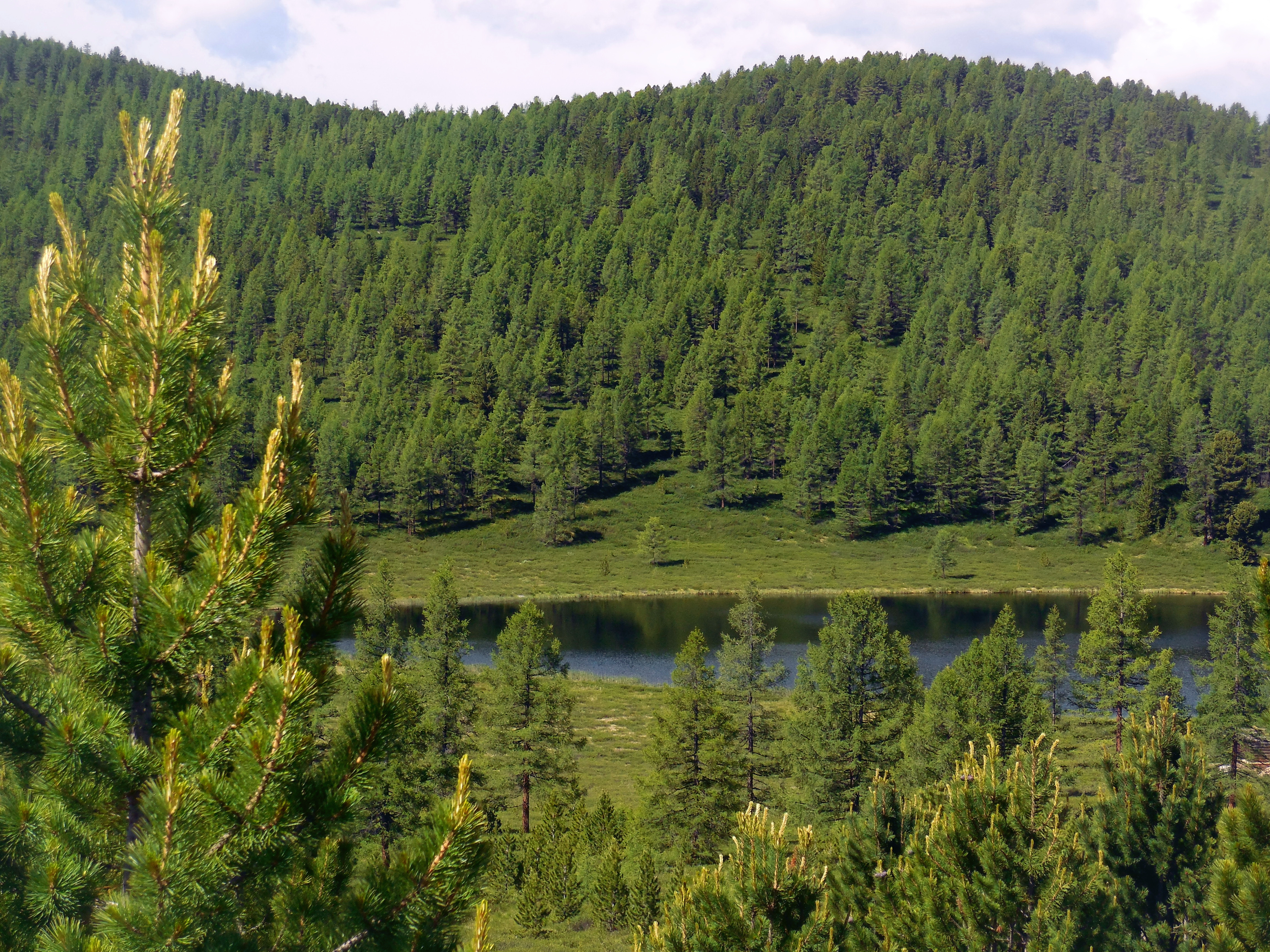
Pinus sibirica Ulagansky Pass near Ulagan, Russia

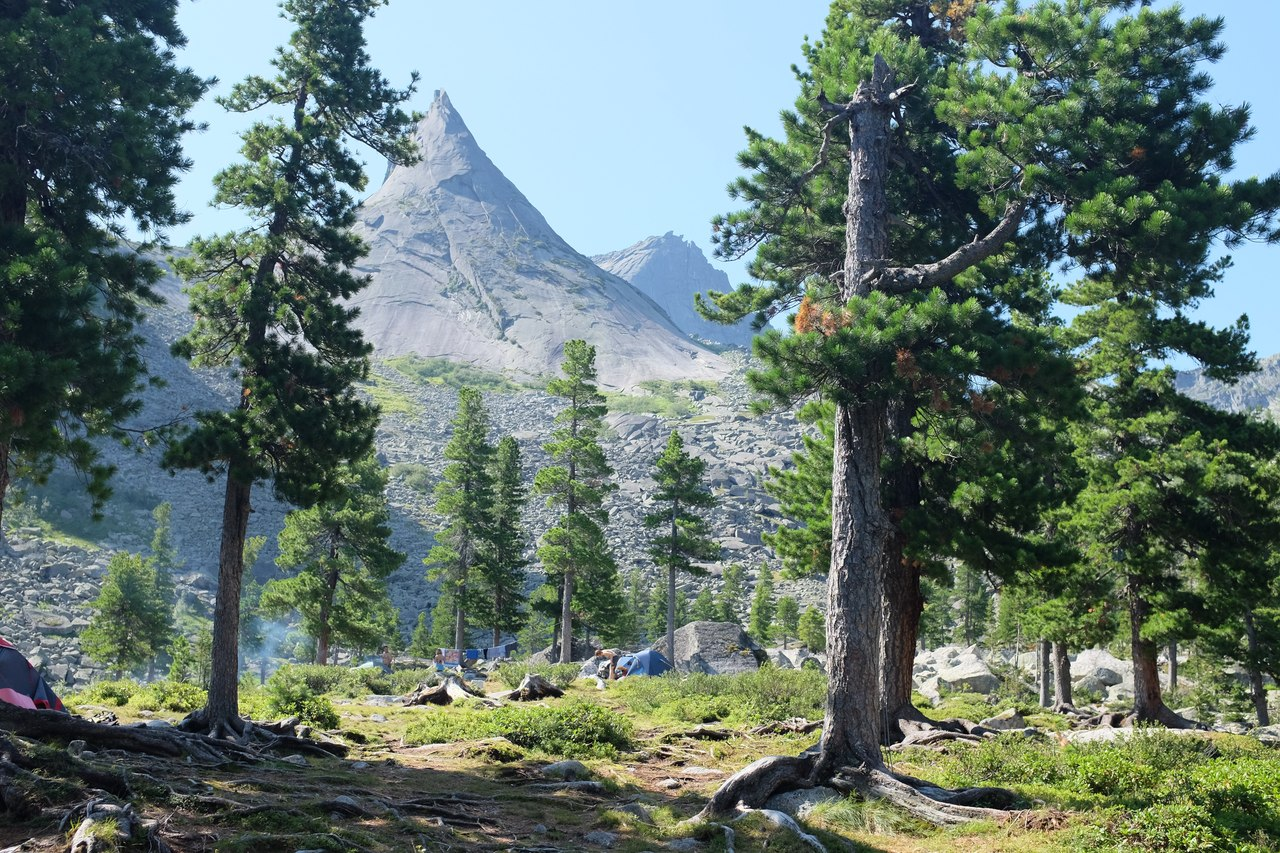
Pinus sibirica in Ergaki, Ermakovskiy district

== Cultivation ==
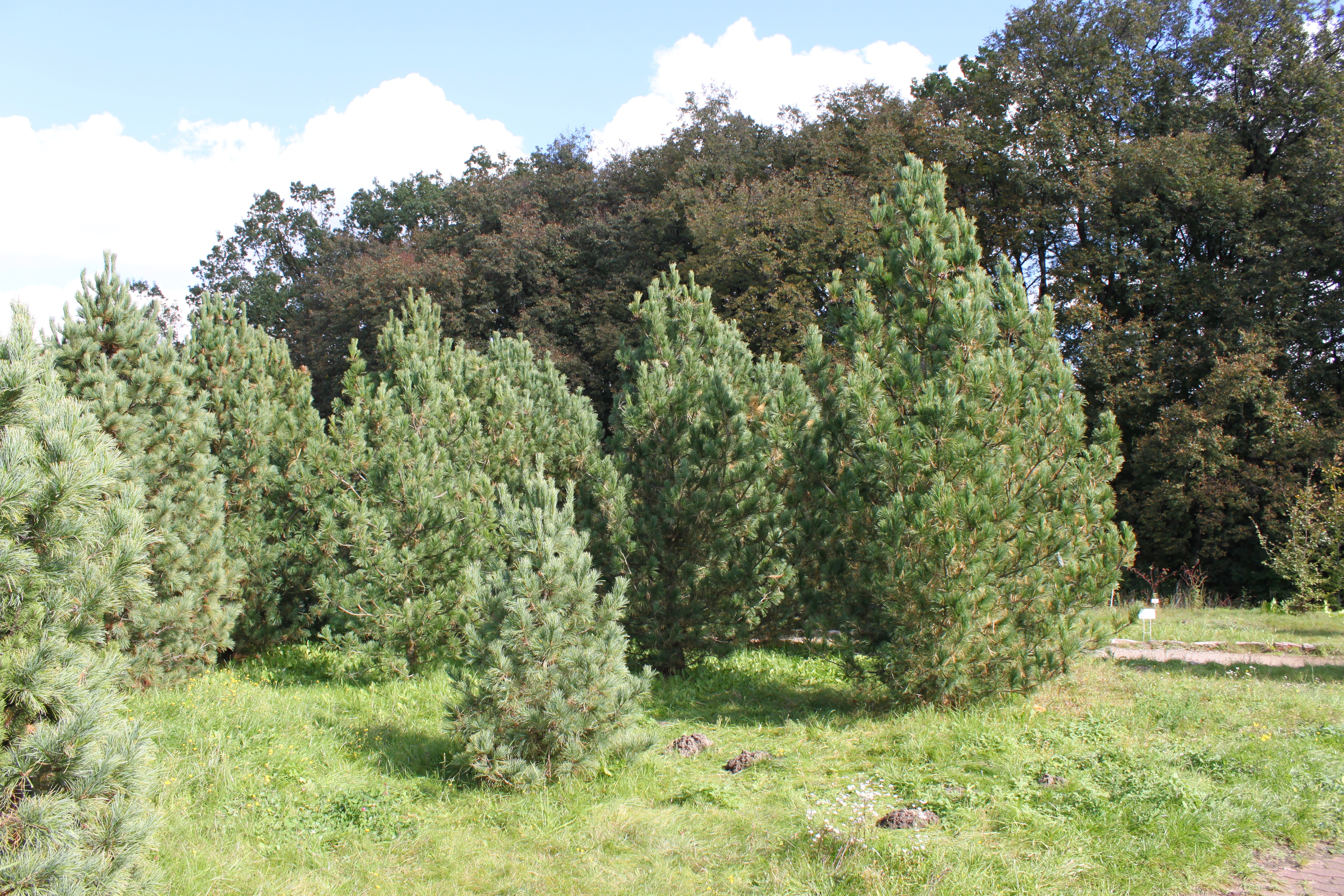
Young trees growing in a park

Siberian pine, Pinus sibirica, is a popular ornamental tree in parks and large gardens where the climate is cold, such as central Canada, giving steady though not fast growth on a wide range of sites. It is very tolerant of severe winter cold, hardy down to at least –60 °C, and also of wind exposure.

The seeds are also harvested and sold as pine nuts, which in Russia are marketed as Cedar nuts (Russian: Кедровые орехи).

== "Siberian cedar" ==
The Russian name Сибирский кедр (tr. Sibirsky kedr) is usually translated in English as "Siberian cedar." References to "cedar" or "dwarf cedar" in texts translated from Russian usually refer to this tree or related pines, not to true cedars.

== Chemistry ==
Pinostilbene is a stilbenoid found, along with resveratrol, in the bark of P. sibirica.

== See also ==
- Pinus pumila × P. sibirica
