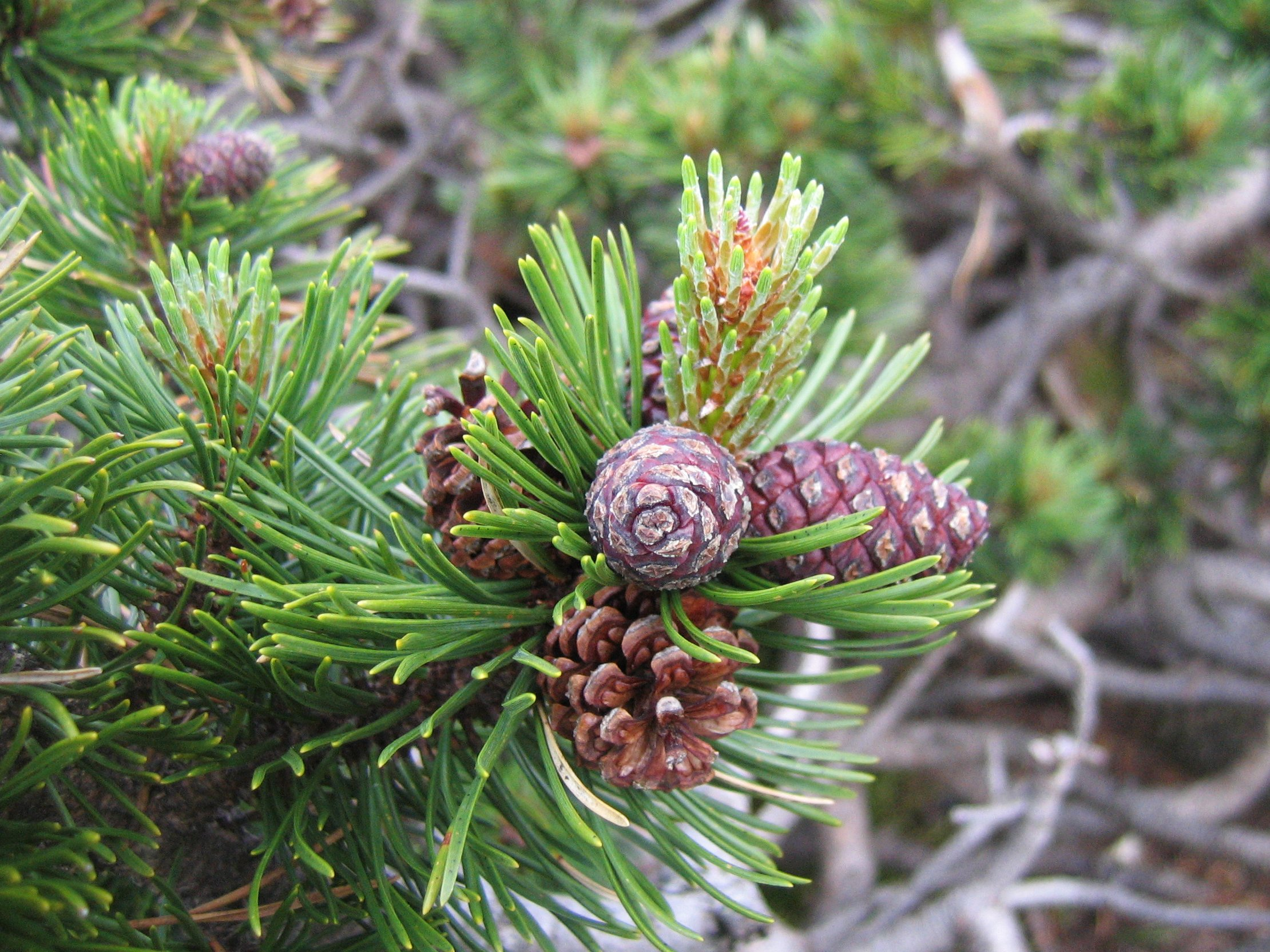
- Pinus mugo subsp. mugo

Conservation status
- Least Concern (IUCN 3.1)

Scientific classification
- Kingdom: Plantae
- Clade: Tracheophytes
- Clade: Gymnosperms
- Division: Pinophyta
- Class: Pinopsida
- Order: Pinales
- Family: Pinaceae
- Genus: Pinus
- Subgenus: P. subg. Pinus
- Section: P. sect. Pinus
- Subsection: P. subsect. Pinus
- Species: P. mugo

Binomial name
- Pinus mugo Turra
- Distribution map: Pinus mugo subsp. uncinata (syn. Pinus uncinata). Pinus mugo subsp. mugo and Pinus mugo subsp. rotundata.

Synonyms
- List: Pinus × obliqua var. centrapedunculata Woerl.; Pinus applanata (Booth ex Loudon) Willk.; Pinus digenea Wettst. nom. illeg.; Pinus echinata Carrière nom. inval.; Pinus fischeri Booth ex P.Laws. nom. illeg.; Pinus magellensis Schouw; Pinus montana Mill.; Pinus mugho Laichard. [Spelling variant]; Pinus mughus Scop.; Pinus obliqua var. centrapedunculata Woerl.; Pinus pumilio (Haenke in Jirazek et al) Franco; Pinus pumilio Haenke; Pinus rostrata K.Koch nom. inval.; Pinus rubriflora Loudon ex Gordon nom. inval.; Pinus sanguinea Lapeyr.; Pinus squamosa Bosc ex Loudon; Pinus sylvestris var. montana (Mill.) Aiton; Pinus sylvestris var. montana (Mill.) Dum. Cours.; Pinus sylvestris var. montana (Mill.) Wahlenb.; Pinus sylvestris var. palustris Hagenb.; Pinus sylvestris var. pumilio (Haenke) Gaudin; Pinus wettsteinii Fritsch

= Pinus mugo =

Species of plant

Pinus mugo, known as mountain pine, dwarf mountain pine, scrub mountain pine, Swiss mountain pine, bog pine, creeping pine, or mugo pine, is a species of conifer, a pine native to high elevation habitats from southwestern to central and southeastern Europe.

== Description ==
Pinus mugo is a tree or shrub, growing from 1–25 metres (3 ft 3 in – 82 ft 0 in) tall. It has dark green leaves ("needles") in pairs, 3–6 centimetres (1.2–2.4 inches) (rarely to 8 cm (3.1 in)) long, with a persistent basal sheath; the foliage varies minimally between the subspecies. The cones are reddish-purple when growing, ripening nut-brown, 2.5–6 cm (0.98–2.36 in) long, variably symmetrical to asymmetrical depending on subspecies (see below).

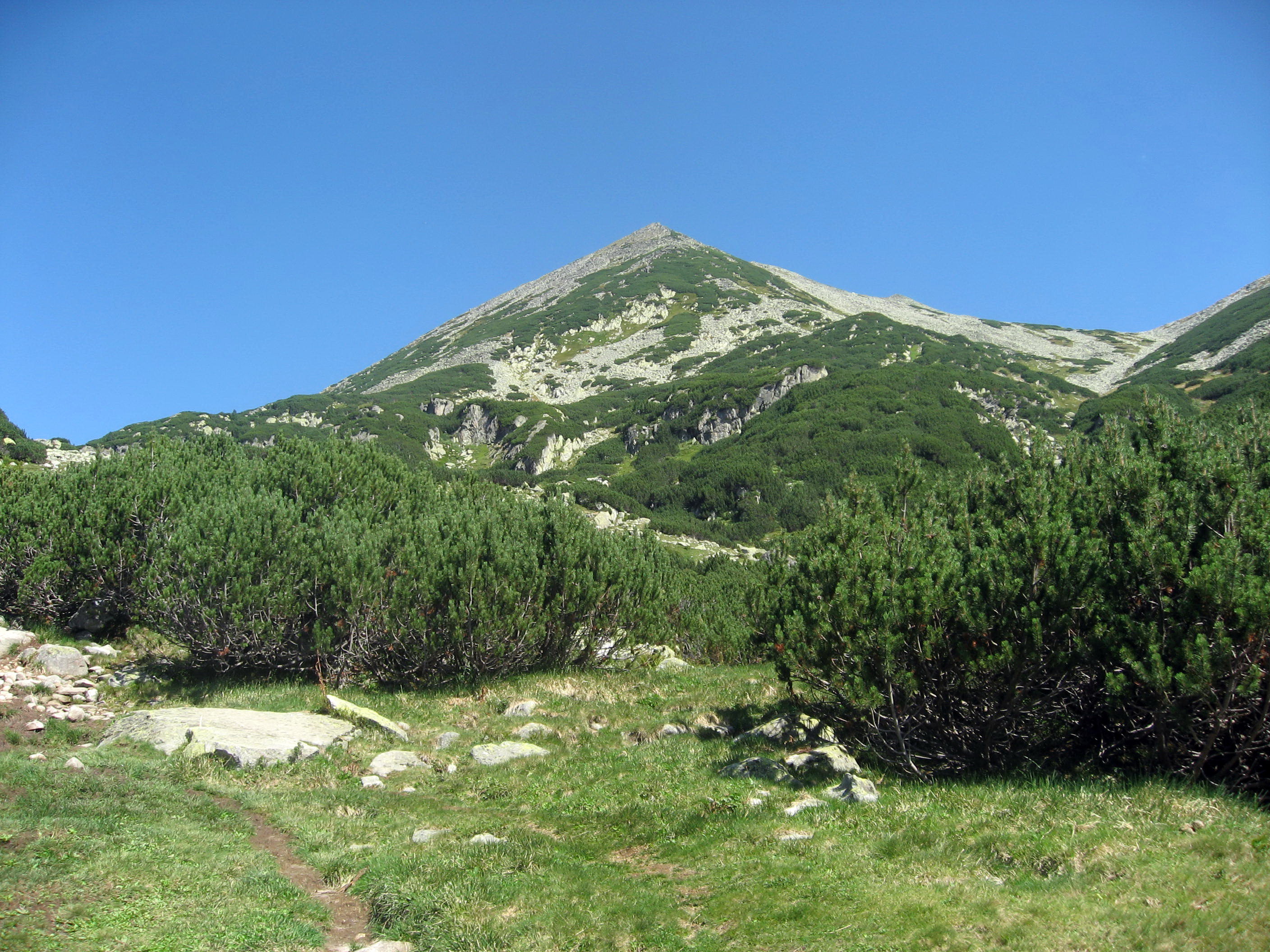
Pinus mugo subsp. mugo, Romania

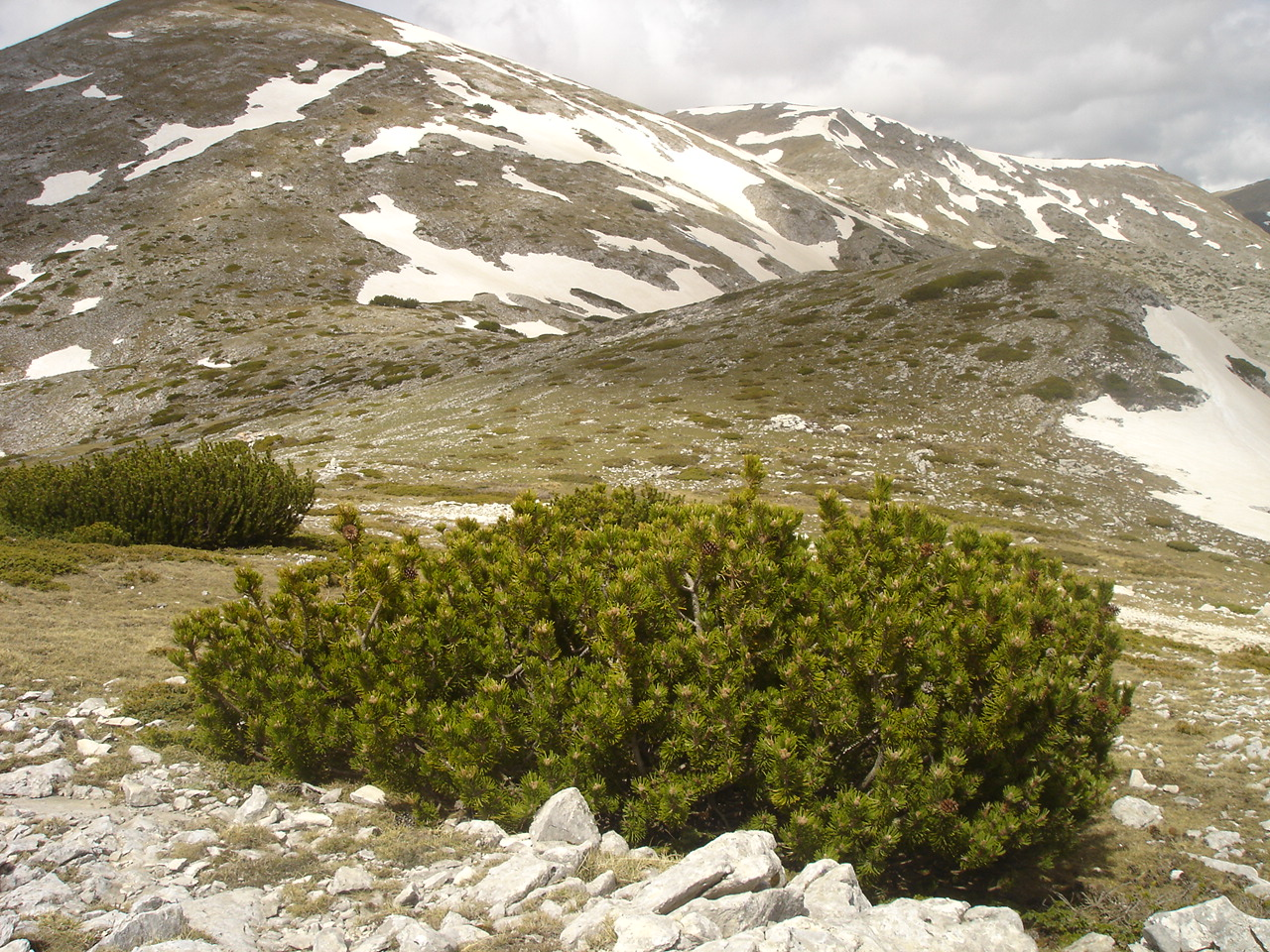
Pinus mugo subsp. mugo, Jakupica mountain, Republic of North Macedonia

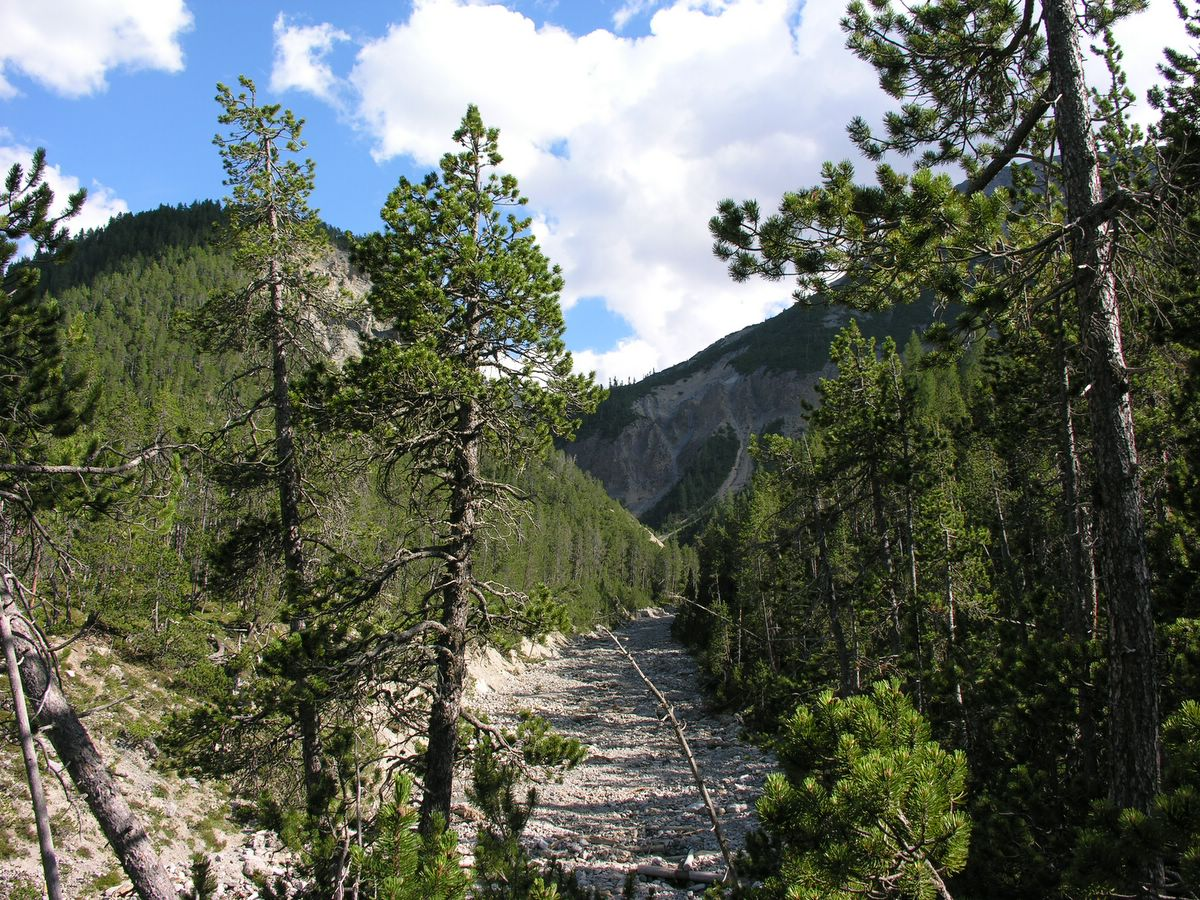
Pinus mugo subsp. rotundata, Swiss National Park

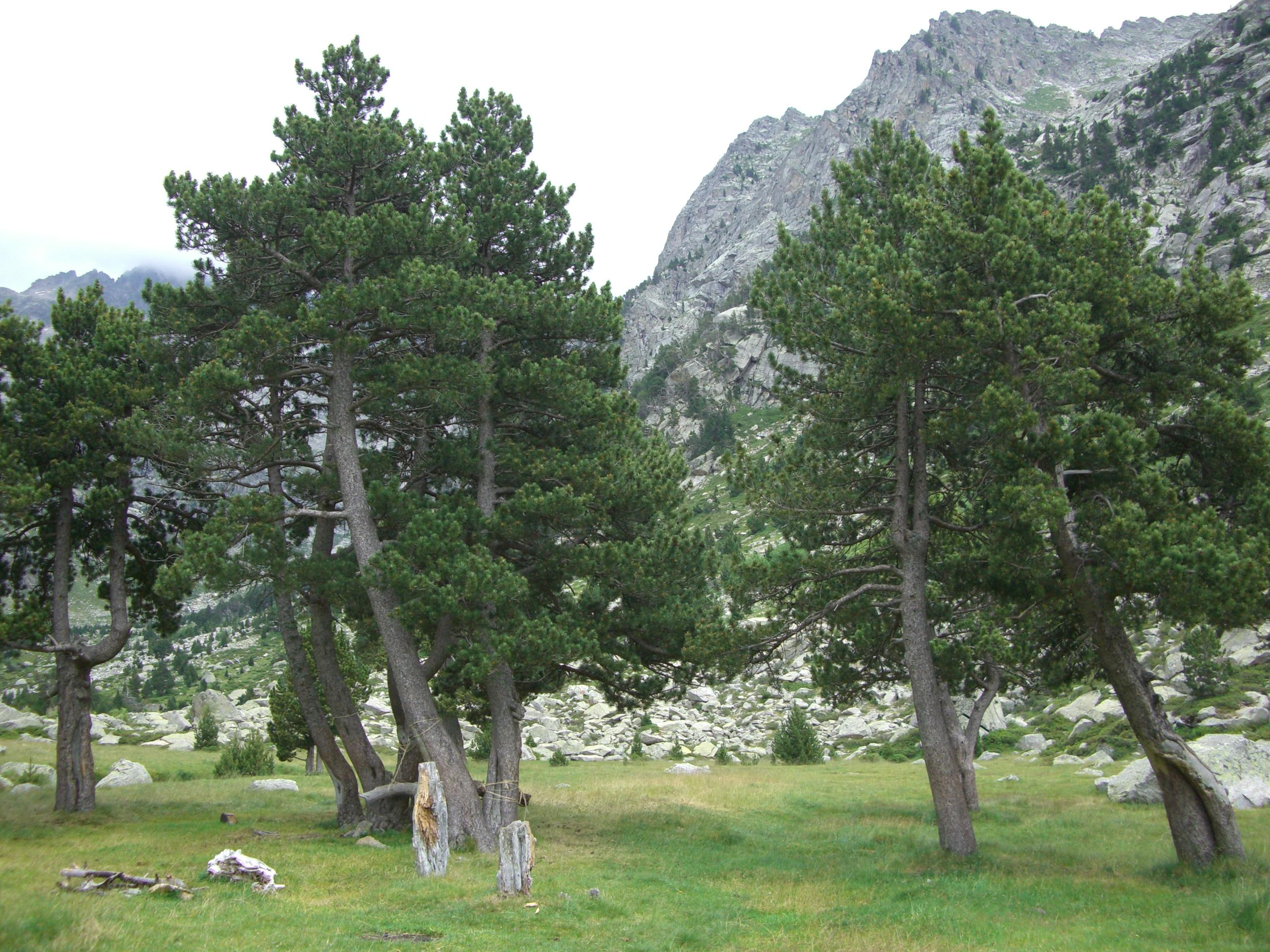
Pinus mugo subsp. uncinata, Pyrenees

== Taxonomy ==
There are three subspecies:

- Pinus mugo subsp. mugo — in the east and south of the range (southern & eastern Alps, southern and eastern Carpathians, Balkan Peninsula), a low, shrubby, often multi-stemmed plant to 1–4 metres (3–13 feet) (rarely 6 m (20 ft)) tall with matt-textured symmetrical cones, which are thin-scaled. The type locality is on Monte Baldo in northern Italy.
- Pinus mugo subsp. uncinata (Ramond) Domin — in the west and north of the range (from the Pyrenees northeast to Poland), a larger, usually single-stemmed tree to 25 m (82 ft) tall with glossy-textured asymmetrical cones, the scales of which are much thicker on the upper side.
- Pinus mugo nothosubsp. rotundata (Link) Janchen & Neumayer — a hybrid swarm between the above two subspecies, intergrading extensively in the western and northern Alps and northern Carpathians.

Treatment of these taxa varies widely. The European Forest Genetic Resources Programme follows the above treatment, while the Plants of the World Online takes a more 'splitting' approach, treating the western subspecies as a separate species Pinus uncinata Ramond ex DC., following Farjon (2005). Yet others take a more 'lumping' view, treating it at only the lower rank of variety, when the valid name becomes Pinus mugo var. rostrata.

While the extremes are easily identifiable from cone structure, they intergrade completely, making separation at species rank problematic. Genetic evidence from multiple studies shows very little distinction between the taxa, with only weak differentiation; some studies showing extensive mutual paraphyly between them, and others showing little or no distinction.

A synonym for the species, Pinus montana Mill., was widely used in the past, and a typographical error "mugho" (first made in a prominent 18th-century encyclopedia) persisted in occasional use until around 2020.

Pinus mugo occasionally hybridises with Pinus sylvestris; the hybrid is named Pinus × rhaetica. Hybrids have also been reported, but not verified, with Pinus nigra and Pinus heldreichii.

== Distribution ==
Pinus mugo is native to the subalpine zones of the Pyrenees, the Massif Central (rare), the Alps, Erzgebirge, Carpathians, northern and central Apennines (rare), and higher Balkan Peninsula mountains (Rila, Pirin, Korab, Prokletije, etc.). The species typically marks the alpine tree line or timberline across these mountains, at the edge of the habitat at which trees are capable of growing. It is usually found from 1,000–2,200 m (3,300–7,200 ft), occasionally as low as 150–200 m (490–660 ft) in the north of the range in Germany and Poland, and in the south of the range as high as 2,700 m (8,900 ft) in the Rila and Pirin Mountains of Bulgaria.

=== Naturalisation ===
In Scandinavia, Finland and the Baltic region, P. mugo was introduced in the late 1700s and the 1800s, when it was planted in coastal regions for sand dune stabilisation, and later as ornamental plants around residences. In Denmark, Norway and Sweden, the species has naturalised and become invasive, displacing fragile dune and dune heath habitats. In Estonia and Lithuania P. mugo only occasionally naturalises outside plantations, sometimes establishing in raised bogs. In New Zealand, Pinus mugo is classed as a wilding conifer, and spreads as an invasive species in the high country of New Zealand.

== Cultivation ==
Pinus mugo is widely cultivated as an ornamental plant, for use as a small tree or shrub, planted in gardens and in larger pots and planters. It is also used in Japanese garden style landscapes, and for larger bonsai specimens. In Kosovo, its trunk is used as construction material for the vernacular architecture in the mountains called "Bosonica".

=== Cultivars ===
Numerous cultivars have been selected. The following have been given the Royal Horticultural Society's Award of Garden Merit:

- 'Humpy'
- 'Kissen'
- 'Mops'
- 'Ophir'

Cultivars with seasonal changes in foliage color include Pinus mugo 'Wintergold' and Pinus mugo 'Ophir'.

== Uses ==
The mugo pine is used in cooking. The young cones can be made into a syrup called "pinecone syrup", "pine cone syrup", or mugolio. Buds and young cones are harvested from the wild in the spring and left to dry in the sun over the summer and into autumn. The cones and buds gradually drip syrup, which is then boiled down to a concentrate and combined with sugar; alternatively, the pinecones can be macerated in sugar, fermented, and strained.

== Gallery ==
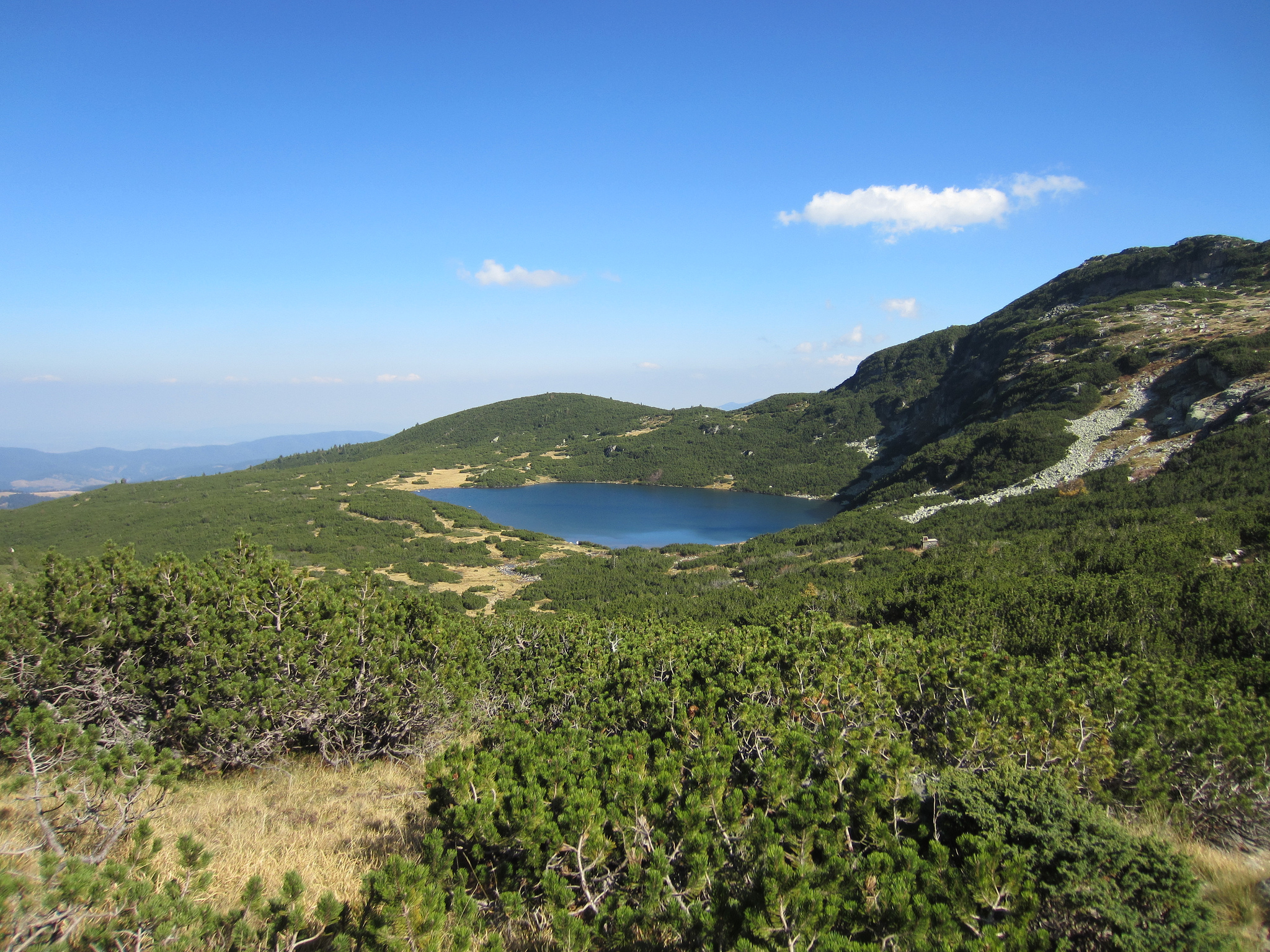
Pinus mugo (subsp. mugo) habitat. Rila National Park in Bulgaria.

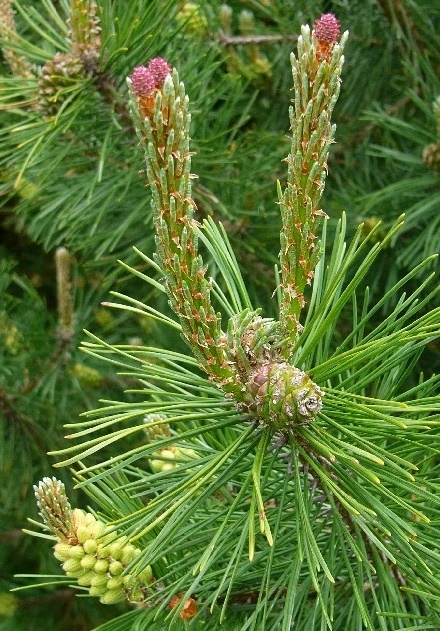
Female cones and young shoots

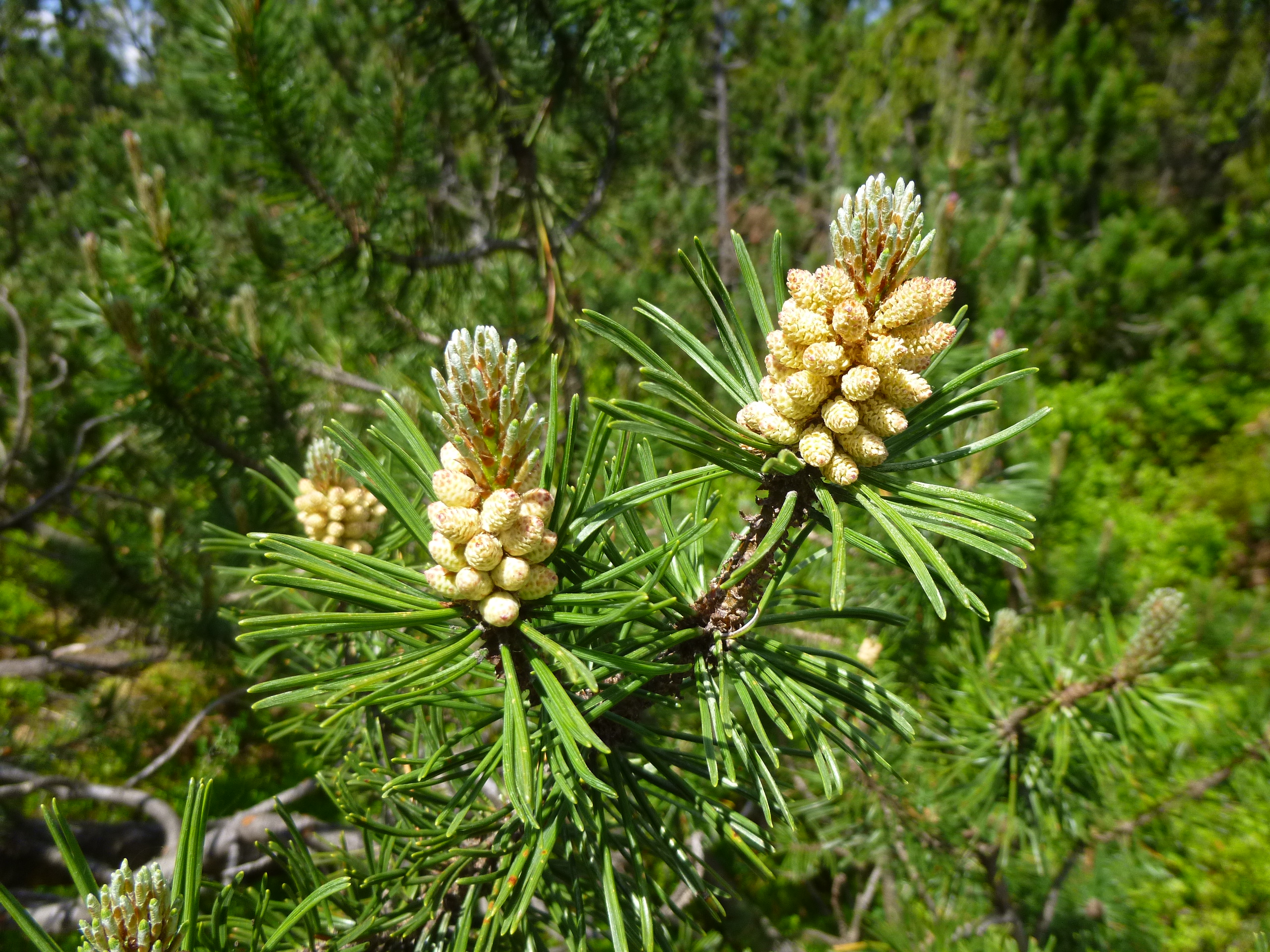
Male pollen producing strobili

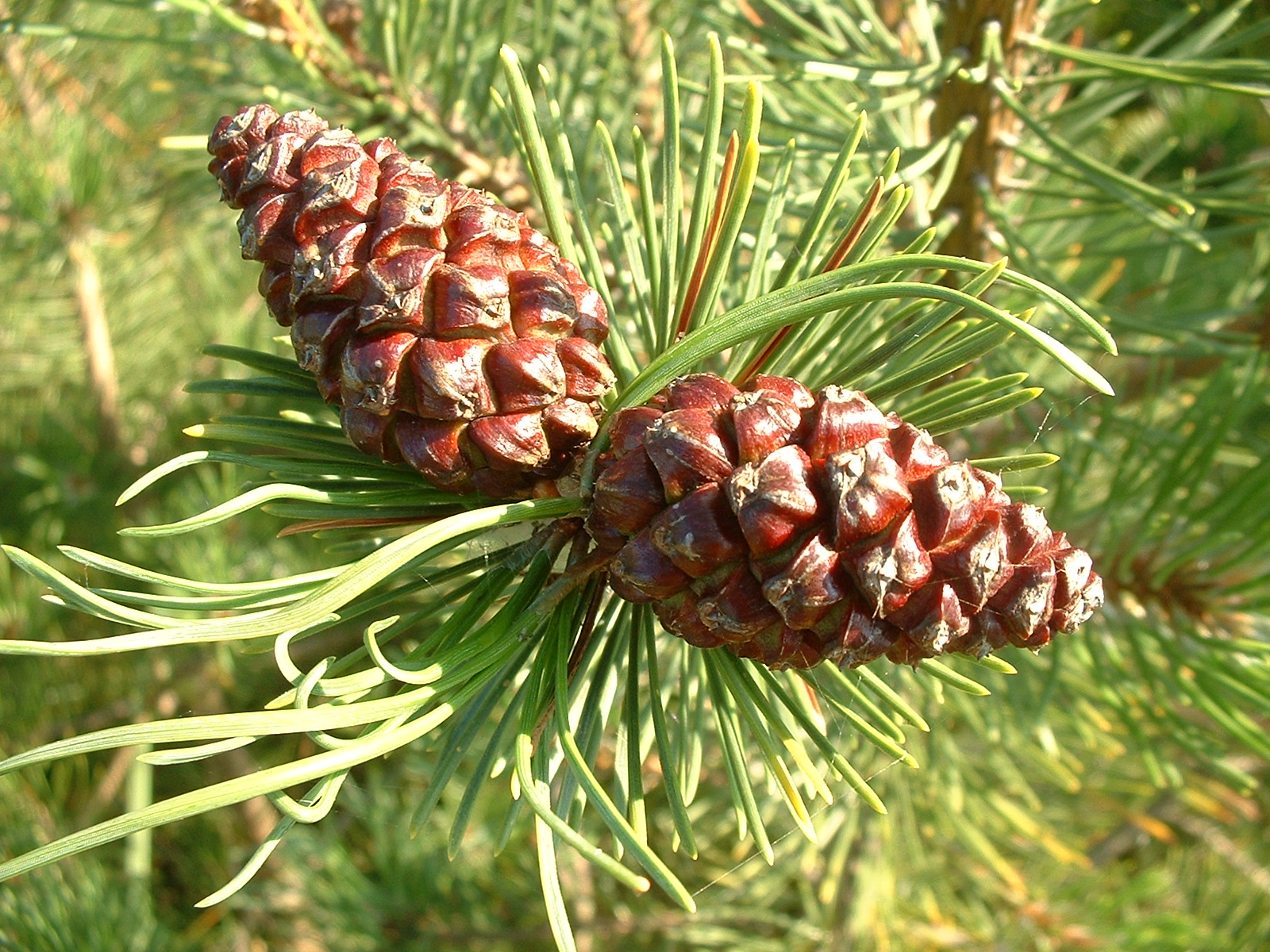
Young cones

== Sources ==
- Christensen, K.I. (1987). Taxonomic revision of the Pinus mugo complex and P. × rhaetica (P. mugo × sylvestris) (Pinaceae). Nordic J. Bot. 7: 383–408.
