= S. quadrifasciata =

S. quadrifasciata may refer to:

- Spulerina quadrifasciata, a species of moth
- Scopula quadrifasciata, a species of moth in the family Geometridae
- Serrata quadrifasciata, a species of sea snail
