= S. summa =

S. summa may refer to:

- Serrata summa, a species of sea snail
- Salvia summa, called "great sage" or "supreme sage", a plant species native to the southwestern United States and Mexico
