= Sandai Shōgun =

Notable bonsai tree

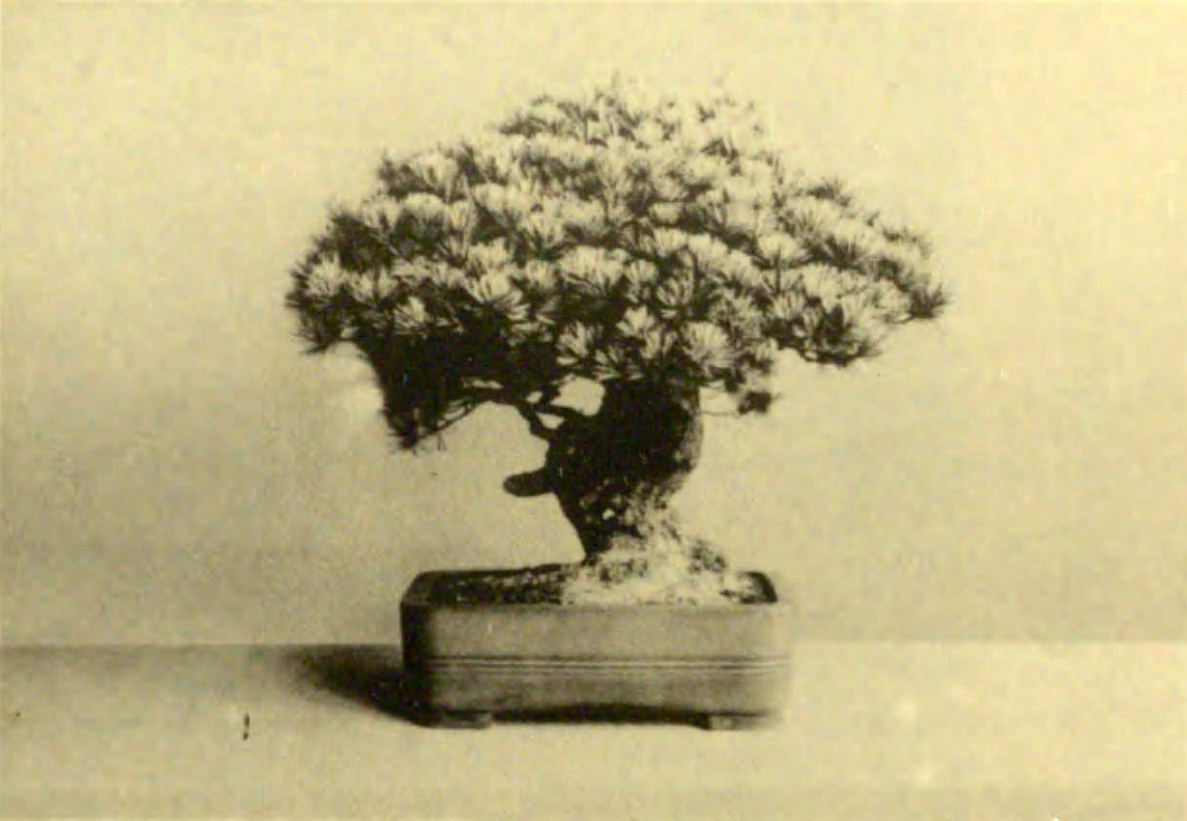
Japanese white pine, "Sandai Shōgun" (The Third Shogun), approximately 550 years old, Imperial Collection, 1938.

Sandai Shōgun (Japanese: 三代将軍 The Third Shogun) is one of the oldest-known living bonsai trees. Considered one of the National Treasures of Japan, it is in the Tokyo Imperial Palace collection. A five-needle pine (Pinus pentaphylla var. negishi) known as Sandai Shogun (三代将軍, the third shogun) is documented as having been cared for by Tokugawa Iemitsu, and is named after him. The tree is thought to be at least 500 years old. It was first trained as a bonsai by the year 1610 at latest.
