= Spulerina corticicola =

Scientific classification
- Kingdom: Animalia
- Phylum: Arthropoda
- Class: Insecta
- Order: Lepidoptera
- Family: Gracillariidae
- Genus: Spulerina
- Species: S. corticicola

Binomial name
- Spulerina corticicola Kumata, 1964

Species of moth

Spulerina corticicola is a moth of the family Gracillariidae. It is known from Japan (Hokkaidō and Honshū) and the Russian Far East.

The wingspan is 9–11.5 mm.

The larvae feed on Abies sachalinensis, Larix kaempferi, Pinus parviflora var. pentaphylla, Pinus pentaphylla and Pinus strobus. They mine the stem of their host plant.
