= Five-needle pine =

Five-needle pine is a common name for several plants and may refer to:

- Pinus parviflora, native to eastern Asia
- Pinus peuce, native to southeastern Europe
