= Spulerina astaurota =

Scientific classification
- Kingdom: Animalia
- Phylum: Arthropoda
- Class: Insecta
- Order: Lepidoptera
- Family: Gracillariidae
- Genus: Spulerina
- Species: S. astaurota

Binomial name
- Spulerina astaurota (Meyrick, 1922)

Synonyms
- Acrocercops astaurota Meyrick, 1922

Species of moth

Spulerina astaurota is a moth of the family Gracillariidae. It is known from India (Assam, Meghalaya), Japan (Kyūshū, Shikoku, Honshū), Korea and the Russian Far East.

The wingspan is 9.2-11.2 mm.

The larvae feed on Chaenomeles species, Malus domestica, Malus sieboldii, Malus sylvestris, Prunus domestica, Prunus serotina, Pyrus communis and Pyrus pyrifolia. They mine the stem of their host plant.
