= Spulerina malicola =

Scientific classification
- Kingdom: Animalia
- Phylum: Arthropoda
- Class: Insecta
- Order: Lepidoptera
- Family: Gracillariidae
- Genus: Spulerina
- Species: S. malicola

Binomial name
- Spulerina malicola (Meyrick, 1921)

Synonyms
- Acrocercops malicola Meyrick, 1921

Species of moth

Spulerina malicola is a moth of the family Gracillariidae. It is from Assam and Meghalaya, India.

The larvae feed on Malus domestica, Malus pumila, and Malus sylvestris. They probably mine the leaves or stems of their host plant.
