= Spulerina simploniella =

Bark miner

Scientific classification
- Kingdom: Animalia
- Phylum: Arthropoda
- Clade: Pancrustacea
- Class: Insecta
- Order: Lepidoptera
- Family: Gracillariidae
- Genus: Spulerina
- Species: S. simploniella

Binomial name
- Spulerina simploniella (Fischer von Röslerstamm, 1844)

Synonyms
- Ornix simploniella Schleich, 1867

Species of moth

Spulerina simploniella (bark miner) is a moth of the family Gracillariidae. It is found in Europe.

The moths fly from June to July depending on the location.

The larvae feed on the bark of oaks and birches.
