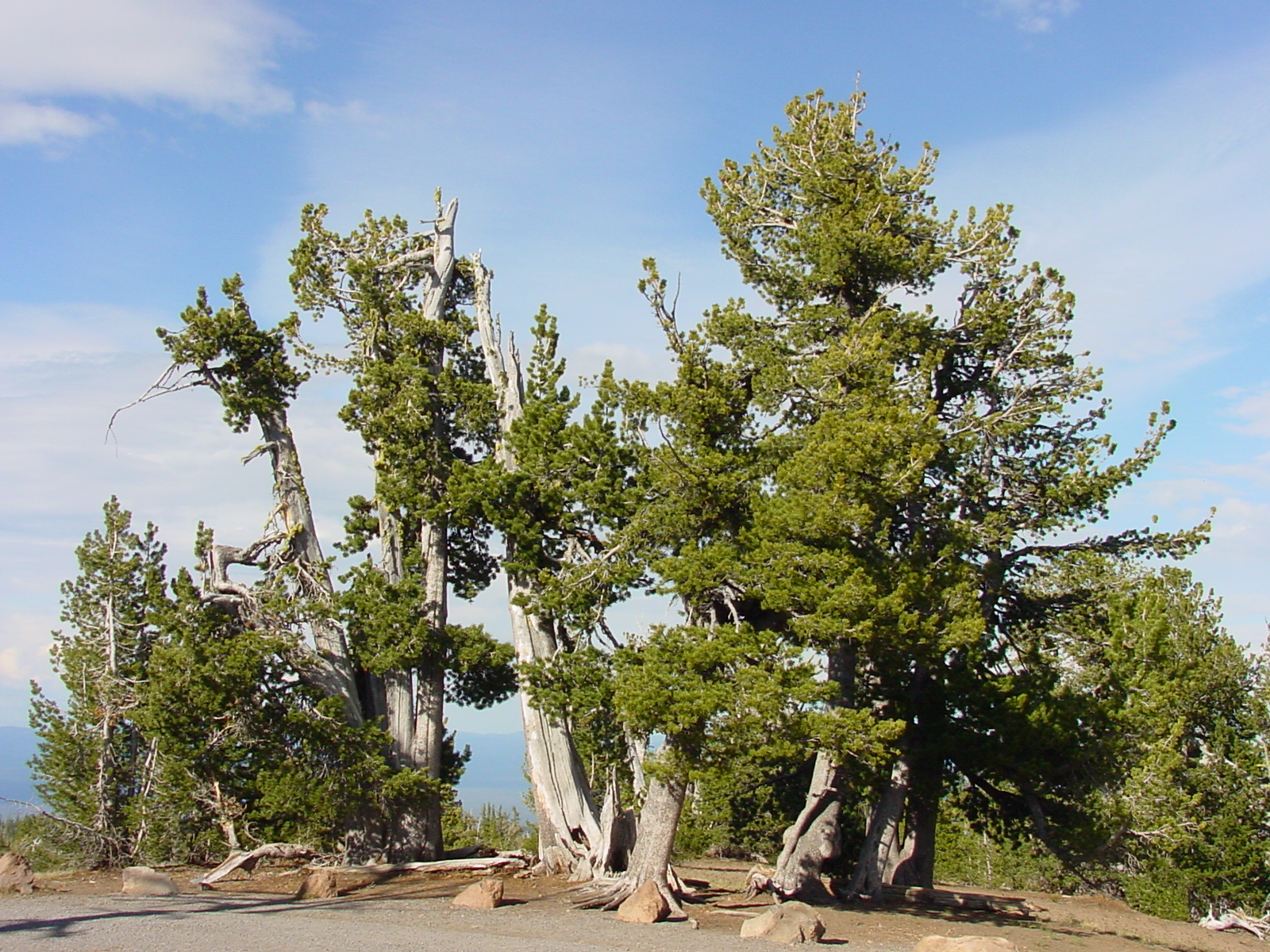
- A stand of whitebark pines at Crater Lake National Park in Oregon

Conservation status
- Endangered (IUCN 3.1)

- Vulnerable (NatureServe)

Scientific classification
- Kingdom: Plantae
- Clade: Tracheophytes
- Clade: Gymnosperms
- Division: Pinophyta
- Class: Pinopsida
- Order: Pinales
- Family: Pinaceae
- Genus: Pinus
- Subgenus: P. subg. Strobus
- Section: P. sect. Quinquefoliae
- Subsection: P. subsect. Strobus
- Species: P. albicaulis

Binomial name
- Pinus albicaulis Engelm.
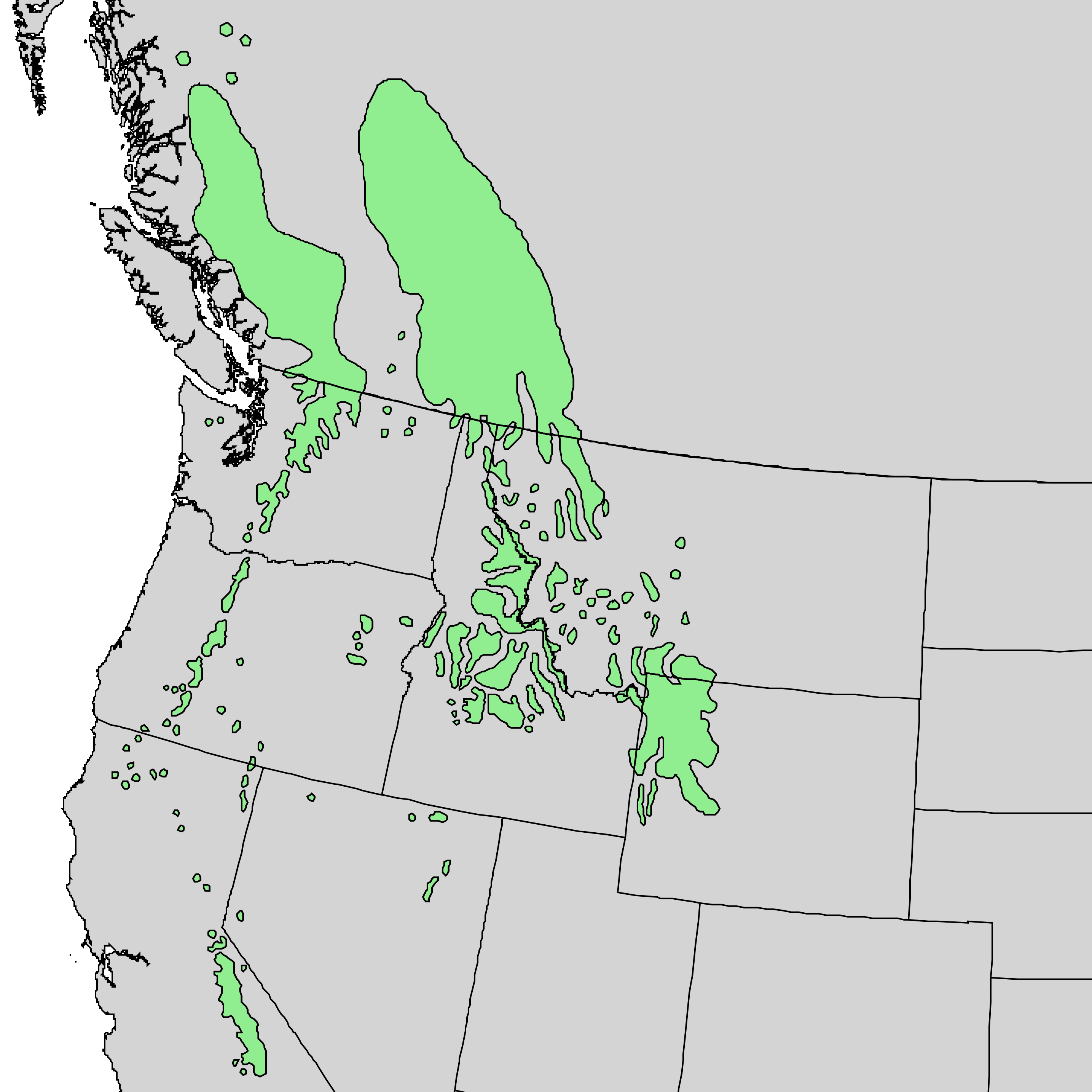
- Natural range of Pinus albicaulis

Synonyms
- Apinus albicaulis (Engelm.) Rydb.; Pinus cembroides Newb. 1857 not Zucc. 1832; Pinus flexilis var. albicaulis (Engelm.) Engelm.; Pinus flexilis subsp. albicaulis (Engelm.) Engelm.; Pinus shasta Carrière

= Pinus albicaulis =

Whitebark pine

Pine tree species found in North America

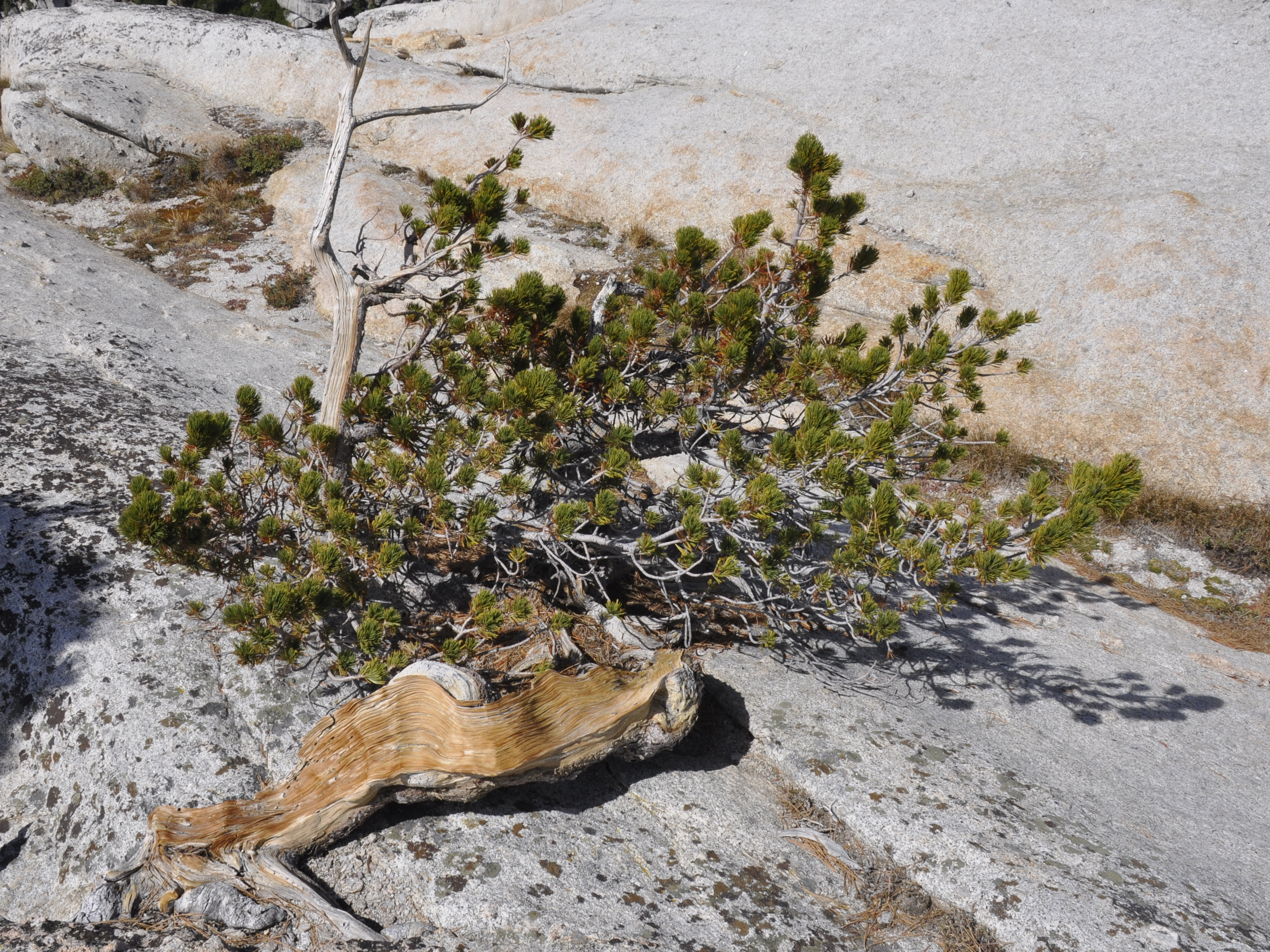
Pinus albicaulis is the only type of tree on the summit of Pywiack Dome in Yosemite National Park

Pinus albicaulis, known by the common names whitebark pine, white bark pine, white pine, pitch pine, scrub pine, and creeping pine, is a conifer tree native to the mountains of the western United States and Canada, specifically subalpine areas of the Sierra Nevada, Cascade Range, Pacific Coast Ranges, Rocky Mountains, and Ruby Mountains. It shares the common name "creeping pine" with several other plants.

The whitebark pine is typically the highest-elevation pine tree found in these mountain ranges and often marks the tree line. Thus, it is often found as krummholz, trees growing close to the ground that have been dwarfed by exposure. In more favorable conditions, the trees may grow to 29 meters (95 ft) in height.

== Identification ==
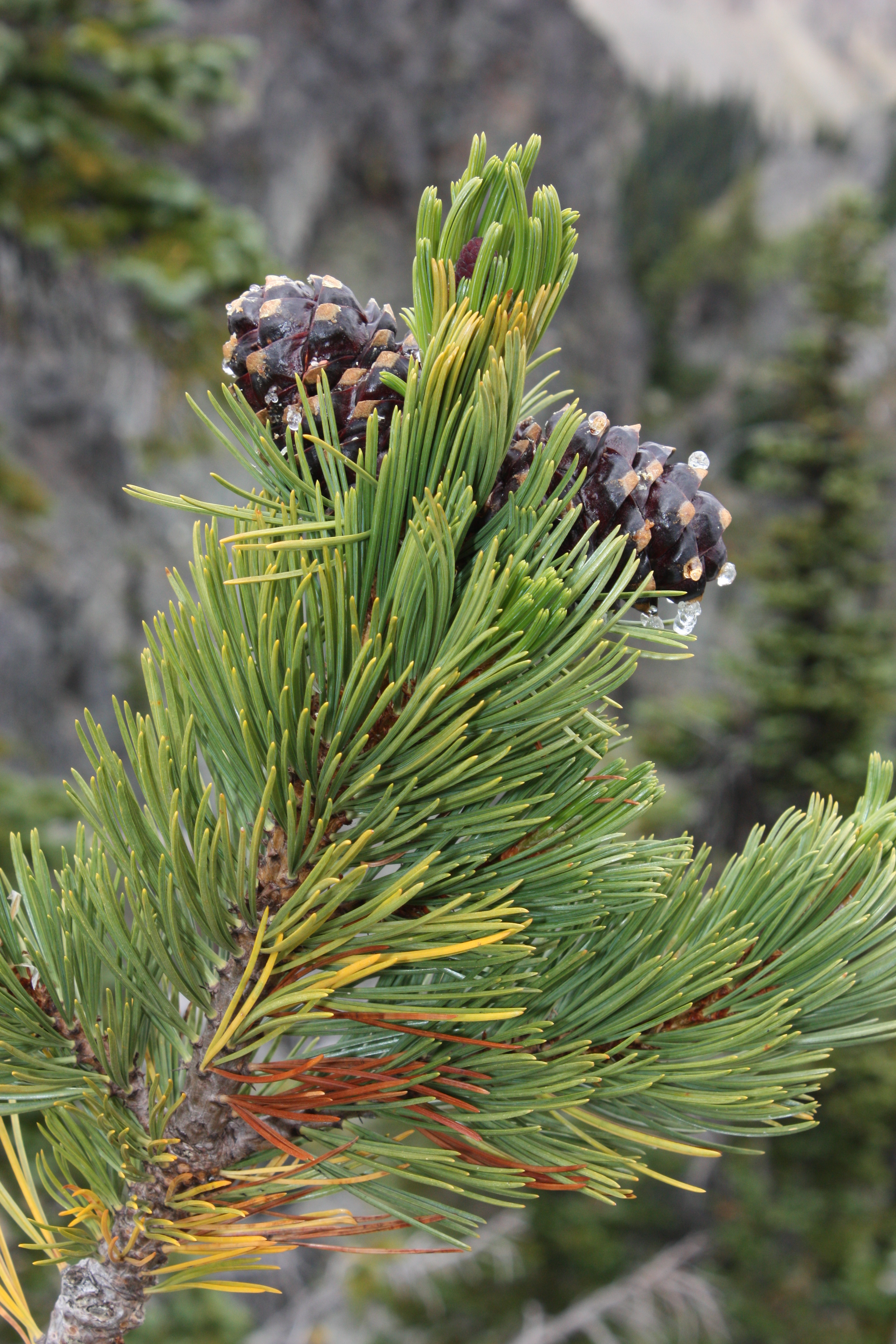
Pinus albicaulis leaves are in fascicles (bundles) of five, and the cone is dark purple when immature (Mount Rainier National Park)

Whitebark pine is a member of the white pine group, the Pinus subgenus Strobus, and the section Strobus; like all members of this group, the leaves (needles) are in fascicles (bundles) of five with a deciduous sheath. This distinguishes whitebark pine and its relatives from the lodgepole pine (Pinus contorta), with two needles per fascicle, as well as the ponderosa pine (Pinus ponderosa) and Jeffrey pine (Pinus jeffreyi), which both have three needles per fascicle; all three of these species also have a persistent sheath at the base of each fascicle. Whitebark pine owes its name to the light gray bark of its young specimens.

Distinguishing whitebark pine (Pinus albicaulis), from the related limber pine (Pinus flexilis), also a member of the white pine group, is much more difficult, and usually requires seed or pollen cones. In Pinus albicaulis, the seed-bearing female cones are 4–7 centimeters (1 1/2–3 in) long, dark purple when immature, and do not open on drying, but the scales easily break when they are removed by the Clark's nutcracker to harvest the seeds; rarely are there intact old cones in the litter beneath the trees. Its pollen cones are scarlet.

In Pinus flexilis, the cones are 6–12 cm (2 1/2–4 1/2 in) long, green when immature, and open to release the seeds; the scales are not fragile. Their pollen cones are yellow, and there are usually intact old cones found beneath them.

Whitebark pine can also be hard to distinguish from the western white pine (Pinus monticola) in the absence of cones. However, whitebark pine needles are yellow-green and entire (smooth when rubbed gently in either direction), whereas western white pine needles are silvery green and finely serrated (feeling rough when rubbed gently from tip to base). Whitebark pine needles are also usually shorter, 3–7 cm (1–3 in) long, though still overlapping in size with the larger 5–10 cm (2–4 in) needles of the western white pine.

== Distribution ==
Whitebark pine (Pinus albicaulis) can be found at high elevation in the Rocky Mountains from central British Columbia to western Wyoming. It occurs in the timberline zone of the Cascades and coastal ranges from British Columbia to the Sierra Nevada, as well as most high ranges between the Rockies and Cascades, such as the Blue Mountains. It is also populous in subalpine forests of Montana and Idaho.

== Ecology ==
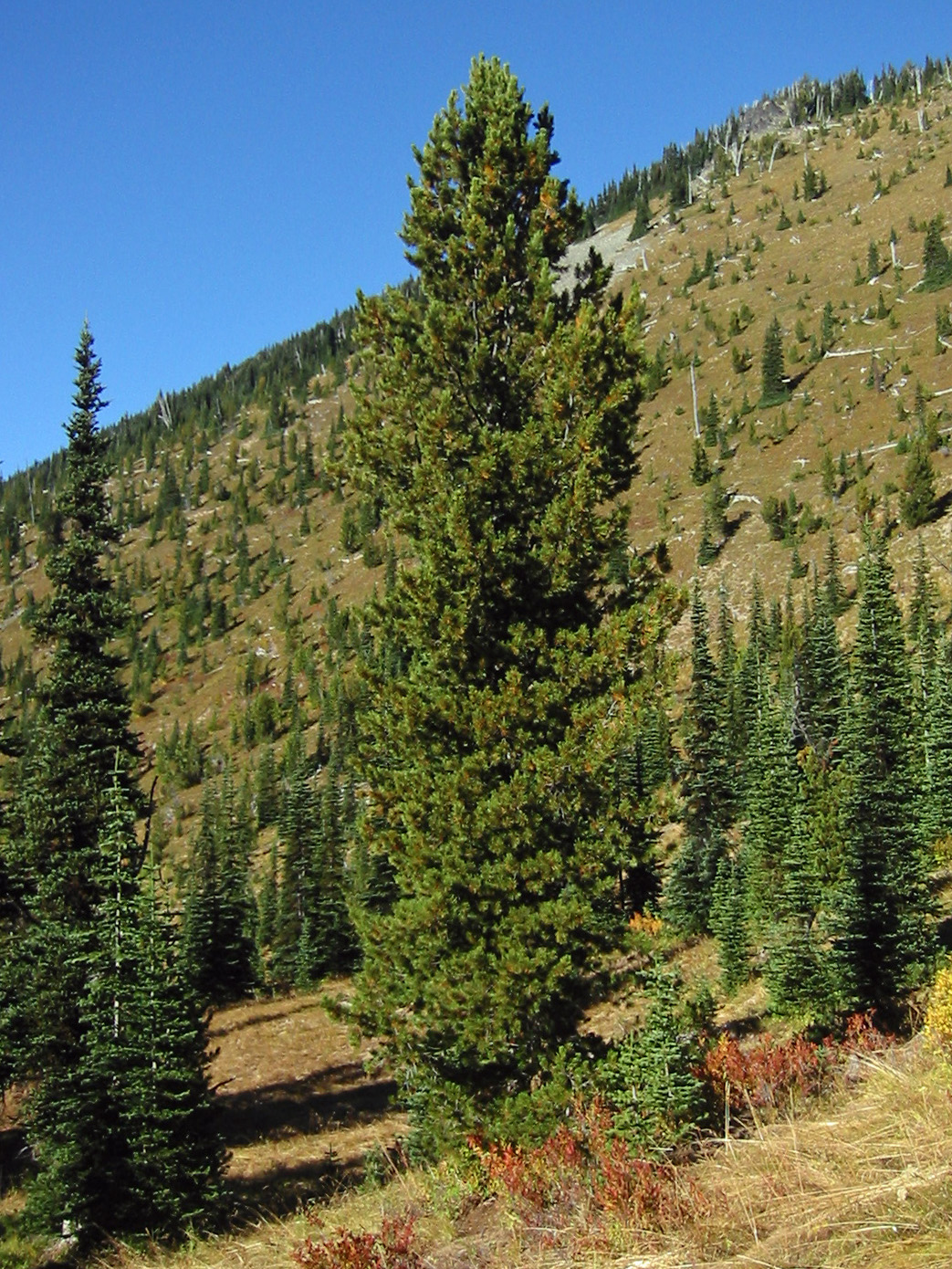
The whitebark pine, Pinus albicaulis, at Mount Rainier National Park

The whitebark pine is an important source of food for many granivorous birds and small mammals, including most importantly the Clark's nutcracker (Nucifraga columbiana), the major seed disperser of the pine. Clark's nutcrackers each cache about 30,000 to 100,000 seeds each year in small, widely scattered caches, usually under 2 to 3 cm (3/4 to 1 1/4 in) of soil or gravelly substrate. Nutcrackers retrieve these seed caches during times of food scarcity and to feed their young. Cache sites selected by nutcrackers are often favorable for germination of seeds and survival of seedlings. Those caches not retrieved by the time the snow melts contribute to forest regeneration. Consequently, whitebark pine often grows in clumps of several trees, originating from a single cache of two to 15 or more seeds.

Other animals also depend upon the whitebark pine. Douglas squirrels cut down and store whitebark pine cones in their middens. Grizzly bears and American black bears often raid squirrel middens for whitebark pine seeds, an important pre-hibernation food. Squirrels, northern flickers, and mountain bluebirds often nest in whitebark pines, and elk and blue grouse use whitebark pine communities as summer habitat.

Fallen needles under these trees serve as beds that are used by deer and wild sheep seeking shelter during stormy weather.

=== Threats ===
The whitebark pine has been classified as endangered by the IUCN. Severe population decline in whitebark pine communities is attributed to various causes, most significantly infection with white pine blister rust, recent outbreaks of mountain pine beetles (2000–2014), disturbances in wildland fire ecology (including fire suppression), forest succession, and climate change. A study in the mid-2000s showed that whitebark pine had declined by 41 percent in the western Cascades due to two primary threats: blister rust and pine beetles. Whitebark deaths in North Cascades National Park doubled from 2006 to 2011.

==== White pine blister rust ====
Many stands of Pinus albicaulis across the species' entire natural range are infected with white pine blister rust (Cronartium ribicola), a fungal disease introduced from Europe. In the northern Rocky Mountains of the United States, whitebark pine mortality in some areas exceeds 90 percent, where the disease infests nearly 143,000 acres (580 km^{2}). Cronartium ribicola occurs in whitebark pine to the northern limits of the species in the coastal ranges of British Columbia and the Canadian Rocky Mountains. The blister rust has also devastated the commercially valuable western white pine in these areas and made serious inroads in limber pine (Pinus flexilis) populations as well. Nearly 80 percent of whitebark pines in Mount Rainier National Park are infected with blister rust.

There is currently no effective method for controlling the spread and effects of blister rust. However, a small number of trees (fewer than 5%) in most populations harbor genetic resistance to blister rust. Restoration efforts undertaken by the U.S. Forest Service, Bureau of Land Management, and National Park Service in the northern Rocky Mountains involve harvesting cones from potentially and known resistant whitebark pines, growing seedlings, and outplanting seedlings in suitable sites. In California, where the blister rust is far less severe, whitebark pine is still fairly common in the High Sierras.

==== Mountain pine beetle ====
Unusually large outbreaks of mountain pine beetle (Dendroctonus ponderosae), a species of bark beetle native to western North America, have also contributed significantly to the widespread destruction of whitebark pine stands. The beetles both lay their eggs and introduce pathogenic fungi into their host trees, which include many other species of pine, and the combination of larval feeding and fungal colonization is typically sufficient to kill old or unhealthy trees. However, the beetles have recently expanded their attacks to younger, healthier trees as well as older trees, and climate change has been implicated as the primary culprit. Since 2000, the climate at high elevations has warmed enough for the beetles to reproduce within whitebark pine, often completing their life cycle within one year and enabling their populations to grow exponentially. Entire forest vistas, like that at Avalanche Ridge near Yellowstone National Park's east gate, have become expanses of dead gray whitebarks. Scientists have attributed the recent warming trend to anthropogenic global warming.

In 2007, the U.S. Fish and Wildlife Service estimated that beetles had killed whitebark pines across 500,000 acres (200,000 ha) in the West, while in 2009, beetles were estimated to have killed trees on 800,000 acres (320,000 ha), the most since record-keeping began. The pine beetle upsurge has killed nearly 750,000 whitebark pines in the Greater Yellowstone Ecosystem alone.

==== Fire suppression ====
Fire suppression has led to slow population declines over the last century by altering the health and composition dynamics of stands without the fire ecology balancing their habitat and suppressing insect-disease threats. In the absence of low-level wildfire cycles, whitebark pines in these stands are replaced by more shade-tolerant, fire-intolerant species such as subalpine fir (Abies lasiocarpa) and Engelmann spruce (Picea engelmannii). In addition, senescent and blister rust-infected pine trees are not destroyed by natural periodic ground fires, further diminishing the whitebark pine forest's vitality and survival.

=== Protective efforts ===
In 2012 the Canadian federal government declared whitebark pine endangered in accordance with the Species at Risk Act. Accordingly, it became the first federally listed endangered tree in western Canada. In 2022 the U.S. Fish & Wildlife Service also acted. It listed whitebark pine in the lowest category of vulnerability: "threatened." Four distinct threats were described, beginning with white pine blister rust as "the primary stressor." Mountain pine beetle, altered fire regimes, and "the effects of climate change" add to the challenges. This listing marks the first occasion in which a tree regarded as ecologically important over a vast range in the United States is acknowledged as vulnerable to extinction.

In response to the ongoing decline of the tree throughout its range, the Whitebark Pine Ecosystem Foundation was formed. Their mission is to raise awareness and promote conservation by sponsoring restoration projects, publishing a newsletter called "Nutcracker Notes", and hosting an annual science and management workshop for anyone interested in whitebark pine. This U.S. group collaborates closely with the Whitebark Pine Ecosystem Foundation of Canada.

== Uses ==
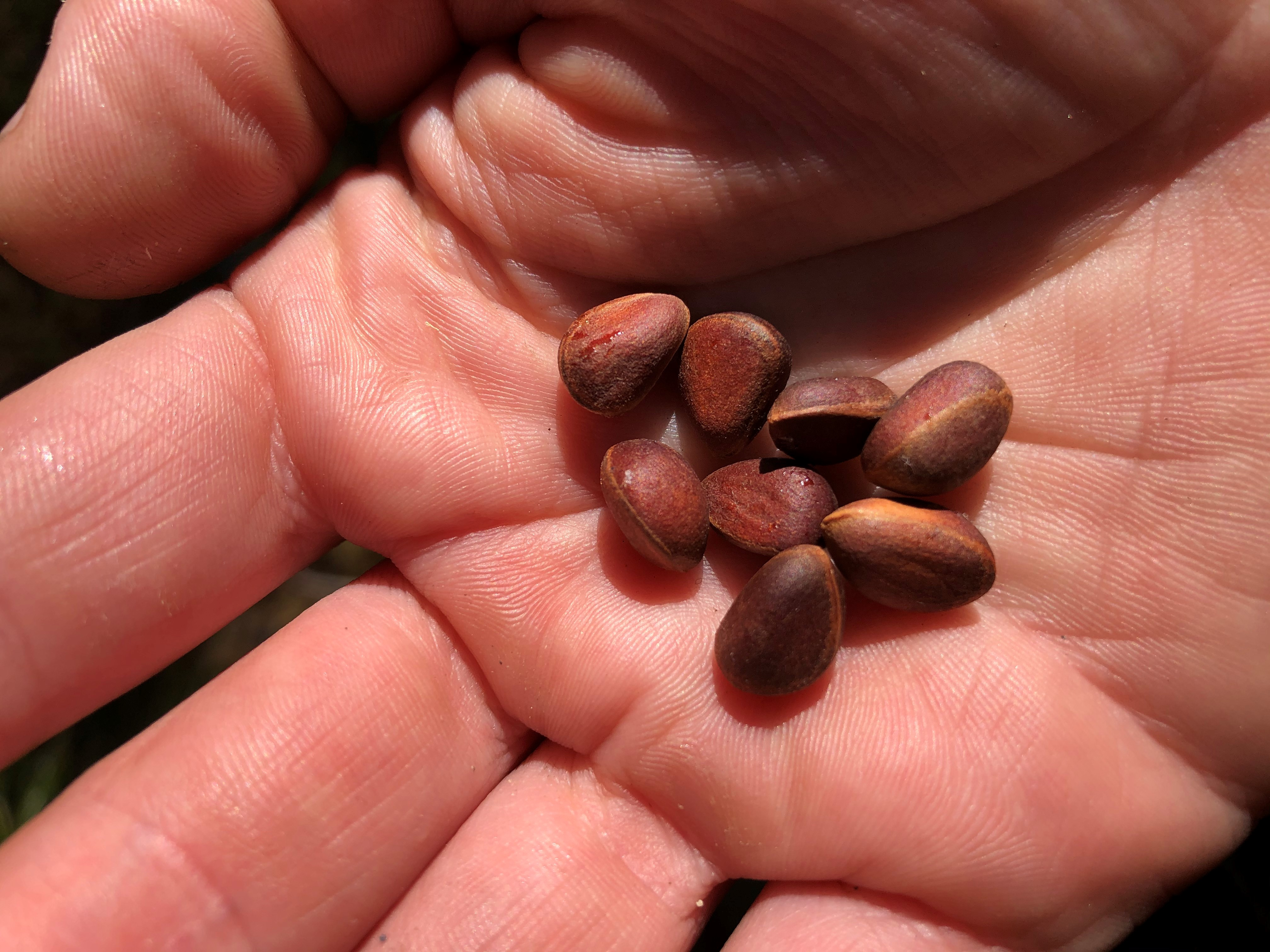
Whitebark pine seeds

Interior Salish peoples harvested seeds from this tree's cones for food. They were roasted, made into porridge, and mixed with dry berries.

Whitebark pine plays a key hydrological role in the ecosystem by regulating runoff, enhancing and retaining snowpack, and reducing soil erosion. Habitat loss due to climate change could lead to downstream flooding and increased soil erosion, impacting agriculture, ranching, and drinking water supply.
