= Spulerina virgulata =

Scientific classification
- Kingdom: Animalia
- Phylum: Arthropoda
- Class: Insecta
- Order: Lepidoptera
- Family: Gracillariidae
- Genus: Spulerina
- Species: S. virgulata

Binomial name
- Spulerina virgulata Kumata & Kuroko, 1988

Species of moth

Spulerina virgulata is a moth of the family Gracillariidae. It is known from Honshū island of Japan.

The wingspan is 7–9 mm.

The larvae feed on Quercus acutissima, Quercus serrata and Quercus variabilis. They mine the stem of their host plant.
