= Spulerina atactodesma =

Scientific classification
- Domain: Eukaryota
- Kingdom: Animalia
- Phylum: Arthropoda
- Class: Insecta
- Order: Lepidoptera
- Family: Gracillariidae
- Genus: Spulerina
- Species: S. atactodesma

Binomial name
- Spulerina atactodesma Vári, 1961

Species of moth

Spulerina atactodesma is a moth of the family Gracillariidae. It is known from South Africa.
