= Spulerina castaneae =

Scientific classification
- Kingdom: Animalia
- Phylum: Arthropoda
- Class: Insecta
- Order: Lepidoptera
- Family: Gracillariidae
- Genus: Spulerina
- Species: S. castaneae

Binomial name
- Spulerina castaneae Kumata & Kuroko, 1988

Species of moth

Spulerina castaneae is a moth of the family Gracillariidae. It is known from Japan (Honshū) and the Russian Far East.

The wingspan is 8.5–9 mm.

The larvae feed on Quercus species and Castanea crenata. They mine the stem of their host plant.
