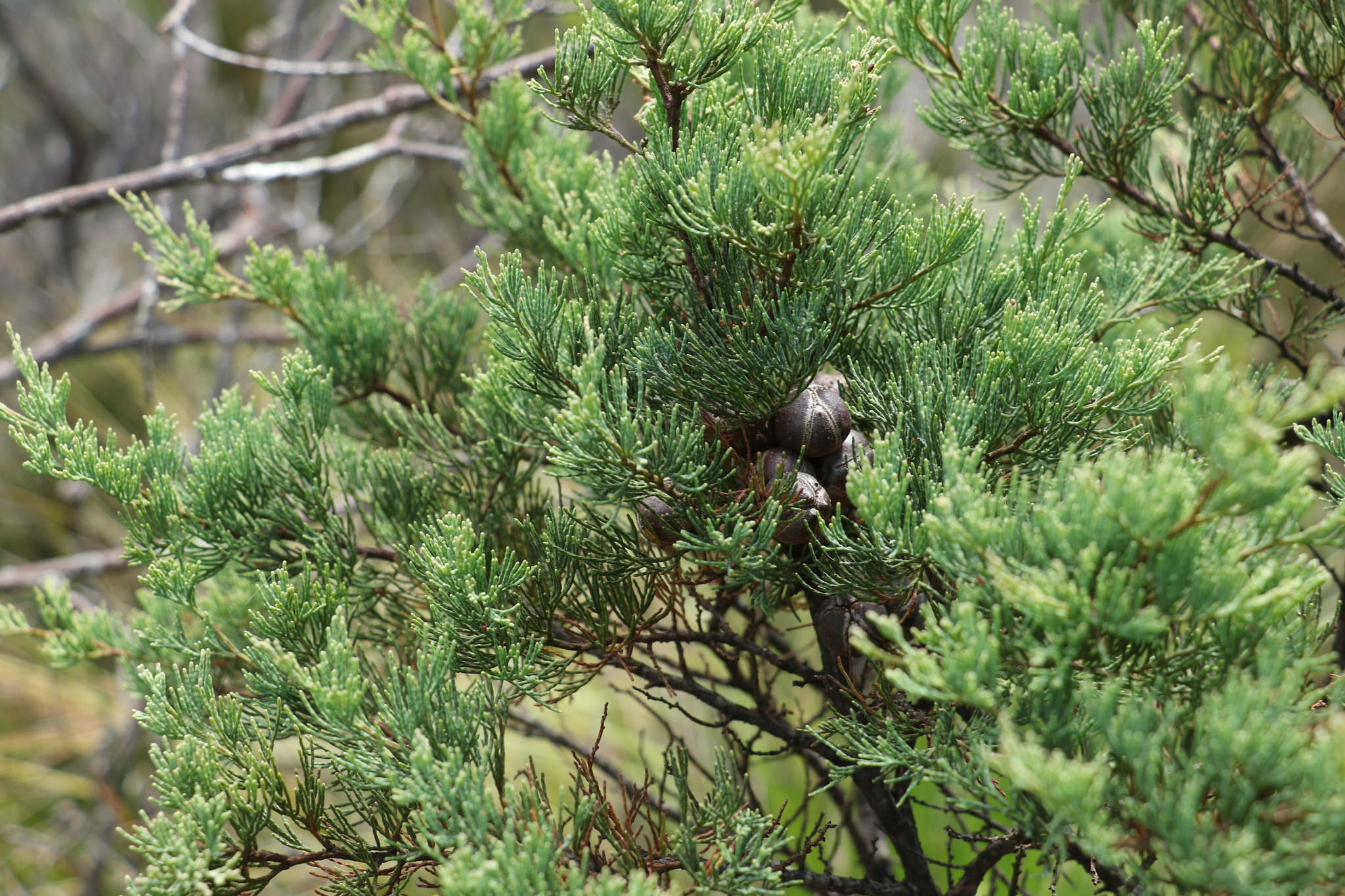

Conservation status
- Vulnerable (IUCN 3.1)

Scientific classification
- Kingdom: Plantae
- Clade: Tracheophytes
- Clade: Gymnosperms
- Division: Pinophyta
- Class: Pinopsida
- Order: Cupressales
- Family: Cupressaceae
- Genus: Callitris
- Species: C. monticola

Binomial name
- Callitris monticola J.Garden

= Callitris monticola =

Species of conifer

Callitris monticola, the steelhead or dwarf cypress (a name it shares with several other conifers), is a species of conifer in the cypress family, Cupressaceae. It is found only in Australia, occurring in the states of Queensland and New South Wales and is considered vulnerable due to its restricted distribution.

== Description ==
Callitris monticola is an erect coniferous shrub growing to 2.5 meters tall. The leaves are glaucous and measure 2-4 millimeters long. This species is monoecious, with female cones occurring solitarily or in clusters. The cones are egg shaped to spherical, measuring 15-20 millimeters in diameter, with each scale having a dorsal protuberance near the apex of the cone.
