= Spulerina marmarodes =

Scientific classification
- Kingdom: Animalia
- Phylum: Arthropoda
- Class: Insecta
- Order: Lepidoptera
- Family: Gracillariidae
- Genus: Spulerina
- Species: S. marmarodes

Binomial name
- Spulerina marmarodes Vári, 1961

Species of moth

Spulerina marmarodes is a moth of the family Gracillariidae. It is known from South Africa.
