= Spulerina =

Scientific classification
- Kingdom: Animalia
- Phylum: Arthropoda
- Class: Insecta
- Order: Lepidoptera
- Family: Gracillariidae
- Subfamily: Acrocercopinae
- Genus: Spulerina; Vári, 1961

Species
- See text

Genus of moths

Spulerina is a genus of moths in the family Gracillariidae.

== Species ==
- Spulerina aphanosema Vári, 1961
- Spulerina astaurota (Meyrick, 1922)
- Spulerina atactodesma Vári, 1961
- Spulerina castaneae Kumata & Kuroko, 1988
- Spulerina catapasta Vári, 1961
- Spulerina corticicola Kumata, 1964
- Spulerina dissotoma (Meyrick, 1931)
- Spulerina hexalocha (Meyrick, 1912)
- Spulerina isonoma (Meyrick, 1916)
- Spulerina lochmaea Vári, 1961
- Spulerina malicola (Meyrick, 1921)
- Spulerina marmarodes Vári, 1961
- Spulerina parthenocissi Kumata & Kuroko, 1988
- Spulerina quadrifasciata Bland, 1980
- Spulerina simploniella (Fischer von Röslerstamm, 1840)
- Spulerina virgulata Kumata & Kuroko, 1988
