= Spulerina hexalocha =

Scientific classification
- Kingdom: Animalia
- Phylum: Arthropoda
- Class: Insecta
- Order: Lepidoptera
- Family: Gracillariidae
- Genus: Spulerina
- Species: S. hexalocha

Binomial name
- Spulerina hexalocha (Meyrick, 1912)

Synonyms
- Acrocercops hexalocha Meyrick, 1912

Species of moth

Spulerina hexalocha is a moth of the family Gracillariidae. It is known from Reunion, Sierra Leone and South Africa.

The larvae feed on Sclerocarya birrea and Sclerocarya afra. They probably mine the leaves of their host plant.
