= Spulerina isonoma =

Scientific classification
- Kingdom: Animalia
- Phylum: Arthropoda
- Class: Insecta
- Order: Lepidoptera
- Family: Gracillariidae
- Genus: Spulerina
- Species: S. isonoma

Binomial name
- Spulerina isonoma (Meyrick, 1916)

Synonyms
- Acrocercops isonoma Meyrick, 1916

Species of moth

Spulerina isonoma is a moth of the family Gracillariidae. It is known from India (Bihar), Malaysia and Thailand.

The larvae feed on Mangifera indica. They probably mine the leaves or stems of their host plant.
