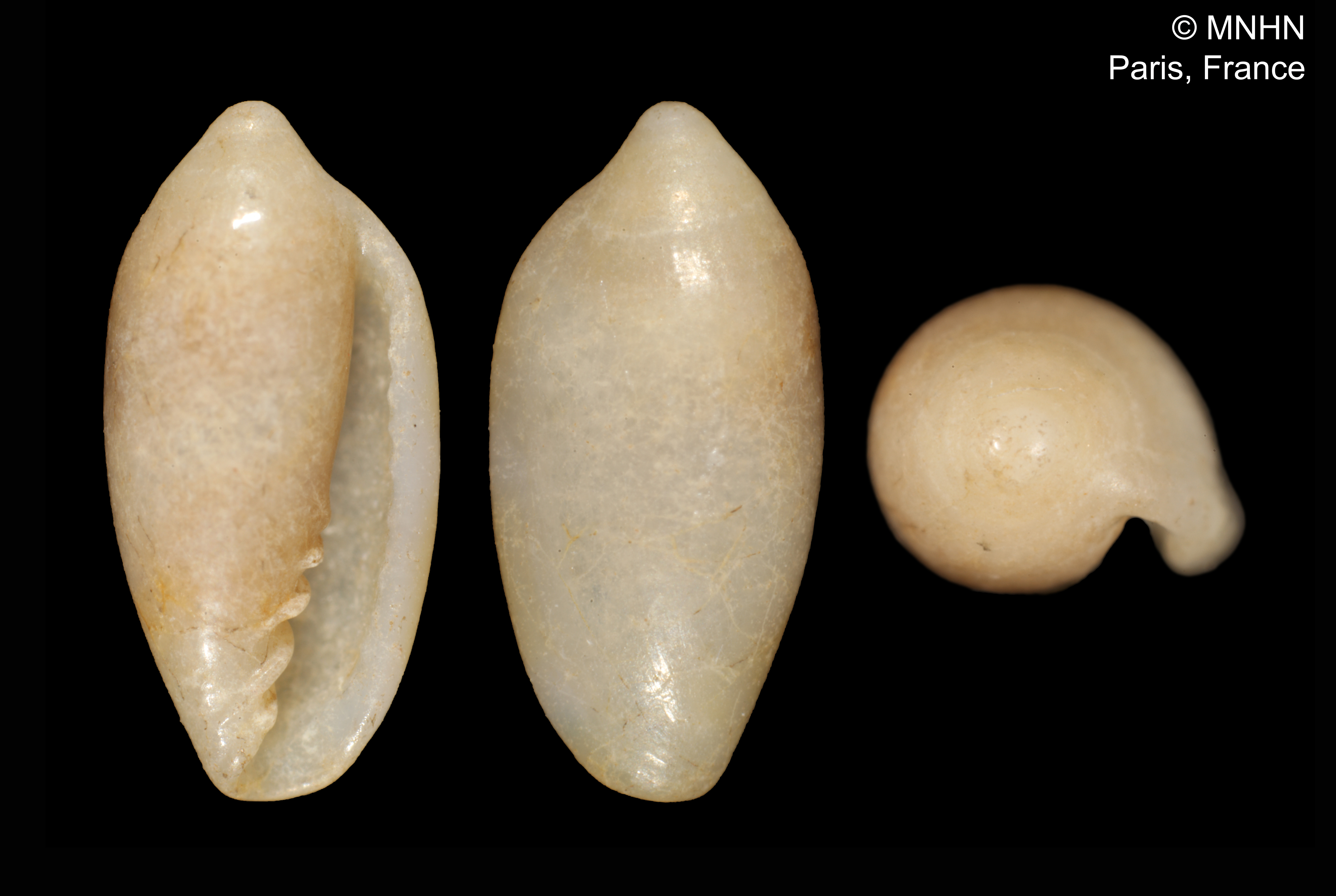
- Shell of Serrata summa (holotype at MNHN, Paris)

Scientific classification
- Kingdom: Animalia
- Phylum: Mollusca
- Class: Gastropoda
- Subclass: Caenogastropoda
- Order: Neogastropoda
- Family: Marginellidae
- Genus: Serrata
- Species: S. summa

Binomial name
- Serrata summa Boyer, 2008

= Serrata summa =

Species of gastropod

Serrata summa is a species of sea snail, a marine gastropod mollusc in the family Marginellidae, the margin snails.

The name comes from the Latin summus, similar to the English summit, referring to where the species was found, which was on the crest of a seamount.

== Description ==
The length of the shell attains 4.4 mm.

The shell is slender, solid, and opaque. It has a short spire and a narrow aperture. Its dimensions are approximately 4.4 x 2.05 millimeters.

== Distribution ==
This marine species occurs off New Caledonia (depth range 266–267 m.). It has been found in the locality of Norfolk Ridge.

== Similar species ==
- Serrata quadrifasciata
- Serrata pupoides
