= Spulerina dissotoma =

Scientific classification
- Kingdom: Animalia
- Phylum: Arthropoda
- Class: Insecta
- Order: Lepidoptera
- Family: Gracillariidae
- Genus: Spulerina
- Species: S. dissotoma

Binomial name
- Spulerina dissotoma (Meyrick, 1931)

Synonyms
- Acrocercops dissotoma Meyrick, 1931; Spulerina lespedezifoliella Kuroko, 1982

Species of moth

Spulerina dissotoma is a moth of the family Gracillariidae. It is known from India (Bihar), Japan (Honshū, Kyūshū, Shikoku, Tusima, Hokkaidō and the Ryukyu Islands), Korea, the Russian Far East and Taiwan.

The wingspan is 5.8-7.6 mm.

The larvae feed on Flemingia lineata, Lespedeza bicolor, Lespedeza cyrtobotrya and Pueraria montana. They mine the leaves of their host plant.
