= Dwarf cypress =

Dwarf cypress is a common name used for several plants in the conifer family Cupressaceae (cypress family)

Dwarf cypress may refer to:

- Actinostrobus acuminatus
- Callitris monticola
- Small cultivars of Chamaecyparis are known in horticulture as miniature or dwarf cypress.
- Taxodium ascendens - Pond cypress growing with limited nutrients forms dwarf cypress savannah in the Everglades National Park in Florida.
- Lepidothamnus fonkii – a species of conifer in the family Podocarpaceae found in Argentina and Chile.
