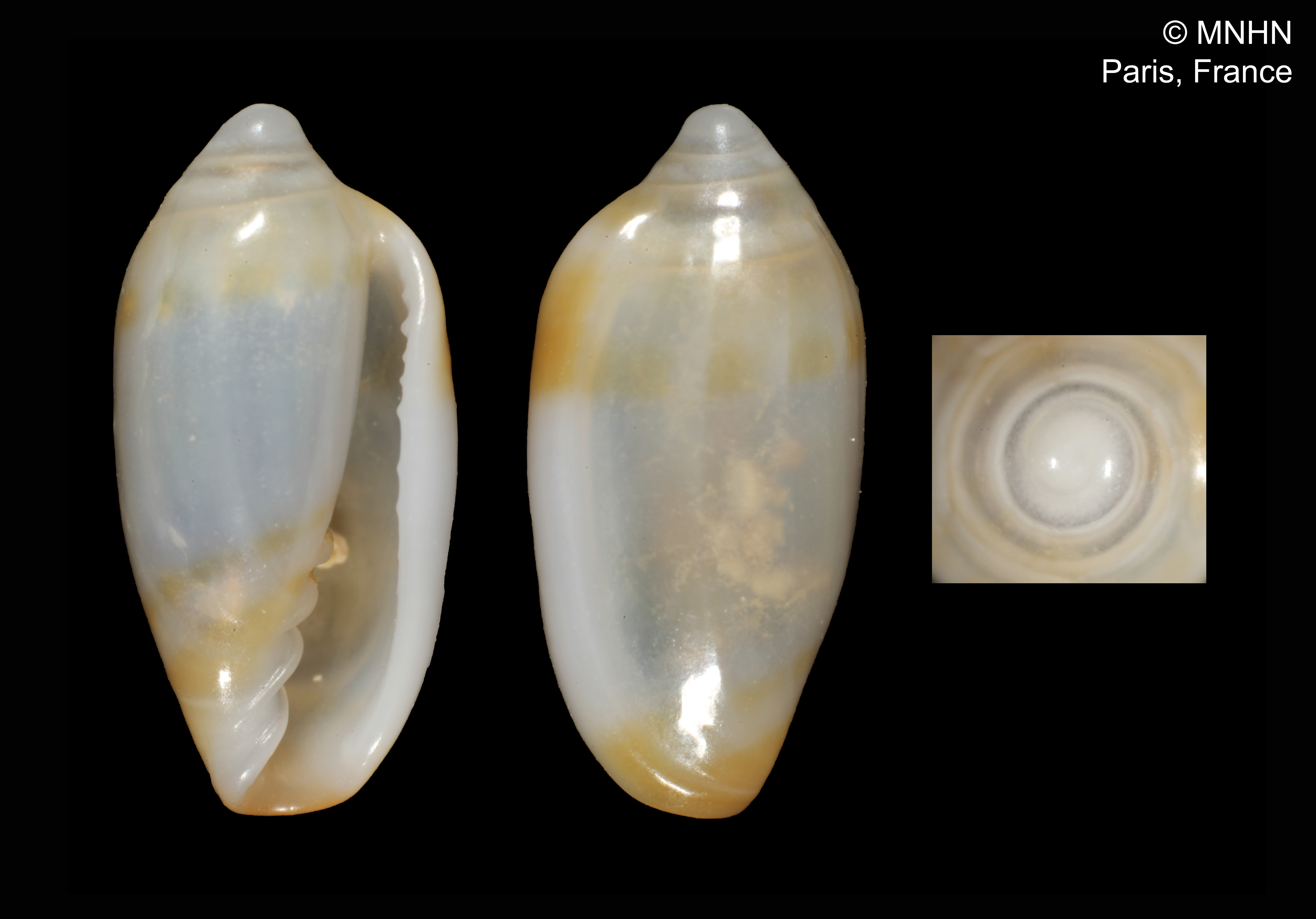
- Shell of Serrata quadrifasciata (holotype at MNHN, Paris)

Scientific classification
- Kingdom: Animalia
- Phylum: Mollusca
- Class: Gastropoda
- Subclass: Caenogastropoda
- Order: Neogastropoda
- Family: Marginellidae
- Genus: Serrata
- Species: S. quadrifasciata

Binomial name
- Serrata quadrifasciata Boyer, 2008

= Serrata quadrifasciata =

Species of gastropod

Serrata quadrifasciata is a species of sea snail, a marine gastropod mollusc in the family Marginellidae, the margin snails.

== Description ==
The length of the shell attains 5.15 mm.

The shell is slender, cylindrical, solid, and subtranslucent. It has a short and pointed spire. Its aperture is long and narrow. It has a number of small denticles. Its dimensions are about 5.15 by 2.60 millimeters.

Is considered by Boyer to be a paratype.

Its shell is decorated by a number of large spiral bands of a different color.

== Distribution ==
This marine species occurs off New Caledonia (depth range: 350-358 m).

== Similar species ==
- Serrata pupoides
- Serrata summa
