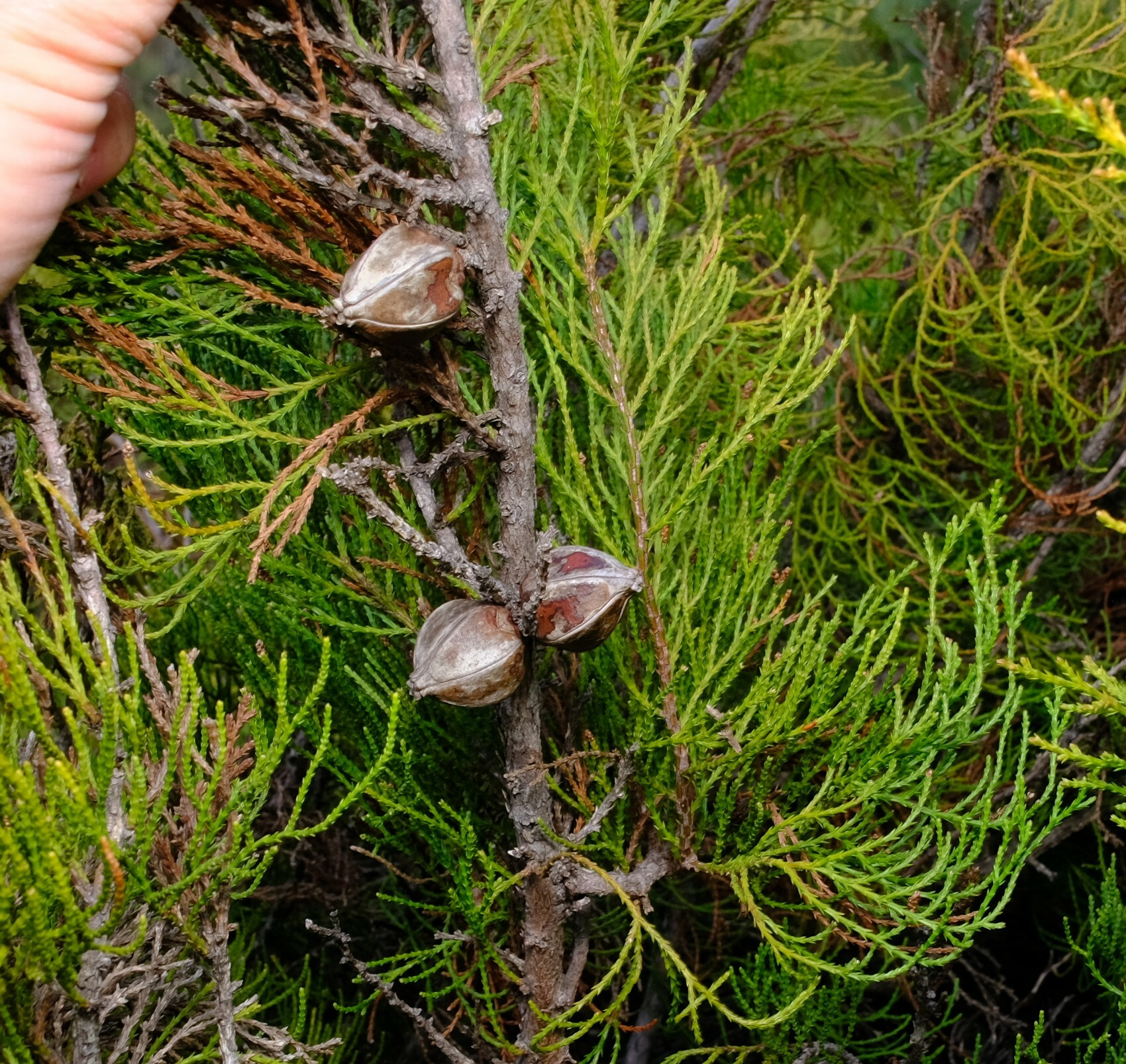

Conservation status
- Near Threatened (IUCN 3.1)

Scientific classification
- Kingdom: Plantae
- Clade: Tracheophytes
- Clade: Gymnosperms
- Division: Pinophyta
- Class: Pinopsida
- Order: Cupressales
- Family: Cupressaceae
- Genus: Callitris
- Species: C. acuminata

Binomial name
- Callitris acuminata (Parl.) F.Muell.

Synonyms
- Actinostrobus acuminatus Parl.; Actinostrobus acuminatus subsp. psammophilus Silba

= Callitris acuminata =

Species of plant

Callitris acuminata (synonym Actinostrobus acuminatus), commonly known as dwarf cypress, creeping pine or Moore cypress pine, is a species of coniferous tree in the cypress family, Cupressaceae. It is endemic to southwestern Western Australia, where it can be found along the shorelines of rivers. The Mount Henry Peninsula is an example of the environment in which this cypress is found. It shares the common name dwarf cypress with several other plants, and shares the name creeping pine with others.

It is a shrub or small tree, reaching 1–4.5 m tall. The leaves are mixed scale-like and needle-like, except on young seedlings, where they are all needle-like. The leaves are arranged in six rows along the twigs, in alternating whorls of three; the scale leaves are 2–4 mm long, the needle leaves 10–20 mm long. The male cones are small, 3–6 mm long, and are located at the tips of the twigs. The female cones start out similarly inconspicuous, but mature in 18–20 months to 15–20 mm long, with a pointed apex.
