= Creeping pine =

Creeping pine may refer to several conifer species:

- Actinostrobus acuminatus, Australian, in family Cupressaceae
- Pinus albicaulis, North American, in family Pinaceae
- Pinus mugo, native to high places in Central Europe, in family Pinaceae
- Pinus pumila, Asian, in family Pinaceae
- Microcachrys, Australian, in family Podocarpaceae

== See also ==
- Ground pine or Lycopodium
- Creeping juniper or Juniperus horizontalis
- Creeping spruce, a cultivar of Picea abies
