= Spulerina lochmaea =

Scientific classification
- Kingdom: Animalia
- Phylum: Arthropoda
- Class: Insecta
- Order: Lepidoptera
- Family: Gracillariidae
- Genus: Spulerina
- Species: S. lochmaea

Binomial name
- Spulerina lochmaea Vári, 1961

Species of moth

Spulerina lochmaea is a moth of the family Gracillariidae. It is known from South Africa.

The larvae feed on Mangifera indica., they mine the leaves of their host plant.

S. lochmea was first described from a female specimen found at Mariepskop in South Africa. The moths have white heads and brown-grey antennae with white and pale grey undersides. Their abdomens are also brown-grey above and white below; the thorax is "whitish". Their hindwings and cilia are also grey-brown but their forewings are ochre brown with black-edged white layers of tissue. The holotype was 8 mm long.
