= Spulerina parthenocissi =

Scientific classification
- Kingdom: Animalia
- Phylum: Arthropoda
- Clade: Pancrustacea
- Class: Insecta
- Order: Lepidoptera
- Family: Gracillariidae
- Genus: Spulerina
- Species: S. parthenocissi

Binomial name
- Spulerina parthenocissi Kumata & Kuroko, 1988

Species of moth

Spulerina parthenocissi is a moth of the family Gracillariidae. It is known from the islands of Hokkaidō, Honshū and Shikoku in Japan.

The wingspan is 6–8 mm.

The larvae feed on Parthenocissus tricuspidata. They mine the leaves of their host plant.
