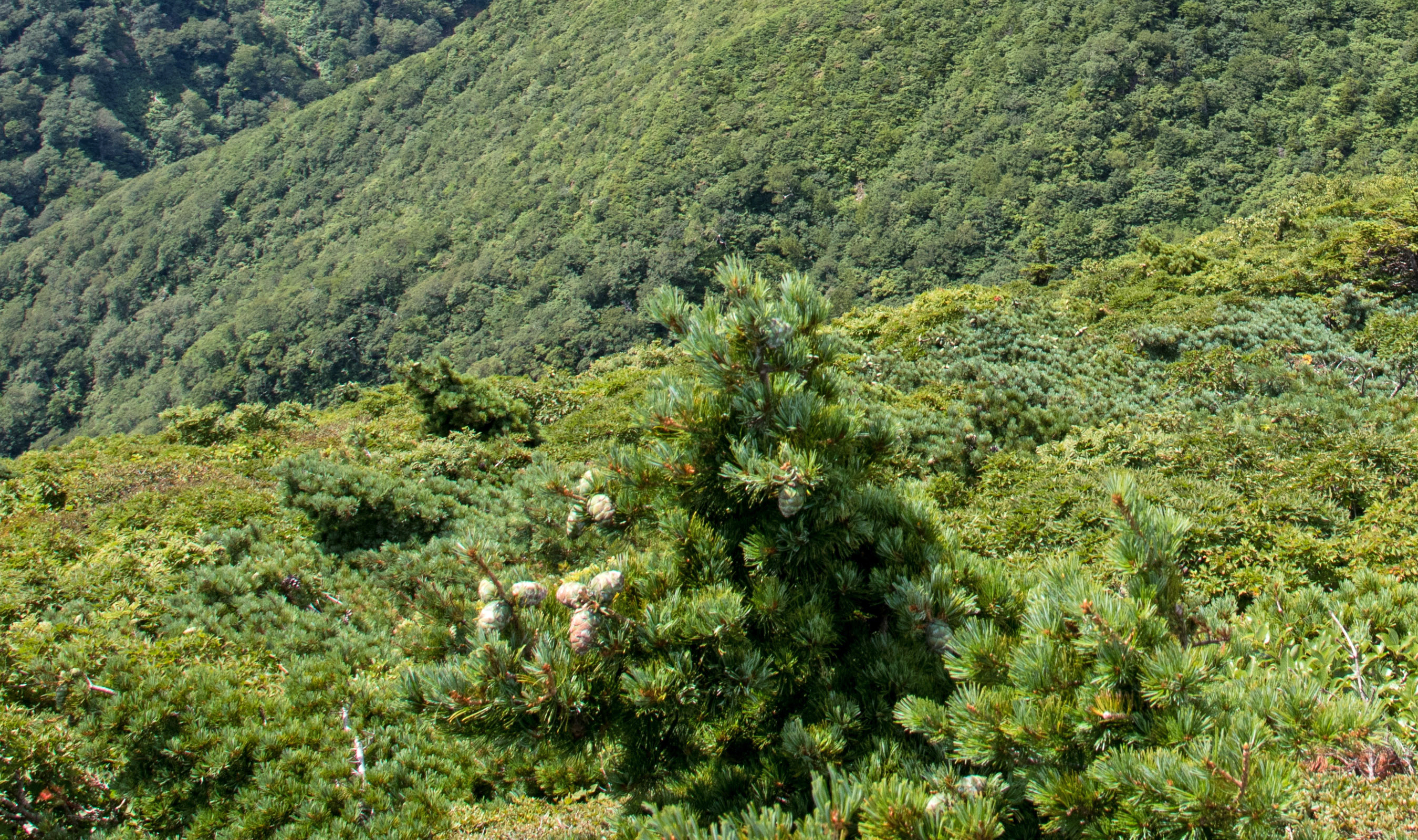

Conservation status
- Least Concern (IUCN 2.3)

Scientific classification
- Kingdom: Plantae
- Clade: Tracheophytes
- Clade: Gymnospermae
- Division: Pinophyta
- Class: Pinopsida
- Order: Pinales
- Family: Pinaceae
- Genus: Pinus
- Subgenus: P. subg. Strobus
- Section: P. sect. Quinquefoliae
- Subsection: P. subsect. Strobus
- Species: P. × hakkodensis

Binomial name
- Pinus × hakkodensis Makino

= Pinus × hakkodensis =

Species of conifer

Pinus × hakkodensis, the Hakkōda pine, is a nothospecies of conifer in the family Pinaceae. It is found only in Japan. It is a natural hybrid between Pinus pumila and Pinus parviflora.

== Bibliography ==
- Conifer Specialist Group 1998. Pinus hakkodensis. 2006 IUCN Red List of Threatened Species. Downloaded on 10 July 2007.
