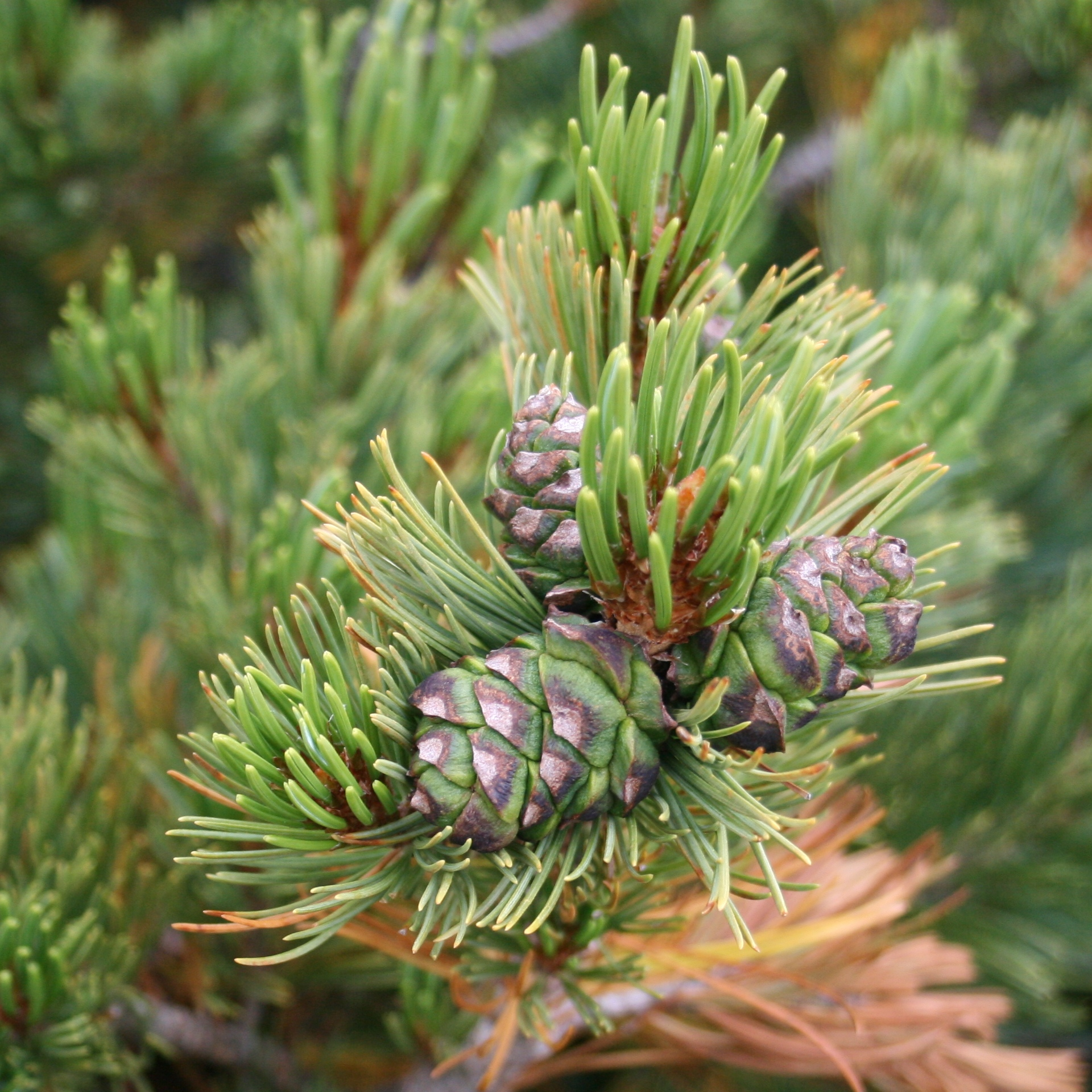
- Foliage and female cones

Conservation status
- Least Concern (IUCN 3.1)

Scientific classification
- Kingdom: Plantae
- Clade: Tracheophytes
- Clade: Gymnosperms
- Division: Pinophyta
- Class: Pinopsida
- Order: Pinales
- Family: Pinaceae
- Genus: Pinus
- Subgenus: P. subg. Strobus
- Section: P. sect. Quinquefoliae
- Subsection: P. subsect. Strobus
- Species: P. pumila

Binomial name
- Pinus pumila (Pall.) Regel
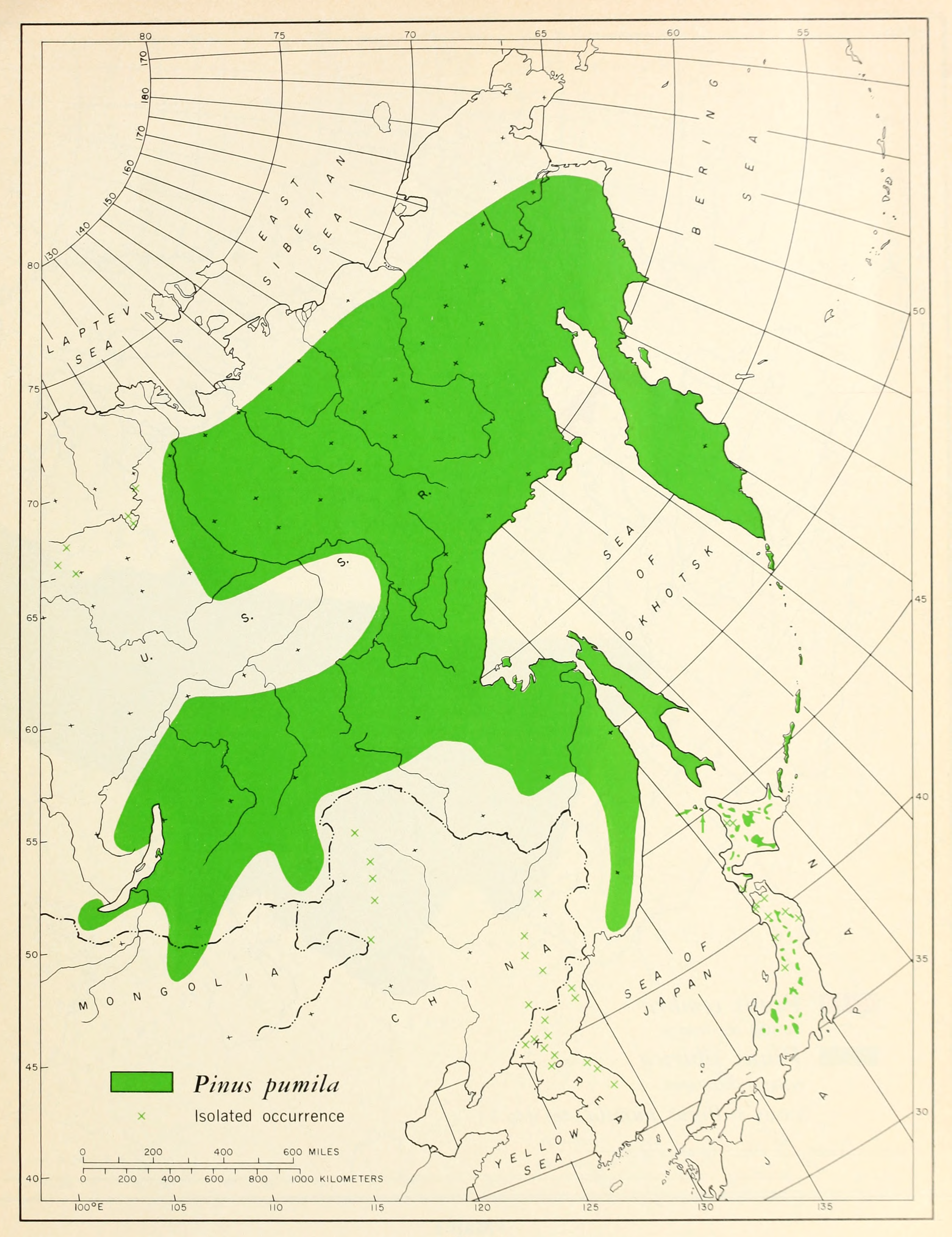

Synonyms
- Pinus cembra subsp. pumila (Pall.) Endl.; Pinus cembra var. pumila Pall.; Pinus cembra var. pygmaea Loudon; Pinus nana Lemée & H.Lév.; Pinus pumila var. mongolica Nakai; Pinus pumila f. auriamentata Y.N.Lee

= Pinus pumila =

Species of conifer

Pinus pumila, the Siberian dwarf pine, dwarf Siberian pine, dwarf stone pine, Japanese stone pine, or creeping pine, is a tree in the family Pinaceae native to northeastern Asia and the Japanese isles. It shares the common name creeping pine with several other plants.

== Description ==
The Siberian dwarf pine is an evergreen coniferous shrub ranging from 1–6 metres (3–20 feet) in height, but have individual branches that extend along the ground for ten metres or more giving a shrub diameter of up to a recorded maximum of 25–30 metres.

The leaves are needle-like, formed in bundles of five, and are 4–6 cm long and 1 mm thick with a triangular cross-section, dark green on the outer face, and glaucous with white stomatal lines on the inner faces; the basal sheaths of the bundles are early deciduous. The cones are 2.5–4.5cm long (rarely to 6 cm), green or purple before maturity, with soft scales and large nut-like seeds (pine nuts) 7–10 mm long and 5–7 mm broad. The cones are mature about 15-16 months after pollination; when ripe, they do not open, but are broken up by northern nutcrackers (Nucifraga caryocatactes), which cache the seeds in the ground for future consumption. Excess seeds are then able to germinate in ideal conditions.

In the mountains of northern Japan, it sometimes produces hybrids with the related Japanese white pine Pinus parviflora; these hybrids, named Pinus × hakkodensis, have cones up to 6 cm long that open at maturity, unlike P. pumila.

Shrub with cones, Kamchatka

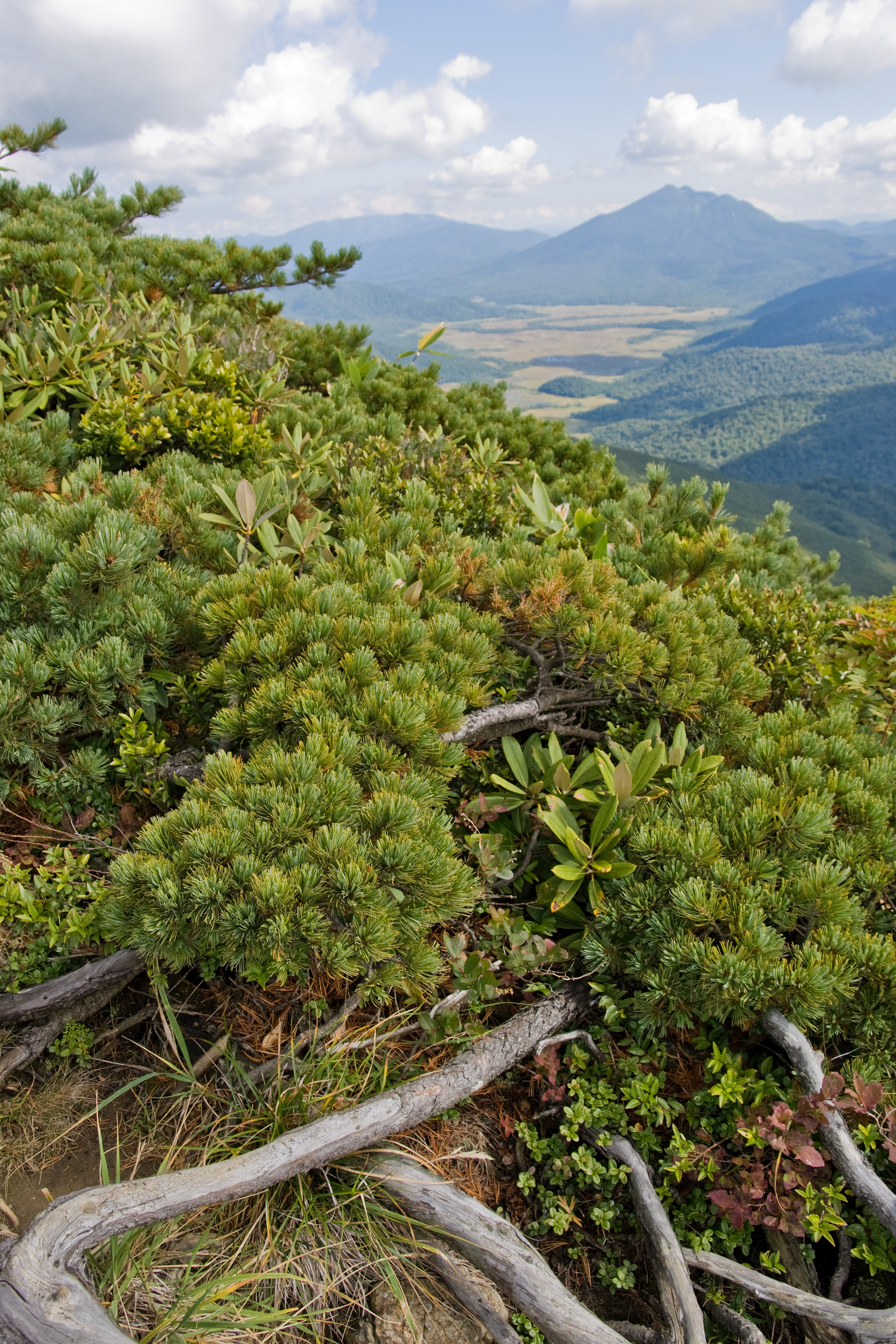
Shrub showing creeping stems

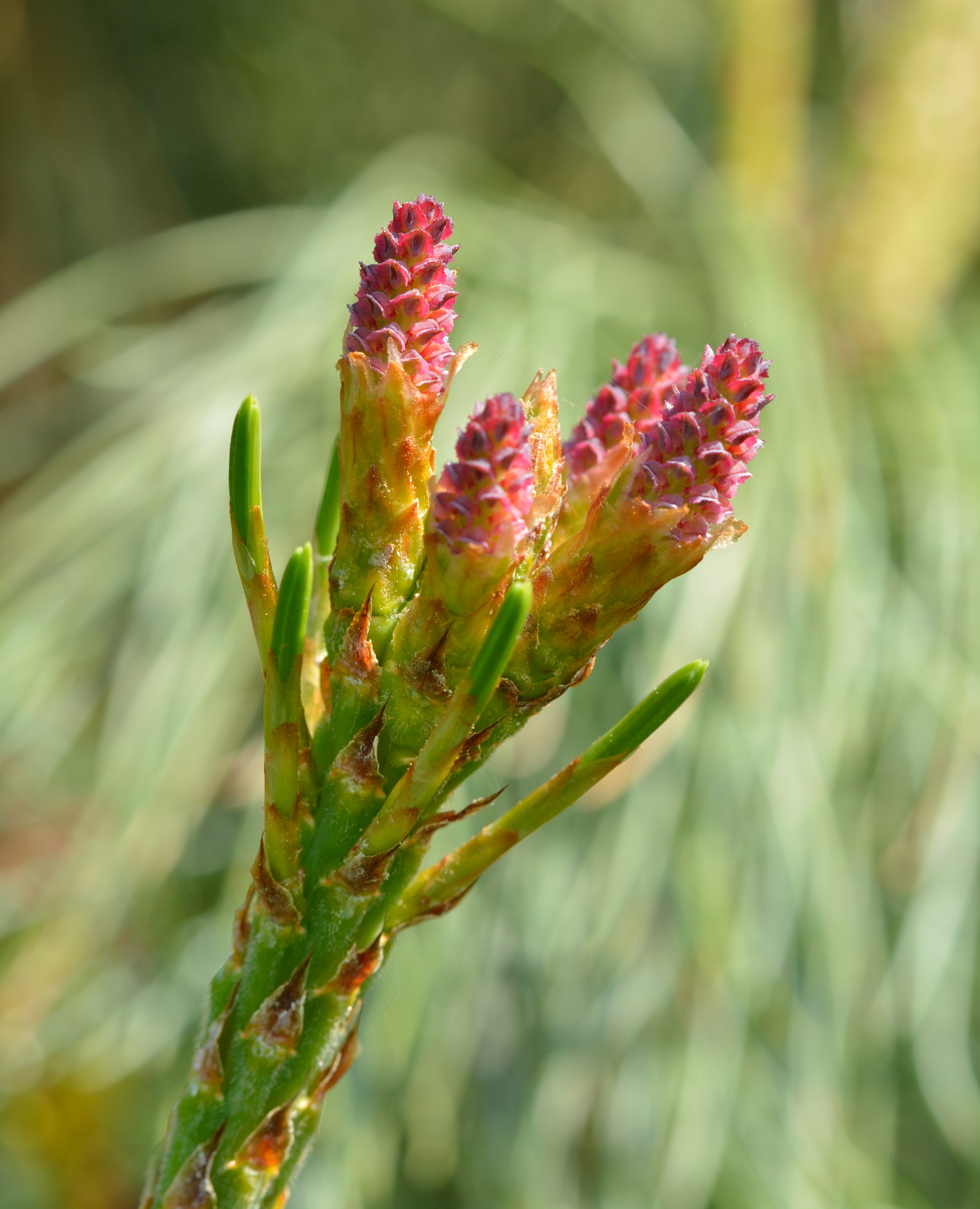
Young seed cones

Male cones

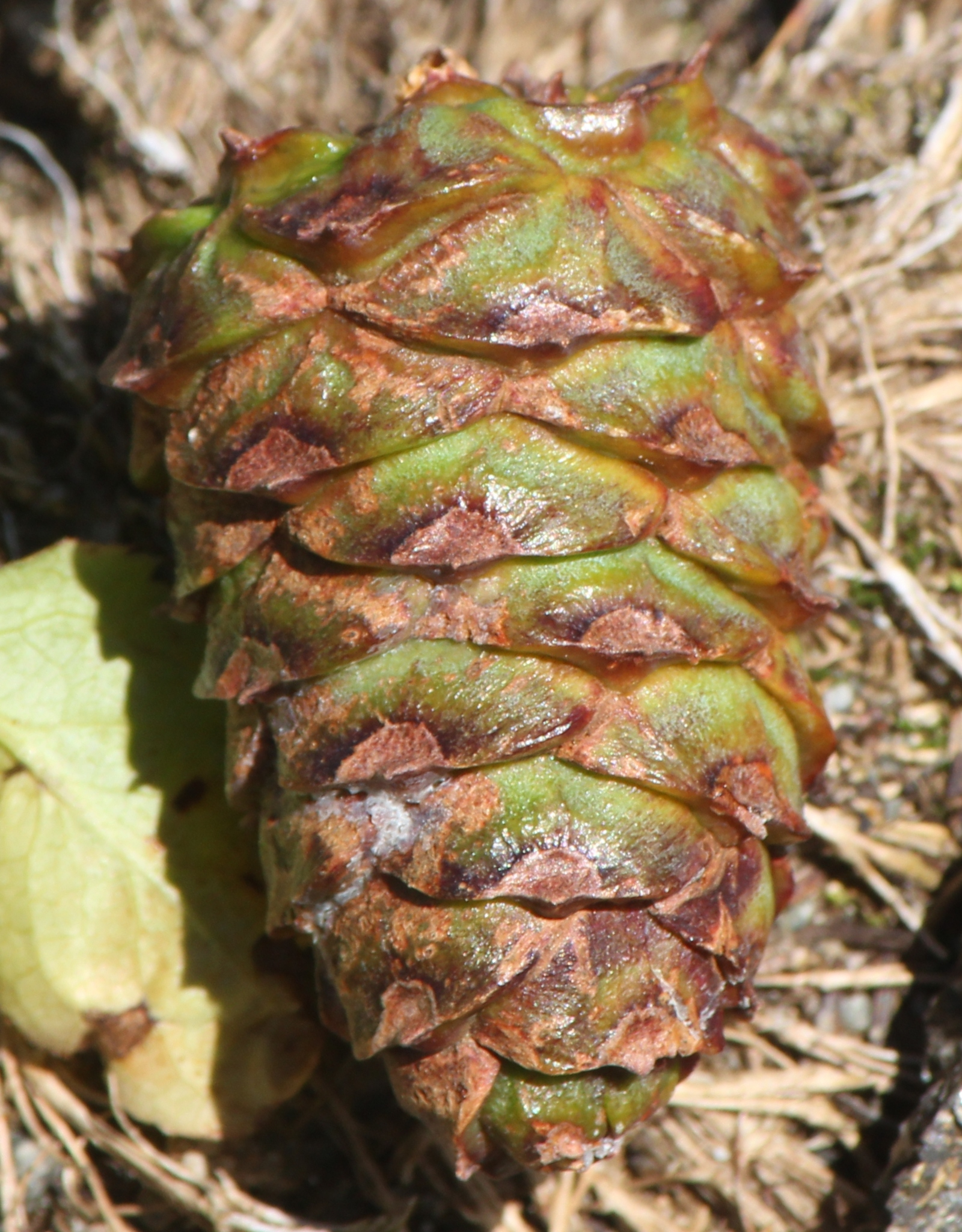
Mature seed cone

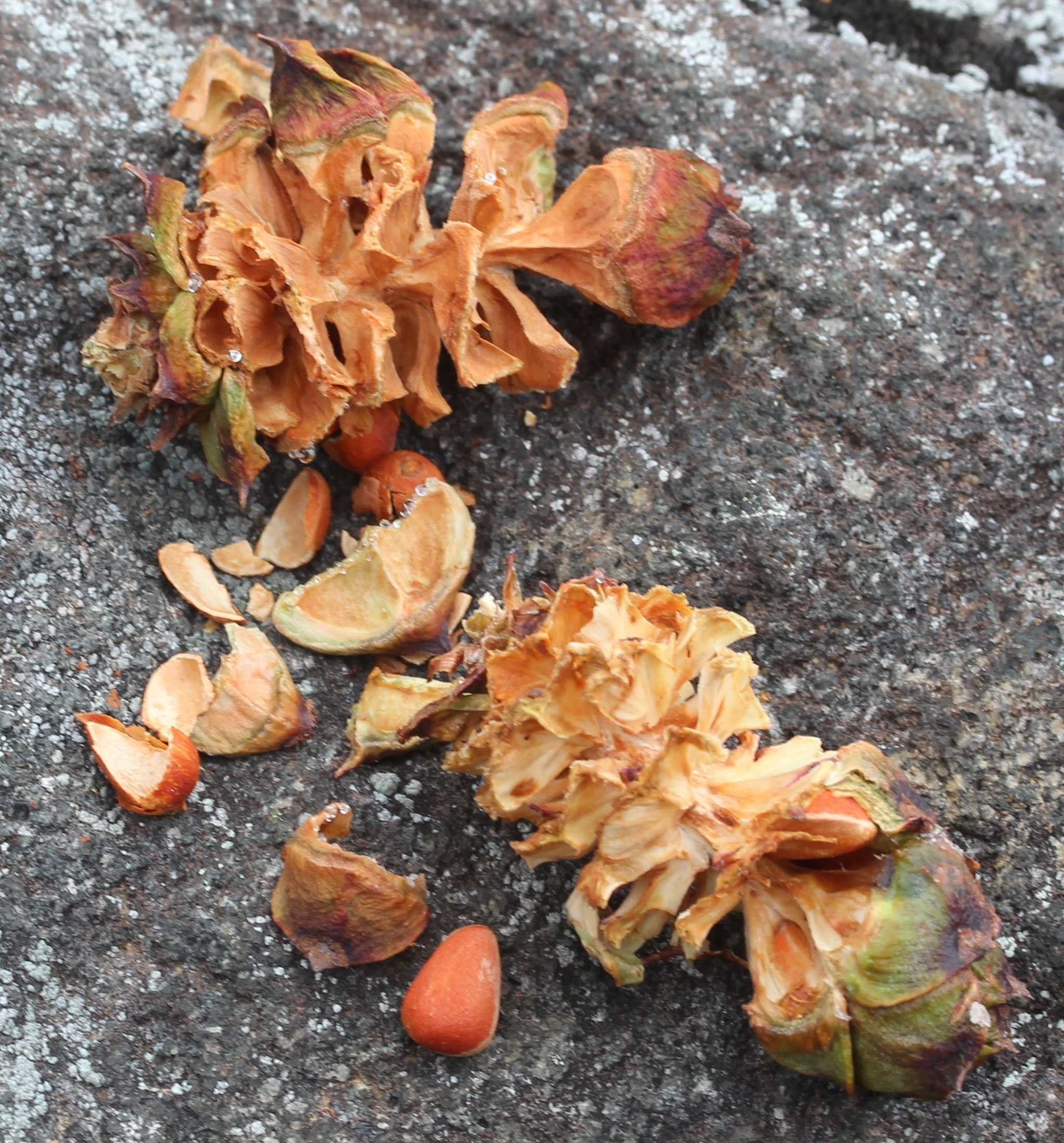
Mature seed cones and loose seed after seed harvest by a nutcracker

== Distribution ==
The range covers the Far East, Eastern Siberia, north-east of Mongolia, north-east of China, northern Japan and Korea. Siberian dwarf pine can be found along mountain chains, above the tree line, where it forms dense, uninterrupted thickets; it also grows on the headlands above the Okhotsk and Bering Seas, Tatarsk and on the Pacific coast in the Kuril Islands.

P. pumila grows very slowly. It can live up to 300 and, in some instances, 1,000 years.

== Ecology ==
Like other related pines, the seeds are harvested and dispersed by the northern nutcracker.

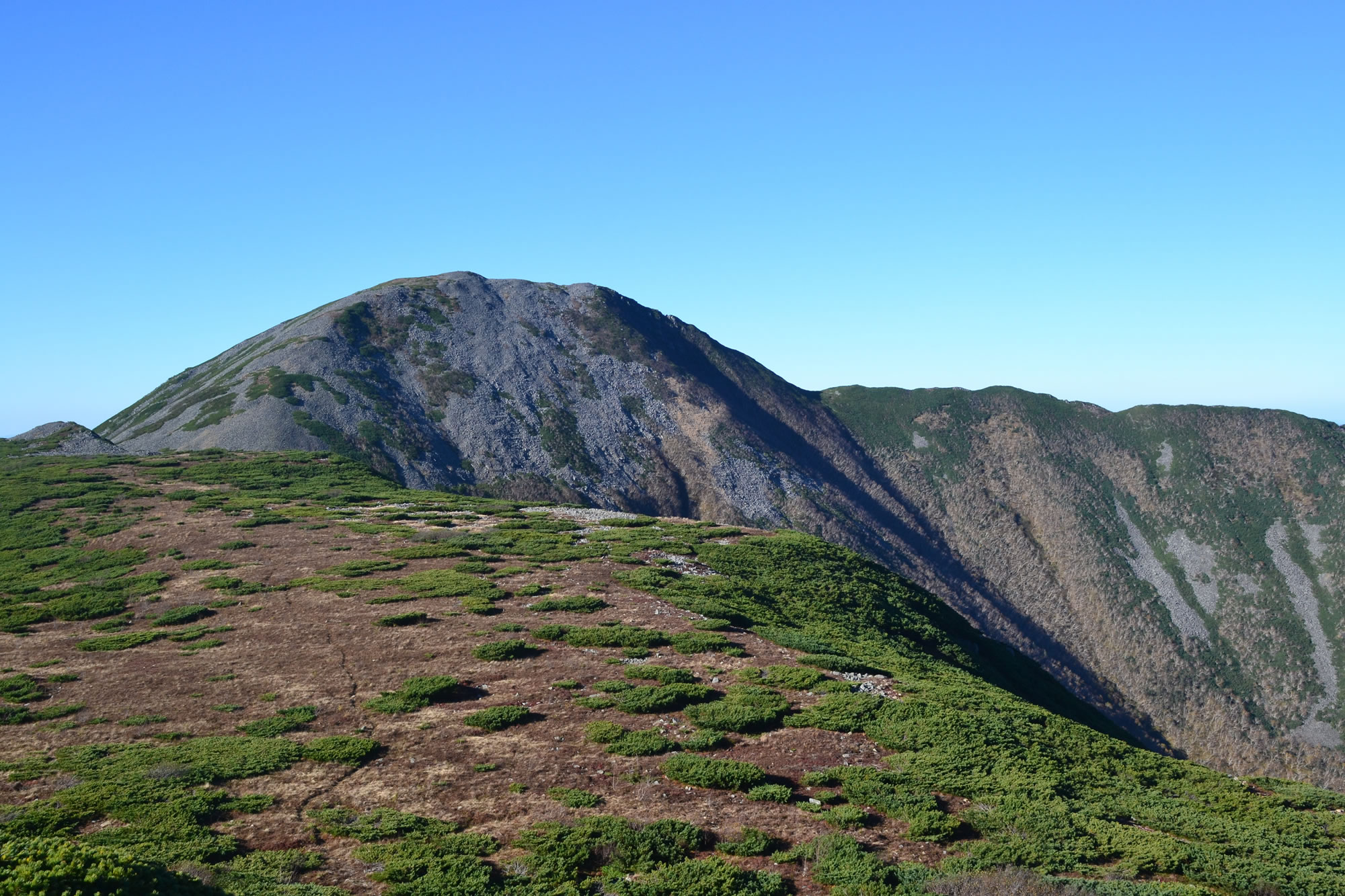
In its natural habitat in the Sikhote-Alin, eastern Siberia

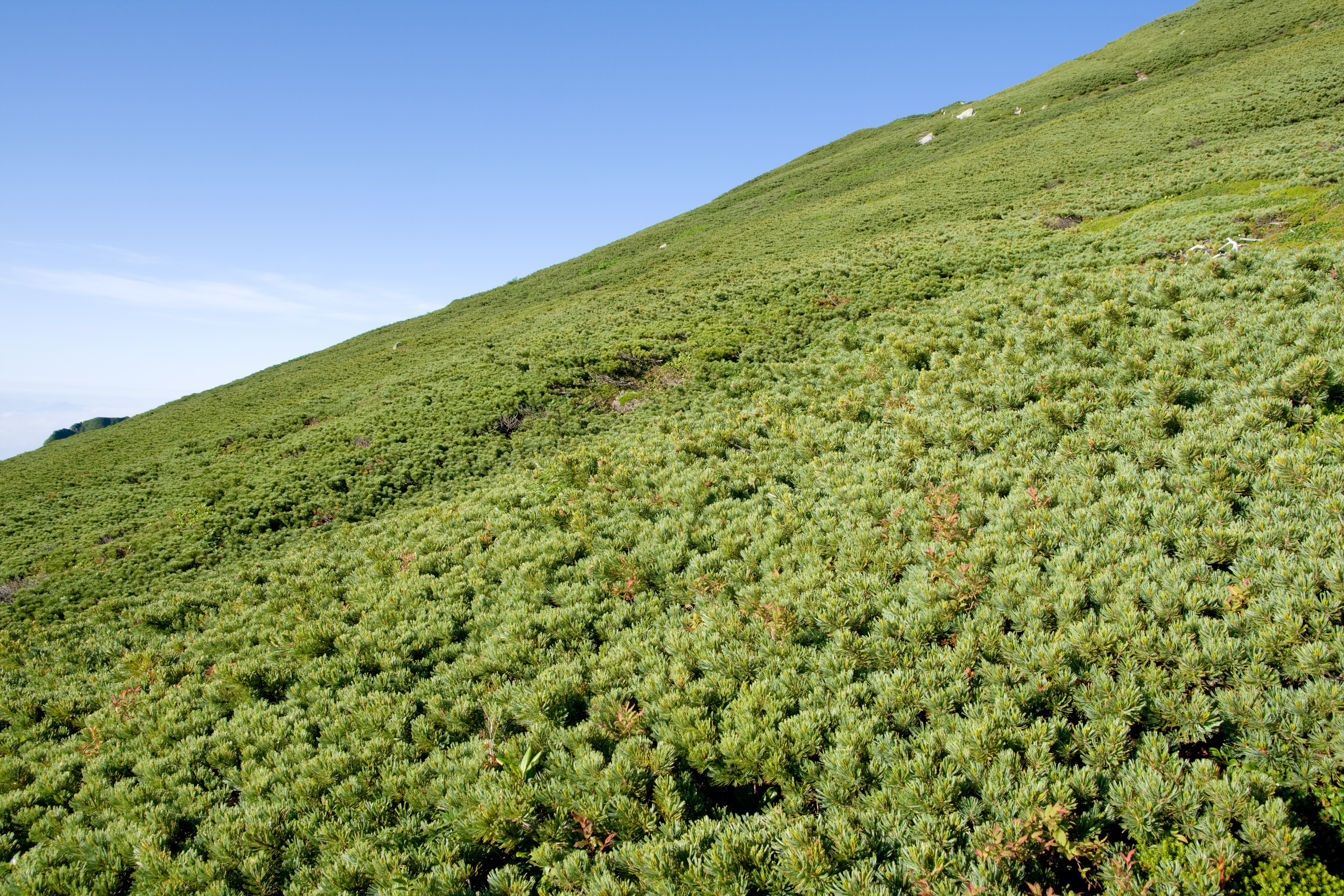
Pinus pumila on the Kiso Mountains of central Honshu, Japan

Northern nutcracker caching a Pinus pumila seed

P. pumila has highly flammable needles, branches, and cones and readily carries crown fires, especially where it grows continuously across local landscapes. Seed dispersal by nutcrackers can facilitate its recovery following severe fires caused by lightning strikes and other causes.

== Cultivation ==
This plant is grown as an ornamental shrub in parks and gardens. The cultivar P. pumila 'Glauca' has gained the Royal Horticultural Society's Award of Garden Merit.

== See also ==
- Pinus pumila × P. sibirica
