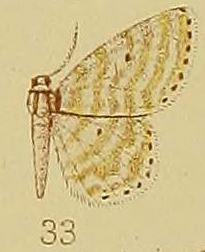

Scientific classification
- Domain: Eukaryota
- Kingdom: Animalia
- Phylum: Arthropoda
- Class: Insecta
- Order: Lepidoptera
- Family: Geometridae
- Genus: Scopula
- Species: S. quadrifasciata

Binomial name
- Scopula quadrifasciata (Bastelberger, 1909)

Synonyms
- Emmiltis quadrifasciata Bastelberger, 1909; Craspedia glaucocyma Hampson, 1910

= Scopula quadrifasciata =

Species of geometer moth in subfamily Sterrhinae

Scopula quadrifasciata is a moth of the family Geometridae. It is found in Angola, Kenya, Nigeria, South Africa, Tanzania, Uganda, Zambia and Zimbabwe.
