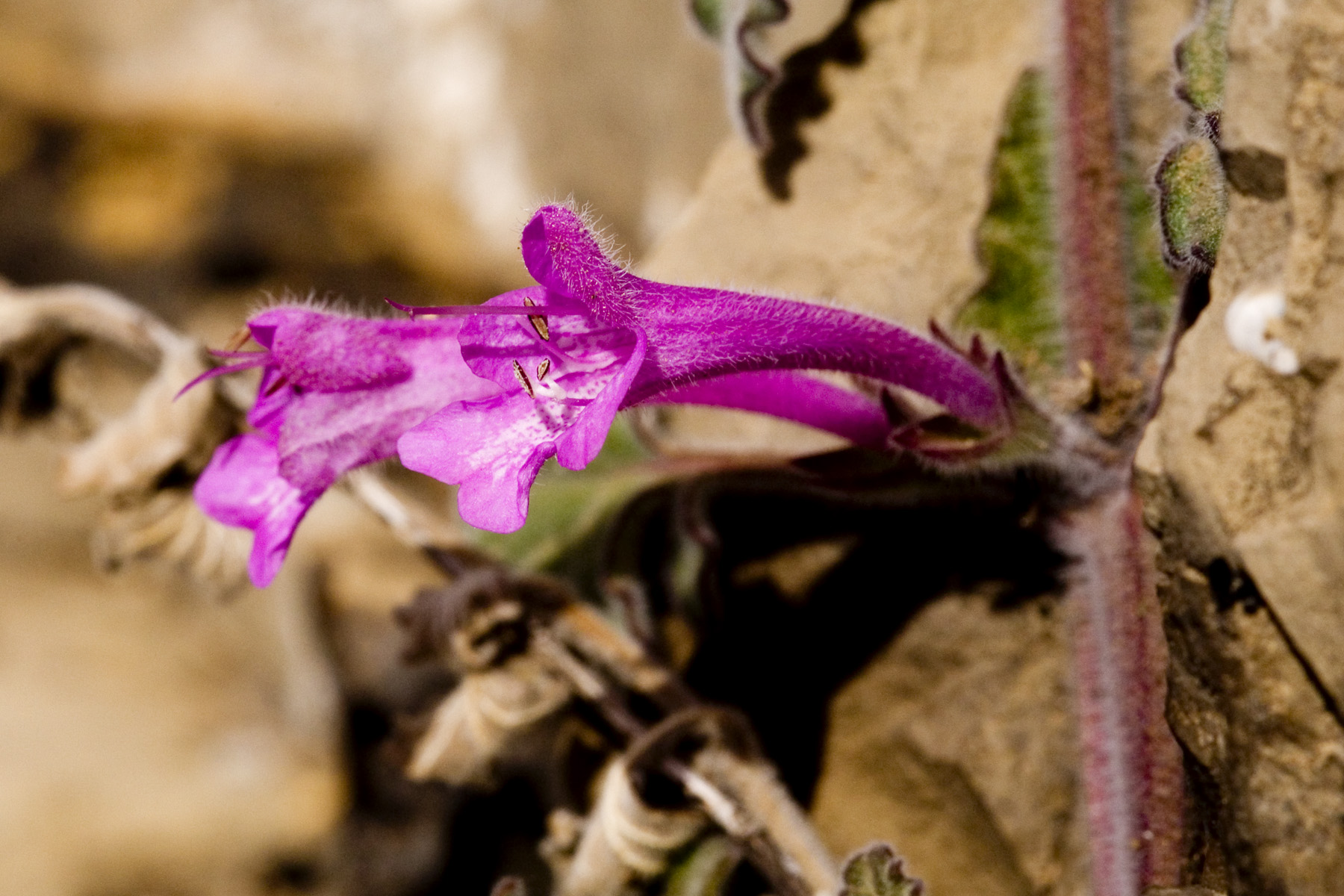

Scientific classification
- Kingdom: Plantae
- Clade: Tracheophytes
- Clade: Angiosperms
- Clade: Eudicots
- Clade: Asterids
- Order: Lamiales
- Family: Lamiaceae
- Genus: Salvia
- Species: S. summa

Binomial name
- Salvia summa A.Nelson

= Salvia summa =

Species of flowering plant

Salvia summa, the great sage or supreme sage, is a herbaceous perennial plant that is native to a small area in southern New Mexico, an adjacent area in northern Texas, and in Chihuahua, Mexico. The plant grows on limestone cliffs in part shade at 1,520 to 2,140 m (4,990 to 7,020 ft) elevation.

Salvia summa grows up to 30 cm (12 in) tall. The pink or pale lavender corolla is 35 to 45 mm (1.4 to 1.8 in) long, spotted with red in the throat, blooming in March–April. It is somewhat similar to Salvia henryi, which has red flowers and a shorter lower lip, and which grows in the same habitat.
