= Spulerina quadrifasciata =

Scientific classification
- Kingdom: Animalia
- Phylum: Arthropoda
- Class: Insecta
- Order: Lepidoptera
- Family: Gracillariidae
- Genus: Spulerina
- Species: S. quadrifasciata

Binomial name
- Spulerina quadrifasciata Bland, 1980

Species of moth

Spulerina quadrifasciata is a moth of the family Gracillariidae. It is known from Nigeria.

The wingspan is 6 mm (0.24 in) (holotype, male).
