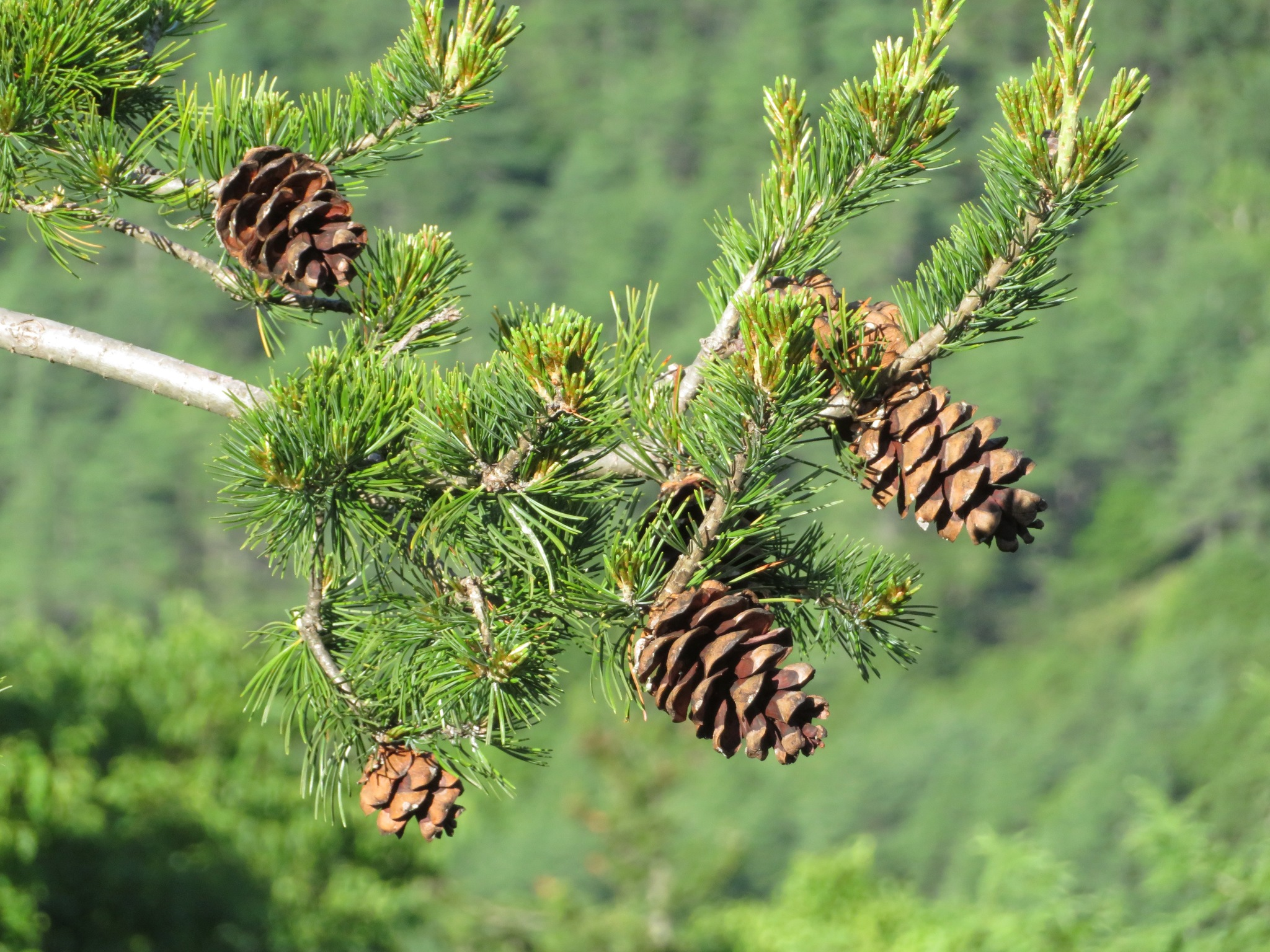
- Foliage and cones, Nagano Prefecture, Japan

Conservation status
- Least Concern (IUCN 3.1)

Scientific classification
- Kingdom: Plantae
- Clade: Tracheophytes
- Clade: Gymnospermae
- Division: Pinophyta
- Class: Pinopsida
- Order: Pinales
- Family: Pinaceae
- Genus: Pinus
- Subgenus: P. subg. Strobus
- Section: P. sect. Quinquefoliae
- Subsection: P. subsect. Strobus
- Species: P. parviflora

Binomial name
- Pinus parviflora Siebold & Zucc.

= Pinus parviflora =

Species of conifer

Pinus parviflora, also known as Japanese white pine, is a pine in the white pine group, Pinus subgenus Strobus, native to Japan.

== Description ==
It is a coniferous evergreen tree, growing to 15–25 m (rarely to 30 m) in height, forming a wide, dense, conical crown. The leaves are needle-like, in bundles of five, with a length of 3–7 cm. The cones are 4–8 cm long, with broad, rounded scales; the seeds are 7–10 mm long, with a vestigial 3–10 mm wing.

== Taxonomy ==
Two varieties are usually accepted; var. parviflora in southern Japan, and var. pentaphylla (Mayr) A.Henry in northern Japan. The second variety was first described as a separate species Pinus pentaphylla by Heinrich Mayr in 1890, but in reducing it to the rank of variety in 1910, Augustine Henry pointed out that the differences cited by Mayr between the two were minimal and inconsistent, with much overlap.

At higher altitudes in northern Japan, it can occur with the related high altutude species Pinus pumila, and sometimes produces hybrids with it; these are known as Pinus × hakkodensis Makino, named after the Hakkōda Mountains where it was first found.

The Latin specific epithet parviflora means "with small flowers".

== Uses ==
It is a popular tree for bonsai, and is also grown as an ornamental tree in parks and gardens. The cultivars 'Adcock's Dwarf' and 'Bonnie Bergman' have gained the Royal Horticultural Society's Award of Garden Merit.

== Gallery ==
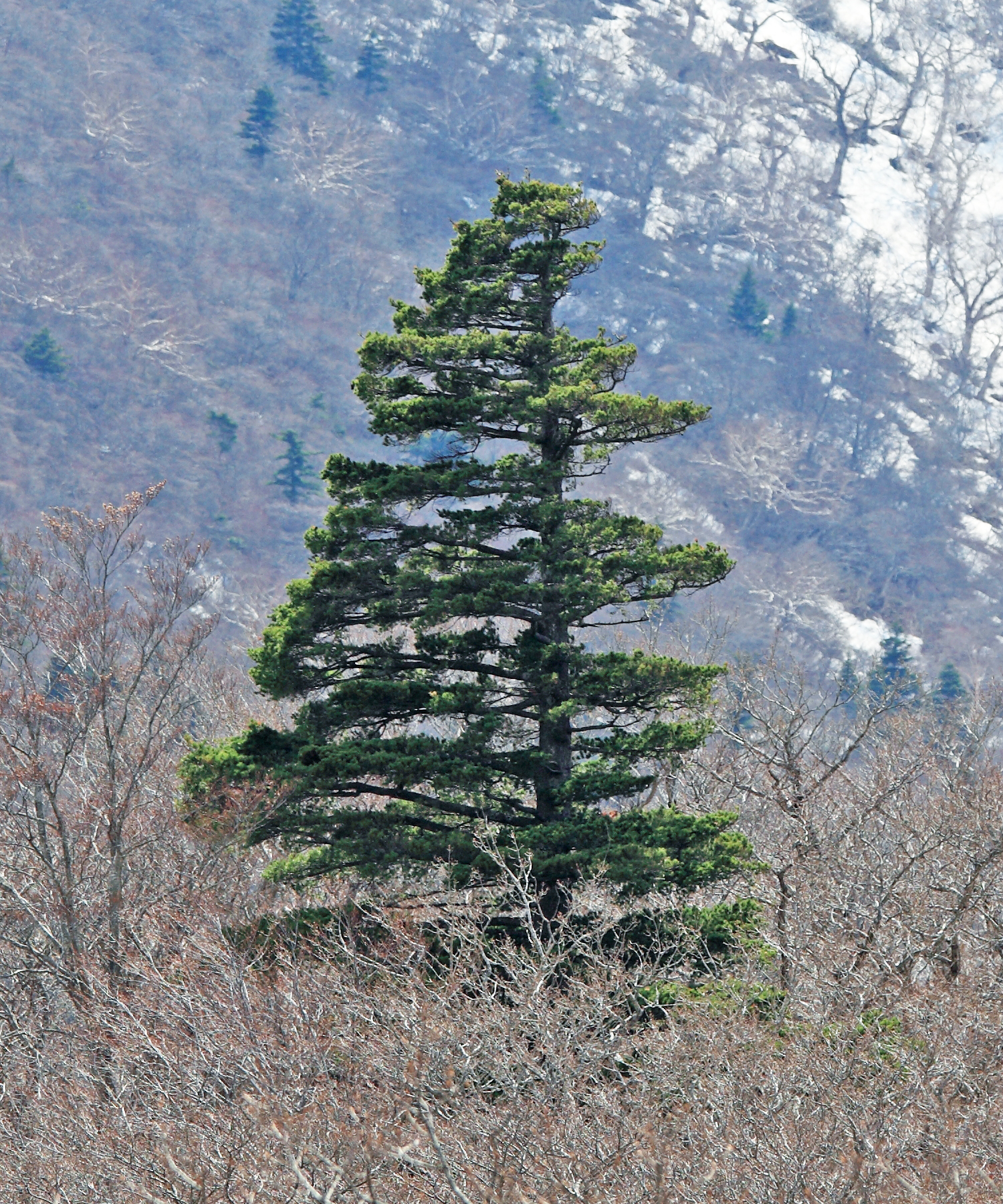
Old tree in Miyagi Prefecture, Japan

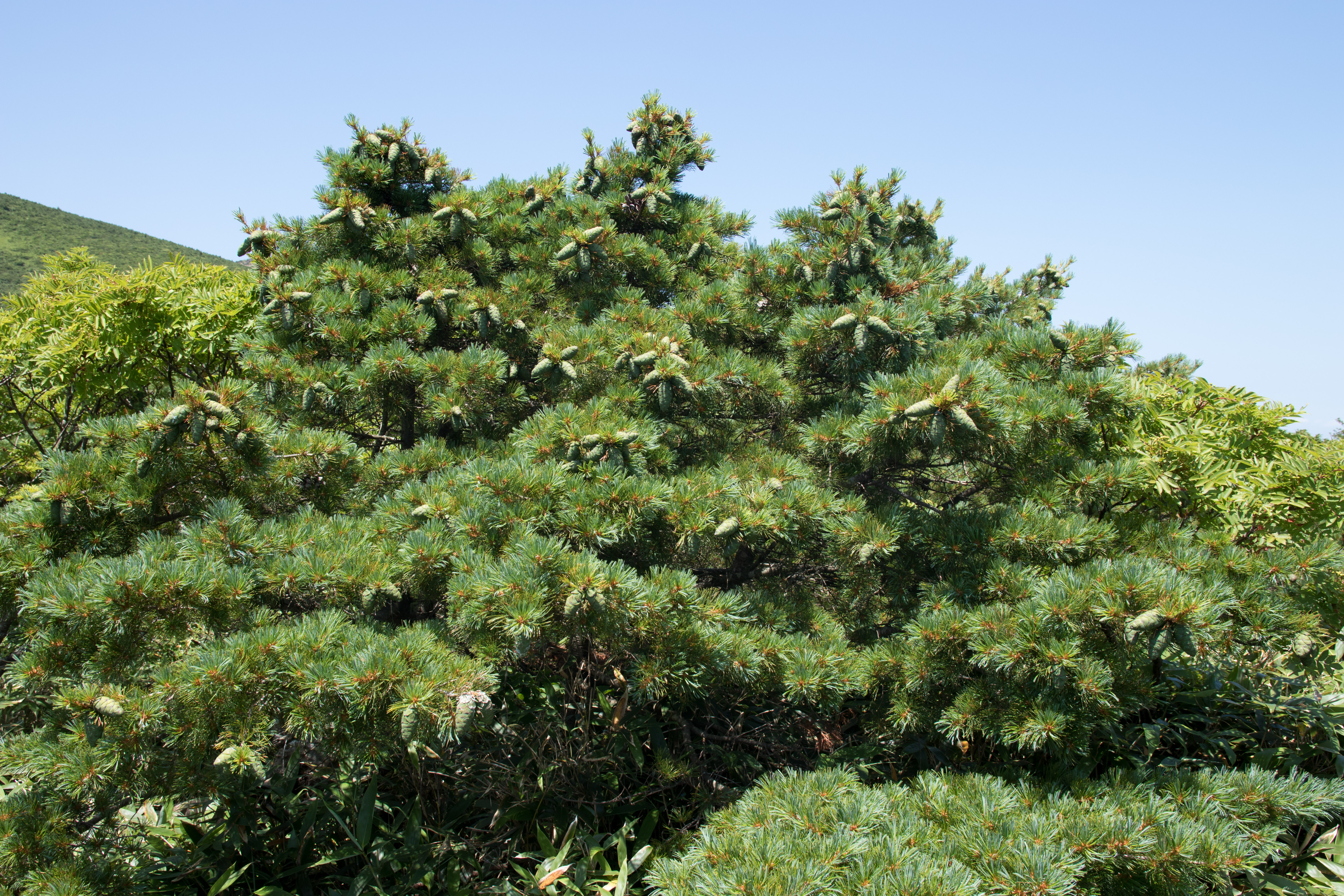
Young tree on Mount Adatara, Fukushima Prefecture

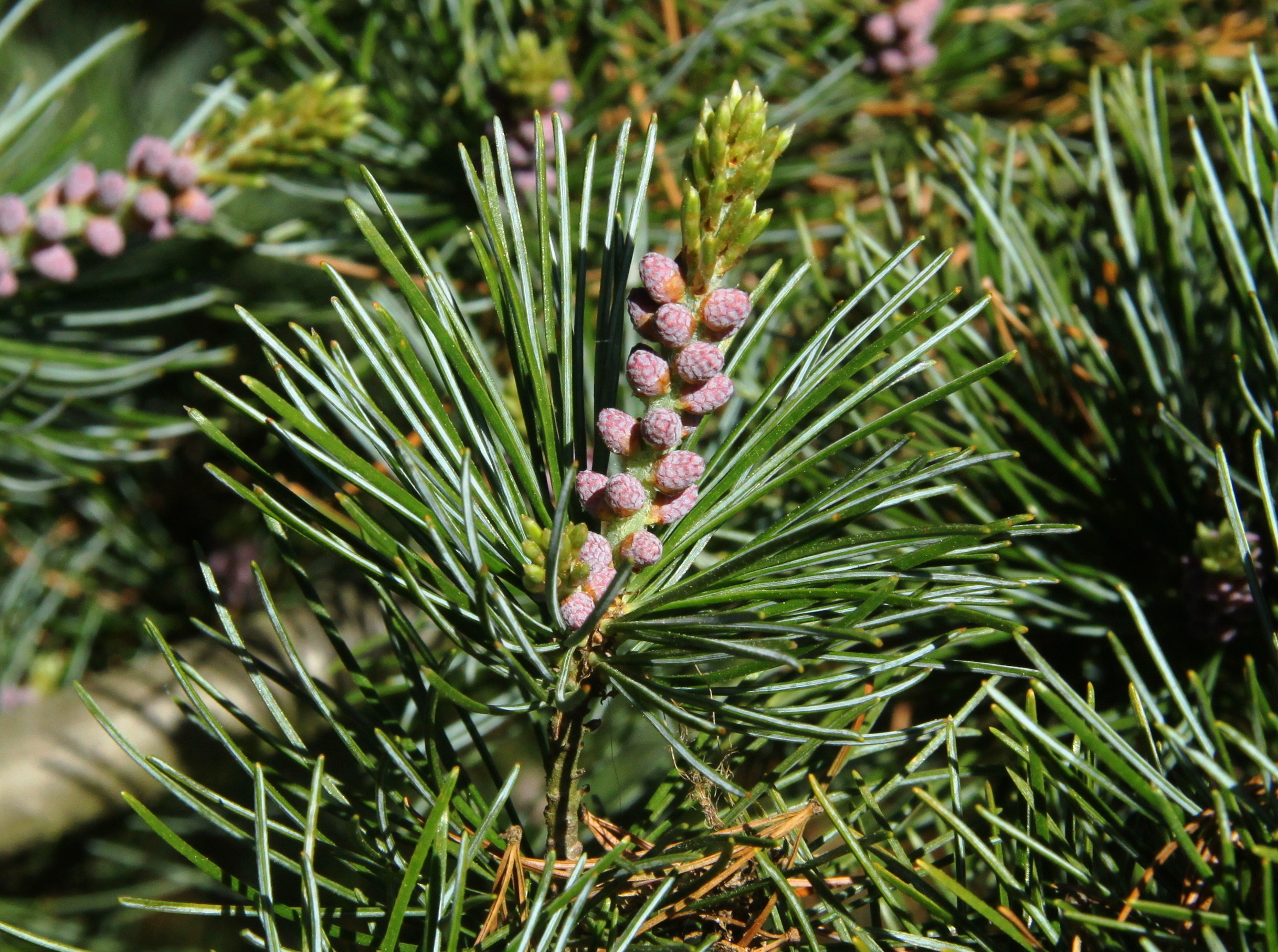
Pollen cones

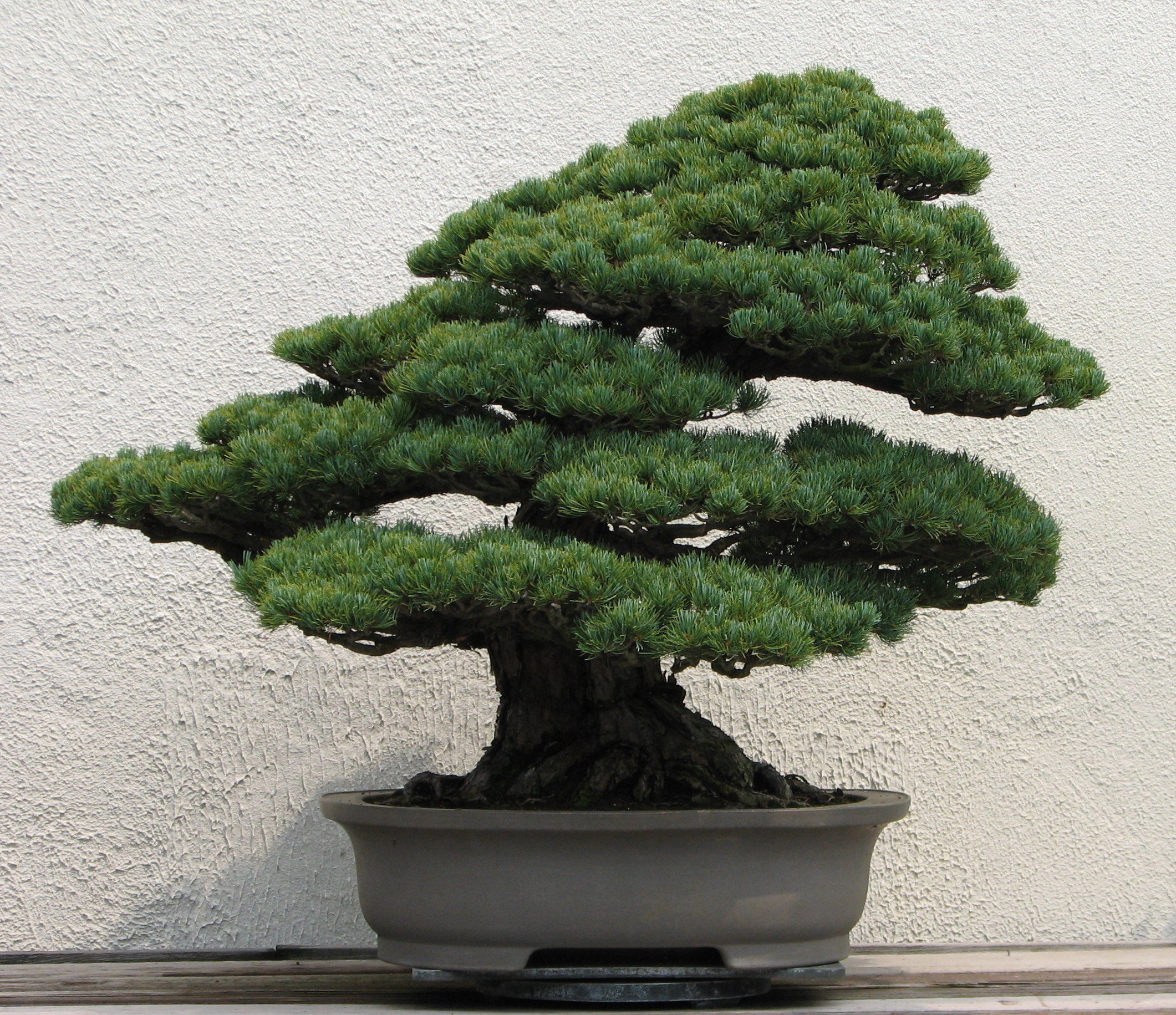
Bonsai tree
