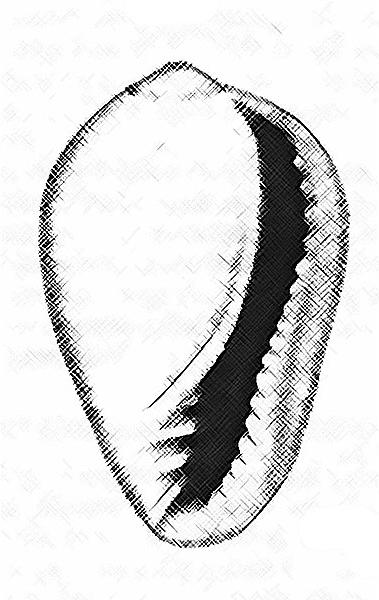
- Drawing of the shell

Scientific classification
- Kingdom: Animalia
- Phylum: Mollusca
- Class: Gastropoda
- Subclass: Caenogastropoda
- Order: Neogastropoda
- Family: Marginellidae
- Subfamily: Marginellinae
- Genus: Serrataginella; G.A. Coovert & H.K. Coovert, 1995

= Serrataginella =

Genus of gastropods

Serrataginella is a genus of sea snails, marine gastropod mollusks in the family Marginellidae, the margin snails.

Serrataginella is now a synonym of Serrata.

== Species ==
Species within the genus Serrataginella used to include:

- Serrataginella beatrix Cossignani, 2001: synonym of Serrata beatrix (T. Cossignani, 2001) (original combination)
- Serrataginella boussoufae Bozzetti & Briano, 2008: synonym of Serrata boussoufae (Bozzetti & Briano, 2008)
- Serrataginella brianoi(Bozzetti, 1994): synonym of Serrata brianoi Bozzetti, 1994
- Serrataginella isabelae Bozzetti, 2005: synonym of Serrata isabelae (Bozzetti, 2005) (original combination)
- Serrataginella spryi (Clover, 1974): synonym of Serrata spryi (Clover, 1974)
