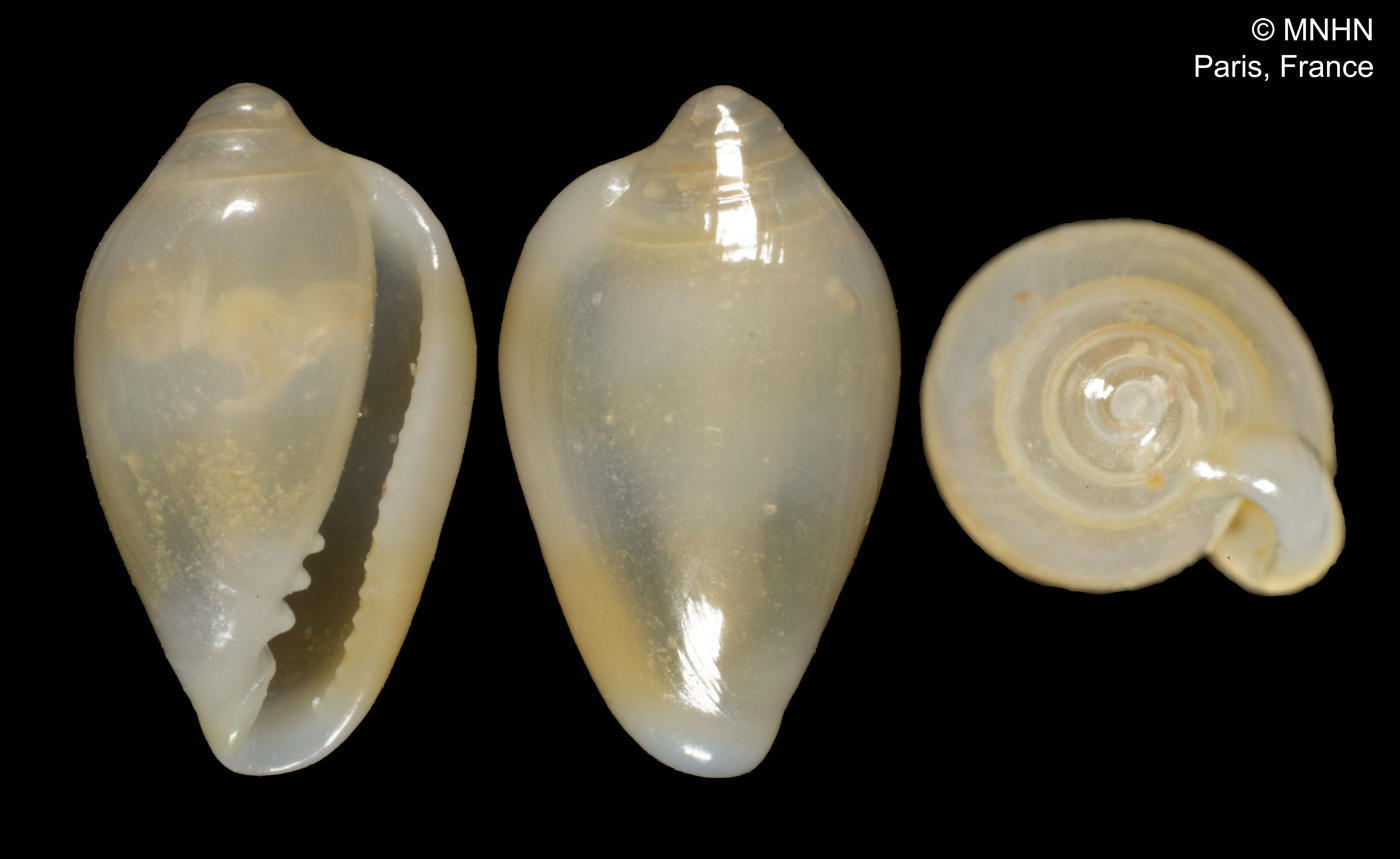
- Shell of Serrata beatrix (holotype at MNHN, Pris)

Scientific classification
- Kingdom: Animalia
- Phylum: Mollusca
- Class: Gastropoda
- Subclass: Caenogastropoda
- Order: Neogastropoda
- Family: Marginellidae
- Genus: Serrata
- Species: S. beatrix

Binomial name
- Serrata beatrix Cossignani, 2001

Synonyms
- Serrataginella beatrix T. Cossignani, 2001 (original combination)

= Serrata beatrix =

Species of gastropod

Serrata beatrix is a species of sea snail, a marine gastropod mollusc in the family Marginellidae, the margin snails.

== Description ==
The length of the shell attains 6.63 mm.

== Distribution ==
This marine species occurs off New Caledonia.
