= List of fir species of Denmark =

== The firs of Denmark ==
Several species of firs are found in Denmark:

- Abies alba
- Abies amabilis
- Abies balsamea
- Abies borisii-regis (alba x cephalonica)
- Abies cephalonica
- Abies concolor
- Abies concolor var. lowiana
- Abies equi-trojani (nordmanniana ssp. equi-trojani)
- Abies fabri (delavayi var. fabri)
- Abies fargesii
- Abies faxoniana (delavayi var. faxoniana)
- Abies fargesii (var. faxoniana)
- Abies firma
- Abies forrestii (delavayi var. forrestii)
- Abies fraseri
- Abies grandis
- Abies holophylla
- Abies homolepis
- Abies koreana
- Abies lasiocarpa
- Abies lasiocarpa var. arizonica
- Abies magnifica
- Abies magnifica var. shastensis
- Abies mariesii
- Abies nebrodensis (alba ssp. nebrodensis)
- Abies nephrolepis
- Abies nordmanniana
  - Abies nordmanniana subsp. equi-trojani, syn. Abies bornmuelleriana
- Abies numidica
- Abies pindrow
- Abies pinsapo
- Abies pinsapo var. tazaotana
- Abies procera
- Abies recurvata
- Abies sachalinensis
- Abies sibirica
- Abies sikokiana (veitchii var. sikokiana)
- Abies spectabilis
- Abies sutchuenensis (fargesii var. sutchuenensis)
- Abies veitchii
