= Abies fanjingshanensis =

Conservation status
- Endangered (IUCN 3.1)

Scientific classification
- Kingdom: Plantae
- Clade: Tracheophytes
- Clade: Gymnospermae
- Division: Pinophyta
- Class: Pinopsida
- Order: Pinales
- Family: Pinaceae
- Genus: Abies
- Species: A. fanjingshanensis

Binomial name
- Abies fanjingshanensis W.L. Huang, Y.L. Tu & S.Z. Fang

Species of conifer

Abies fanjingshanensis is a species of conifer in the family Pinaceae. It is found only in China, on Fanjing Mountain in Guizhou Province. It is threatened by habitat loss.
