= Abies yuanbaoshanensis =

Conservation status
- Critically Endangered (IUCN 3.1)

Scientific classification
- Kingdom: Plantae
- Clade: Tracheophytes
- Clade: Gymnosperms
- Division: Pinophyta
- Class: Pinopsida
- Order: Pinales
- Family: Pinaceae
- Genus: Abies
- Species: A. yuanbaoshanensis

Binomial name
- Abies yuanbaoshanensis Y.J. Lu & L.K. Fu

Species of fir tree found in China

Abies yuanbaoshanensis is a species of fir tree in the family Pinaceae. It is found only in the Yuanbao Mountains within Guangxi province of China. It is a critically endangered species. It is estimated that only 700 trees exist, including saplings
