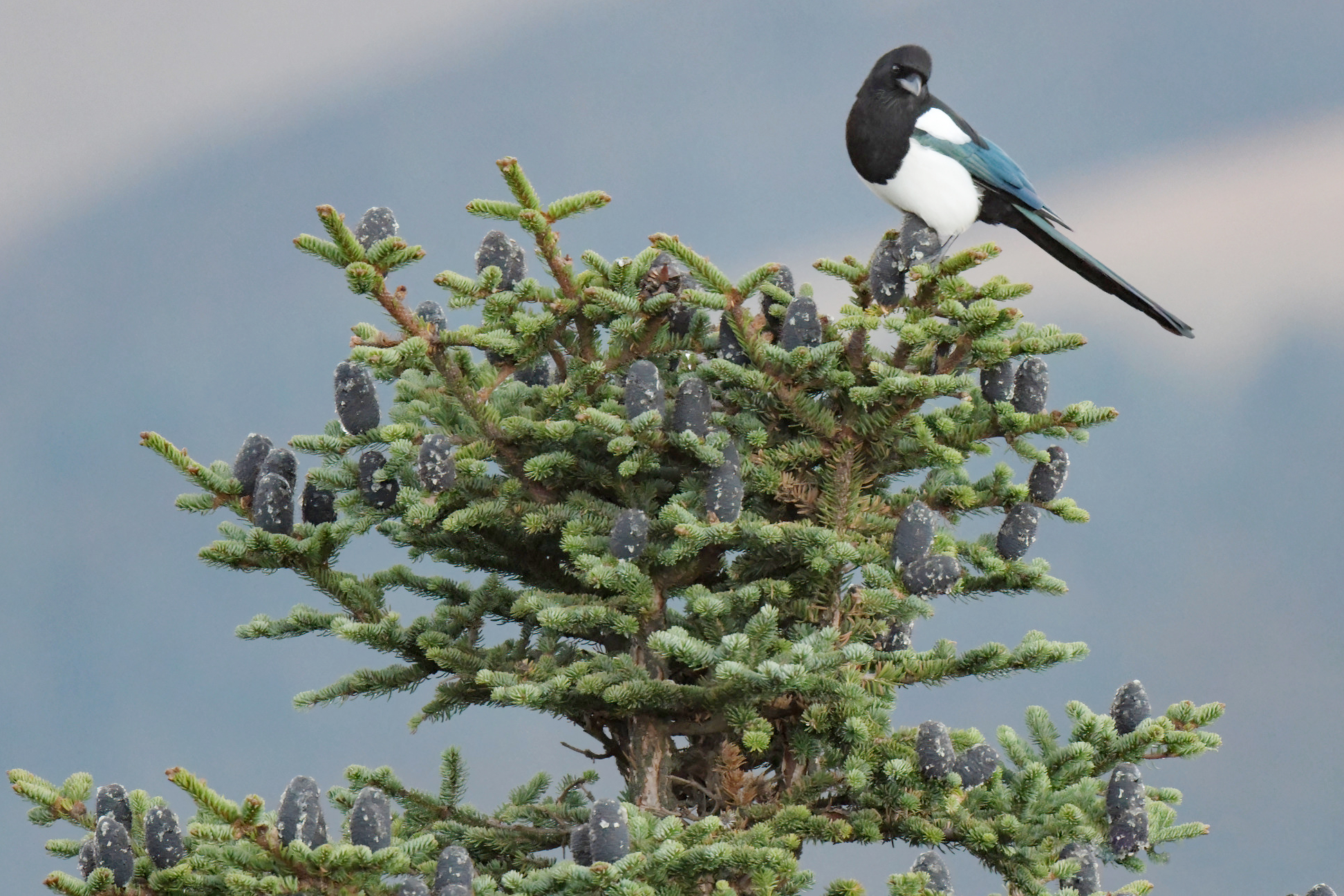
- Abies squamata foliage and cones (with a black-rumped magpie), western Sichuan. The flaking bark is visible at the base of the stem.

Conservation status
- Vulnerable (IUCN 3.1)

Scientific classification
- Kingdom: Plantae
- Clade: Tracheophytes
- Clade: Gymnospermae
- Division: Pinophyta
- Class: Pinopsida
- Order: Pinales
- Family: Pinaceae
- Genus: Abies
- Species: A. squamata

Binomial name
- Abies squamata Mast.

= Abies squamata =

Species of conifer

Abies squamata, known as the Flaky Fir, is a species of conifer in the family Pinaceae. This fir occurs in the southeast of the Tibetan Plateau and western Sichuan (China) in an altitude from 3200 metres to the tree-line at 4400 metres. Exceptionally it occurs up to 4700 metres, the highest tree line tree growth in the world. (Note: Some Juniperus in the Himalaya, and Polylepis in the Andes, grow at higher altitudes, but are shrubs, not single-trunk trees) It is dominant on north-facing slopes and often grows with Balfour's spruce (Picea balfouriana).

== Taxonomy ==
It is a member of the section Abies sect. Pseudopicea, which occur at high to very high altitudes in the Sino-Himalayan mountain system and have stout, barrel-shaped, dark purple cones with a stout central rachis.

== Description ==
It is typically a small tree growing to 10–15 metres tall, but in favourable sites can grow to 40 metres. The bark is highly distinctive, orange-red to greyish, thinly flaky and scaly on branches and in the upper crown, unlike any other Abies species, and more resembling a birch or a paperbark maple; this character gives it both its scientific and English names. The foliage is glaucous greyish-green, with short needles (10–)15–25 mm long, green above with scattered stomata near the tip, and with greyish-white stomatal bands below. The cones are similar to those of the other members of section Pseudopicea (particularly A. fargesii), dark purple and barrel-shaped, but smaller than the other species, 5–6 cm long and 3–4 cm wide; the bracts are slightly exserted with a slender bristle tip.

== Threats ==
Government sector logging that was rampant until the logging ban in 1998 reduced fir stands significantly. Reforestation after the ban was dominated by spruce, since Abies squamata is susceptible to stem rot and thus shunned by the state forest bureaus. Undergrowth is most commonly dominated by members of the genus Rhododendron. Local Tibetans know this fir as "bollo", but that term is a general term for firs and spruces.

== Cultivation ==
Abies squamata is occasionally grown in botanical gardens, but is very difficult to grow, due to its slow growth and susceptibility to late spring frosts. Very few trees have survived in cultivation for any length of time. In Britain, the best growth has been in the relatively cool and dry climate of eastern Scotland, with notable original introduction specimens at Durris Castle near Aberdeen, and formerly at Dawyck Botanic Garden until it blew down in 2022.
