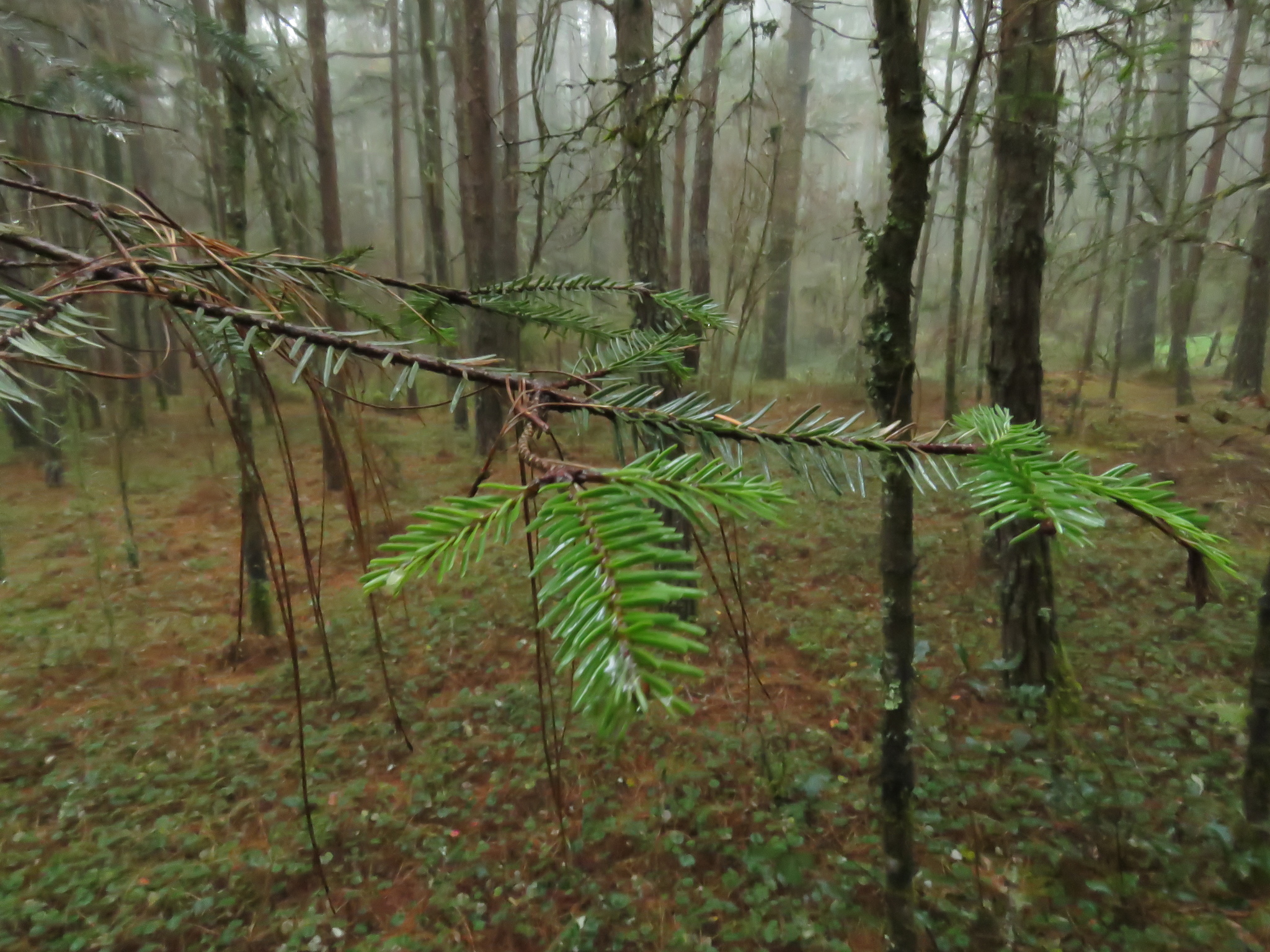

Conservation status
- Endangered (IUCN 3.1)

Scientific classification
- Kingdom: Plantae
- Clade: Tracheophytes
- Clade: Gymnospermae
- Division: Pinophyta
- Class: Pinopsida
- Order: Pinales
- Family: Pinaceae
- Genus: Abies
- Species: A. hickelii

Binomial name
- Abies hickelii Flous & Gaussen

= Abies hickelii =

Species of conifer

Abies hickelii is a species of conifer in the family Pinaceae.

It is endemic to Mexico, found only in Chiapas, Guerrero, Oaxaca, Puebla, Veracruz states.
