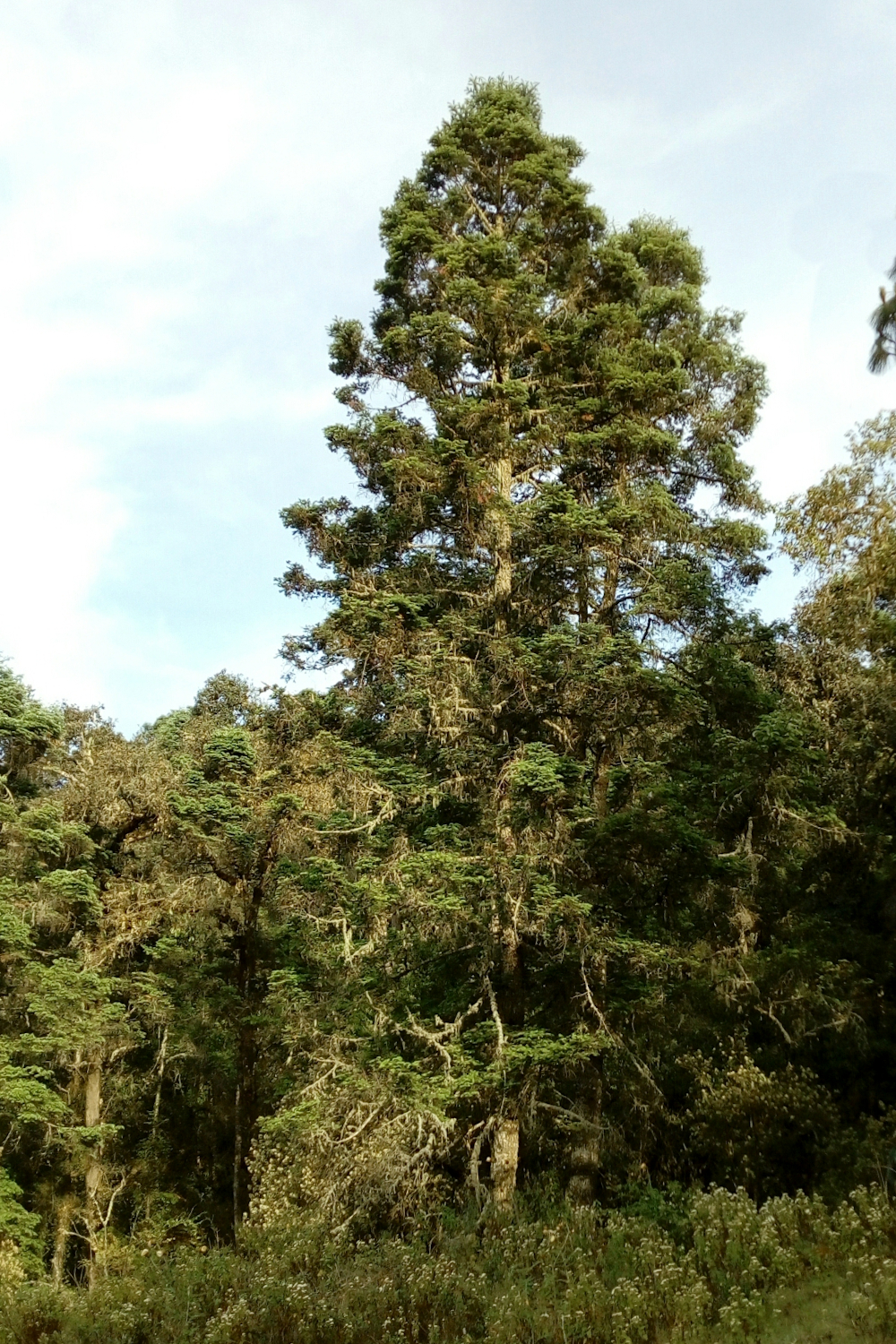
- Mature tree at La Cañada del Carmen, Jalisco

Conservation status
- Near Threatened (IUCN 3.1)

Scientific classification
- Kingdom: Plantae
- Clade: Tracheophytes
- Clade: Gymnospermae
- Division: Pinophyta
- Class: Pinopsida
- Order: Pinales
- Family: Pinaceae
- Genus: Abies
- Species: A. jaliscana

Binomial name
- Abies jaliscana (Martínez) Mantilla, Shalisko & A.Vázquez

Synonyms
- Abies guatemalensis var. jaliscana Martínez; Abies guatemalensis subsp. jaliscana (Martínez) Silba; Abies religiosa var. emarginata Loock & Martínez

= Abies jaliscana =

Species of plant

Abies jaliscana, the Jalisco fir, is a species of conifer in the family Pinaceae. Previously considered to be a variety or subspecies of Abies guatemalensis, the species is endemic to the Western Mexican state of Jalisco, hence its specific epithet. A. jaliscana was found to dominate in fir forests in western Mexico with elevations from 1750–2450 m altitude. A. jaliscana is currently under the protection of the Mexican Endangered Species Act, due to its limited distribution. It is closely related to Abies grandis and Abies concolor of western North America, included in the same section Grandis of the genus.

== Description ==
Abies jaliscana is an evergreen tree growing to 20–30 metres (66–98 ft) tall, with a trunk up to 1 metre (3 ft 3 in) diameter and a narrow conic crown becoming irregular with age. The leaves are needle-like, flattened, 3.5–8 cm (1.4–3.1 in) long and 0.8–1.5 millimetres (1/32–1/16 in) wide, glossy green above, with two whitish bands of stomata below, and slightly notched to obtuse at the tip. The leaf arrangement is spiral on the shoot, but on lower crown foliage with each leaf variably twisted at the base so they are pectinate (all lying in two flat ranks on either side of the shoot); in the upper crown the leaves are more assurgent, sticking up above the shoots.

Pollination occurs in winter, beginning late November into January, with cone maturation in late spring, in April to May. Seed disperal occurs between late spring and early summer, May to June. This is unlike all other Abies, where pollination is in spring and cone maturation in autumn. The immature cones are green, maturing pale brown; they are 6–10 centimetres (2.4–3.9 in) long and 2.5–4 centimetres (0.98–1.57 in) broad. The bracts are included or with the tips exserted by up to 4 mm.

== Habitat ==
It is most abundant on steep mountainsides and in humid ravines at 1800-2400m altitude. There is no observed population mixing between Abies jaliscana and any other Abies species. Radial trunk growth in A. jaliscana increases with increasing in altitude, suggesting that this is the primary climatic element affecting radial growth.

== Gallery ==
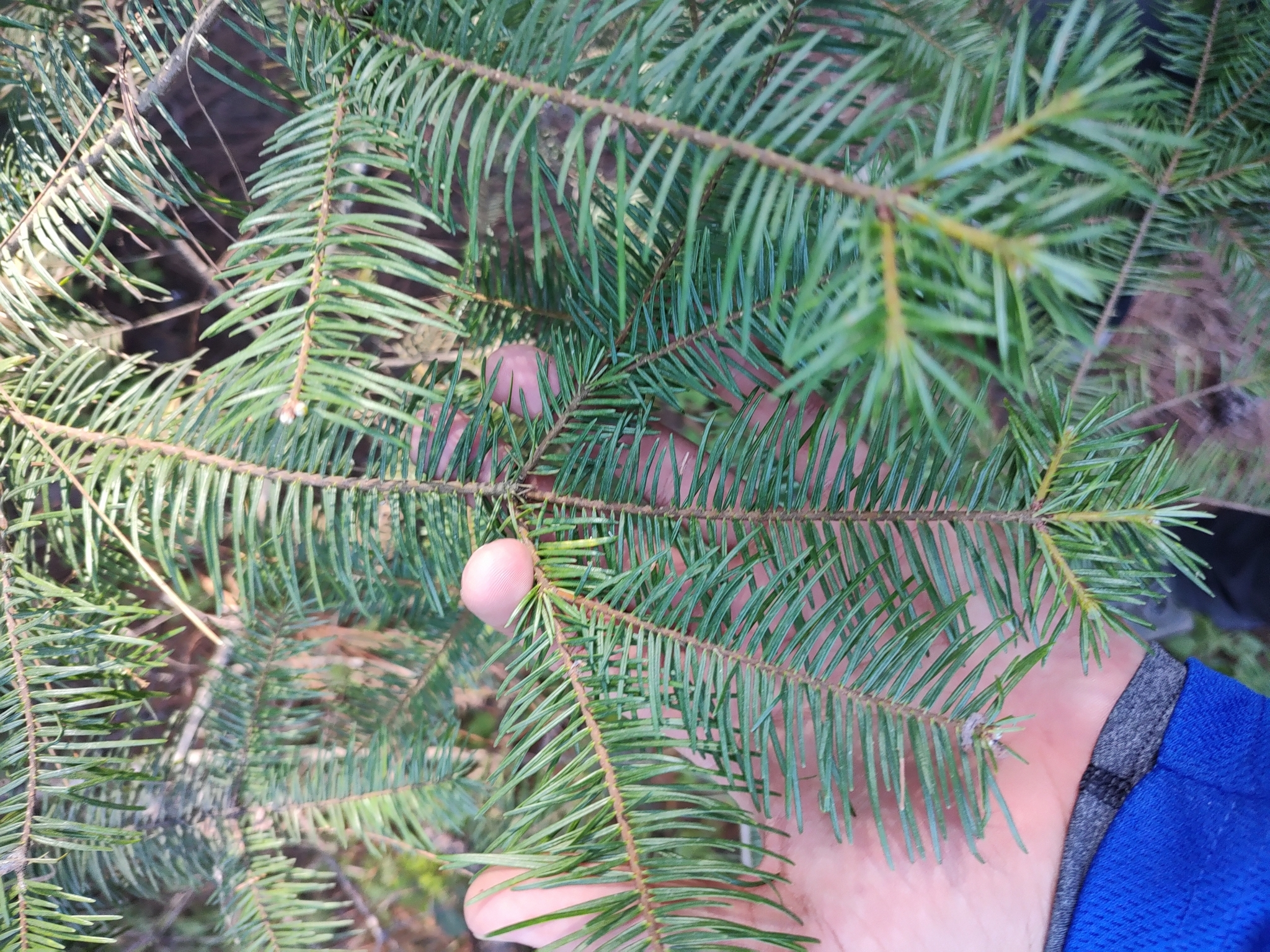
Lower crown foliage with pectinate needles. Late November, Hostotipac, Jalisco.

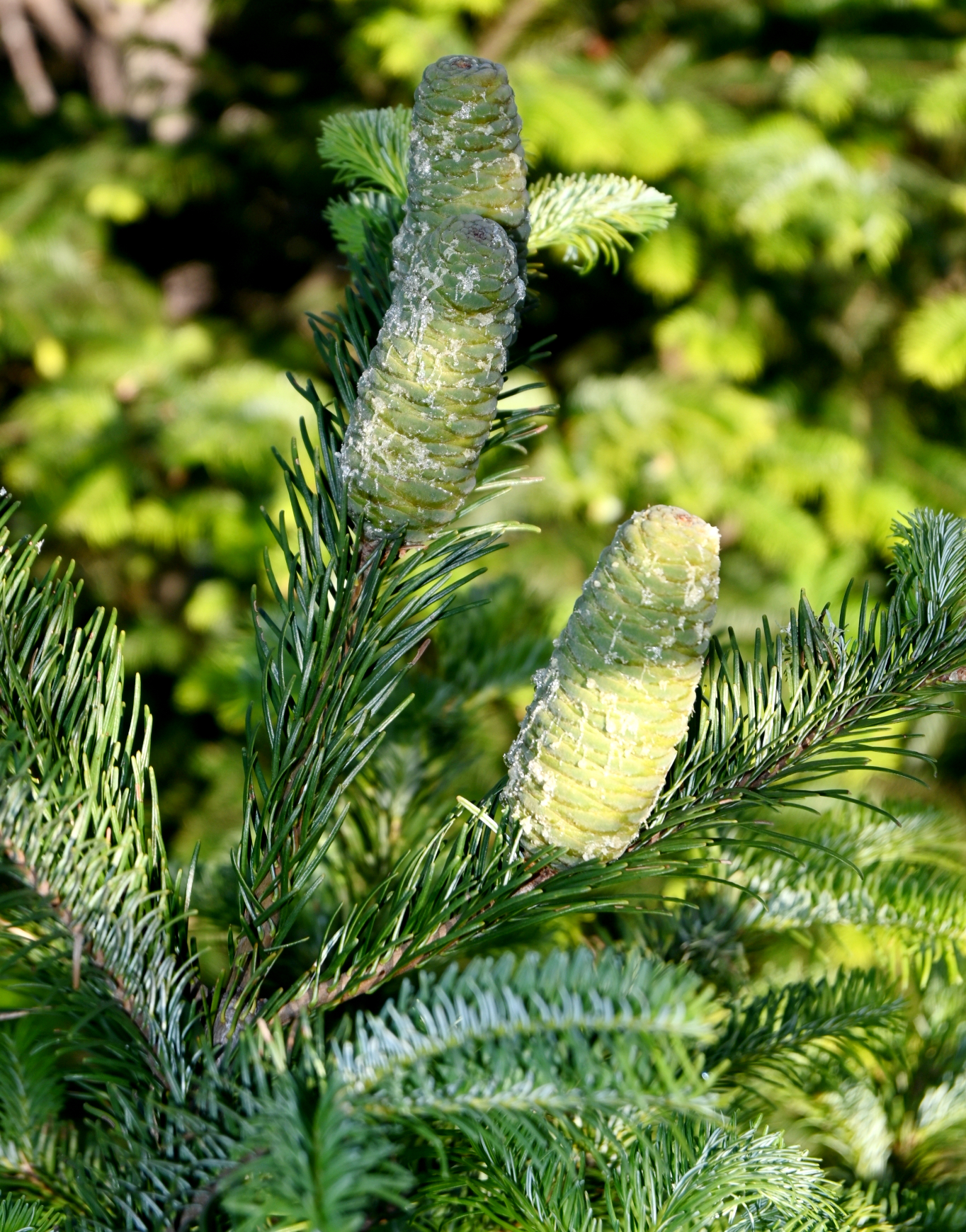
Upper crown foliage with assurgent needles, with immature cones with included bracts. Late March, Hostotipac, Jalisco.

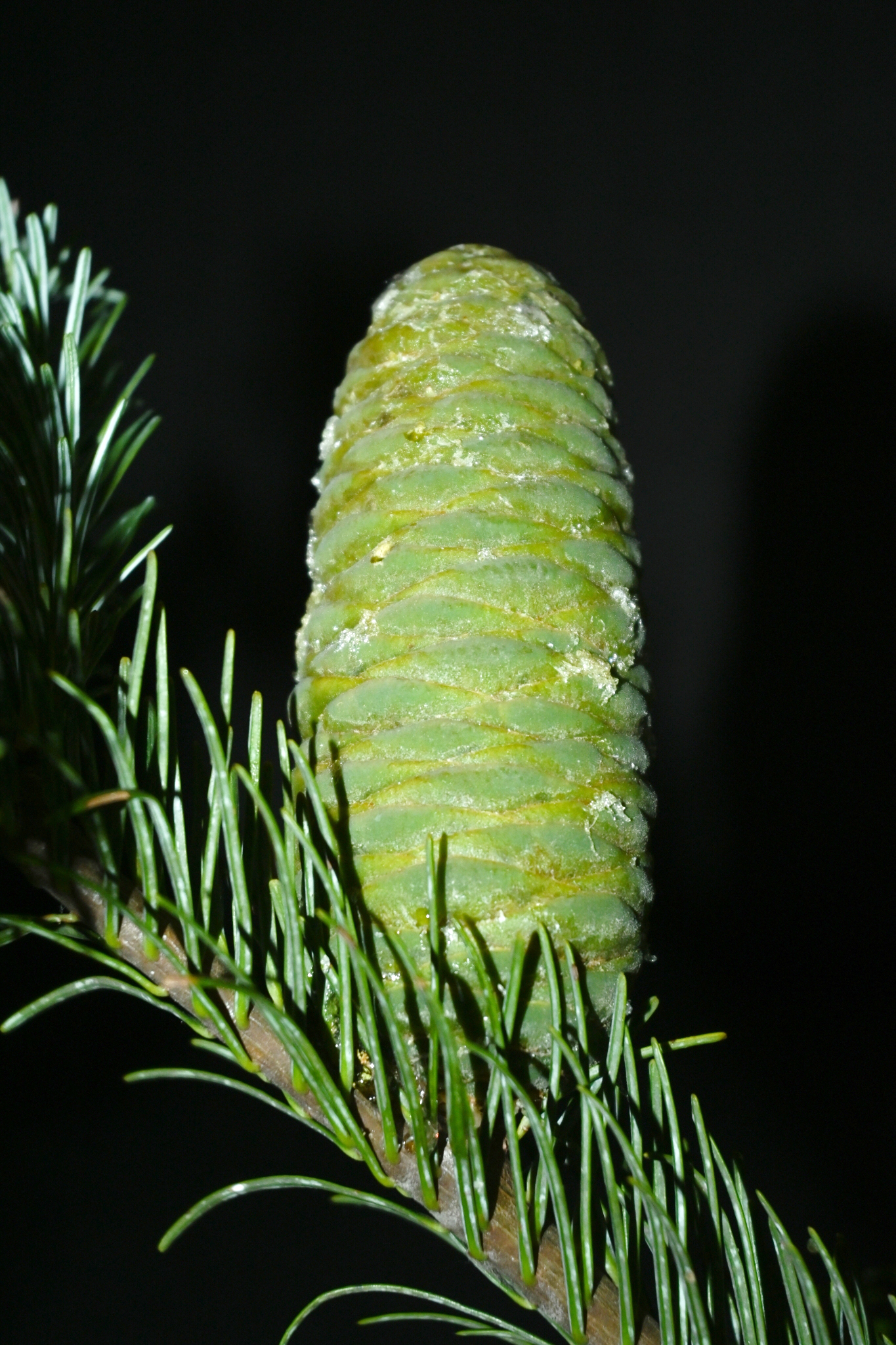
Immature cone with included bracts. Late March, Hostotipac, Jalisco.

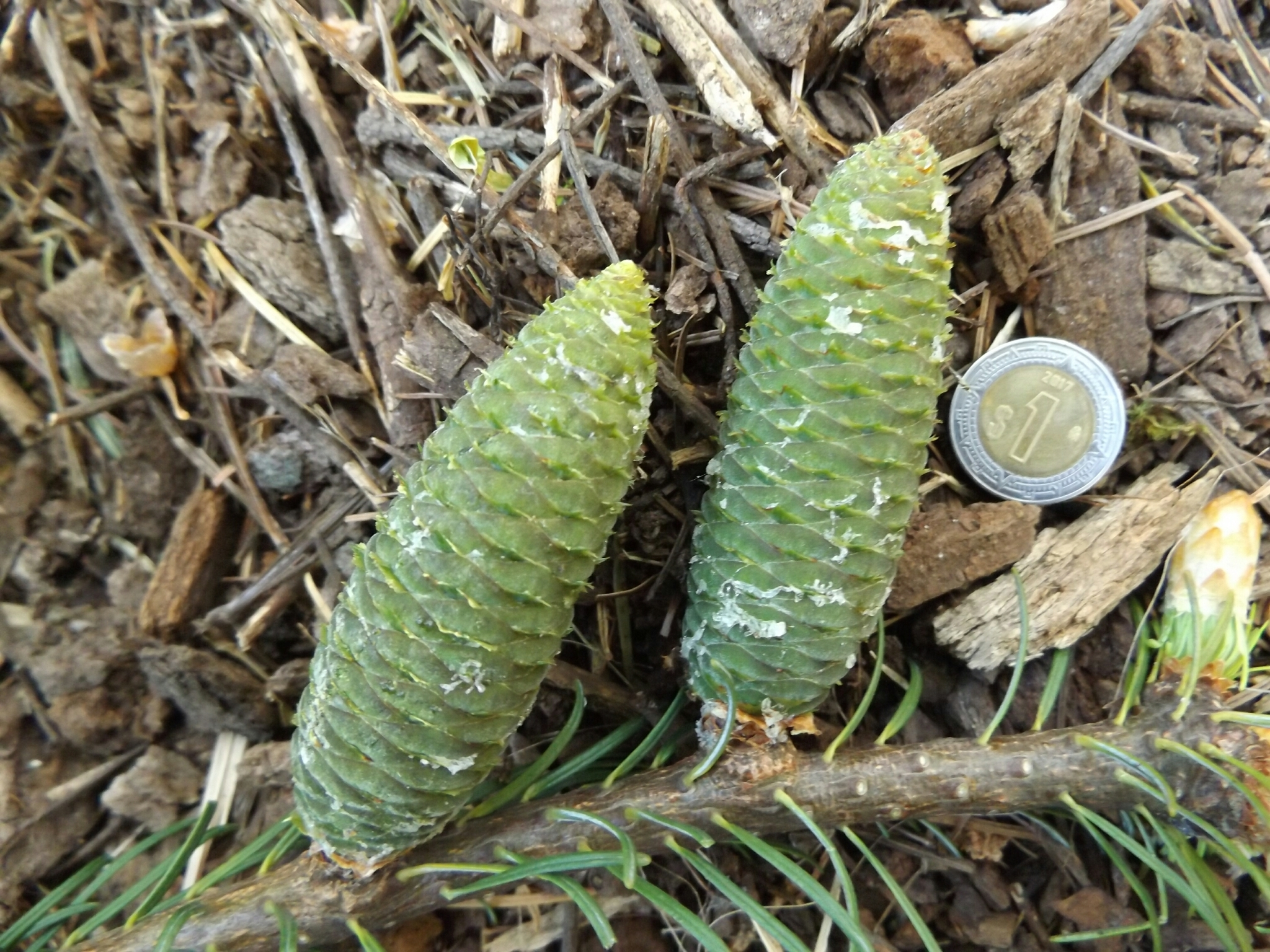
Immature cones with exserted bracts. Late February, Mascota, Jalisco.

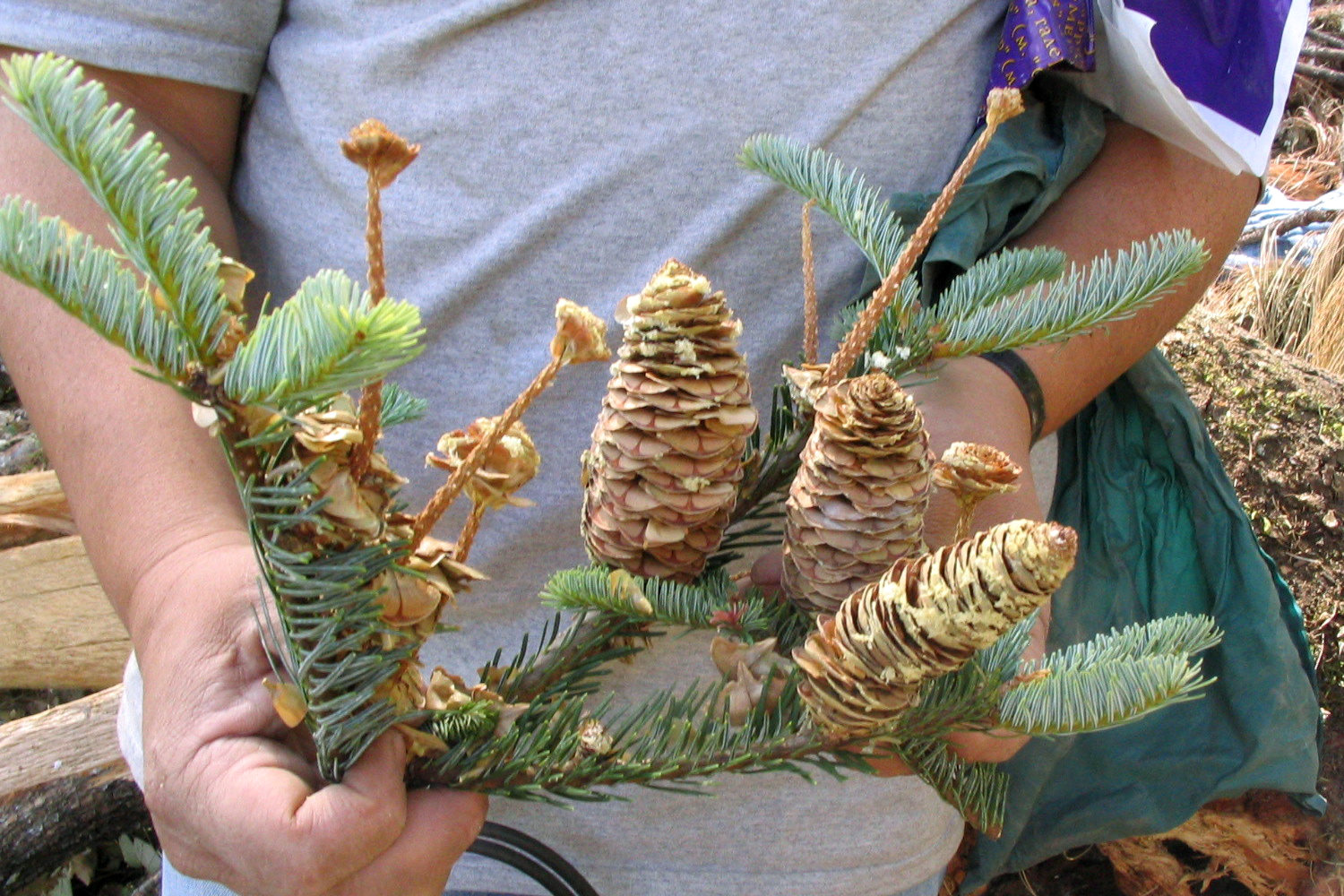
Fully mature cones with exserted bracts, disintegrating to release the seeds. Mid May, Mascota, Jalisco.
