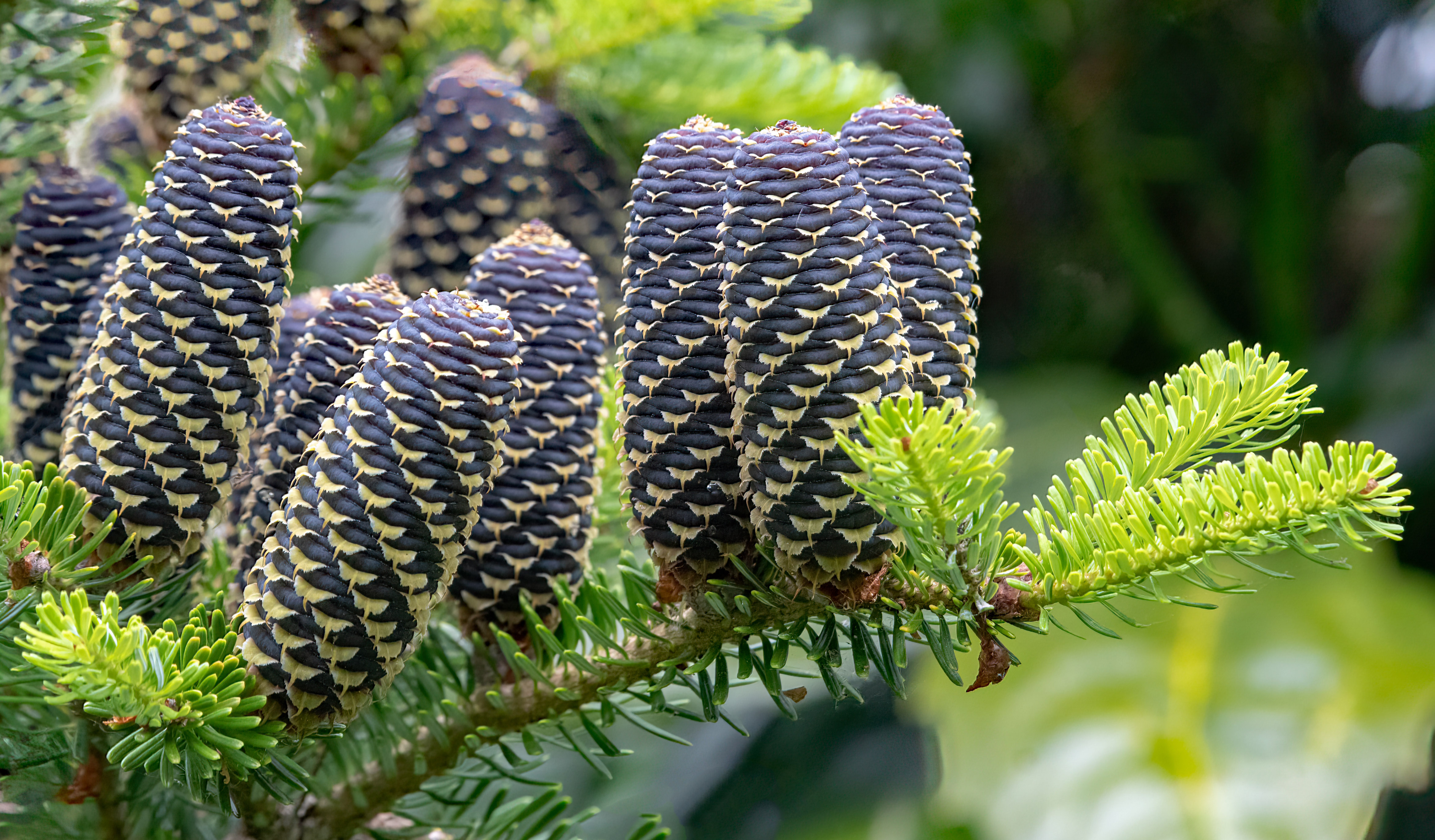
- Cones and foliage of Korean fir (Abies koreana)

Scientific classification
- Kingdom: Plantae
- Clade: Tracheophytes
- Clade: Gymnosperms
- Division: Pinophyta
- Class: Pinopsida
- Order: Pinales
- Family: Pinaceae
- Subfamily: Abietoideae
- Genus: Abies; Mill.

Type species
- Abies alba Mill.

Species
- See text

Synonyms
- Peuce Richard 1810

= Fir =

Fir Temporal range: 49–0 Ma Eocene - Present

Genus of coniferous trees

Firs are coniferous trees belonging to the genus Abies (Latin: [ˈabieːs]) in the family Pinaceae. They are tall trees that can be distinguished from other members of the pine family by the way in which their needle-like leaves are attached singly to the branches with a circular base, and by their cones, which, like those of cedars, stand upright on the branches like candles and disintegrate at maturity.

There are approximately 48–65 extant species, found on mountains throughout much of North and Central America, Eurasia, and North Africa. The genus is most closely related to Keteleeria, a small genus confined to eastern Asia.

The wood of firs is used for pulp to make paper, for plywood, and for indoor construction. Some species serve as Christmas trees, while others are used as decorative trees with their brightly coloured cones. In art, Lucas Cranach the Elder painted Madonna under the fir tree for Wrocław Cathedral in 1510.

== Description ==
Fir trees are tall, often 40–60 metres (130–200 feet) and sometimes approaching 100 m (330 ft) high, usually with a single straight trunk. The crown starts conical, but becomes more varied in shape with age. The primary branches are arranged in whorls around the trunk.

=== Leaves ===
Firs have needle-like evergreen leaves, arranged spirally but often appearing to be in two or more rows on opposite sides of the twigs. The base of each leaf is round and attached to a small pit in the twig. Each leaf is normally twisted at its base so that the side with stomata faces downwards. In the upper crown on cone-bearing branches, the leaves are shorter, curved, and sometimes sharp. The leaves of most firs range between flat and radial, often with longer leaves at the sides, and shorter leaves above the shoot.

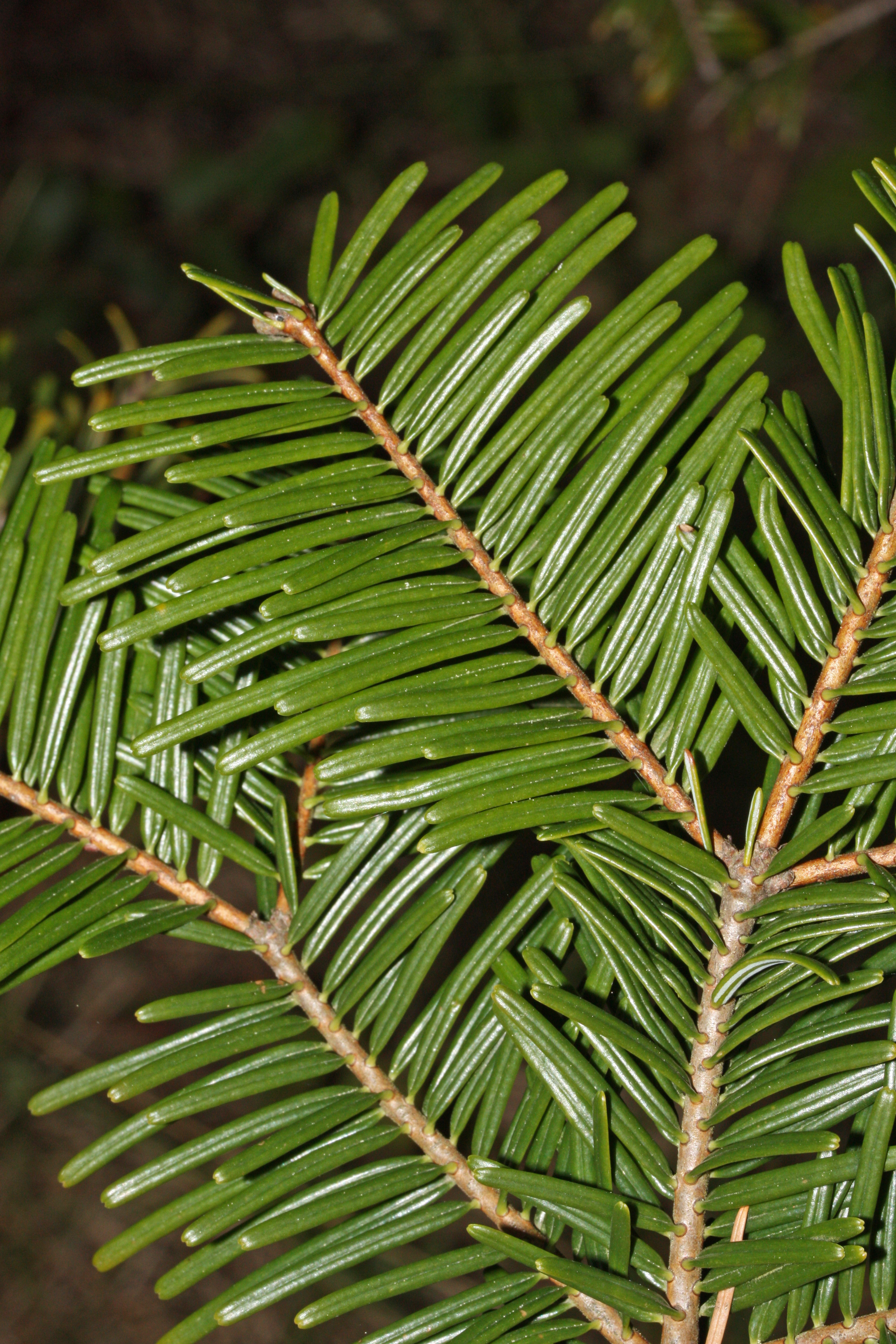
Flat foliage of A. grandis (shown from above)

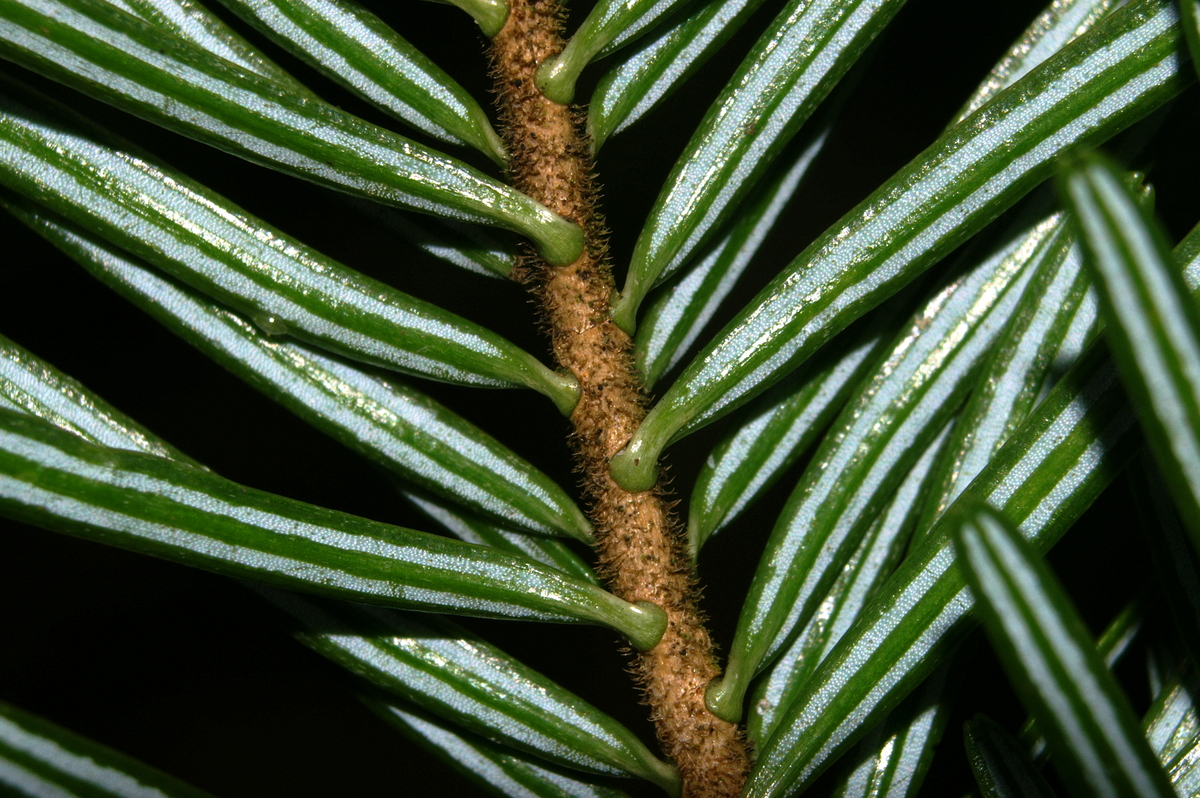
A. alba leaf undersides showing two whitish strips formed by wax-covered stomatal bands and bases shaped like suction cups

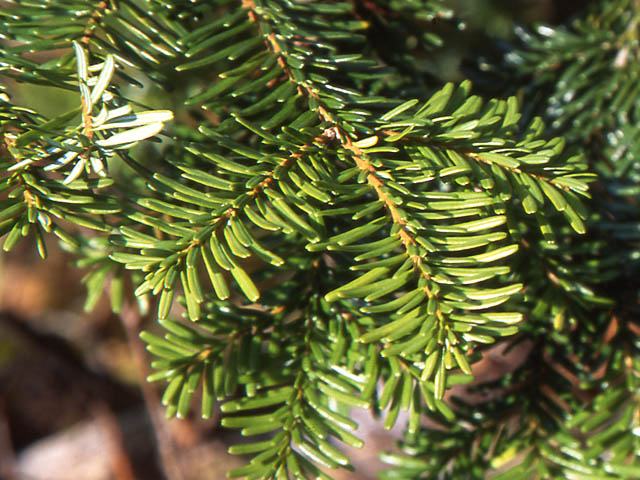
Leaves of A. mariesii in Japan

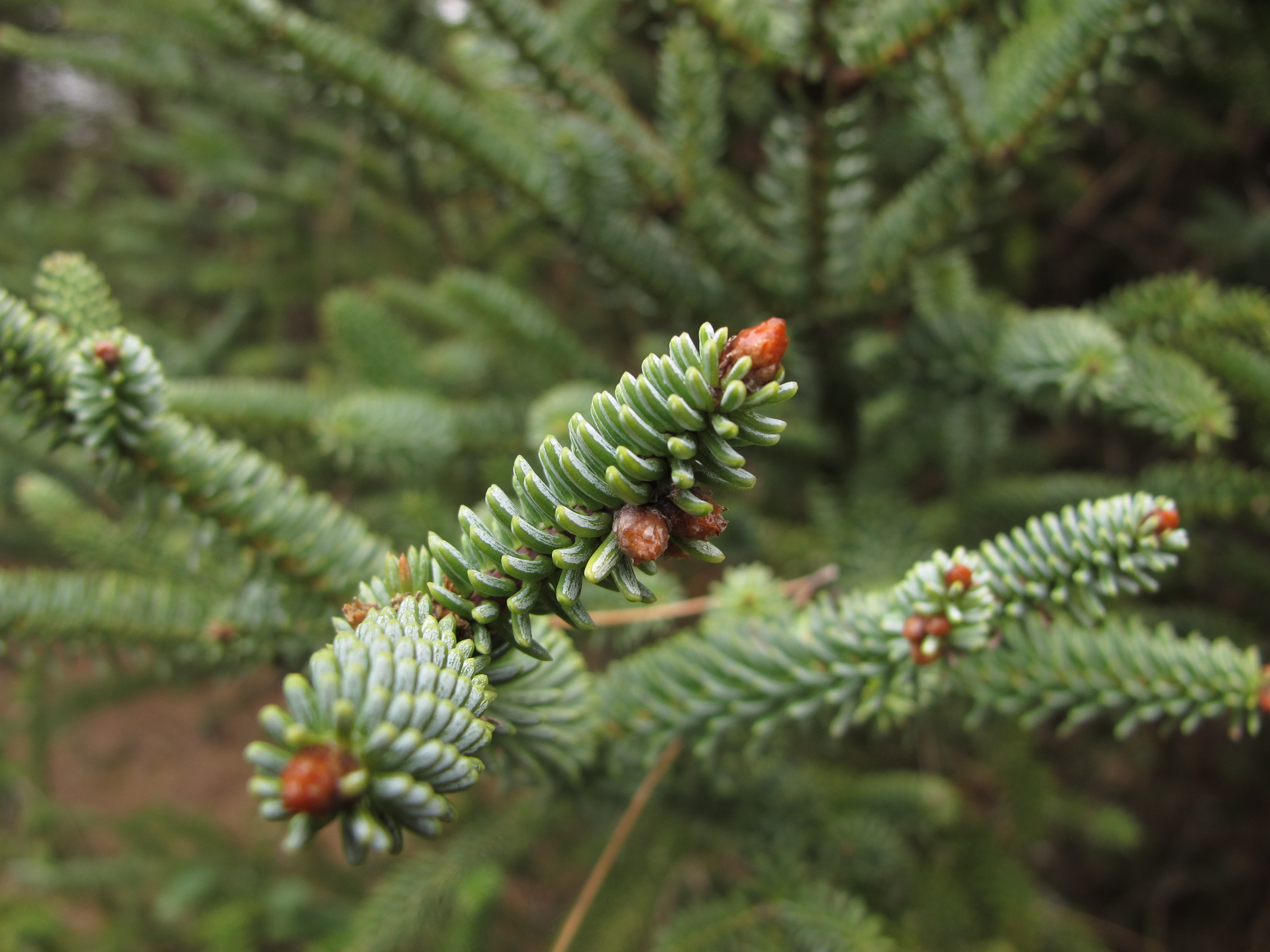
Radial leaf arrangement of A. pinsapo

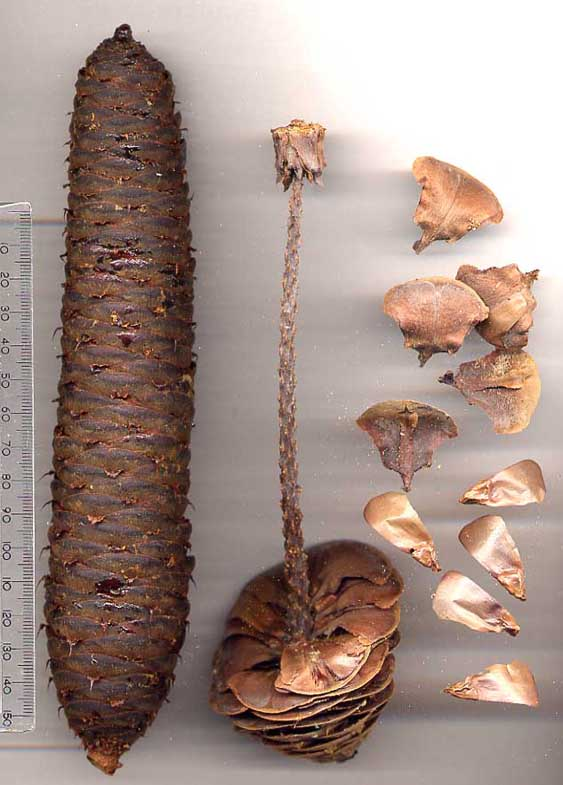
Intact and disintegrated Bulgarian fir cones

=== Cones ===
Firs differ from other conifers such as spruces in having erect, cylindrical female seed cones 5–25 cm (2–10 in) long that disintegrate at maturity to release the winged seeds. Seed cones take a year to become mature; they start out green or other bright colour, darkening as they develop to dark brown or black. The leaflike seed bracts are visible when young, and in some species remain so. The seeds sit in thin cups; each seed has a triangle-shaped wing.

The male cones are pendulous (dangling) and resemble catkins; both pollen and seeds are wind-dispersed.

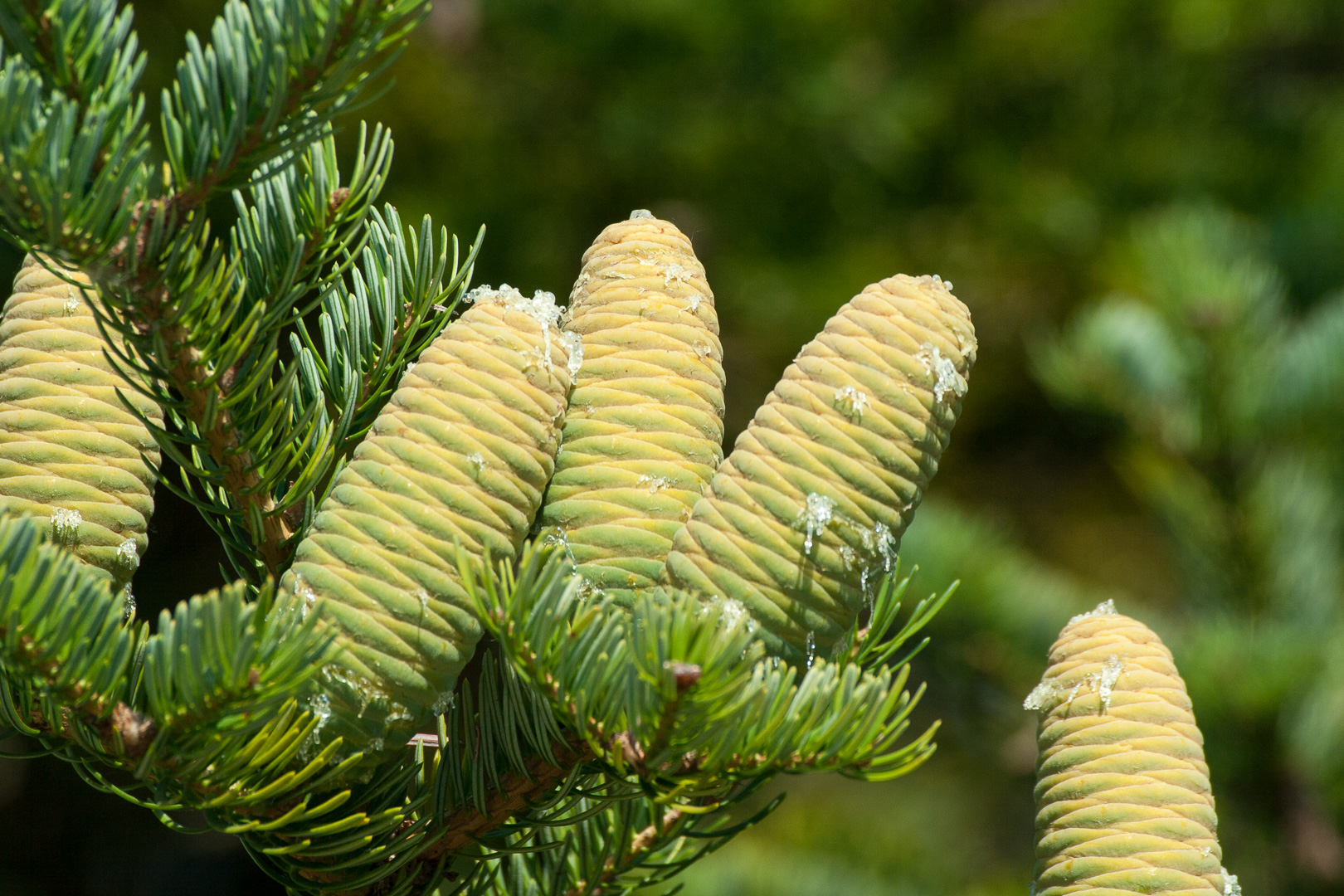
Immature cones of some species are green; here Manchurian fir Abies holophylla

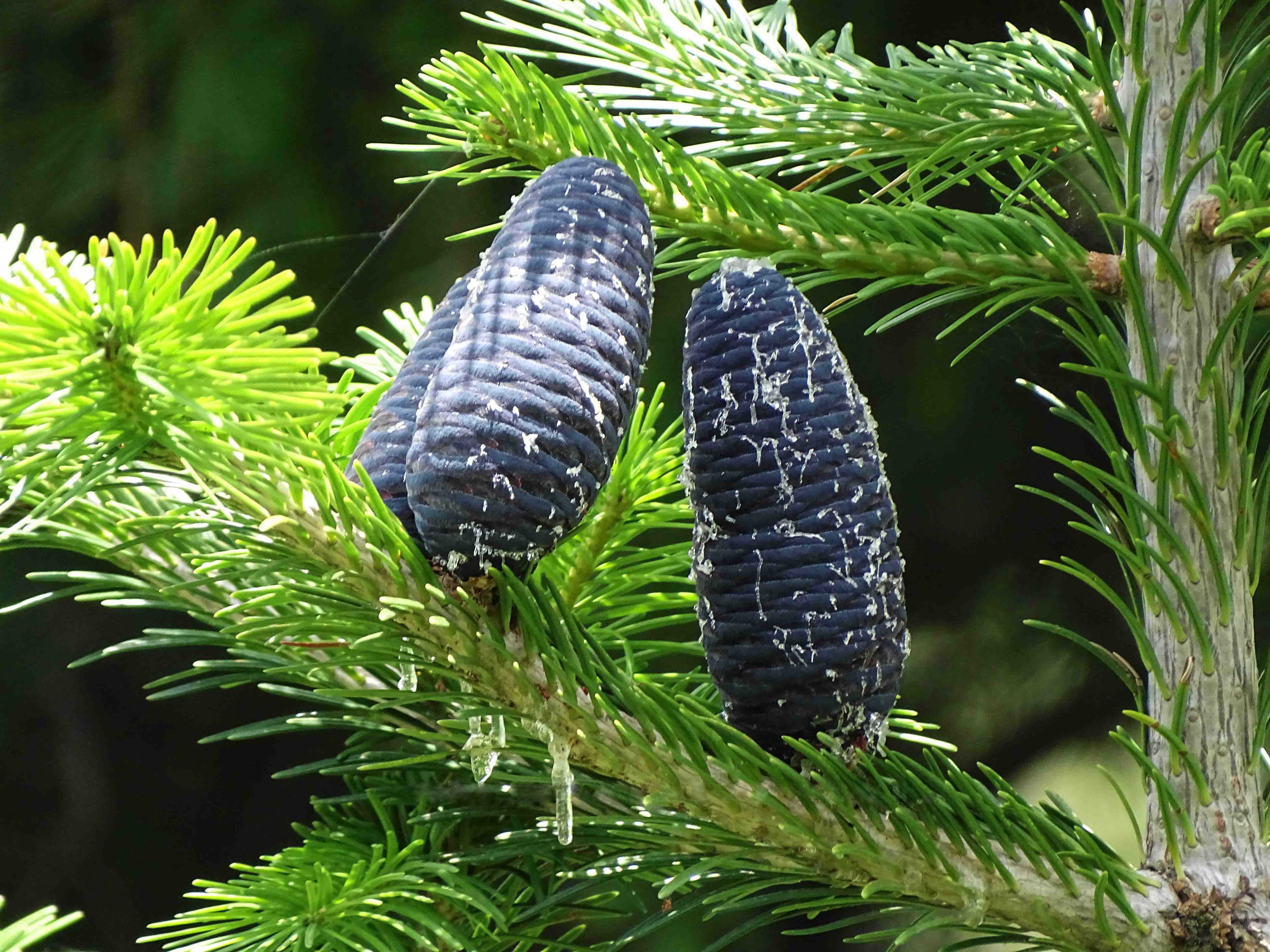
Pindrow fir Abies pindrow with dark purple cones

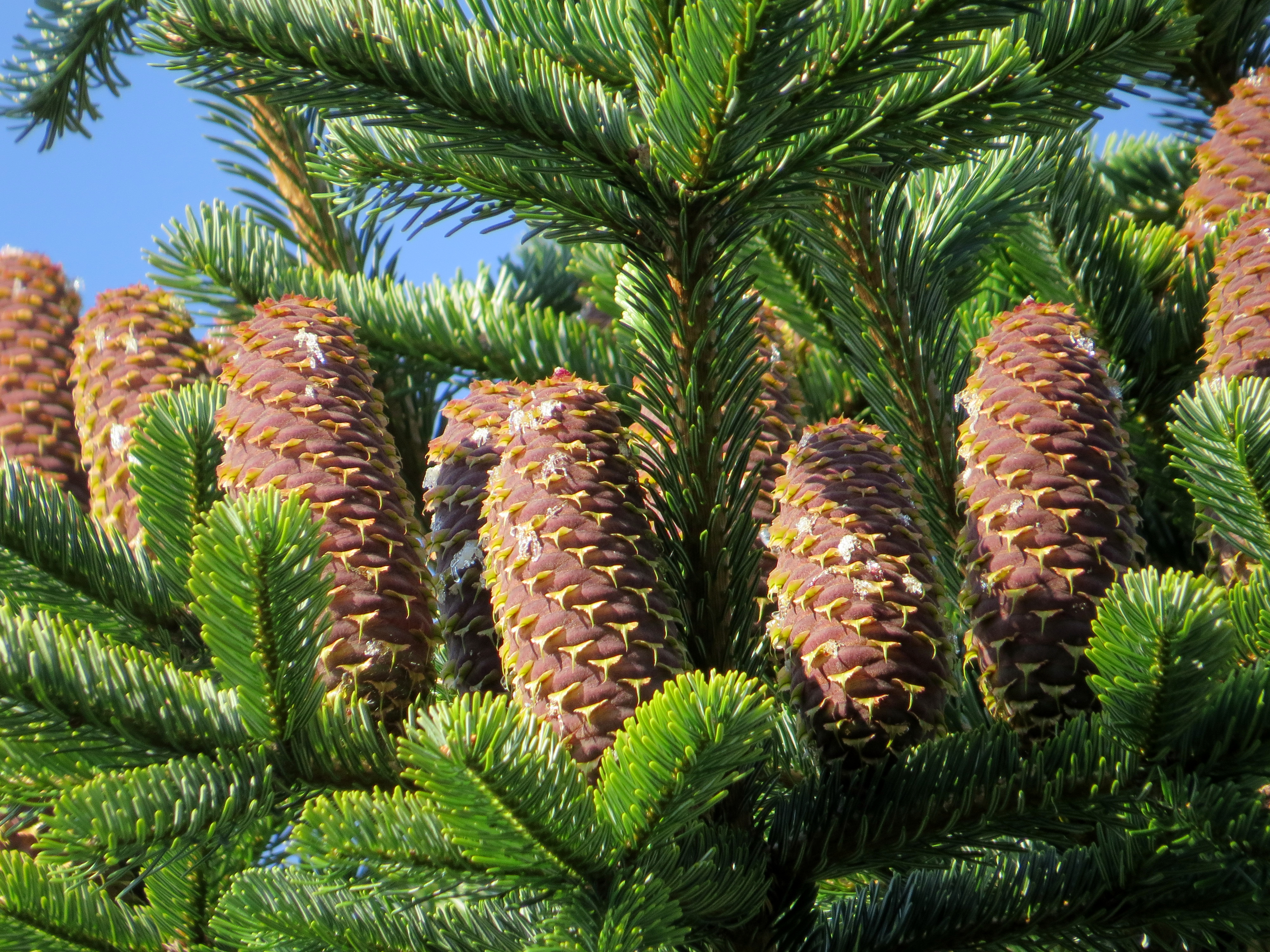
Caucasian fir Abies nordmanniana young cones with reddish scales and yellow-green bracts

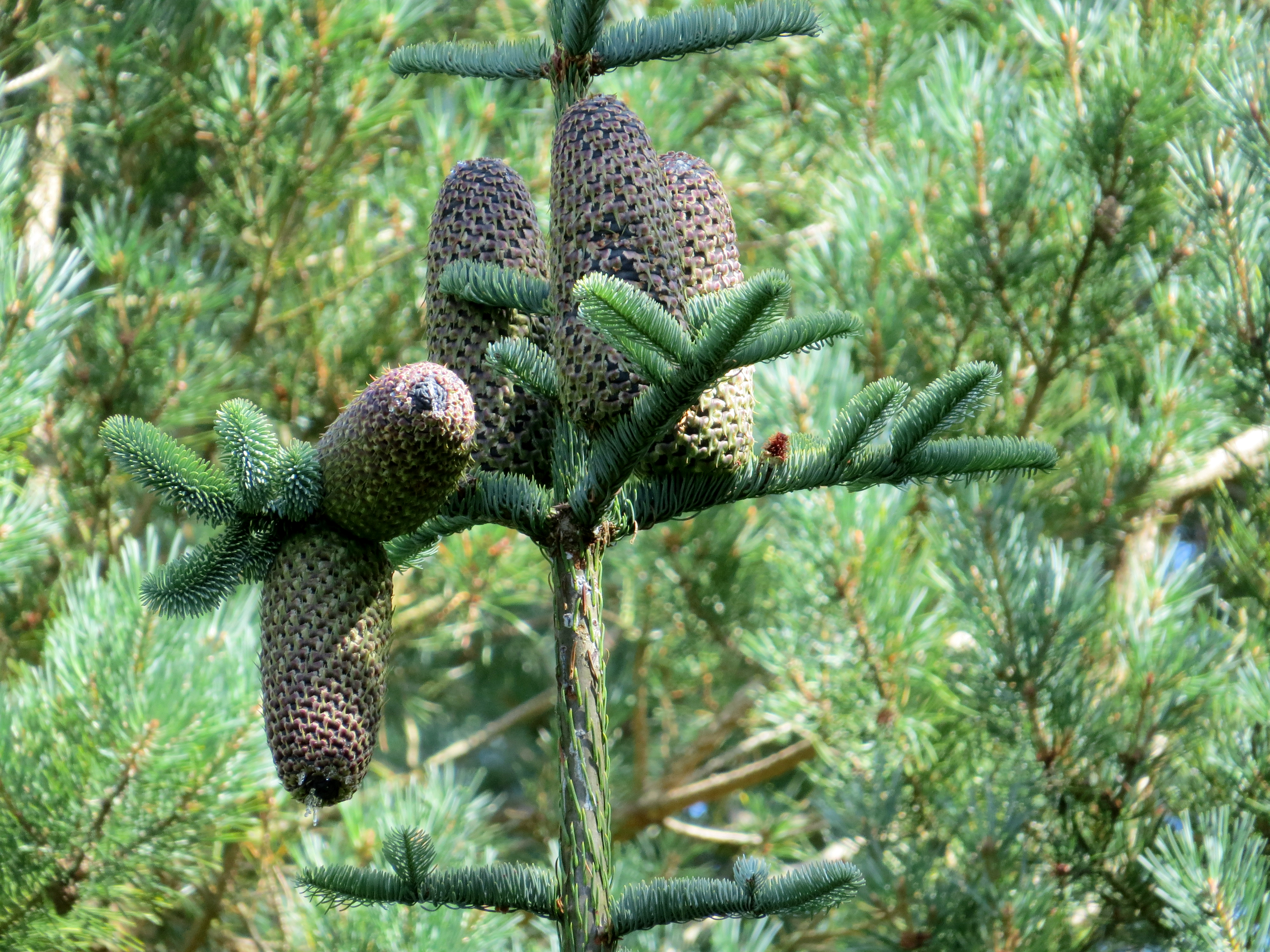
Noble fir Abies procera, with five heavy (20 cm, approx 0.5 kg each) seed cones

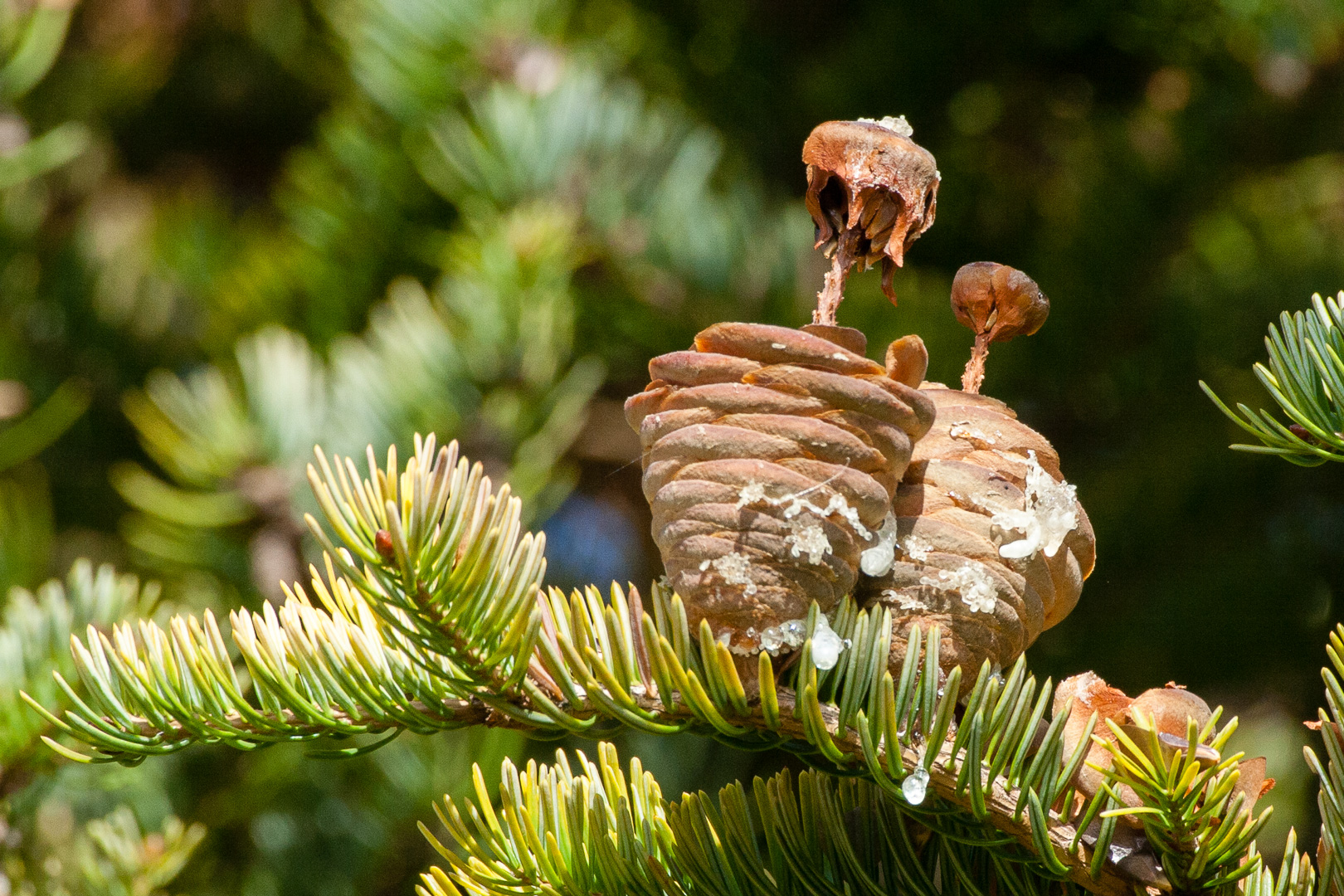
Disintegrating cones of Manchurian fir

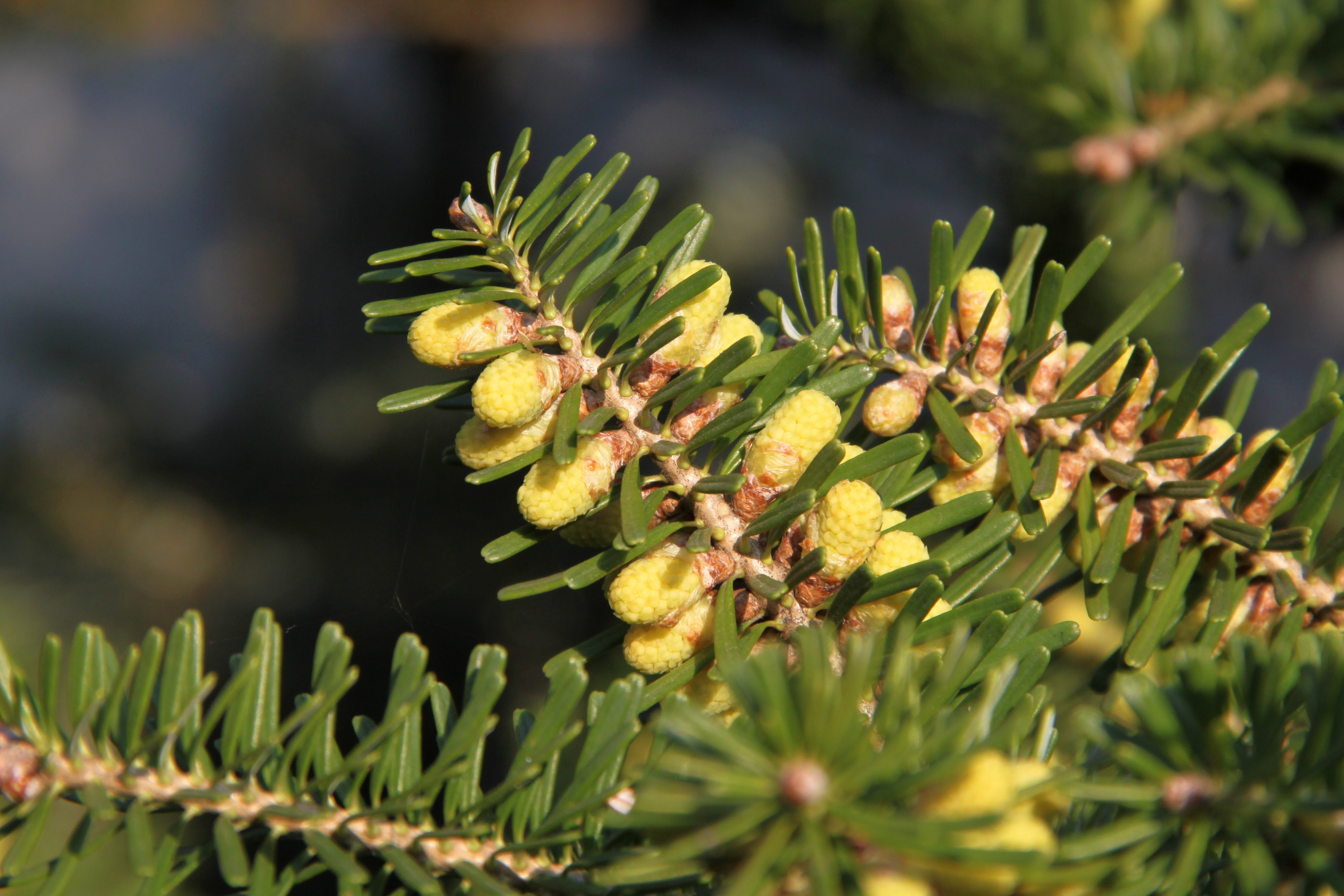
Pollen cones

== Taxonomy ==
=== Taxonomic history ===
In 1754, Philip Miller set up the genus Abies; he also defined the type species Abies alba. In 1878, George Engelmann classified only a part of the genus; Heinrich Mayr did the same in 1890, as did the German botanist Wilhelm Patschke in 1913. The classifications by Paul Robert Hickel in 1906 to 1908, and by P. Landry in 1984, made use only of a subset of the available morphological characteristics. In 1990 and 2001, the Dutch botanist Aljos Farjon attempted a more complete classification; he accepted 48 species within the genus; in 2017 he reduced this to 46. Adopting a different approach, in 2011 Z. Debreczy and I. Rácz treated the genus as containing 67 species.

=== Species ===
As of September 2025, Plants of the World Online accepted 49 species. The sections are based on Stull et al. 2021.

==== Section Abies ====
Found in central, south, and eastern Europe and Asia Minor.

- Abies alba – silver fir or European silver fir
- Abies borisii-regis – Bulgarian fir
- Abies cephalonica – Greek fir
- Abies cilicica – Syrian fir
- Abies nebrodensis – Sicilian fir
- Abies nordmanniana – Caucasian fir or Nordmann fir
  - Abies nordmanniana subsp. equi-trojani – Turkish fir
- Abies numidica – Algerian fir
- Abies pinsapo – Spanish fir
  - Abies pinsapo var. marocana – Moroccan fir

==== Section Balsamea ====
Found in northern Asia and North America, and high mountains further south.

- Abies balsamea – balsam fir
  - Abies balsamea var. phanerolepis – bracted balsam fir
- Abies fraseri – Fraser's fir
- Abies koreana – Korean fir
- Abies lasiocarpa – subalpine fir
  - Abies lasiocarpa var. arizonica – corkbark fir
  - Abies lasiocarpa var. bifolia – Rocky Mountains subalpine fir
- Abies nephrolepis – Khinghan fir
- Abies sachalinensis – Sakhalin fir
- Abies sibirica – Siberian fir
  - Abies sibirica var. semenovii
- Abies veitchii – Veitch's fir
  - Abies veitchii var. sikokiana – Shikoku fir

==== Section Grandis ====
Found in western North America to Mexico, Guatemala, Honduras and El Salvador, in lowlands in the north, moderate altitudes in south.

- Abies grandis – grand fir or giant fir
  - Abies grandis var. grandis – Coast grand fir
  - Abies grandis var. idahoensis – interior grand fir
- Abies concolor – white fir
  - Abies concolor subsp. concolor – Rocky Mountain white fir or Colorado white fir
  - Abies concolor subsp. lowiana – Low's white fir or Sierra Nevada white fir
- Abies durangensis – Durango fir
  - Abies durangensis var. coahuilensis – Coahuila fir
- Abies flinckii – Jalisco fir
- Abies guatemalensis – Guatemalan fir
  - Abies guatemalensis var. guatemalensis
  - Abies guatemalensis var. jaliscana
- Abies vejarii

==== Section Momi ====
Found in east and central Asia and the Himalaya, generally at low to moderate altitudes.

- Abies kawakamii – Taiwan fir
- Abies homolepis – Nikko fir
- Abies recurvata – Min fir
  - Abies recurvata var. ernestii – Min fir
- Abies firma – Momi fir
- Abies beshanzuensis – Baishanzu fir
- Abies holophylla – Manchurian fir
- Abies chensiensis – Shensi fir
  - Abies chensiensis subsp. salouenensis – Salween fir
- Abies pindrow – Pindrow fir
- Abies ziyuanensis – Ziyuan fir

==== Section Amabilis ====
Found in the Pacific Coast mountains in North America and Japan, in high rainfall areas.

- Abies amabilis – Pacific silver fir
- Abies mariesii – Maries' fir

==== Section Pseudopicea ====
Found in the Sino – Himalayan mountains at high altitudes.

- Abies delavayi – Delavay's fir
  - Abies delavayi var. nukiangensis
  - Abies delavayi var. motuoensis
  - Abies delavayi subsp. fansipanensis
- Abies fabri – Faber's fir
  - Abies fabri subsp. minensis
- Abies forrestii – Forrest's fir
- Abies densa – Bhutan fir
- Abies spectabilis – East Himalayan fir
- Abies fargesii – Farges' fir
- Abies fanjingshanensis – Fanjingshan fir
- Abies yuanbaoshanensis – Yuanbaoshan fir
- Abies squamata – flaky fir

==== Section Oiamel ====
Found in central Mexico at high altitudes.

- Abies religiosa – sacred fir
- Abies hickelii – Hickel's fir
  - Abies hickelii var. oaxacana – Oaxaca fir

==== Section Nobilis ====
Found in the western United States at high altitudes.

- Abies procera – noble fir
- Abies magnifica – red fir
  - Abies magnifica var. shastensis – Shasta red fir

==== Section Bracteata ====
Found on the California coast.

- Abies bracteata – bristlecone fir
- ?†Abies rigida Frank Knowlton - (Priabonian-Chattian; Colorado)

==== Section Incertae sedis ====
- †Abies milleri – (Extinct) Early Eocene
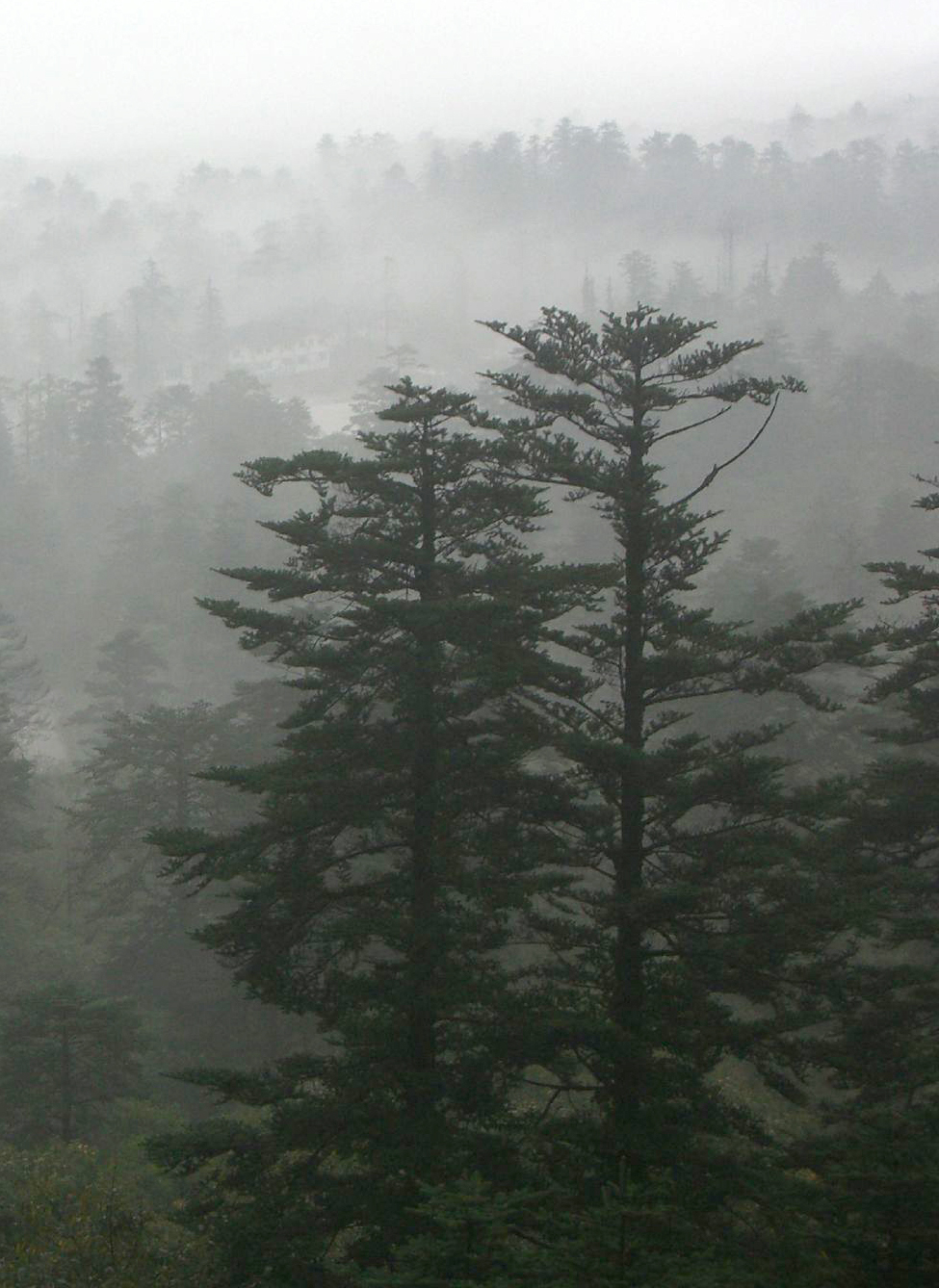
A. fabri, Sichuan, China

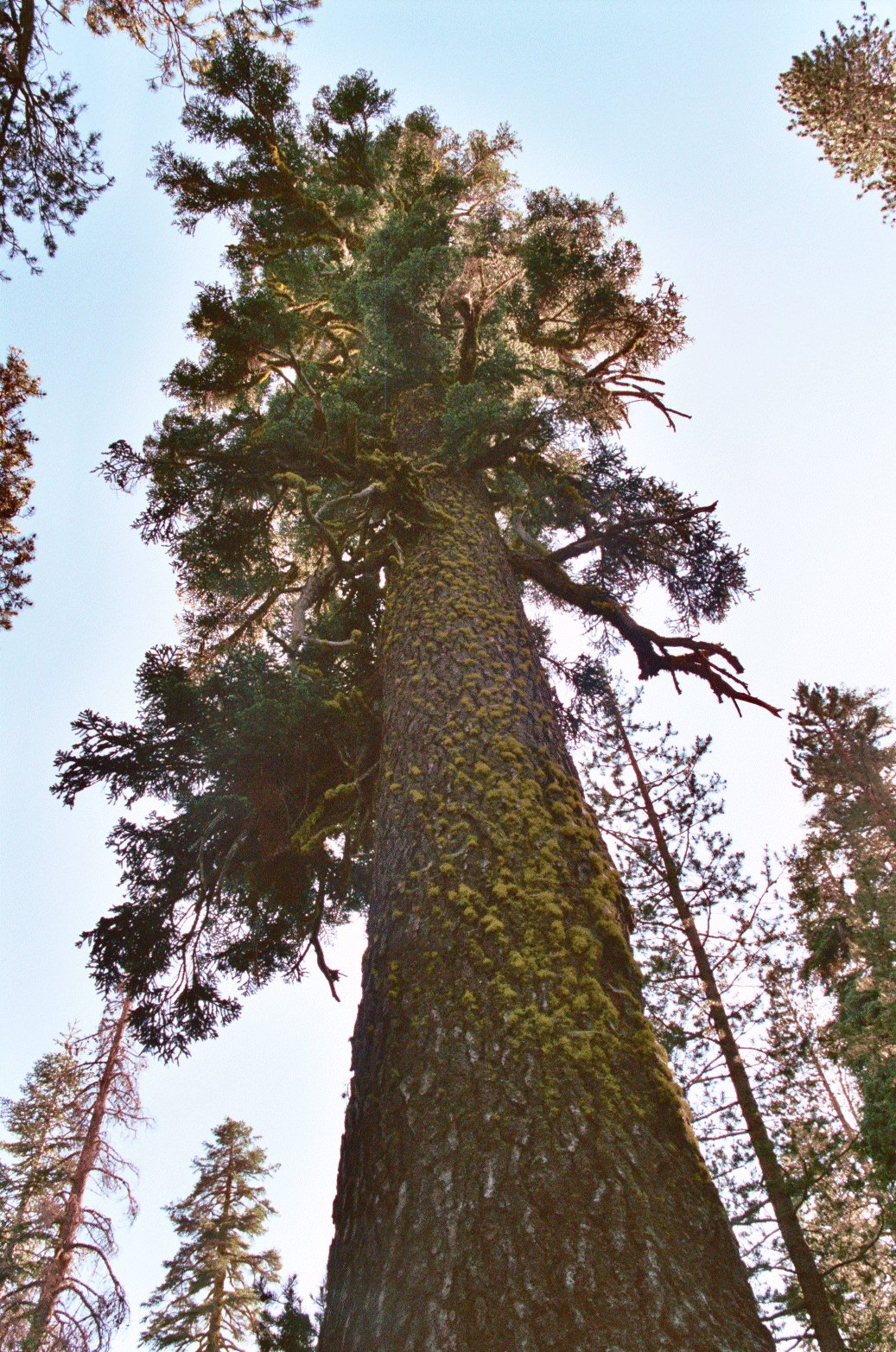
A. magnifica, California

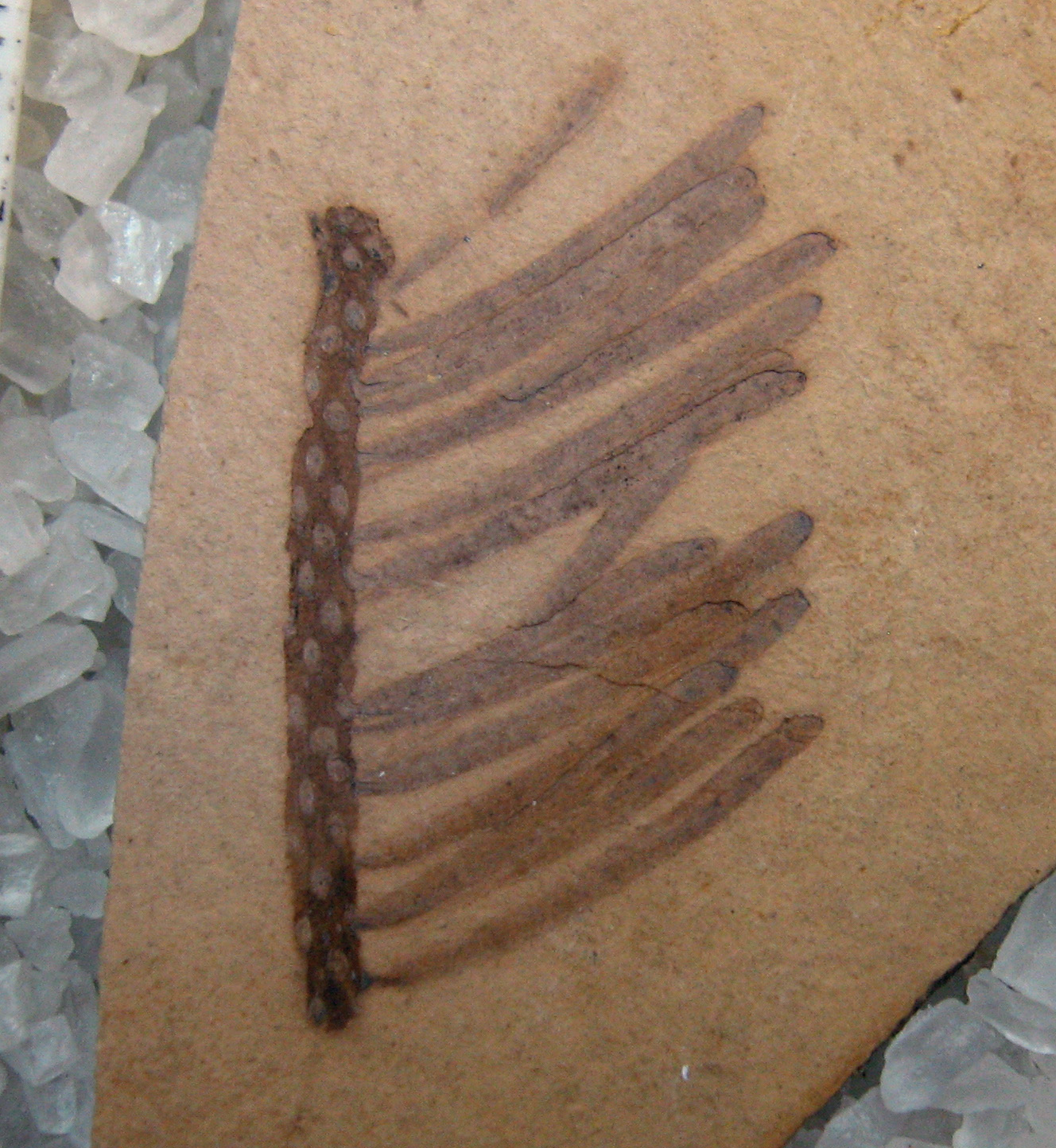
Fossil Abies milleri foliage and axis. Early Eocene, 49.5 mya

=== Fossil history ===
The oldest pollen assignable to the genus dates to the Late Cretaceous in Siberia, with records of leaves and reproductive organs across the Northern Hemisphere from the Eocene onwards.

=== External phylogeny ===
Based on transcriptome analysis, Keteleeria is sister to Abies, with the Pseudolariceae the next nearest relatives.

- Pinaceae
  - Abietoideae (firs and allies)
    - Cedreae
      Cedrus
    - - Pseudolariceae
        - Pseudolarix
        - - Nothotsuga
          - Tsuga
      - Abieteae
        - Keteleeria
        - Abies
  - Pinoideae (pines, larches, etc)

=== Internal phylogeny ===
Phylogeny of Abies based on phylogenomic analysis in 2021:

- Abies
  - - (Pseudotorreya)
      A. bracteata (Don) Poit.
  - - (Religio)
      - - section Amabilis
          - A. mariesii Masters
          - - A. amabilis (Douglas ex Loudon) Forbes
            - A. procera Rehder
      - - section Nobiles
          A. magnifica Murray
        - section Grandis
          - A. concolor (Gordon) Lindley ex Hildebr.
          - - A. jaliscana (Martínez) Mantilla, Shalisko & Vázquez
            - - A. guatemalensis Rehder
              - - A. hickelii Flous & Gaussen
                - - A. flinckii Rushforth
                  - - A. vejarii Martínez
                    - - A. durangensis Martínez
                      - - A. religiosa (Kunth) von Schlechtendal & von Chamisso
                        - - A. hidalgensis Debreczy, Rácz & Guízar
                          - - A. grandis (Douglas ex Don) Lindley
                            - A. lowiana (Gordon) Murray
    - (Abies)
      - - section Abies
          - A. alba Miller
          - - A. pinsapo Boiss.
            - - A. cephalonica Loudon
              - - A. nebrodensis (Lojac.) Mattei
                - - A. nordmanniana (Steven) Spach
                  - - A. numidica de Lannoy ex Carrière
                    - - A. ×borisii-regis Mattf.
                      - A. cilicica (Antoine & Kotschy) Carrière
      - - - section Balsamea
            - A. lasiocarpa (Hooker) Nuttall
            - - A. ernestii Rehder
              - A. balsamea (von Linné) Miller
        - - section Sibiria
            - A. firma Siebold & Zuccarini
            - A. sibirica Ledeb.
          - section Pseudopicea
            - A. fanjingshanensis Huang, Tu & Fang
            - - A. ziyuanensis Fu & Mo
              - - series Squamatae
                  - A. kawakamii (Hayata) Itô
                  - - A. chensiensis van Tieghem
                    - - A. squamata Masters
                      - - A. beshanzuensis Wu
                        - - A. pindrow (Royle ex Don) Royle
                          - - A. recurvata Masters
                            - A. fargesii Franchet
                - series Spectabiles
                  - A. koreana Wilson
                  - - A. nephrolepis (Trautvetter ex Maxim.) Maxim.
                    - - - A. holophylla Maxim.
                        - A. sachalinensis (Schmidt) Masters
                      - - - A. fabri (Masters) Craib
                          - A. veitchii Lindley
                        - - A. fraseri (Pursh) Poiret
                          - - A. delavayi Franchet
                            - - - A. densa Griffith
                                - A. spectabilis (Don) de Mirbel
                              - - A. nukiangensis Cheng & Fu
                                - - A. ferreana Bordères & Gaussen
                                  - - A. forrestii Coltm.-Rog.
                                    - - A. georgei Orr
                                      - - A. homolepis Siebold & Zuccarini
                                        - A. yuanbaoshanensis Lu & Fu

=== Etymology ===
The generic name Abies is the Latin for "fir". The English name "fir" derives from the Old Norse fyri or the Old Danish fyr.

== Distribution and habitat ==
Firs are distributed around the Northern Hemisphere. The genus is native across much of North America, Eurasia, Turkey, Syria, Morocco, and Algeria. It is introduced in Scandinavia and the British Isles. Abies sibirica grows as far north as 67°N in Siberia, while A. guatemalensis grows as far south as 15°N in Central America. Most firs favour cold climates, whether at altitude in mountain ranges or at high latitude. Many species have relict distributions, occupying small areas of what were once much larger distributions. Only a few species are widespread.

Fir forest at high altitude,
Independence Pass, Colorado

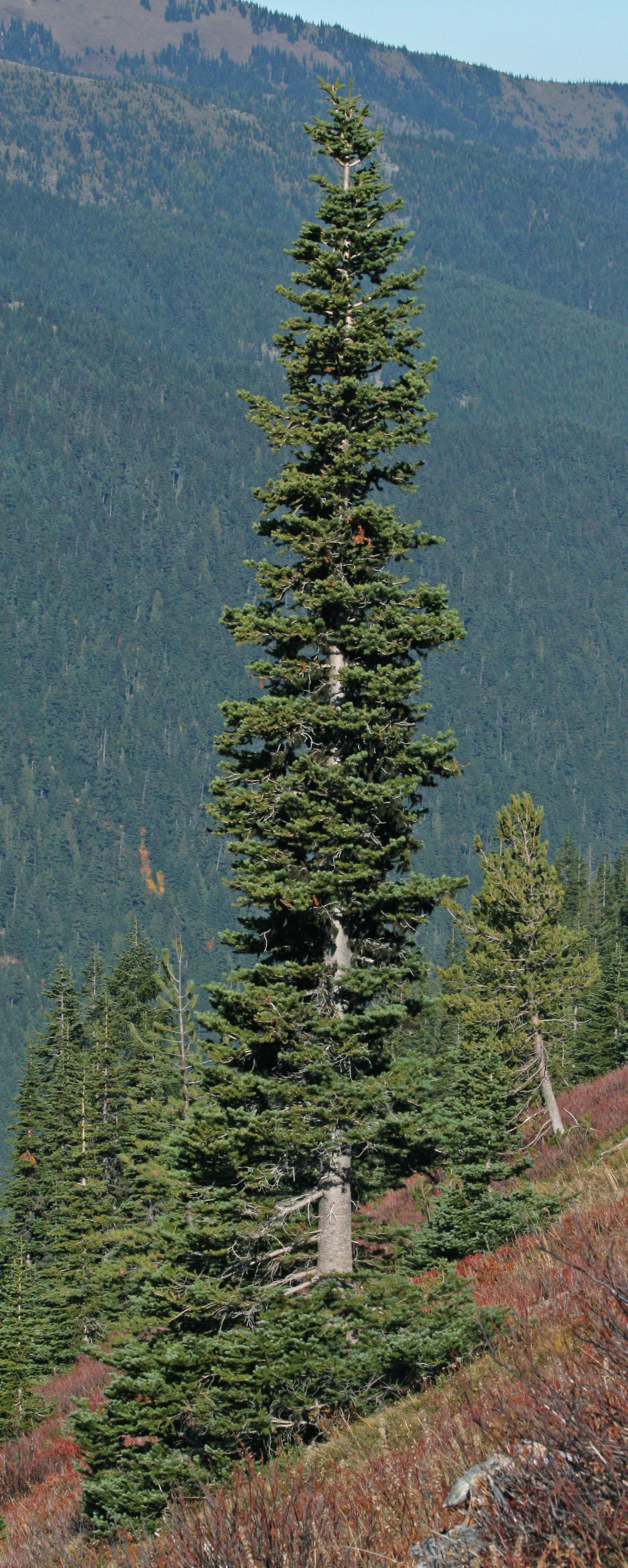
The narrow conical shape and downward-drooping limbs of northern conifers,
like Abies lasiocarpa, help them shed snow.

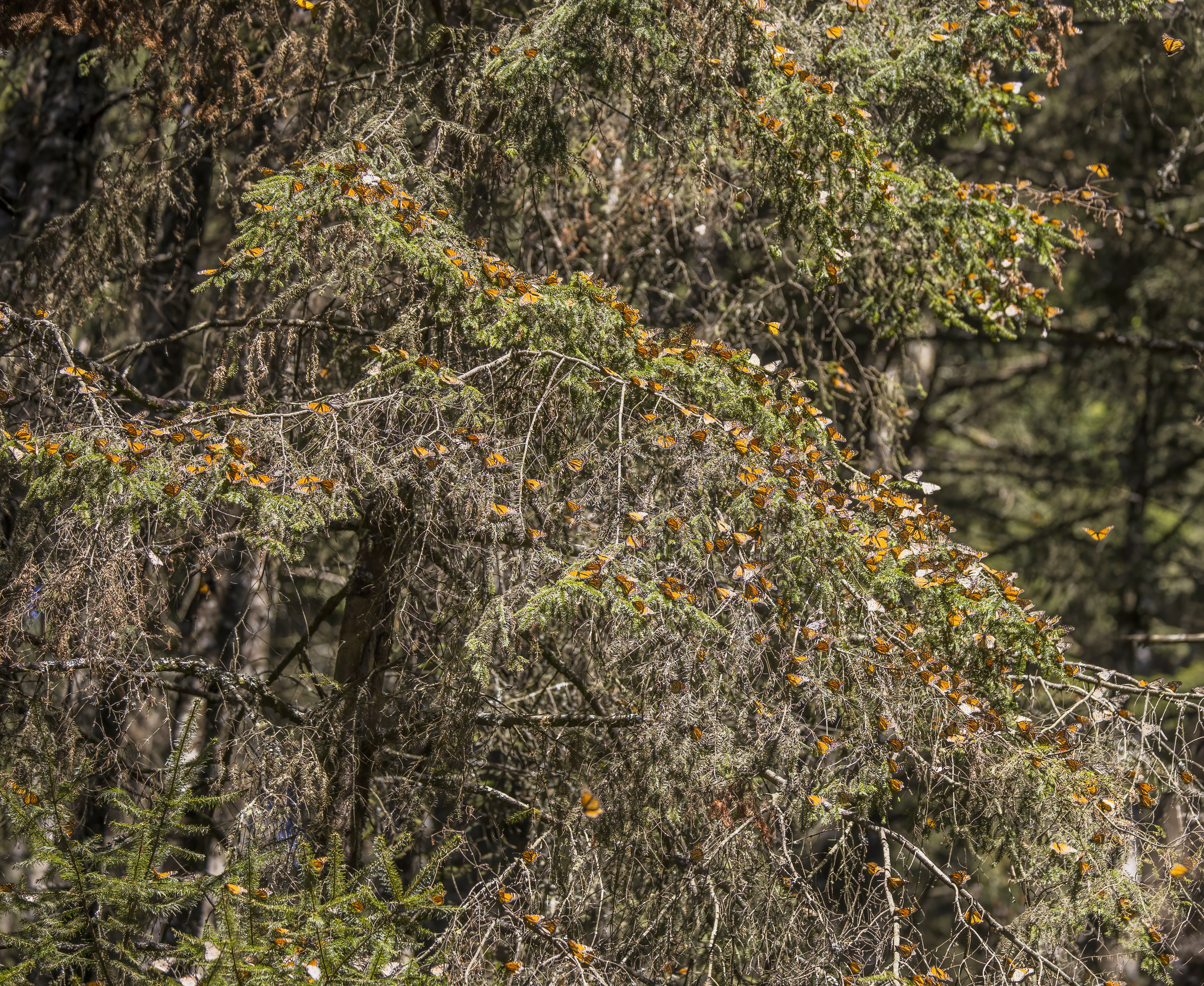
Abies religiosa with roosting monarch butterflies, Valle de Bravo, Mexico

== Ecology ==
Abies religiosa (sacred fir) trees give roosting shelter to overwintering monarch butterflies.

Firs are hosts to a variety of invertebrate pests and fungal diseases. Pest groups include adelgid bugs, aphids, bark beetles, clearwing moths, conifer twig weevils, caterpillars of some moths, nematodes, sawflies, spider mites, and spittlebugs. Diseases of firs include annosus (Heterobasidion) root rot, cankers, and needle cast.

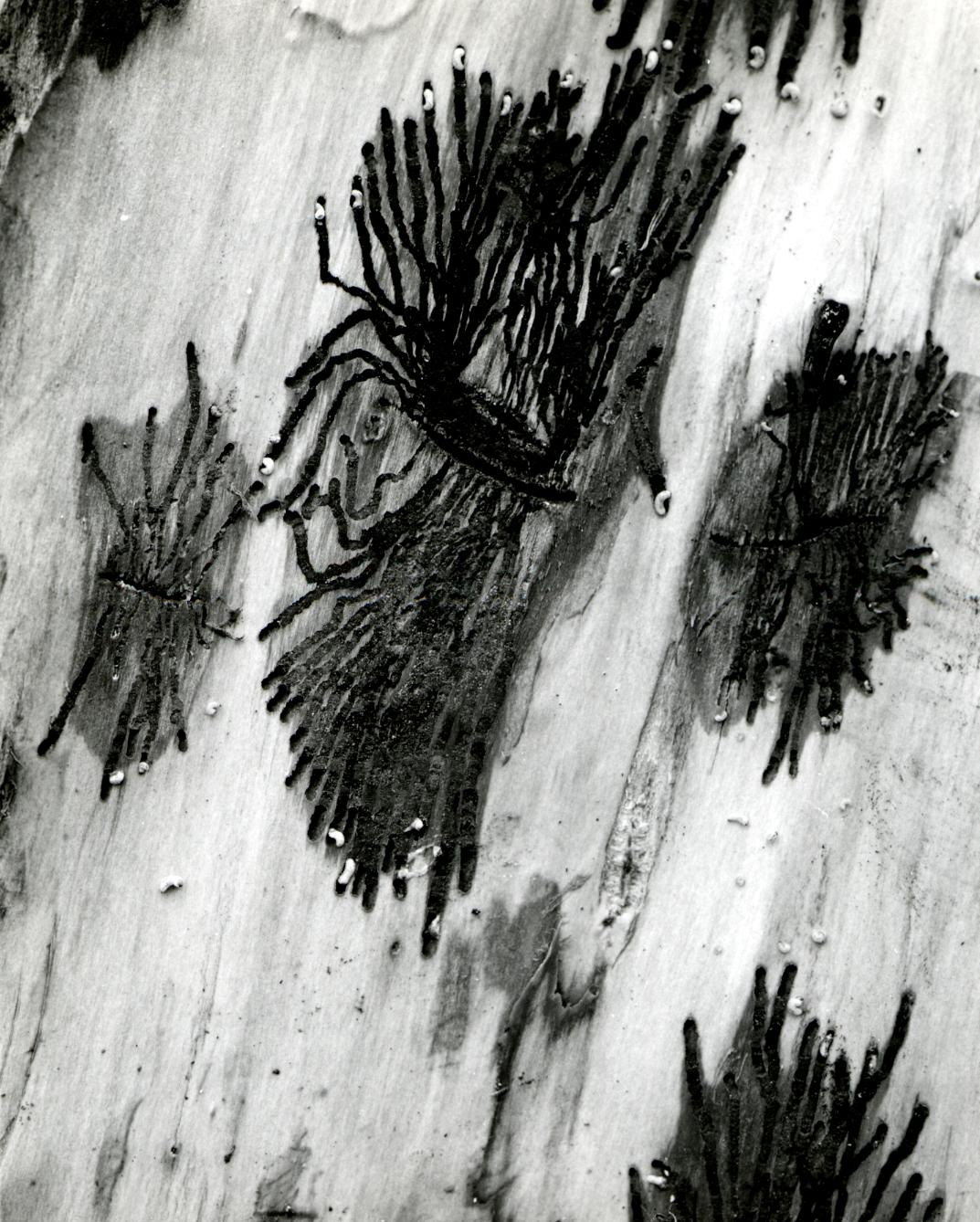
Galleries and larvae of Pseudohylesinus grandis beetles on Abies alba

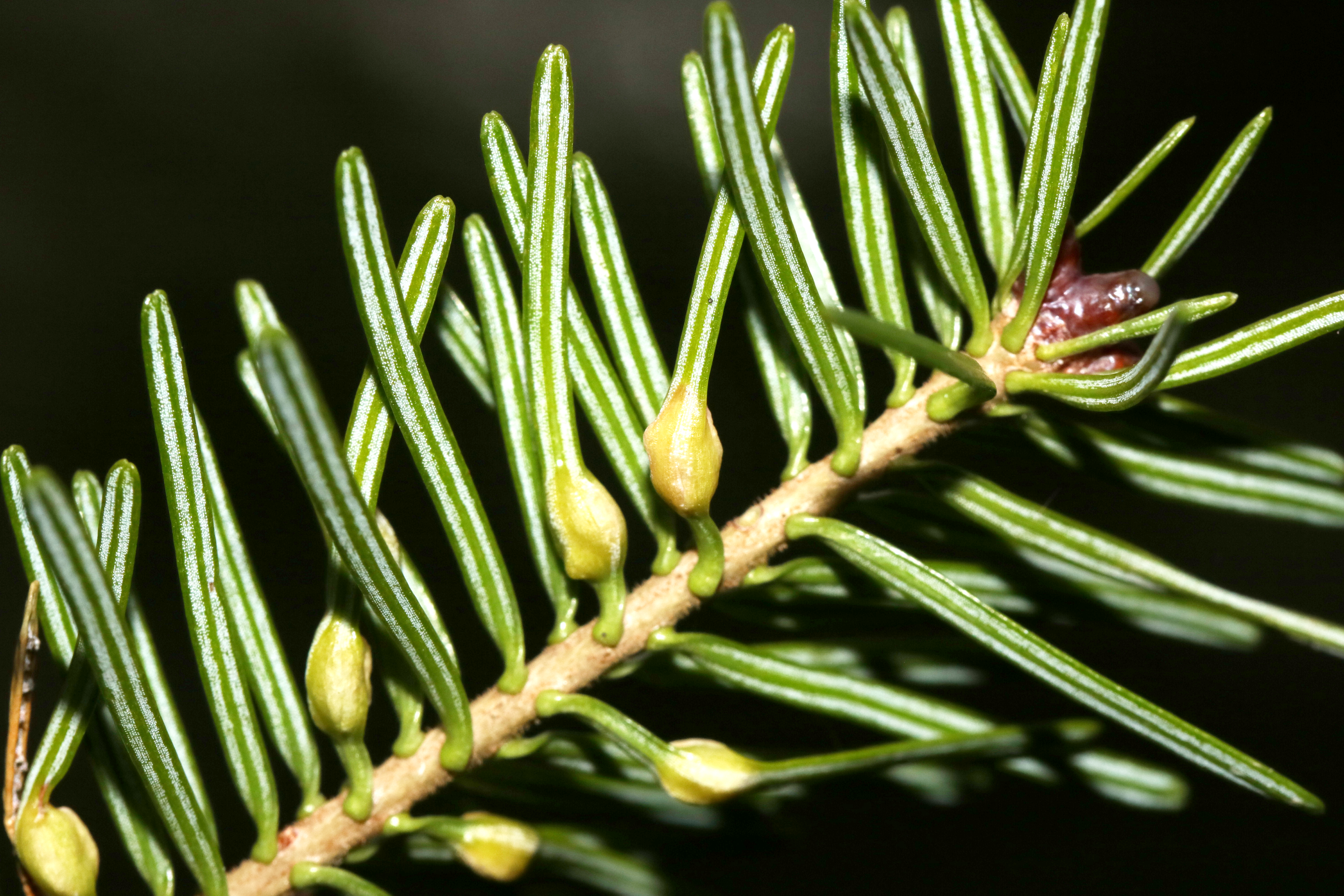
Galls of the gall midge Paradiplosis tumifex in needle leaves of Abies balsamea

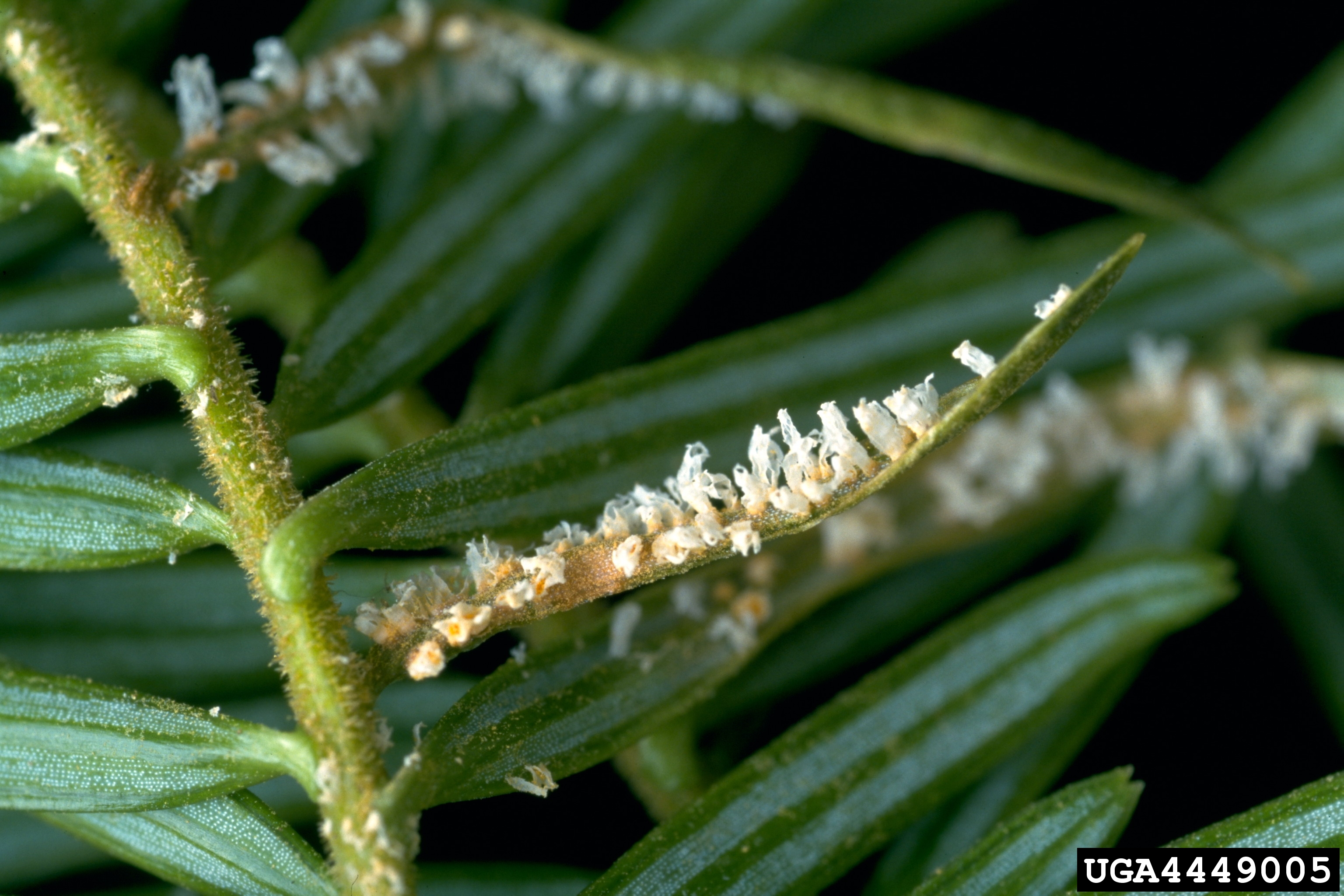
Pucciniastrum epilobii basidiomycete fungus infecting needle leaves of Abies alba

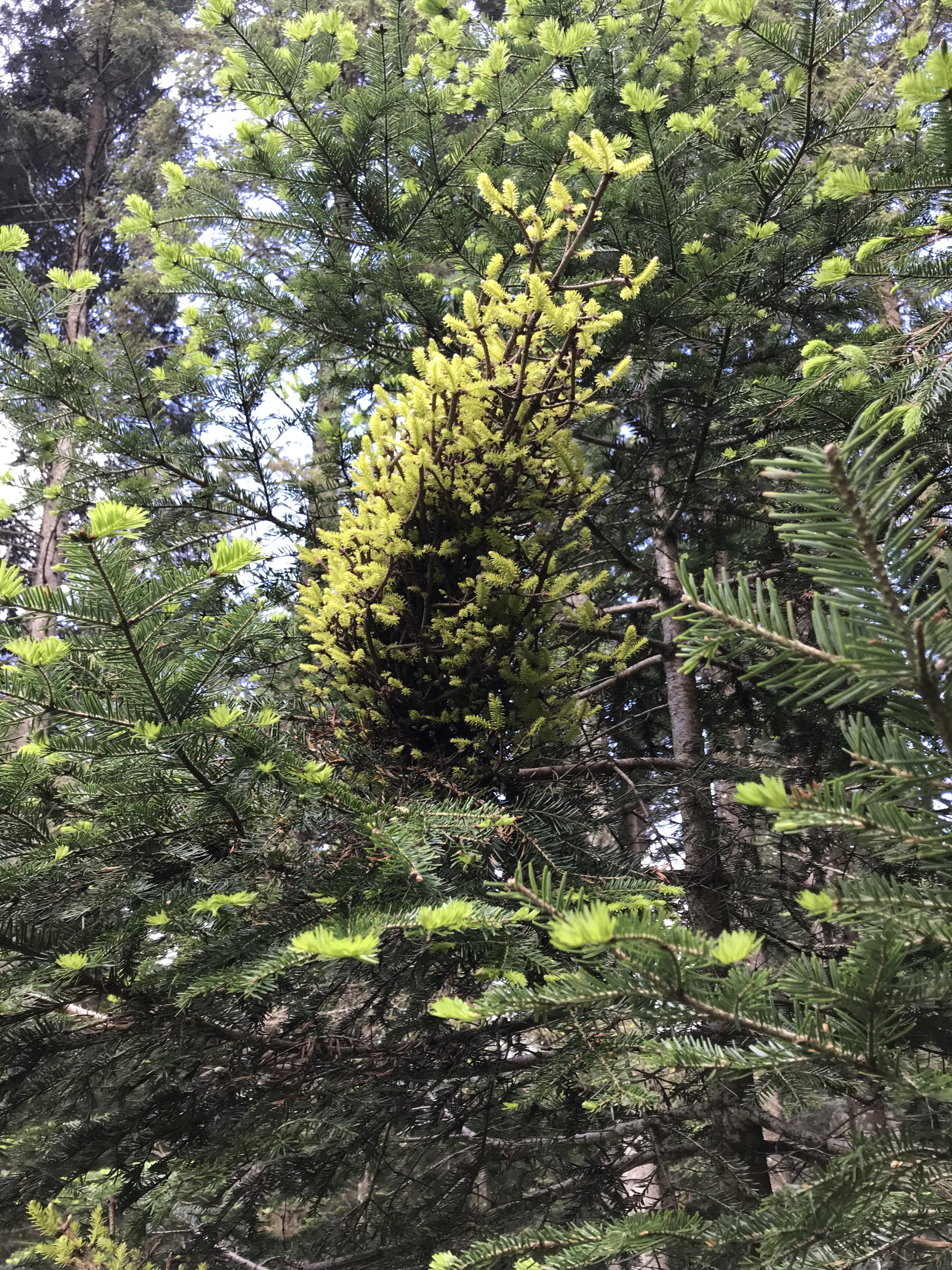
Witch's broom caused by the basidiomycete fungus Melampsorella caryophyllacearum

== Uses ==
Unlike the Douglas fir (Pseudotsuga), firs produce softwood, often used as pulp or for the manufacture of plywood and rough timber. It is commonly used in Canadian Lumber Standard graded wood, used for internal stud walls and similar applications. Abies spectabilis is used in Ayurveda as an antitussive (cough suppressant) drug. Firs produce a variety of terpenoids that could have practical uses. Terpenoid composition of the bark varies by genetics, geography, age and size of the tree.

Caucasian fir, noble fir, Fraser's fir and balsam fir are popular Christmas trees, generally considered to be the best for this purpose, with aromatic foliage that does not shed many needles on drying out. Many form decorative garden trees, notably Korean fir and Fraser's fir, which produce brightly coloured cones even when very young, still only 1–2 m (3 ft 3 in – 6 ft 7 in) tall. Many fir species are grown in botanic gardens and other specialist tree collections in Europe and North America.

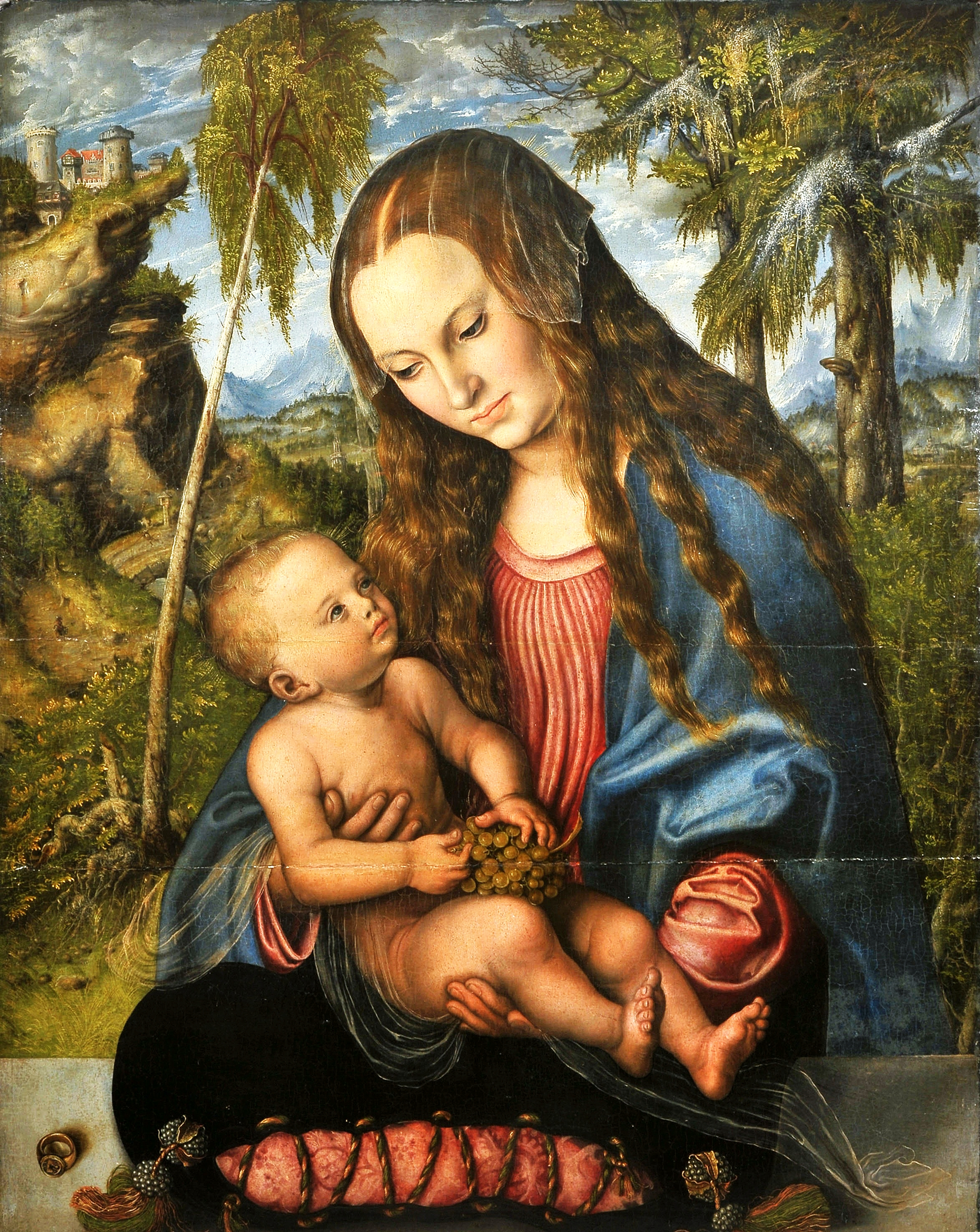
Madonna under the fir tree - Lucas Cranach the Elder, 1510

== In art ==
Lucas Cranach the Elder painted Madonna under the fir tree for Wrocław Cathedral in 1510. The painting was taken to Germany after the Second World War for restoration, but a copy was made and substituted for the original. The forgery was discovered, partly because the copy was on a fir board where the original was on lime wood. The original was returned to Poland in 2012, the most valuable painting to be restituted to the country.

== See also ==
- List of fir species of Denmark
