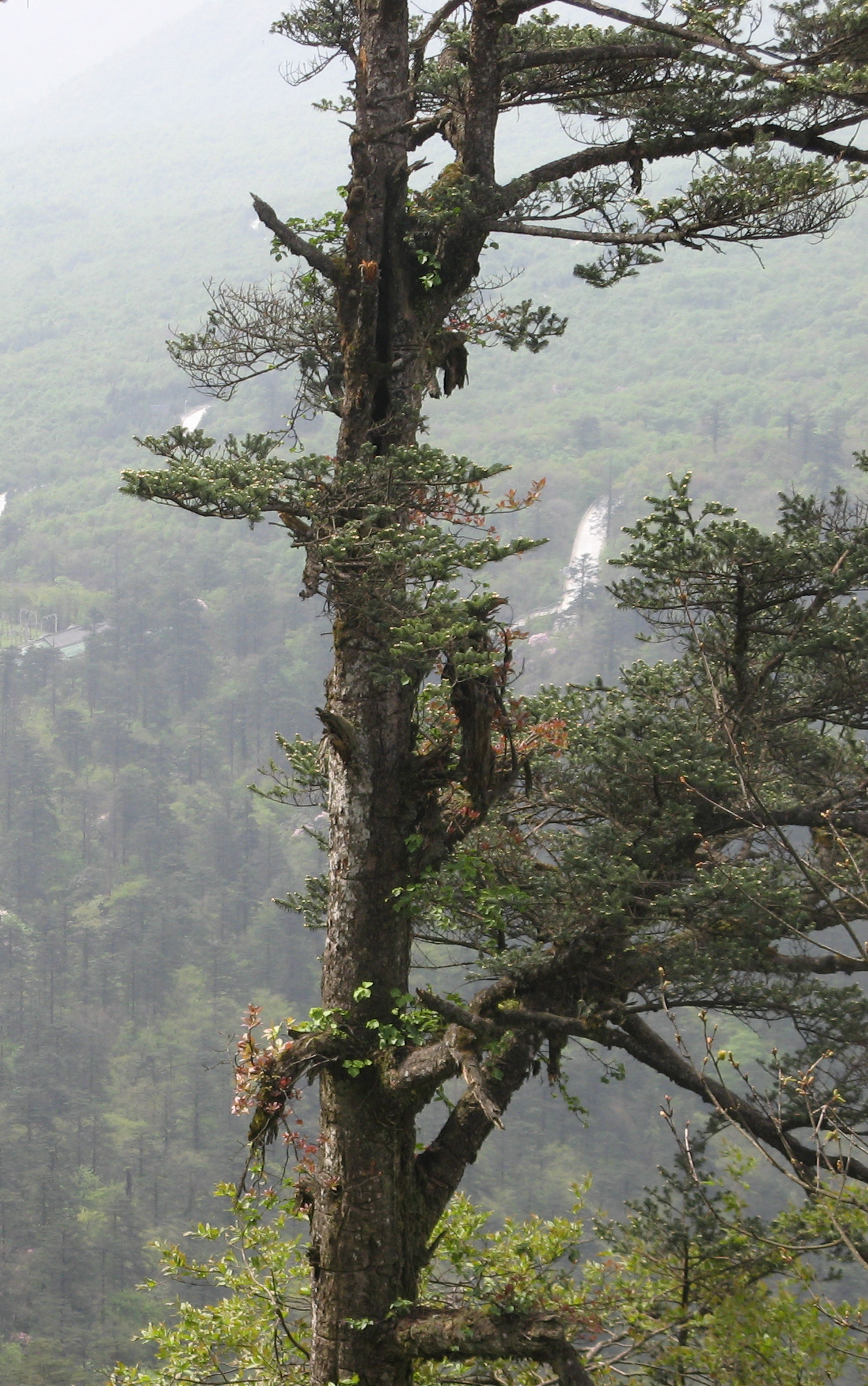

Conservation status
- Vulnerable (IUCN 3.1)

Scientific classification
- Kingdom: Plantae
- Clade: Tracheophytes
- Clade: Gymnospermae
- Division: Pinophyta
- Class: Pinopsida
- Order: Pinales
- Family: Pinaceae
- Genus: Abies
- Species: A. fabri

Binomial name
- Abies fabri (Mast.) Craib

Synonyms
- Keteleeria fabri Mast.; Abies delavayi var. fabri (Mast.) D.R.Hunt

= Abies fabri =

Species of conifer

Abies fabri (Faber's fir) is a conifer species in the family Pinaceae. It is endemic to Sichuan in western China, occurring on the sacred mountain of Emei Shan (from where it was first described) and westward to the Gongga Shan massif, growing at altitudes of 1,500–4,000 metres (4,900–13,100 ft).

It is a tree growing to 40 metres (130 ft) tall, with a trunk up to a metre in diameter, and a conical to broad columnar crown. The shoots are yellowish-brown, hairless or slightly hairy. The leaves are linear, 1.5–3 centimetres (0.59–1.18 in) long and 2–2.5 millimetres (0.079–0.098 in) wide, glossy dark green above, and with two white stomatal bands below; the leaf margins are slightly revolute. The cones are cylindrical, dark purple when immature, ripening purple-blue, 5–11 centimetres (2.0–4.3 in) long and 3–4.5 centimetres (1.2–1.8 in) wide, with slightly exserted bracts.

The most serious threat to Abies fabri seems to be acid rain from nearby industries in Chengdu.

There are two subspecies:

- Abies fabri subsp. fabri. Central and western Sichuan, in areas with heavy summer monsoon rainfall.
- Abies fabri subsp. minensis. Northwestern Sichuan, with a slightly drier climate.

Abies fabri is closely related to Abies delavayi and Abies forrestii, which replace it to the south and southwest respectively in southern Sichuan and Yunnan, and to Abies fargesii, which replaces it further north in Gansu.
