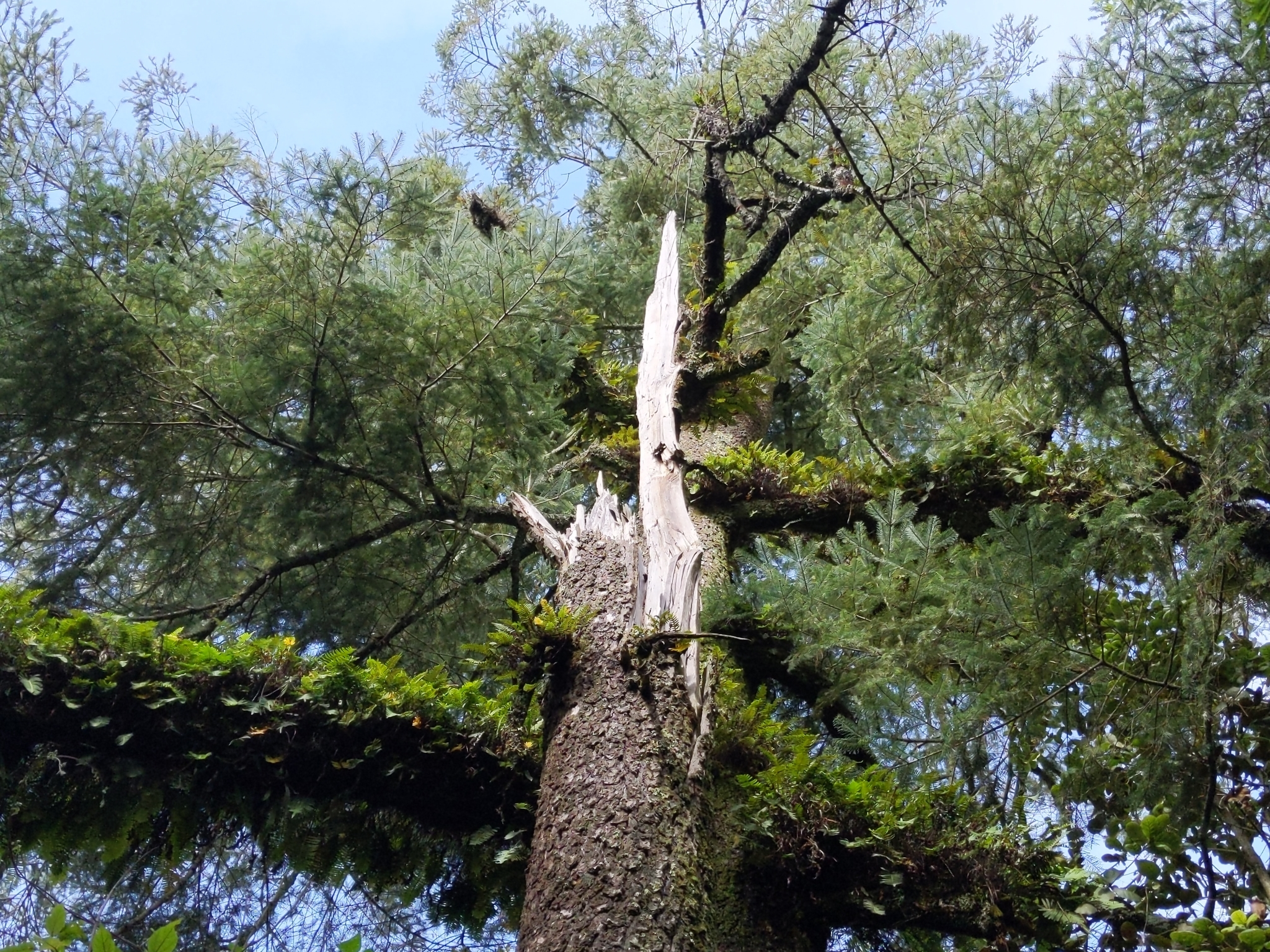
- Abies flinckii in Huitzilac (Morelos, Mexico)

Scientific classification
- Kingdom: Plantae
- Clade: Tracheophytes
- Clade: Gymnospermae
- Division: Pinophyta
- Class: Pinopsida
- Order: Pinales
- Family: Pinaceae
- Genus: Abies
- Species: A. flinckii

Binomial name
- Abies flinckii Rushforth

= Abies flinckii =

Species of conifer

Abies flinckii, commonly known as the Jalisco fir, is a species of conifer in the genus Abies. It is native to central Mexico and found along the Transmexican Volcanic Belt at altitudes between 2 km and 3.5 km above sea level.
