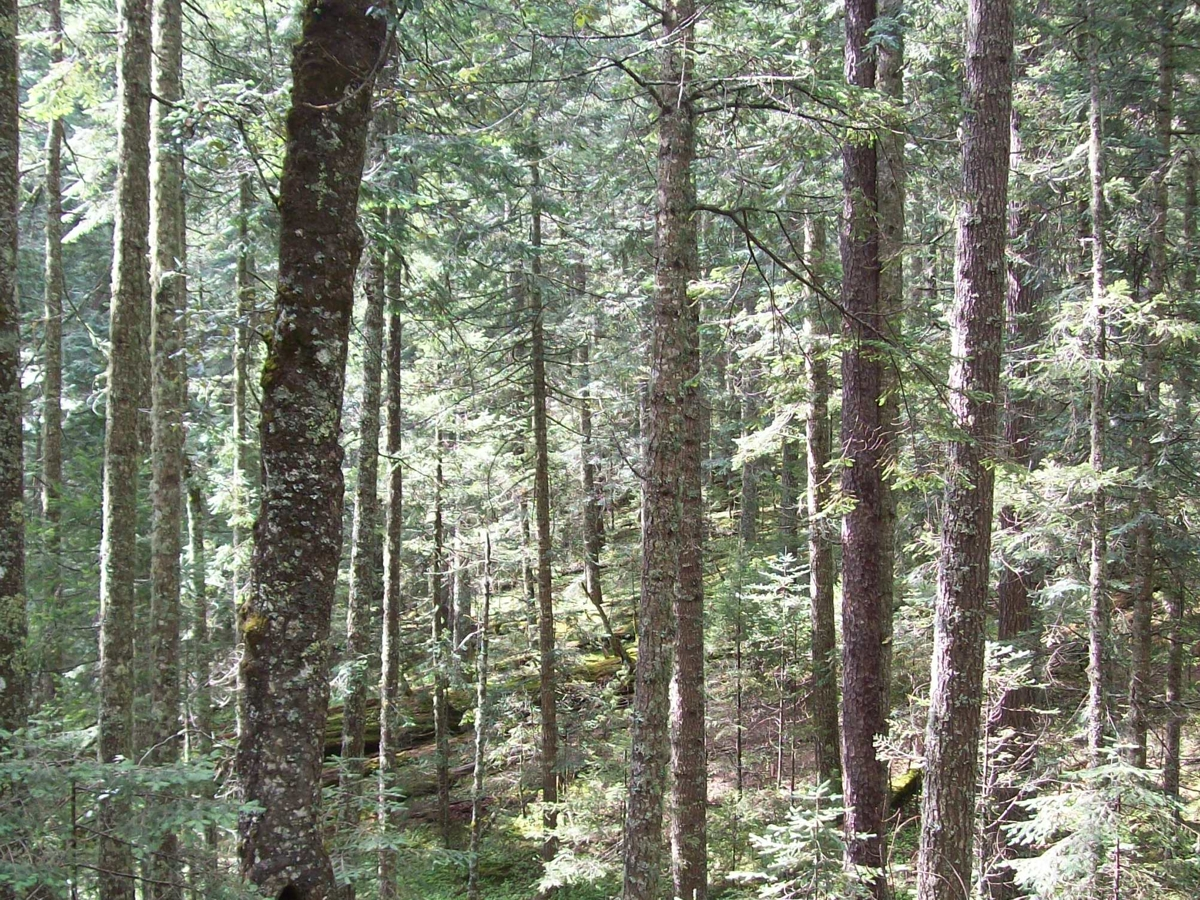
- A stand of Abies durangensis in Tamazula, Durango, Mexico

Conservation status
- Least Concern (IUCN 3.1)

Scientific classification
- Kingdom: Plantae
- Clade: Tracheophytes
- Clade: Gymnospermae
- Division: Pinophyta
- Class: Pinopsida
- Order: Pinales
- Family: Pinaceae
- Genus: Abies
- Species: A. durangensis

Binomial name
- Abies durangensis Martínez

Varieties
- Abies durangensis var. coahuilensis (I.M. Johnst.) Mart.

Synonyms
- Abies neodurangensis Debreczy, Racz et Salazar

= Abies durangensis =

Durango fir

Species of conifer

Abies durangensis is a species of conifer in the family Pinaceae. It was described botanically by Maximino Martínez in 1942 and is found only in Mexico (Durango, Chihuahua, Coahuila, Jalisco and Sinaloa).
