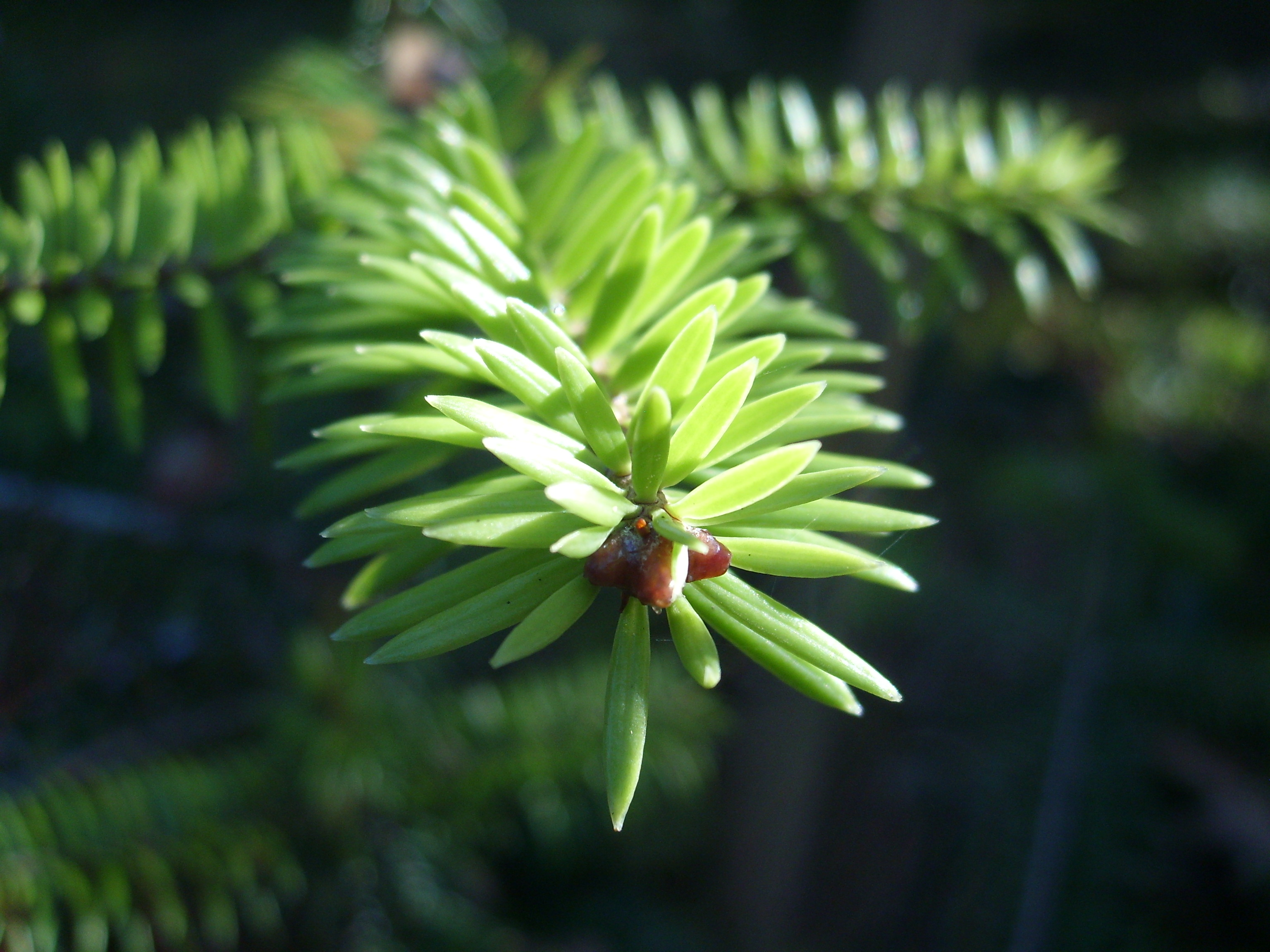

Conservation status
- Vulnerable (IUCN 3.1)

Scientific classification
- Kingdom: Plantae
- Clade: Tracheophytes
- Clade: Gymnospermae
- Division: Pinophyta
- Class: Pinopsida
- Order: Pinales
- Family: Pinaceae
- Genus: Abies
- Species: A. recurvata

Binomial name
- Abies recurvata Mast.

= Abies recurvata =

Species of conifer

Abies recurvata, known as the Min Fir, is a species of conifer in the family Pinaceae. It is found only in China. Abies recurvata is a distinct fir species usually recognized by the needles on its leaders mostly recurved or reflexed. It occurs in the drier, colder northern regions of central China in Sichuan and Gansu provinces at elevations between 2300 and 3600 m, usually on windy cliffs or in deep river valleys. Sometimes, however, also appears in dry low scrub on exposed mountain slopes. The most typical associated conifer species include Juniperus convallium, Juniperus formosana var. mairei, Juniperus squamata var. fargesii, Juniperus tibetica, Picea asperata, and Picea wilsonii. Abies recurvata is a small to large-sized tree mostly with conical crown, occasionally reaching a height of 80 m, and a trunk diameter of 0.8 metres (2 ft 7 in). It has rather smooth gray or rusty brown bark, at first shedding in thin plates, becoming grayish-brown and detaching in thick plates. The branchlets are grayish-white or light yellow with 1.2–2.5 centimetres (0.47–0.98 in) long needles horizontally outspreading on shade branches, radially outspreading on fertile branches; often thick and recurved, green to gray above and densely set with stoma-lines, with 2 light grayish-green stomatal bands below. Abies recurvata has 4–8 centimetres (1.6–3.1 in) long ovoid or cylindrical-ovoid, gray- or purplish blue cones; the bracts are somewhat shorter than the cone-scales, included or with slightly exposed tips.
