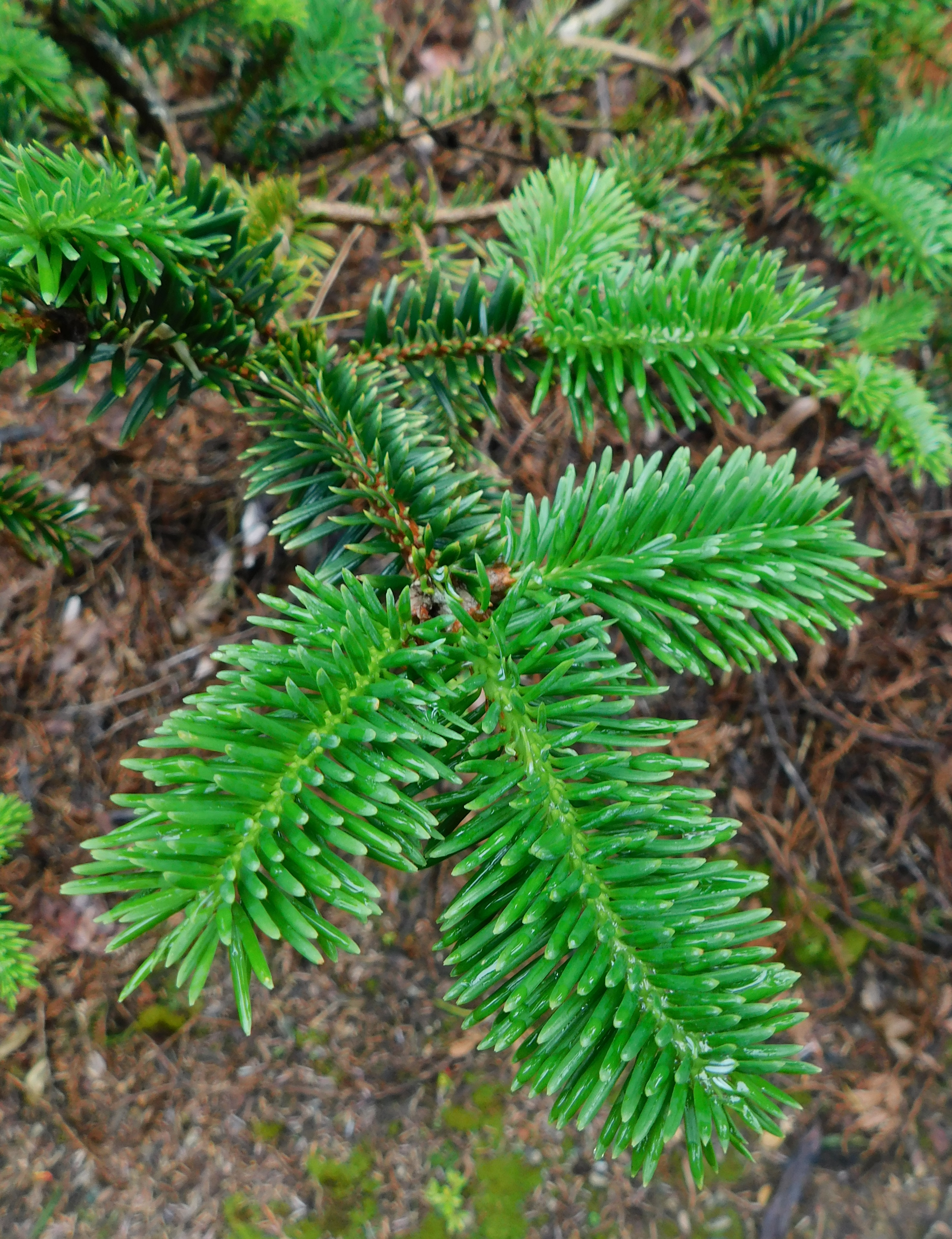
- var. georgei

Conservation status
- Least Concern (IUCN 3.1)

Scientific classification
- Kingdom: Plantae
- Clade: Tracheophytes
- Clade: Gymnospermae
- Division: Pinophyta
- Class: Pinopsida
- Order: Pinales
- Family: Pinaceae
- Genus: Abies
- Species: A. forrestii

Binomial name
- Abies forrestii Coltm.-Rog.

Synonyms
- Abies chengii Rushforth

= Abies forrestii =

Species of conifer

Abies forrestii is a species of conifer in the family Pinaceae, endemic to China. It is named after the Scottish botanist and plant-hunter George Forrest (1873–1932), who discovered it for western science in Yunnan province. Its common names include Forrest's fir.

This species is variable in morphology, and there are several varieties. Some of these are treated as separate species. In general, it grows up to about 20 meters tall. The needles are 1.5 to 4 centimeters long and the purplish, brown, or black cones are 7 to 12 centimeters long.

Varieties include:

- A. forrestii var. ferreana (syn. Abies chayuensis)
- A. forrestii var. forrestii (syn. Abies chengii)
- A. forrestii var. georgei – George's fir
- A. forrestii var. smithii

This species grows in the mountains of southwestern China, sometimes at high altitudes. At lower elevations it grows in mixed forests with species such as Picea likiangensis, Larix potaninii, Tsuga dumosa, and Betula albosinensis. It is sometimes a dominant member of the canopy in rhododendron woodlands.

This tree is used for construction wood and pulp.
