= List of trees and shrubs by taxonomic family =

The following is a list of widely known trees and shrubs. Taxonomic families for the following trees and shrubs are listed in alphabetical order, likewise the genera and closely related species. The list currently includes 1352 species.

Conservation status
Least-concern species
Vulnerable species
Endangered species
Critically endangered

== Gymnosperms ==
- Conifers
  - Araucariaceae: monkey-puzzle family
  - Cupressaceae: cypress family
  - Pinaceae: pine family
  - Podocarpaceae: podocarp family
  - Sciadopityaceae: umbrella pine family
  - Taxaceae: yew family
- Cycads
  - Cycadaceae: cycad family
- Maidenhair trees
  - Ginkgoaceae: maidenhair family

Acrogymnospermae
Scientific name	Common name	Family	Conservation status
Conifers
Araucariaceae: monkey-puzzle family
Agathis: kauri
Agathis australis	kauri; New Zealand kauri	Araucariaceae (monkey-puzzle family)	
Agathis lanceolata	red kauri	Araucariaceae (monkey-puzzle family)	
Agathis robusta	Queensland kauri; smooth bark kauri; Dundathu pine	Araucariaceae (monkey-puzzle family)	
Araucaria: monkey-puzzle trees
Araucaria angustifolia	Paraná pine	Araucariaceae (monkey-puzzle family)	
Araucaria araucana	monkey-puzzle	Araucariaceae (monkey-puzzle family)	
Araucaria bidwillii	bunya-bunya	Araucariaceae (monkey-puzzle family)	
Araucaria columnaris	Cook pine	Araucariaceae (monkey-puzzle family)	
Araucaria cunninghamii	Moreton Bay pine; hoop pine	Araucariaceae (monkey-puzzle family)	
Araucaria heterophylla	Norfolk Island pine	Araucariaceae (monkey-puzzle family)	
Araucaria hunsteinii	klinki	Araucariaceae (monkey-puzzle family)	
Wollemia: wollemia
Wollemia nobilis	wollemia	Araucariaceae (monkey-puzzle family)	
Cupressaceae: cypress family
Athrotaxis: Tasmanian cedars
Athrotaxis cupressoides	pencil pine	Cupressaceae (cypress family)	
Athrotaxis selaginoides	King Billy pine	Cupressaceae (cypress family)	
Callitris: cypress-pines
Callitris columellaris	white cypress-pine; Murray River cypress-pine; northern cypress-pine	Cupressaceae (cypress family)	
Callitris preissii	Rottnest Island cypress-pine	Cupressaceae (cypress family)	
Callitris verrucosa	mallee cypress-pine; sandhill pine; scrub cypress pine	Cupressaceae (cypress family)	
Calocedrus: incense-cedars
Calocedrus decurrens	California incense-cedar	Cupressaceae (cypress family)	
Chamaecyparis: cypresses
Chamaecyparis lawsoniana	Lawson's cypress; Port Orford-cedar	Cupressaceae (cypress family)	
Chamaecyparis nootkatensis	Nootka cypress; Alaska-cedar; yellow-cedar	Cupressaceae (cypress family)	
Chamaecyparis obtusa	hinoki cypress	Cupressaceae (cypress family)	
Chamaecyparis pisifera	sawara cypress	Cupressaceae (cypress family)	
Chamaecyparis thyoides	white cypress; Atlantic white cypress	Cupressaceae (cypress family)	
Cryptomeria: sugis
Cryptomeria japonica	Sugi; Japanese cedar	Cupressaceae (cypress family)	
Cunninghamia: cunninghamia
Cunninghamia lanceolata	Cunninghamia; China-fir	Cupressaceae (cypress family)	
Cupressus: true cypresses
Cupressus arizonica stephensonii	Cuyamaca cypress	Cupressaceae (cypress family)	
Cupressus forbesii	Tecate cypress	Cupressaceae (cypress family)	
Cupressus × leylandii	Leyland cypress	Cupressaceae (cypress family)	
Cupressus macrocarpa	Monterey cypress	Cupressaceae (cypress family)	
Cupressus sempervirens	Mediterranean cypress; Italian cypress	Cupressaceae (cypress family)	
Glyptostrobus: Oriental swamp cypresses
Glyptostrobus pensilis	Chinese swamp cypress	Cupressaceae (cypress family)	
Juniperus: junipers
Juniperus ashei	Ashe's juniper	Cupressaceae (cypress family)	
Juniperus chinensis	Chinese juniper	Cupressaceae (cypress family)	
Juniperus communis	common juniper	Cupressaceae (cypress family)	
Juniperus drupacea	Syrian juniper	Cupressaceae (cypress family)	
Juniperus excelsa	Greek juniper	Cupressaceae (cypress family)	
Juniperus foetidissima	foetid juniper; stinking juniper	Cupressaceae (cypress family)	
Juniperus occidentalis	western juniper	Cupressaceae (cypress family)	
Juniperus oxycedrus	prickly juniper; cade juniper	Cupressaceae (cypress family)	
Juniperus sabina	savin juniper	Cupressaceae (cypress family)	
Juniperus scopulorum	Rocky Mountain juniper	Cupressaceae (cypress family)	
Juniperus silicicola	southern redcedar	Cupressaceae (cypress family)	
Juniperus virginiana	eastern redcedar	Cupressaceae (cypress family)	
Metasequoia: dwarf redwoods
Metasequoia glyptostroboides	dawn redwood	Cupressaceae (cypress family)	
Platycladus: arborvitae
Platycladus orientalis	Oriental arborvitae	Cupressaceae (cypress family)	
Sequoia: true redwoods
Sequoia sempervirens	coast redwood; California redwood; giant redwood	Cupressaceae (cypress family)	
Sequoiadendron: giant sequoias
Sequoiadendron giganteum	giant sequoia; big tree	Cupressaceae (cypress family)	
Taiwania: Taiwania trees
Taiwania cryptomerioides	Taiwania	Cupressaceae (cypress family)	
Taxodium: bald or swamp cypresses
(Taxodium distichum var. nutans)	pond cypress	Cupressaceae (cypress family)	
Taxodium distichum	bald cypress	Cupressaceae (cypress family)	
Taxodium mucronatum	Montezuma cypress	Cupressaceae (cypress family)	
Thuja: arborvitae
Thuja occidentalis	eastern arborvitae	Cupressaceae (cypress family)	
Thuja plicata	giant arborvitae	Cupressaceae (cypress family)	
Pinaceae: pine family
Abies: fir trees
Abies alba	European silver fir	Pinaceae (pine family)	
Abies amabilis	Pacific silver fir	Pinaceae (pine family)	
Abies balsamea	balsam fir	Pinaceae (pine family)	
Abies beshanzuensis	Baishanzu fir	Pinaceae (pine family)	
Abies borisii-regis	Bulgarian fir	Pinaceae (pine family)	
Abies bracteata	Santa Lucia fir	Pinaceae (pine family)	
Abies cephalonica	Greek fir	Pinaceae (pine family)	
Abies chensiensis	Shensi fir	Pinaceae (pine family)	
Abies cilicica	Cilician fir	Pinaceae (pine family)	
Abies concolor	white fir	Pinaceae (pine family)	
Abies delavayi	Delavay's fir	Pinaceae (pine family)	
Abies delavayi subsp. fansipanensis	Fansipan fir	Pinaceae (pine family)	
Abies densa	Bhutan fir	Pinaceae (pine family)	
Abies durangensis	Durango fir	Pinaceae (pine family)	
Abies fabri	Faber's fir	Pinaceae (pine family)	
Abies fanjingshanensis	Fanjingshan fir	Pinaceae (pine family)	
Abies fargesii	Farges' fir	Pinaceae (pine family)	
Abies firma	momi fir	Pinaceae (pine family)	
Abies flinckii	Jalisco fir	Pinaceae (pine family)	
Abies forrestii	Forrest's fir	Pinaceae (pine family)	
Abies fraseri	Fraser fir	Pinaceae (pine family)	
Abies grandis	grand fir	Pinaceae (pine family)	
Abies guatemalensis	Guatemalan fir	Pinaceae (pine family)	
Abies hickelii	Hickel's fir	Pinaceae (pine family)	
Abies hidalgensis	Hidalgo fir	Pinaceae (pine family)	
Abies holophylla	Manchurian fir	Pinaceae (pine family)	
Abies homolepis	Nikko fir	Pinaceae (pine family)	
Abies jaliscana	Jalisco fir	Pinaceae (pine family)	
Abies kawakamii	Taiwan fir	Pinaceae (pine family)	
Abies koreana	Korean fir	Pinaceae (pine family)	
Abies lasiocarpa	alpine fir; subalpine fir	Pinaceae (pine family)	
Abies magnifica	red fir; California mountain fir	Pinaceae (pine family)	
Abies mariesii	Maries' fir	Pinaceae (pine family)	
Abies milleri	Miller's fir (fossil)	Pinaceae (pine family)	
Abies nebrodensis	Sicilian fir	Pinaceae (pine family)	
Abies nephrolepis	Khingan fir	Pinaceae (pine family)	
Abies nordmanniana	Caucasian fir; Nordmann fir	Pinaceae (pine family)	
Abies nordmanniana subsp. equi-trojani	Turkish fir	Pinaceae (pine family)	
Abies numidica	Algerian fir	Pinaceae (pine family)	
Abies pindrow	pindrow fir	Pinaceae (pine family)	
Abies pinsapo	Spanish fir	Pinaceae (pine family)	
Abies recurvata	Min Fir	Pinaceae (pine family)	
Abies religiosa	oyamel fir	Pinaceae (pine family)	
Abies procera	noble fir	Pinaceae (pine family)	
Abies sachalinensis	Sakhalin fir	Pinaceae (pine family)	
Abies sibirica	Siberian fir	Pinaceae (pine family)	
Abies spectabilis	East Himalayan fir	Pinaceae (pine family)	
Abies squamata	Flaky Fir	Pinaceae (pine family)	
Abies veitchii	Veitch's fir	Pinaceae (pine family)	
Abies vejarii	Vejar's fir	Pinaceae (pine family)	
Abies yuanbaoshanensis	Yuanbaoshan fir	Pinaceae (pine family)	
Abies ziyuanensis	Zhiyuan fir	Pinaceae (pine family)	
Cathaya: Cathay firs
Cathaya argyrophylla	Cathaya	Pinaceae (pine family)	
Cedrus: true cedars
Cedrus atlantica	Atlas cedar	Pinaceae (pine family)	
Cedrus brevifolia	Cyprus cedar	Pinaceae (pine family)	
Cedrus deodara	deodar cedar	Pinaceae (pine family)	
Cedrus libani	cedar of Lebanon; Lebanon cedar	Pinaceae (pine family)	
Keteleeria: keteleerias
Keteleeria davidiana	David's keteleeria	Pinaceae (pine family)	
Keteleeria evelyniana	Evelyn's keteleeria	Pinaceae (pine family)	
Keteleeria fortunei	Fortune's keteleeria	Pinaceae (pine family)	
Larix: larches
Larix decidua	European larch	Pinaceae (pine family)	
Larix gmelinii	Dahurian larch	Pinaceae (pine family)	
Larix griffithii	Sikkim larch	Pinaceae (pine family)	
Larix kaempferi	Japanese larch	Pinaceae (pine family)	
Larix laricina	tamarack; eastern larch	Pinaceae (pine family)	
Larix lyallii	alpine larch	Pinaceae (pine family)	
Larix mastersiana	masters larch	Pinaceae (pine family)	
Larix occidentalis	western larch	Pinaceae (pine family)	
Larix potaninii	Chinese larch	Pinaceae (pine family)	
Larix sibirica	Siberian larch	Pinaceae (pine family)	
Nothotsuga: bristlecone hemlocks
Nothotsuga longibracteata	bristlecone hemlock	Pinaceae (pine family)	
Picea: spruces
Picea abies	Norway spruce	Pinaceae (pine family)	
Picea alcoquiana	Alcock's spruce	Pinaceae (pine family)	
Picea asperata	dragon spruce	Pinaceae (pine family)	
Picea aurantiaca	orange spruce	Pinaceae (pine family)	
Picea brachytyla	Sargent's spruce	Pinaceae (pine family)	
Picea breweriana	Brewer's spruce	Pinaceae (pine family)	
Picea chihuahuana	Chihuahua spruce	Pinaceae (pine family)	
Picea crassifolia	Qinghai spruce	Pinaceae (pine family)	
Picea engelmannii	Engelmann spruce	Pinaceae (pine family)	
Picea farreri	Burmese spruce	Pinaceae (pine family)	
Picea glauca	white spruce	Pinaceae (pine family)	
Picea glehnii	Glehn's spruce	Pinaceae (pine family)	
Picea jezoensis	Jezo spruce	Pinaceae (pine family)	
Picea koraiensis	Korean spruce	Pinaceae (pine family)	
Picea koyamae	Koyama's spruce	Pinaceae (pine family)	
Picea likiangensis	Likiang spruce	Pinaceae (pine family)	
Picea mariana	black spruce	Pinaceae (pine family)	
Picea martinezii	Martinez spruce	Pinaceae (pine family)	
Picea maximowiczii	Maximowicz's spruce	Pinaceae (pine family)	
Picea meyeri	Meyer's spruce	Pinaceae (pine family)	
Picea morrisonicola	Taiwan spruce	Pinaceae (pine family)	
Picea neoveitchii	Veitch's spruce	Pinaceae (pine family)	
Picea obovata	Siberian spruce	Pinaceae (pine family)	
Picea omorika	Serbian spruce	Pinaceae (pine family)	
Picea orientalis	Caucasian spruce	Pinaceae (pine family)	
Picea polita	tiger-tail spruce	Pinaceae (pine family)	
Picea pungens	blue spruce	Pinaceae (pine family)	
Picea purpurea	purple-cone spruce	Pinaceae (pine family)	
Picea retroflexa	green dragon spruce	Pinaceae (pine family)	
Picea rubens	red spruce	Pinaceae (pine family)	
Picea schrenkiana	Schrenk's spruce	Pinaceae (pine family)	
Picea sitchensis	Sitka spruce	Pinaceae (pine family)	
Picea smithiana	Morinda spruce; West Himalayan spruce	Pinaceae (pine family)	
Picea spinulosa	Sikkim spruce	Pinaceae (pine family)	
Picea wilsonii	Wilson's spruce	Pinaceae (pine family)	
Pinus: pines
Pinus albicaulis	whitebark pine	Pinaceae (pine family)	
Pinus amamiana	Yakushima white pine	Pinaceae (pine family)	
Pinus aristata	Rocky Mountains bristlecone pine	Pinaceae (pine family)	
Pinus arizonica	Arizona pine	Pinaceae (pine family)	
Pinus armandii	Chinese white pine	Pinaceae (pine family)	
Pinus attenuata	knobcone pine	Pinaceae (pine family)	
Pinus ayacahuite	Mexican white pine	Pinaceae (pine family)	
Pinus balfouriana	foxtail pine	Pinaceae (pine family)	
Pinus banksiana	jack pine	Pinaceae (pine family)	
Pinus bhutanica	Bhutan white pine	Pinaceae (pine family)	
Pinus brutia	Calabrian pine; Turkish pine	Pinaceae (pine family)	
Pinus bungeana	Lacebark pine	Pinaceae (pine family)	
Pinus canariensis	Canary Island pine	Pinaceae (pine family)	
Pinus caribaea	Caribbean pine	Pinaceae (pine family)	
Pinus cembra	Swiss pine	Pinaceae (pine family)	
Pinus cembroides	Mexican pinyon	Pinaceae (pine family)	
Pinus cernua	NA	Pinaceae (pine family)	
Pinus chiapensis	Chiapas pine	Pinaceae (pine family)	
Pinus clausa	sand pine	Pinaceae (pine family)	
Pinus contorta subsp. contorta	shore pine	Pinaceae (pine family)	
Pinus contorta subsp. latifolia	lodgepole pine	Pinaceae (pine family)	
Pinus cooperi	Cooper's pine	Pinaceae (pine family)	
Pinus coulteri	Coulter pine; bigcone pine	Pinaceae (pine family)	
Pinus cubensis	Cuban pine	Pinaceae (pine family)	
Pinus culminicola	Potosí piñón	Pinaceae (pine family)	
Pinus dabeshanensis	Dabieshan white pine	Pinaceae (pine family)	
Pinus dalatensis	Vietnamese white pine	Pinaceae (pine family)	
Pinus densata	Sikang pine	Pinaceae (pine family)	
Pinus densiflora	Japanese red pine	Pinaceae (pine family)	
Pinus devoniana	Michoacán pine	Pinaceae (pine family)	
Pinus gordoniana	Douglas pine	Pinaceae (pine family)	
Pinus durangensis	Durango pine	Pinaceae (pine family)	
Pinus echinata	shortleaf pine	Pinaceae (pine family)	
Pinus edulis	pinyon; Colorado pinyon	Pinaceae (pine family)	
Pinus elliottii	slash pine	Pinaceae (pine family)	
Pinus engelmannii	Apache pine	Pinaceae (pine family)	
Pinus fenzeliana	Hainan white pine	Pinaceae (pine family)	
Pinus flexilis	limber pine	Pinaceae (pine family)	
Pinus gerardiana	Chilghoza pine	Pinaceae (pine family)	
Pinus glabra	spruce pine	Pinaceae (pine family)	
Pinus greggii	Gregg's pine	Pinaceae (pine family)	
Pinus × hakkodensis	Hakkōda pine	Pinaceae (pine family)	
Pinus halepensis	Aleppo pine	Pinaceae (pine family)	
Pinus hartwegii	Hartweg's pine	Pinaceae (pine family)	
Pinus heldreichii	Bosnian pine	Pinaceae (pine family)	
Pinus henryi	Henry's pine	Pinaceae (pine family)	
Pinus herrerae	Herrera's pine	Pinaceae (pine family)	
Pinus hwangshanensis	Huangshan pine	Pinaceae (pine family)	
Pinus jaliscana	Jalisco pine	Pinaceae (pine family)	
Pinus jeffreyi	Jeffrey pine	Pinaceae (pine family)	
Pinus johannis	Johann's pine	Pinaceae (pine family)	
Pinus kesiya	Khasi pine	Pinaceae (pine family)	
Pinus koraiensis	Korean pine	Pinaceae (pine family)	
Pinus krempfii	Krempf's pine	Pinaceae (pine family)	
Pinus lambertiana	sugar pine	Pinaceae (pine family)	
Pinus latteri	Tenasserim pine	Pinaceae (pine family)	
Pinus lawsonii	Lawson's pine	Pinaceae (pine family)	
Pinus leiophylla	Chihuahua pine	Pinaceae (pine family)	
Pinus longaeva	ancient bristlecone pine; Great Basin bristlecone pine	Pinaceae (pine family)	
Pinus luchuensis	Luchu pine	Pinaceae (pine family)	
Pinus lumholtzii	Lumholtz's weeping pine	Pinaceae (pine family)	
Pinus luzmariae	three-needled egg-cone pine	Pinaceae (pine family)	
Pinus maestrensis	Sierra Maestra pine	Pinaceae (pine family)	
Pinus massoniana	Chinese red pine	Pinaceae (pine family)	
Pinus maximartinezii	big-cone pinyon	Pinaceae (pine family)	
Pinus maximinoi	thinleaf pine	Pinaceae (pine family)	
Pinus merkusii	Sumatran pine	Pinaceae (pine family)	
Pinus monophylla	single-leaf pine	Pinaceae (pine family)	
Pinus montezumae	Montezuma pine	Pinaceae (pine family)	
Pinus monticola	western white pine	Pinaceae (pine family)	
Pinus morrisonicola	Taiwan white pine	Pinaceae (pine family)	
Pinus mugo	mugo pine; Swiss mountain pine	Pinaceae (pine family)	
Pinus muricata	Bishop pine	Pinaceae (pine family)	
Pinus nelsonii	Nelson's pinyon	Pinaceae (pine family)	
Pinus nigra subsp. nigra	European black pine; Austrian pine	Pinaceae (pine family)	
Pinus nigra subsp. salzmannii	Cevennes black pine	Pinaceae (pine family)	
Pinus nigra subsp. salzmannii var. corsicana	Corsican pine	Pinaceae (pine family)	
Pinus occidentalis	Hispaniolan pine	Pinaceae (pine family)	
Pinus oocarpa	egg-cone pine	Pinaceae (pine family)	
Pinus orizabensis	Orizaba pinyon	Pinaceae (pine family)	
Pinus palustris	longleaf pine	Pinaceae (pine family)	
Pinus parviflora	Japanese white pine	Pinaceae (pine family)	
Pinus patula	jelecote pine	Pinaceae (pine family)	
Pinus peuce	Macedonian pine	Pinaceae (pine family)	
Pinus pinaster	maritime pine	Pinaceae (pine family)	
Pinus pinea	European stone pine	Pinaceae (pine family)	
Pinus ponderosa	ponderosa pine	Pinaceae (pine family)	
Pinus praetermissa	Mexican scrub pine	Pinaceae (pine family)	
Pinus pringlei	Pringle's pine	Pinaceae (pine family)	
Pinus pseudostrobus	smooth-bark Mexican pine	Pinaceae (pine family)	
Pinus pumila	dwarf Siberian pine	Pinaceae (pine family)	
Pinus pungens	table mountain pine	Pinaceae (pine family)	
Pinus quadrifolia	Parry pinyon	Pinaceae (pine family)	
Pinus radiata	Monterey pine	Pinaceae (pine family)	
Pinus remota	Texas pinyon	Pinaceae (pine family)	
Pinus resinosa	red pine	Pinaceae (pine family)	
Pinus rigida	pitch pine	Pinaceae (pine family)	
Pinus roxburghii	Chir pine	Pinaceae (pine family)	
Pinus rzedowskii	Rzedowski's pine	Pinaceae (pine family)	
Pinus sabiniana	gray pine	Pinaceae (pine family)	
Pinus serotina	pond pine; swamp pine	Pinaceae (pine family)	
Pinus sibirica	Siberian pine	Pinaceae (pine family)	
Pinus squamata	Qiaojia pine	Pinaceae (pine family)	
Pinus strobiformis	southwestern white pine	Pinaceae (pine family)	
Pinus strobus	eastern white pine	Pinaceae (pine family)	
Pinus stylesii	Styles's white pine	Pinaceae (pine family)	
Pinus sylvestris	Scots pine	Pinaceae (pine family)	
Pinus tabuliformis	Chinese pine; Chinese red pine	Pinaceae (pine family)	
Pinus taeda	loblolly pine	Pinaceae (pine family)	
Pinus taiwanensis	Taiwan red pine	Pinaceae (pine family)	
Pinus tecunumanii	Tecun Uman's pine	Pinaceae (pine family)	
Pinus teocote	Aztec pine	Pinaceae (pine family)	
Pinus thunbergii	Japanese black pine	Pinaceae (pine family)	
Pinus torreyana	Torrey pine	Pinaceae (pine family)	
Pinus tropicalis	tropical pine	Pinaceae (pine family)	
Pinus vallartensis	Puerto Vallarta pine	Pinaceae (pine family)	
Pinus virginiana	Virginia pine	Pinaceae (pine family)	
Pinus wallichiana	blue pine; Bhutan pine; Himalayan pine	Pinaceae (pine family)	
Pinus wangii	Guangdong white pine	Pinaceae (pine family)	
Pinus yunnanensis	Yunnan pine	Pinaceae (pine family)	
Pseudolarix: golden-larches
Pseudolarix amabilis	golden-larch	Pinaceae (pine family)	
Pseudotsuga: Douglas-firs
Pseudotsuga japonica	Japanese Douglas-fir	Pinaceae (pine family)	
Pseudotsuga macrocarpa	bigcone Douglas-fir	Pinaceae (pine family)	
Pseudotsuga menziesii	Douglas-fir; common douglas-fir	Pinaceae (pine family)	
Pseudotsuga menziesii subsp. glauca	blue Douglas-fir	Pinaceae (pine family)	
Pseudotsuga sinensis	Chinese Douglas-fir	Pinaceae (pine family)	
Tsuga: hemlocks
Tsuga canadensis	eastern hemlock; Canadian hemlock	Pinaceae (pine family)	
Tsuga caroliniana	Carolina hemlock	Pinaceae (pine family)	
Tsuga chinensis	Chinese hemlock	Pinaceae (pine family)	
Tsuga diversifolia	Northern Japanese hemlock	Pinaceae (pine family)	
Tsuga dumosa	Himalayan hemlock	Pinaceae (pine family)	
Tsuga forrestii	Forest Hemlock	Pinaceae (pine family)	
Tsuga heterophylla	western hemlock	Pinaceae (pine family)	
Tsuga mertensiana	mountain hemlock	Pinaceae (pine family)	
Tsuga sieboldii	southern Japanese hemlock	Pinaceae (pine family)	
Tsuga ulleungensis	Ulleungdo hemlock	Pinaceae (pine family)	
Podocarpaceae: podocarp family
Afrocarpus: African podocarps
Afrocarpus gracilior	musengera; zigba	Podocarpaceae (podocarp family)	
Dacrycarpus:
Dacrycarpus dacrydioides	kahikatea	Podocarpaceae (podocarp family)	
Dacrydium:
Dacrydium cupressinum	rimu	Podocarpaceae (podocarp family)	
Podocarpus: Australasian podocarps
Podocarpus gracilior	East African yellowwood	Podocarpaceae (podocarp family)	
Podocarpus henkelii	long-leafed yellowwood	Podocarpaceae (podocarp family)	
Podocarpus macrophyllus	kusamaki; inumaki	Podocarpaceae (podocarp family)	
Podocarpus neriifolius	oleander-leaf podocarp	Podocarpaceae (podocarp family)	
Sciadopityaceae: koyamaki family
Sciadopitys: sciadopitys trees
Sciadopitys verticillata	koyamaki; umbrella-pine	Sciadopityaceae (umbrella pine family)	
Taxaceae: yew family
Taxus: yew trees
Taxus baccata	European yew	Taxaceae (yew family)	
Taxus brevifolia	Pacific yew	Taxaceae (yew family)	
Taxus canadensis	Canada yew; American yew	Taxaceae (yew family)	
Taxus chinensis	Chinese yew	Taxaceae (yew family)	
Taxus cuspidata	Japanese yew	Taxaceae (yew family)	
Taxus floridana	Florida yew	Taxaceae (yew family)	
Taxus globosa	Mexican yew	Taxaceae (yew family)	
Taxus × media	hybrid yew	Taxaceae (yew family)	
Taxus sumatrana	Sumatran yew	Taxaceae (yew family)	
Taxus wallichiana	Himalayan yew	Taxaceae (yew family)	
Torreya: torreyas
Torreya californica	California Torreya	Taxaceae (yew family)	
Torreya taxifolia	Florida torreya	Taxaceae (yew family)	
Cycads
Cycadaceae: cycad family
Cycas: cycads
Cycas circinalis	Guamanian cycad	Cycadaceae (cycad family)	
Cycas micronesica	Micronesian cycad	Cycadaceae (cycad family)	
Cycas pruinosa	powdery cycad	Cycadaceae (cycad family)	
Cycas revoluta	sago cycad	Cycadaceae (cycad family)	
Cycas thouarsii	Malagasy sago palm	Cycadaceae (cycad family)	
Encephalartos: bread trees
Encephalartos natalensis	Natal cycad	Cycadaceae (cycad family)	
Maidenhair trees
Ginkgoaceae: maidenhair family
Ginkgo: ginkgos or maidenhair trees
Ginkgo biloba	ginkgo; Japanese maidenhair	Ginkgoaceae (maidenhair family)	

== Angiosperms ==
Hardwoods; Aceraceae: maple family; Agavaceae: agave family; Anacardiaceae: cashew family; Annonaceae: custard apple family; Apocynaceae: dogbane family; Aquifoliaceae: holly family; Araliaceae: ginseng family; Arecaceae: palm family; Asphodelaceae: asphodel family; Asteraceae: sunflower family; Berberidaceae: barberry family; Betulaceae: birch family; Bignoniaceae: trumpet creeper family; Bombacaceae: bombax family; Boraginaceae: borage family; Burseraceae: bursera family; Buxaceae: box family; Canellaceae: wild cinnamon family; Cannabaceae: hemp family	Capparidaceae: caper family; Caprifoliaceae: honeysuckle family; Caricaceae: papaya family; Casuarinaceae: casuarina family; Celastraceae: bittersweet family; Cercidiphyllaceae: katsura family; Chrysobalanaceae: coco plum family; Clusiaceae: St. John's wort family; Combretaceae: combretum family; Cornaceae: dogwood family; Cyrillaceae: titi family; Davidsoniaceae: Davidson's plum family; Ebenaceae: ebony family; Elaeagnaceae: oleaster family; Ericaceae: heath family; Euphorbiaceae: spurge family; Fabaceae: legume family (peas); Fagaceae: beech family; Grossulariaceae: gooseberry family	Hamamelidaceae: witch hazel family; Hippocastanaceae: buckeye family; Illiciaceae: anise-tree family; Juglandaceae: walnut family; Lauraceae: laurel family; Lecythidaceae: lecythis family; Lythraceae: loosestrife family; Magnoliaceae: magnolia family; Malpighiaceae: malpighia family; Malvaceae: mallow family; Melastomataceae: melastome family; Meliaceae: mahogany family; Moraceae: mulberry family; Moringaceae: moringa family; Muntingiaceae: strawberry-tree family; Myoporaceae: myoporum family; Myricaceae: bayberry family; Myrsinaceae: myrsine family; Myrtaceae: myrtle family	Nothofagaceae: southern beech family; Nyctaginaceae: four o'clock family; Nyssaceae: sourgum family; Olacaceae: olax family; Oleaceae: olive family; Oxalidaceae: wood sorrel family; Pandanaceae: screwpine family; Papaveraceae: poppy family; Phyllanthaceae: gooseberry tree family; Pittosporaceae: pittosporum family; Platanaceae: sycamore family; Poaceae: grass family; Polygonaceae: knotweed family; Proteaceae: protea family; Punicaceae: pomegranate family; Rhamnaceae: buckthorn family; Rhizophoraceae: mangrove family; Rosaceae: rose family; Rubiaceae: madder family	Rutaceae: citrus family; Salicaceae: willow family; Sapindaceae: soapberry family; Sapotaceae: sapodilla family; Simaroubaceae: quassia family; Solanaceae: nightshade family; Staphyleaceae: bladdernut family; Sterculiaceae: sterculia family; Strelitziaceae: bird-of-paradise family; Styracaceae: storax family; Surianaceae: bay cedar family; Symplocaceae: sweetleaf family; Tamaricaceae: tamarisk family; Theaceae: tea family; Theophrastaceae: theophrasta family; Thymelaeaceae: mezereum family; Tiliaceae: basswood family; Ulmaceae: elm family; Verbenaceae: verbena family

Angiospermae
Scientific name	Common name	Family	Conservation status
Hardwoods
Aceraceae: maple family
Acer: maples
Acer amplum	broad maple	Aceraceae (maple family)	
Acer argutum	deep-veined maple	Aceraceae (maple family)	
Acer floridanum	Florida maple; southern sugar maple	Aceraceae (maple family)	
Acer barbinerve	bearded maple	Aceraceae (maple family)	
Acer buergerianum	trident maple	Aceraceae (maple family)	
Acer caesium	Himalayan maple	Aceraceae (maple family)	
Acer campbellii	Campbell's maple	Aceraceae (maple family)	
Acer campestre	field maple	Aceraceae (maple family)	
Acer capillipes	Kyushu maple; red snakebark maple	Aceraceae (maple family)	
Acer cappadocicum	Cappadocian maple; Caucasian maple	Aceraceae (maple family)	
Acer carpinifolium	hornbeam-leaved maple	Aceraceae (maple family)	
Acer caudatifolium	Kawakami maple	Aceraceae (maple family)	
Acer caudatum	tail-leaf maple	Aceraceae (maple family)	
Acer cinnamomifolium	leatherleaf maple; Yunnan maple	Aceraceae (maple family)	
Acer circinatum	vine maple	Aceraceae (maple family)	
Acer cissifolium	vine-leaved maple	Aceraceae (maple family)	
Acer crataegifolium	hawthorn-leaved maple; hawthorn maple	Aceraceae (maple family)	
Acer creticum	Cretan maple	Aceraceae (maple family)	
Acer davidii	David's maple	Aceraceae (maple family)	
Acer diabolicum	horned maple	Aceraceae (maple family)	
Acer discolor	Chinese maple; Hunan maple	Aceraceae (maple family)	
Acer distylum	lime-leaved maple	Aceraceae (maple family)	
Acer elegantulum	elegant maple	Aceraceae (maple family)	
Acer eucalyptoides	eucalyptus maple; gum maple	Aceraceae (maple family)	
Acer fabri	Faber's maple	Aceraceae (maple family)	
Acer fenzelianum	Fenzl's maple	Aceraceae (maple family)	
Acer forrestii	Forrest's maple	Aceraceae (maple family)	
Acer ginnala	Amur maple	Aceraceae (maple family)	
Acer giraldii	Girald's maple	Aceraceae (maple family)	
Acer glabrum	Rocky Mountain maple; Douglas maple	Aceraceae (maple family)	
Acer granatense	Spanish maple	Aceraceae (maple family)	
Acer grandidentatum	bigtooth maple; canyon maple	Aceraceae (maple family)	
Acer griseum	paperbark maple	Aceraceae (maple family)	
Acer grosseri	Grosser's maple	Aceraceae (maple family)	
Acer heldreichii	Heldreich's maple; Greek maple	Aceraceae (maple family)	
Acer henryi	Henry's maple	Aceraceae (maple family)	
Acer hyrcanum	Balkan maple	Aceraceae (maple family)	
Acer japonicum	downy Japanese maple; fullmoon maple	Aceraceae (maple family)	
Acer laevigatum	smoothbark maple	Aceraceae (maple family)	
Acer leucoderme	chalk maple	Aceraceae (maple family)	
Acer lobelii	Lobel's maple	Aceraceae (maple family)	
Acer macrophyllum	Oregon maple; bigleaf maple	Aceraceae (maple family)	
Acer mandshuricum	Manchurian maple	Aceraceae (maple family)	
Acer maximowiczianum	Nikko maple	Aceraceae (maple family)	
Acer maximowiczii	Maximowicz's maple	Aceraceae (maple family)	
Acer miyabei	Miyabe's maple	Aceraceae (maple family)	
Acer monspessulanum	Montpelier maple	Aceraceae (maple family)	
Acer negundo	ash-leaf maple; boxelder maple; Manitoba maple	Aceraceae (maple family)	
Acer nigrum	black maple	Aceraceae (maple family)	
Acer nipponicum	Nippon maple	Aceraceae (maple family)	
Acer obtusifolium	Syrian maple	Aceraceae (maple family)	
Acer oliverianum	Oliver's maple	Aceraceae (maple family)	
Acer opalus	Italian maple	Aceraceae (maple family)	
Acer palmatum	Japanese maple	Aceraceae (maple family)	
Acer pensylvanicum	striped maple; moosewood	Aceraceae (maple family)	
Acer pictum subsp. mono	painted maple	Aceraceae (maple family)	
Acer platanoides	Norway maple	Aceraceae (maple family)	
Acer pseudoplatanus	sycamore maple	Aceraceae (maple family)	
Acer pseudosieboldianum	Korean maple	Aceraceae (maple family)	
Acer rubrum	red maple	Aceraceae (maple family)	
Acer rufinerve	red-veined maple	Aceraceae (maple family)	
Acer saccharinum	silver maple	Aceraceae (maple family)	
Acer saccharum	sugar maple	Aceraceae (maple family)	
Acer sempervirens	Cretan maple	Aceraceae (maple family)	
Acer shirasawanum	Shirasawa's maple	Aceraceae (maple family)	
Acer sieboldianum	Siebold's maple	Aceraceae (maple family)	
Acer sinense	Campbell's maple	Aceraceae (maple family)	
Acer skutchii	Skutch's maple	Aceraceae (maple family)	
Acer spicatum	mountain maple; moose maple	Aceraceae (maple family)	
Acer stachyophyllum	birch-leaved maple	Aceraceae (maple family)	
Acer tataricum	Tatar maple	Aceraceae (maple family)	
Acer trautvetteri	red-bud maple; Trautvetter's maple	Aceraceae (maple family)	
Acer triflorum	three-flowered maple	Aceraceae (maple family)	
Acer truncatum	Shandong maple	Aceraceae (maple family)	
Acer ukurunduense	Ukurundu maple	Aceraceae (maple family)	
Acer velutinum	velvet maple	Aceraceae (maple family)	
Acer wilsonii	Wilson's maple	Aceraceae (maple family)	
Agavaceae: agave family
Cordyline: cordyline trees
Cordyline australis	cabbage tree	Agavaceae (agave family)	
Furcraea: furcraea
Furcraea roezlii	furcraea tree	Agavaceae (agave family)	
Nolina: nolina trees
Nolina recurvata	bottle palm; ponytail palm	Agavaceae (agave family)	
Yucca: yuccas
Yucca aloifolia	Spanish bayonet	Agavaceae (agave family)	
Yucca brevifolia	Joshua tree	Agavaceae (agave family)	
Yucca elephantipes	giant yucca	Agavaceae (agave family)	
Yucca gloriosa	moundlily yucca	Agavaceae (agave family)	
Yucca torreyi	Torrey's yucca; great yucca	Agavaceae (agave family)	
Anacardiaceae: cashew family
Anacardium: cashews
Anacardium occidentale	cashew	Anacardiaceae (cashew family)	
Cotinus: smoke trees
Cotinus coggygria	common smoke tree	Anacardiaceae (cashew family)	
Cotinus obovatus	American smoke tree	Anacardiaceae (cashew family)	
Harpephyllum: harpephyllum plum trees
Harpephyllum afrum	South African wild plum	Anacardiaceae (cashew family)	
Mangifera: mangos
Mangifera caesia	jack; binjai; Malaysian mango	Anacardiaceae (cashew family)	
Mangifera foetida	horse mango	Anacardiaceae (cashew family)	
Mangifera indica	common mango; Indian mango	Anacardiaceae (cashew family)	
Mangifera odorata	kuweni mango; kuwini; Saipan mango; fragrant mango	Anacardiaceae (cashew family)	
Mangifera persiciformis	peach mango	Anacardiaceae (cashew family)	
Mangifera siamensis	Thai mango	Anacardiaceae (cashew family)	
Mangifera sylvatica	Himalayan mango; pickling mango; Nepal mango	Anacardiaceae (cashew family)	
Metopium: poisonwoods
Metopium brownei	black poisonwood	Anacardiaceae (cashew family)	
Metopium toxiferum	Florida poisonwood	Anacardiaceae (cashew family)	
Pistacia: pistachios and terebinth
Pistacia chinensis	Chinese pistachio	Anacardiaceae (cashew family)	
Pistacia terebinthus	terebinth; Old World turpentine tree	Anacardiaceae (cashew family)	
Pistacia vera	pistachio	Anacardiaceae (cashew family)	
Rhus: sumacs
Rhus copallina	winged sumac; shiny sumac	Anacardiaceae (cashew family)	
Rhus glabra	smooth sumac	Anacardiaceae (cashew family)	
Rhus typhina	staghorn sumac	Anacardiaceae (cashew family)	
Schinus: pepper trees
Schinus molle	Peruvian pepper tree	Anacardiaceae (cashew family)	
Schinus terebinthifolius	Brazilian pepper tree	Anacardiaceae (cashew family)	
Spondias: mombins
Spondias dulcis	Tahitian apple; Otaheite apple; golden apple; ambarella	Anacardiaceae (cashew family)	
Spondias mombin	yellow mombin; Javanese hog plum	Anacardiaceae (cashew family)	
Spondias purpurea	red mombin; Spanish hog plum	Anacardiaceae (cashew family)	
Spondias tuberosa	umbú; imbu; Brazilian hog plum	Anacardiaceae (cashew family)	
Toxicodendron: poison sumacs (including poison-ivy and poison-oak)
Toxicodendron vernix	poison sumac	Anacardiaceae (cashew family)	
Toxicodendron vernicifluum	Chinese lacquer tree	Anacardiaceae (cashew family)	
Toxicodendron succedaneum	Japanese Hazenoki tree	Anacardiaceae (cashew family)	
Toxicodendron striatum	manzanillo	Anacardiaceae (cashew family)	
Toxicodendron rydbergii	western poison-ivy	Anacardiaceae (cashew family)	
Toxicodendron radicans	eastern poison-ivy	Anacardiaceae (cashew family)	
Toxicodendron pubescens	Atlantic poison-oak	Anacardiaceae (cashew family)	
Toxicodendron parviflorum	small-flowered poison sumac	Anacardiaceae (cashew family)	
Toxicodendron diversilobum	Pacific poison-oak	Anacardiaceae (cashew family)	
Toxicodendron calcicolum		Anacardiaceae (cashew family)	
Annonaceae: custard apple family
Annona: custard apples
Annona cherimola	cherimoya	Annonaceae (custard apple family)	
Annona glabra	pond apple	Annonaceae (custard apple family)	
Annona reticulata	custard apple; bullock's heart; bull's heart; cashiman; sitaphal; shareefah	Annonaceae (custard apple family)	
Annona squamosa	sweetsop; sugar-apple	Annonaceae (custard apple family)	
Asimina: pawpaws
Asimina angustifolia	slimleaf pawpaw	Annonaceae (custard apple family)	
Asimina incana	woolly pawpaw	Annonaceae (custard apple family)	
Asimina obovata	bigflower pawpaw	Annonaceae (custard apple family)	
Asimina parviflora	smallflower pawpaw	Annonaceae (custard apple family)	
Asimina pygmaea	dwarf pawpaw	Annonaceae (custard apple family)	
Asimina reticulata	netted pawpaw	Annonaceae (custard apple family)	
Asimina tetramera	fourpetal pawpaw	Annonaceae (custard apple family)	
Asimina triloba	common pawpaw; prairie banana	Annonaceae (custard apple family)	
Apocynaceae: dogbane family
Cascabela: yellow oleanders
Cascabela thevetia	Peruvian oleander; lucky nut; yellow oleander	Apocynaceae (dogbane family)	
Cascabela thevetioides	giant thevetia; be-still tree	Apocynaceae (dogbane family)	
Nerium: oleander
Nerium oleander	oleander	Apocynaceae (dogbane family)	
Plumeria: frangipani trees
Plumeria alba	white frangipani	Apocynaceae (dogbane family)	
Plumeria inodora	odorless frangipani	Apocynaceae (dogbane family)	
Plumeria obtusa	Singapore frangipani	Apocynaceae (dogbane family)	
Plumeria rubra	red frangipani; temple tree	Apocynaceae (dogbane family)	
Aquifoliaceae: holly family
Ilex: holly trees
Ilex ambigua	Carolina holly	Aquifoliaceae (holly family)	
Ilex amelanchier	serviceberry holly; sarvis holly	Aquifoliaceae (holly family)	
Ilex aquifolium	European holly	Aquifoliaceae (holly family)	
Ilex cassine	dahoon	Aquifoliaceae (holly family)	
Ilex coriacea	sweet gallberry; large gallberry holly	Aquifoliaceae (holly family)	
Ilex cornuta	Chinese holly	Aquifoliaceae (holly family)	
Ilex decidua	possumhaw; possumhaw holly	Aquifoliaceae (holly family)	
Ilex krugiana	tawnyberry holly	Aquifoliaceae (holly family)	
Ilex laevigata	smooth winterberry	Aquifoliaceae (holly family)	
Ilex longipes	Georgia holly	Aquifoliaceae (holly family)	
Ilex montana	mountain winterberry	Aquifoliaceae (holly family)	
Ilex myrtifolia	myrtle-leaved holly	Aquifoliaceae (holly family)	
Ilex opaca	American holly	Aquifoliaceae (holly family)	
Ilex verticillata	common winterberry	Aquifoliaceae (holly family)	
Ilex vomitoria	yaupon; yaupon holly	Aquifoliaceae (holly family)	
Nemopanthus: false holly trees
Nemopanthus mucronatus	mountain holly; alpine holly	Aquifoliaceae (holly family)	
Araliaceae: ginseng family
Aralia: aralias
Aralia elata	Japanese angelica tree; Japanese aralia	Araliaceae (ginseng family)	
Aralia spinosa	Devil's walkingstick	Araliaceae (ginseng family)	
Cussonia: cussonia trees
Cussonia spicata	spiked cabbage tree	Araliaceae (ginseng family)	
Didymopanax: didymopanax trees
Didymopanax morototoni	yagrumo macho	Araliaceae (ginseng family)	
Meryta: meryta trees
Meryta sinclairii	puka; pukanui	Araliaceae (ginseng family)	
Heptapleurum: heptapleurum trees
Heptapleurum actinophyllum	octopus tree; umbrella tree	Araliaceae (ginseng family)	
Arecaceae: palm family
Acoelorraphe: acoelorraphe palm trees
Acoelorraphe wrightii	Everglades palm	Arecaceae (palm family)	
Archontophoenix: archontophoenix palm trees
Archontophoenix alexandrae	Alexandra palm	Arecaceae (palm family)	
Archontophoenix cunninghamiana	king palm	Arecaceae (palm family)	
Arenga: arenga palm trees
Arenga engleri	Formosa palm	Arecaceae (palm family)	
Bactris: bactris palm trees
Bactris gasipaes	pejibaye palm	Arecaceae (palm family)	
Bismarckia: bismarckia palm trees
Bismarckia nobilis	Bismarck palm	Arecaceae (palm family)	
Brahea: brahea palm trees
Brahea armata	Mexican blue palm	Arecaceae (palm family)	
Brahea brandegeei	San Jose hesper palm	Arecaceae (palm family)	
Brahea edulis	Guadalupe palm	Arecaceae (palm family)	
Butia: pindo palm trees
Butia capitata	jelly pindo palm	Arecaceae (palm family)	
Butia yatay	yatay pindo palm	Arecaceae (palm family)	
Caryota: caryota palm trees
Caryota gigas	Thai mountain fishtail palm	Arecaceae (palm family)	
Chamaerops: chamaerops palm trees
Chamaerops humilis	Mediterranean fan palm	Arecaceae (palm family)	
Cocos: cocos palm trees
Cocos nucifera	coconut palm	Arecaceae (palm family)	
Dypsis: dypsis palm trees
Dypsis decaryi	triangle palm	Arecaceae (palm family)	
Dypsis lutescens	cane palm; yellow palm	Arecaceae (palm family)	
Howea: howea palm trees
Howea forsteriana	kentia palm	Arecaceae (palm family)	
Hyophorbe: hyophorbe palm trees
Hyophorbe verschaffeltii	spindle palm	Arecaceae (palm family)	
Jubaea: jubaea palm trees
Jubaea chilensis	Chilean wine palm	Arecaceae (palm family)	
Livistona: livistona palm trees
Livistona chinensis	Chinese fan palm	Arecaceae (palm family)	
Livistona decipiens	ribbon fan palm	Arecaceae (palm family)	
Lodoicea: lodoicea palm trees
Lodoicea maldivica	coco de mer palm; Maldive coconut; double coconut	Arecaceae (palm family)	
Phoenix: date palms
Phoenix canariensis	Canary Island palm	Arecaceae (palm family)	
Phoenix dactylifera	date palm	Arecaceae (palm family)	
Phoenix reclinata	Senegal date palm	Arecaceae (palm family)	
Phoenix roebelenii	pygmy date palm	Arecaceae (palm family)	
Phoenix rupicola	cliff date palm	Arecaceae (palm family)	
Phytelephas: ivory palms
Phytelephas aequatorialis	ivory nut palm	Arecaceae (palm family)	
Phytelephas macrocarpa	tagua palm	Arecaceae (palm family)	
Raphia: raphia palm trees
Raphia farinifera	raffia palm	Arecaceae (palm family)	
Ravenea: ravenea palm trees
Ravenea rivularis	majesty palm	Arecaceae (palm family)	
Rhapis: rhapis palm trees
Rhapis excelsa	lady palm	Arecaceae (palm family)	
Rhapis humilis	slender lady palm	Arecaceae (palm family)	
Rhopalostylis: rhopalostylis palm trees
Rhopalostylis baueri	Norfolk Island palm	Arecaceae (palm family)	
Rhopalostylis sapida	nikau palm	Arecaceae (palm family)	
Roystonea: royal palms
Roystonea elata	Florida royal palm	Arecaceae (palm family)	
Roystonea regia	Cuban royal palm	Arecaceae (palm family)	
Sabal: sabal palms
Sabal causiarum	Puerto Rican hat palm	Arecaceae (palm family)	
Sabal palmetto	cabbage palmetto	Arecaceae (palm family)	
Sabal rosei	Llanos palmetto	Arecaceae (palm family)	
Sabal uresana	Sonoran palmetto	Arecaceae (palm family)	
Serenoa: serenoa palm trees
Serenoa repens	saw palmetto	Arecaceae (palm family)	
Syagrus: syagrus palm trees
Syagrus romanzoffiana	queen palm	Arecaceae (palm family)	
Trachycarpus: fan palm trees
Trachycarpus fortunei	Chusan palm	Arecaceae (palm family)	
Washingtonia: washingtonia palm trees
Washingtonia filifera	California fan palm	Arecaceae (palm family)	
Washingtonia robusta	Mexican fan palm	Arecaceae (palm family)	
Wodyetia: wodyetia palm trees
Wodyetia bifurcata	foxtail palm	Arecaceae (palm family)	
Asphodelaceae: asphodel family
Aloidendron: tree-aloes
Aloidendron barberae	giant tree aloe	Asphodelaceae (asphodel family)	
Aloidendron dichotomum	quiver tree	Asphodelaceae (asphodel family)	
Asteraceae: sunflower family
Baccharis:
Baccharis halimifolia	eastern baccharis; groundsel bush; silverling	Asteraceae (sunflower family)	
Brachylaena:
Brachylaena huillensis	muhuhu	Asteraceae (sunflower family)	
Lepidaploa:
Lepidaploa polypleura		Asteraceae (sunflower family)	
Montanoa:
Montanoa hexagona		Asteraceae (sunflower family)	
Montanoa revealii		Asteraceae (sunflower family)	
Telanthophora:
Telanthophora uspantanensis		Asteraceae (sunflower family)	
Betulaceae: birch family
Alnus: alders
Alnus acuminata	Andean alder	Betulaceae (birch family)	
Alnus alnobetula	green alder	Betulaceae (birch family)	
Alnus cordata	Italian alder	Betulaceae (birch family)	
Alnus cremastogyne	long-peduncled alder	Betulaceae (birch family)	
Alnus formosana	Formosan alder; Formosa alder	Betulaceae (birch family)	
Alnus fruticosa	Siberian alder	Betulaceae (birch family)	
Alnus glutinosa	European alder	Betulaceae (birch family)	
Alnus incana	grey alder	Betulaceae (birch family)	
Alnus japonica	Japanese alder	Betulaceae (birch family)	
Alnus jorullensis	Mexican alder	Betulaceae (birch family)	
Alnus maritima	seaside alder	Betulaceae (birch family)	
Alnus nepalensis	Nepalese alder	Betulaceae (birch family)	
Alnus nitida	Himalayan alder	Betulaceae (birch family)	
Alnus oblongifolia	Arizona alder	Betulaceae (birch family)	
Alnus orientalis	Oriental alder; Syrian alder	Betulaceae (birch family)	
Alnus rhombifolia	white alder	Betulaceae (birch family)	
Alnus rubra	red alder	Betulaceae (birch family)	
Alnus rugosa	speckled alder	Betulaceae (birch family)	
Alnus serrulata	common alder; hazel alder; tag alder; smooth alder	Betulaceae (birch family)	
Alnus sinuata	Sitka alder	Betulaceae (birch family)	
Alnus subcordata	Caucasian alder	Betulaceae (birch family)	
Alnus tenuifolia	mountain alder; thin-leaf alder	Betulaceae (birch family)	
Betula: birches
Betula × caerulea	blue birch; blueleaf birch	Betulaceae (birch family)	
Betula albosinensis	Chinese red birch	Betulaceae (birch family)	
Betula alleghaniensis	yellow birch	Betulaceae (birch family)	
Betula alnoides	alder-leaf birch	Betulaceae (birch family)	
Betula austrosinensis	South China birch	Betulaceae (birch family)	
Betula chinensis	Chinese dwarf birch	Betulaceae (birch family)	
Betula cordifolia	mountain paper birch; heartleaf birch	Betulaceae (birch family)	
Betula ermanii	Erman's birch	Betulaceae (birch family)	
Betula glandulosa	American dwarf birch	Betulaceae (birch family)	
Betula grossa	Japanese cherry birch	Betulaceae (birch family)	
Betula jacquemontii	white-barked Himalayan birch	Betulaceae (birch family)	
Betula kenaica	Kenai birch	Betulaceae (birch family)	
Betula lenta	sweet birch; cherry birch; black birch	Betulaceae (birch family)	
Betula mandschurica	Manchurian birch	Betulaceae (birch family)	
Betula maximowiczii	monarch birch	Betulaceae (birch family)	
Betula medwediewii	Caucasian birch	Betulaceae (birch family)	
Betula michauxii	Newfoundland dwarf birch	Betulaceae (birch family)	
Betula nana	dwarf birch; bog birch	Betulaceae (birch family)	
Betula neoalaskana	Alaska birch; Yukon birch	Betulaceae (birch family)	
Betula nigra	river birch	Betulaceae (birch family)	
Betula occidentalis	water birch; western birch; red birch	Betulaceae (birch family)	
Betula papyrifera	paper birch; canoe birch; American white birch	Betulaceae (birch family)	
Betula pendula	silver birch	Betulaceae (birch family)	
Betula platyphylla	Siberian silver birch	Betulaceae (birch family)	
Betula populifolia	gray birch	Betulaceae (birch family)	
Betula pubescens	downy birch	Betulaceae (birch family)	
Betula pumila	swamp birch	Betulaceae (birch family)	
Betula szechuanica	Sichuan birch	Betulaceae (birch family)	
Betula uber	Ashe's birch; Virginia birch; roundleaf birch	Betulaceae (birch family)	
Betula utilis	Himalayan birch	Betulaceae (birch family)	
Carpinus: hornbeams
Carpinus betulus	European hornbeam	Betulaceae (birch family)	
Carpinus caroliniana	American hornbeam	Betulaceae (birch family)	
Corylus: hazels
Corylus americana	American hazel; American hazelnut	Betulaceae (birch family)	
Corylus avellana	common hazel	Betulaceae (birch family)	
Corylus colurna	Turkish hazel	Betulaceae (birch family)	
Corylus cornuta	beaked hazel; beaked hazelnut	Betulaceae (birch family)	
Corylus maxima	filbert	Betulaceae (birch family)	
Ostrya: hop-hornbeams
Ostrya carpinifolia	European hop-hornbeam	Betulaceae (birch family)	
Ostrya virginiana	American hop-hornbeam; ironwood	Betulaceae (birch family)	
Bignoniaceae: trumpet creeper family
Amphitecna: calabash
Amphitecna latifolia	black calabash	Bignoniaceae (trumpet creeper family)	
Catalpa: catalpa trees
Catalpa bignonioides	southern catalpa	Bignoniaceae (trumpet creeper family)	
Catalpa speciosa	northern catalpa	Bignoniaceae (trumpet creeper family)	
Handroanthus:
Handroanthus heptaphyllus		Bignoniaceae (trumpet creeper family)	
Handroanthus impetiginosus	purple tabebuia; purple trumpet tree	Bignoniaceae (trumpet creeper family)	
Jacaranda: jacaranda trees
Jacaranda mimosifolia	blue jacaranda; black poui	Bignoniaceae (trumpet creeper family)	
Kigelia: sausage trees
Kigelia africana	African sausage tree	Bignoniaceae (trumpet creeper family)	
Markhamia: markhamia trees
Markhamia lutea	markhamia; Nile tulip tree; siala	Bignoniaceae (trumpet creeper family)	
Paulownia: paulownia trees
Paulownia tomentosa	empress tree; princess tree; foxglove tree; paulownia	Bignoniaceae (trumpet creeper family)	
Radermachera: radermachera trees
Radermachera sinica	China doll tree; serpent tree	Bignoniaceae (trumpet creeper family)	
Spathodea: spathodea trees
Spathodea campanulata	African tulip tree	Bignoniaceae (trumpet creeper family)	
Tabebuia: trumpet trees
Tabebuia caraiba	yellow tabebuia	Bignoniaceae (trumpet creeper family)	
Tabebuia chrysantha	golden trumpet	Bignoniaceae (trumpet creeper family)	
Tabebuia chrysotricha	golden trumpet	Bignoniaceae (trumpet creeper family)	
Tabebuia heterophylla	pink trumpet tree	Bignoniaceae (trumpet creeper family)	
Tabebuia rosea	rosy trumpet tree	Bignoniaceae (trumpet creeper family)	
Tabebuia roseo-alba	ipê-branco; lapacho blanco	Bignoniaceae (trumpet creeper family)	
Tecoma: tecoma trees
Tecoma stans	yellow tecoma; yellow bells	Bignoniaceae (trumpet creeper family)	
Bombacaceae: bombax family
Adansonia: baobab trees
Adansonia digitata	African baobab; monkeybread tree	Bombacaceae (bombax family)	
Adansonia grandidieri	Grandidier's baobab	Bombacaceae (bombax family)	
Adansonia gregorii	boab; Australian baobab	Bombacaceae (bombax family)	
Adansonia madagascariensis	Madagascar baobab	Bombacaceae (bombax family)	
Adansonia perrieri	Perrier's baobab	Bombacaceae (bombax family)	
Adansonia rubrostipa	fony baobab	Bombacaceae (bombax family)	
Adansonia suarezensis	Suarez baobab	Bombacaceae (bombax family)	
Adansonia za	za baobab	Bombacaceae (bombax family)	
Bombax: bombax trees
Bombax buonopozense	Gold Coast bombax; red-flowered silk cotton tree	Bombacaceae (bombax family)	
Bombax ceiba	cotton tree; tree cotton	Bombacaceae (bombax family)	
Ceiba: ceiba trees
Ceiba pentandra	kapok tree; ceiba	Bombacaceae (bombax family)	
Ceiba speciosa	floss silk tree	Bombacaceae (bombax family)	
Durio: durians
Durio graveolens	durian merah; durian burong	Bombacaceae (bombax family)	
Durio kutejensis	durian pulu; durian merah; nyekak; lai	Bombacaceae (bombax family)	
Durio zibethinus	durian; civet fruit	Bombacaceae (bombax family)	
Ochroma: ochroma trees
Ochroma pyramidale	balsa	Bombacaceae (bombax family)	
Boraginaceae: borage family
Bourreria: strongbarks
Bourreria ovata	Bahamian strongbark	Boraginaceae (borage family)	
Bourreria radula	rough strongbark	Boraginaceae (borage family)	
Cordia: cordia trees
Cordia alliodora	capa prieto	Boraginaceae (borage family)	
Burseraceae: bursera family
Bursera: bursera trees
Bursera simaruba	gumbo-limbo; West Indian birch; tourist tree	Burseraceae (bursera family)	
Dacryodes: dacryodes trees
Dacryodes excelsa	tabonuco	Burseraceae (bursera family)	
Buxaceae: box family
Buxus: box shrubs
Buxus austro-yunnanensis	Yunnan box	Buxaceae (box family)	
Buxus balearica	Balearic box	Buxaceae (box family)	
Buxus colchica	Georgian box	Buxaceae (box family)	
Buxus hainanensis	Hainan box	Buxaceae (box family)	
Buxus harlandii	Harland's box	Buxaceae (box family)	
Buxus henryi	Henry's box	Buxaceae (box family)	
Buxus humbertii	Humbert's box	Buxaceae (box family)	
Buxus hyrcana	Caspian box	Buxaceae (box family)	
Buxus macowanii	Cape box	Buxaceae (box family)	
Buxus madagascarica	Madagascan box	Buxaceae (box family)	
Buxus microphylla	Japanese box	Buxaceae (box family)	
Buxus natalensis	Natal box	Buxaceae (box family)	
Buxus sempervirens	common box; European box	Buxaceae (box family)	
Buxus sinica	Chinese box	Buxaceae (box family)	
Buxus vahlii	Vahl's box; smooth box	Buxaceae (box family)	
Buxus wallichiana	Himalayan box	Buxaceae (box family)	
Canellaceae: wild cinnamon family
Canella: wild cinnamon
Canella winterana	pepper cinnamon; cinnamonbark; winter cinnamon	Canellaceae (wild cinnamon family)	
Cannabaceae: hemp family
Celtis: hackberries and sugarberries
Celtis aetnensis	Sicilian hackberry; Mt. Etna hackberry	Cannabaceae (hemp family)	
Celtis africana	white stinkwood	Cannabaceae (hemp family)	
Celtis australis	European nettle-tree	Cannabaceae (hemp family)	
Celtis bungeana	Bunge's hackberry	Cannabaceae (hemp family)	
Celtis caucasica	Caucasian nettle-tree	Cannabaceae (hemp family)	
Celtis integrifolia	African hackberry	Cannabaceae (hemp family)	
Celtis jessoensis	Japanese hackberry	Cannabaceae (hemp family)	
Celtis koraiensis	Korean hackberry	Cannabaceae (hemp family)	
Celtis labilis	Hubei hackberry	Cannabaceae (hemp family)	
Celtis laevigata	southern hackberry; sugar hackberry; sugarberry	Cannabaceae (hemp family)	
Celtis lindheimeri	Lindheimer hackberry	Cannabaceae (hemp family)	
Celtis occidentalis	common hackberry; northern hackberry	Cannabaceae (hemp family)	
Celtis pallida	spiny hackberry; granjeno	Cannabaceae (hemp family)	
Celtis reticulata	net-leaved hackberry	Cannabaceae (hemp family)	
Celtis sinensis	Chinese hackberry	Cannabaceae (hemp family)	
Celtis tala	tala	Cannabaceae (hemp family)	
Celtis tenuifolia	dwarf hackberry; Georgia hackberry	Cannabaceae (hemp family)	
Celtis tournefortii	Oriental hackberry	Cannabaceae (hemp family)	
Trema: tremas
Trema micrantha	Florida trema	Cannabaceae (hemp family)	
Trema orientalis	Oriental trema; nalita	Cannabaceae (hemp family)	
Capparidaceae: caper family
Capparis: caper bushes
Capparis cynophallophora	Jamaican caper	Capparidaceae (caper family)	
Capparis flexuosa	limber caper	Capparidaceae (caper family)	
Capparis spinosa	caperbush; caper bud; caper berry; prickly caper	Capparidaceae (caper family)	
Caprifoliaceae: honeysuckle family
Sambucus: elders
Sambucus caerulea	blue-berried elder	Caprifoliaceae (honeysuckle family)	
Sambucus canadensis	American elder	Caprifoliaceae (honeysuckle family)	
Sambucus nigra	common elder; black elder	Caprifoliaceae (honeysuckle family)	
Sambucus racemosa	red-berried elder	Caprifoliaceae (honeysuckle family)	
Viburnum: viburnum and blackhaws
Viburnum burejaeticum	Manchurian viburnum	Caprifoliaceae (honeysuckle family)	
Viburnum cassinoides	possumhaw; possumhaw viburnum	Caprifoliaceae (honeysuckle family)	
Viburnum edule	squashberry; squashberry viburnum	Caprifoliaceae (honeysuckle family)	
Viburnum lantana	wayfaring viburnum	Caprifoliaceae (honeysuckle family)	
Viburnum lentago	nannyberry	Caprifoliaceae (honeysuckle family)	
Viburnum nudum	naked possumhaw; naked possumhaw viburnum	Caprifoliaceae (honeysuckle family)	
Viburnum obovatum	small-leaf viburnum	Caprifoliaceae (honeysuckle family)	
Viburnum opulus	Guelder-rose	Caprifoliaceae (honeysuckle family)	
Viburnum prunifolium	blackhaw viburnum	Caprifoliaceae (honeysuckle family)	
Viburnum rufidulum	rusty blackhaw; rusty viburnum	Caprifoliaceae (honeysuckle family)	
Viburnum suspensum	sandankwa; sandankwa viburnum	Caprifoliaceae (honeysuckle family)	
Viburnum trilobum	cranberry viburnum	Caprifoliaceae (honeysuckle family)	
Caricaceae: papaya family
Carica: papaya
Carica papaya	papaya	Caricaceae (papaya family)	
Casuarinaceae: casuarina family
Casuarina: beefwoods
Casuarina cunninghamiana	Cunningham beefwood	Casuarinaceae (casuarina family)	
Casuarina equisetifolia	Australian beefwood; horsetail casuarina	Casuarinaceae (casuarina family)	
Casuarina glauca	Brazilian beefwood	Casuarinaceae (casuarina family)	
Celastraceae: bittersweet family
Crossopetalum: crossopetalum shrubs
Crossopetalum ilicifolium	Christmasberry; quail berry; ground holly	Celastraceae (spindle family)	
Crossopetalum rhacoma	Florida crossopetalum; maidenberry	Celastraceae (spindle family)	
Euonymus: spindles
Euonymus alatus	winged spindle; winged euonymus	Celastraceae (spindle family)	
Euonymus atropurpureus	burning bush	Celastraceae (spindle family)	
Euonymus europaeus	European spindle	Celastraceae (spindle family)	
Euonymus fortunei	Fortune's spindle	Celastraceae (spindle family)	
Euonymus japonicus	Japanese spindle	Celastraceae (spindle family)	
Euonymus occidentalis	western spindle	Celastraceae (spindle family)	
Gyminda: false boxwoods
Gyminda latifolia	West Indian false boxwood	Celastraceae (spindle family)	
Maytenus: maytens
Maytenus boaria	mayten	Celastraceae (spindle family)	
Maytenus phyllanthoides	Florida mayten; guttapercha mayten; leatherleaf	Celastraceae (spindle family)	
Schaefferia: schaefferia trees
Schaefferia frutescens	Florida boxwood	Celastraceae (spindle family)	
Cercidiphyllaceae: katsura family
Cercidiphyllum: cercidiphyllum trees
Cercidiphyllum japonicum	katsura	Cercidiphyllaceae (katsura family)	
Chrysobalanaceae: coco plum family
Chrysobalanus: chrysobalanus trees
Chrysobalanus icaco	coco plum	Chrysobalanaceae (coco plum family)	
Maranthes: maranthes trees
Maranthes corymbosa	merbatu; sea beam	Chrysobalanaceae (coco plum family)	
Maranthes panamensis	corozo; palo de gusano	Chrysobalanaceae (coco plum family)	
Maranthes polyandra	pera morada; Mayan pear	Chrysobalanaceae (coco plum family)	
Clusiaceae: St. John's wort family
Calophyllum: calophyllum
Calophyllum calaba	Maria tree; Santa Maria tree	Clusiaceae (St. John's wort family)	
Clusia: clusia trees
Clusia rosea	Florida clusia; rose clusia	Clusiaceae (St. John's wort family)	
Garcinia: garcinia trees
Garcinia mangostana	mangosteen	Clusiaceae (St. John's wort family)	
Combretaceae: combretum family
Conocarpus: buttonwoods
Conocarpus erectus	button mangrove; false mangrove; Florida buttonwood; grey mangrove; Zaragoza mangrove	Combretaceae (combretum family)	
Laguncularia: laguncularia trees
Laguncularia racemosa	white mangrove	Combretaceae (combretum family)	
Terminalia: terminalia trees
Terminalia catappa	Indian almond	Combretaceae (combretum family)	
Cornaceae: dogwood family
Cornus: dogwoods
Cornus alternifolia	alternate-leaved dogwood	Cornaceae (dogwood family)	
Cornus asperifolia	stiff cornel dogwood	Cornaceae (dogwood family)	
Cornus drummondii	roughleaf dogwood	Cornaceae (dogwood family)	
Cornus florida	flowering dogwood	Cornaceae (dogwood family)	
Cornus kousa	Kousa dogwood	Cornaceae (dogwood family)	
Cornus mas	cornelian dogwood	Cornaceae (dogwood family)	
Cornus nuttallii	western flowering dogwood; Pacific flowering dogwood	Cornaceae (dogwood family)	
Cornus racemosa	grey dogwood	Cornaceae (dogwood family)	
Cornus sanguinea	common dogwood	Cornaceae (dogwood family)	
Cornus stolonifera	red osier dogwood	Cornaceae (dogwood family)	
Cornus stricta	swamp dogwood	Cornaceae (dogwood family)	
Cyrillaceae: titi family
Cliftonia: cliftonia trees
Cliftonia monophylla	buckwheat tree; cliftonia	Cyrillaceae (titi family)	
Cyrilla: cyrilla trees
Cyrilla parvifolia	little-leaf cyrilla	Cyrillaceae (titi family)	
Cyrilla racemiflora	titi; swamp cyrilla	Cyrillaceae (titi family)	
Davidsoniaceae: Davidson's plum family
Davidsonia: Davidson's plum trees
Davidsonia jerseyana	Davidson's plum; Mullumbimby plum	Davidsoniaceae (Davidson's plum family)	
Davidsonia johnsonii	smooth Davidson's plum	Davidsoniaceae (Davidson's plum family)	
Davidsonia pruriens	North Queensland Davidson's plum	Davidsoniaceae (Davidson's plum family)	
Ebenaceae: ebony family
Diospyros: ebony and persimmons
Diospyros digyna	black sapote	Ebenaceae (ebony family)	
Diospyros ebenum	ebony; Indian ebony	Ebenaceae (ebony family)	
Diospyros kaki	kaki; Japanese persimmon	Ebenaceae (ebony family)	
Diospyros texana	Texas persimmon	Ebenaceae (ebony family)	
Diospyros virginiana	American persimmon; eastern persimmon	Ebenaceae (ebony family)	
Elaeagnaceae: oleaster family
Elaeagnus: elaeagnus trees
Elaeagnus angustifolia	oleaster	Elaeagnaceae (oleaster family)	
Elaeagnus commutata	silverberry	Elaeagnaceae (oleaster family)	
Elaeagnus pungens	spotted elaeagnus; silverthorn	Elaeagnaceae (oleaster family)	
Hippophae: sea-buckthorns
Hippophae rhamnoides	sea-buckthorn	Elaeagnaceae (oleaster family)	
Shepherdia: buffalo berries
Shepherdia argentea	silver buffalo berry	Elaeagnaceae (oleaster family)	
Ericaceae: heath family
Arbutus: arbutus
Arbutus andrachne	Cyprus strawberry-tree	Ericaceae (heath family)	
Arbutus menziesii	Pacific madrone	Ericaceae (heath family)	
Arbutus unedo	strawberry-tree	Ericaceae (heath family)	
Arbutus xalapensis	Mexican madrone	Ericaceae (heath family)	
Clethra: pepperbush
Clethra acuminata	sweet pepperbush	Ericaceae (heath family)	
Clethra arborea	lily-of-the-valley tree	Ericaceae (heath family)	
Elliottia: elliottia trees
Elliottia racemosa	elliottia; southern plum	Ericaceae (heath family)	
Erica: heaths
Erica arborea	tree heath	Ericaceae (heath family)	
Kalmia: kalmia shrubs
Kalmia latifolia	mountain-laurel	Ericaceae (heath family)	
Lyonia: lyonia trees
Lyonia ferruginea	tree lyonia	Ericaceae (heath family)	
Oxydendrum: oxydendrum trees
Oxydendrum arboreum	sourwood	Ericaceae (heath family)	
Rhododendron: rhododendrons
Rhododendron albiflorum	white-flowered rhododendron	Ericaceae (heath family)	
Rhododendron arboreum	tree rhododendron	Ericaceae (heath family)	
Rhododendron calendulaceum	flame azalea	Ericaceae (heath family)	
Rhododendron catawbiense	purple rhododendron; Catawba rhododendron	Ericaceae (heath family)	
Rhododendron macrophyllum	Pacific rhododendron	Ericaceae (heath family)	
Rhododendron maximum	great rhododendron; rosebay rhododendron	Ericaceae (heath family)	
Rhododendron occidentale	western azalea; Pacific azalea	Ericaceae (heath family)	
Rhododendron periclymenoides	pinxterbloom azalea	Ericaceae (heath family)	
Rhododendron ponticum	Pontic rhododendron	Ericaceae (heath family)	
Vaccinium: blueberries, cranberries, and sparkleberries
Vaccinium arboreum	sparkleberry; farkleberry	Ericaceae (heath family)	
Vaccinium corymbosum	highbush blueberry	Ericaceae (heath family)	
Euphorbiaceae: spurge family
Aleurites: aleurites trees
Aleurites fordii	tung tree	Euphorbiaceae (spurge family)	
Aleurites moluccanus	candlenut	Euphorbiaceae (spurge family)	
Drypetes: drypetes trees
Drypetes diversifolia	milkbark	Euphorbiaceae (spurge family)	
Drypetes lateriflora	Guiana plum	Euphorbiaceae (spurge family)	
Euphorbia: spurge trees
Euphorbia candelabrum	candelabra tree	Euphorbiaceae (spurge family)	
Euphorbia cotinifolia	Caribbean copper plant	Euphorbiaceae (spurge family)	
Euphorbia ingens	candelabra tree	Euphorbiaceae (spurge family)	
Euphorbia tetragona	naboom	Euphorbiaceae (spurge family)	
Euphorbia tirucalli	pencil spurge	Euphorbiaceae (spurge family)	
Gymnanthes: gymnanthes trees
Gymnanthes lucida	crabwood	Euphorbiaceae (spurge family)	
Hevea: rubber trees
Hevea brasiliensis	Pará rubber tree; rubber tree	Euphorbiaceae (spurge family)	
Hippomane: hippomane trees
Hippomane mancinella	manchineel	Euphorbiaceae (spurge family)	
Manihot: cassava
Manihot esculenta	cassava; manioc; manihot	Euphorbiaceae (spurge family)	
Manihot grahamii	wild cassava; Graham's cassava	Euphorbiaceae (spurge family)	
Savia: maidenbushes
Savia bahamensis	Bahamian maidenbush	Euphorbiaceae (spurge family)	
Triadica: tallow trees
Triadica sebifera	Chinese tallow tree	Euphorbiaceae (spurge family)	
Fabaceae: legume family (peas)
Acacia: acacias and wattles
Acacia albida	winter thorn acacia	Fabaceae (legume family (peas))	
Acacia aneura	mulga acacia	Fabaceae (legume family (peas))	
Acacia angustissima	prairie acacia	Fabaceae (legume family (peas))	
Acacia baileyana 'Purpurea'	purple-leaf acacia	Fabaceae (legume family (peas))	
Acacia choriophylla	cinnecord	Fabaceae (legume family (peas))	
Acacia crassifolia	butterfly-leafed acacia; bauhinia-leafed acacia	Fabaceae (legume family (peas))	
Acacia dealbata	silver wattle	Fabaceae (legume family (peas))	
Acacia farnesiana	sweet acacia	Fabaceae (legume family (peas))	
Acacia greggii	catclaw acacia	Fabaceae (legume family (peas))	
Acacia koa	koa	Fabaceae (legume family (peas))	
Acacia longifolia	Sydney golden wattle	Fabaceae (legume family (peas))	
Acacia macracantha	longspine acacia	Fabaceae (legume family (peas))	
Acacia mearnsii	black wattle	Fabaceae (legume family (peas))	
Acacia melanoxylon	Australian blackwood	Fabaceae (legume family (peas))	
Acacia pendula	weeping acacia	Fabaceae (legume family (peas))	
Acacia pycnantha	golden wattle	Fabaceae (legume family (peas))	
Acacia tortilis	umbrella tree; tortilis	Fabaceae (legume family (peas))	
Acacia tortuosa	huisachillo	Fabaceae (legume family (peas))	
Acacia xanthophloea	yellow-fever tree	Fabaceae (legume family (peas))	
Albizia: silk trees and false acacias
Albizia julibrissin	silk tree; Persian silk tree	Fabaceae (legume family (peas))	
Albizia lebbeck	lebbeck	Fabaceae (legume family (peas))	
Albizia saman	saman; rain tree; monkeypod	Fabaceae (legume family (peas))	
Bauhinia: orchid trees
Bauhinia purpurea	purple orchid tree	Fabaceae (legume family (peas))	
Bauhinia variegata	pink orchid tree	Fabaceae (legume family (peas))	
Caesalpinia: bird-of-paradise trees
Caesalpinia echinata	pau ferro; brazilwood; pau-brasil; pau de Pernambuco; ibirapitanga	Fabaceae (legume family (peas))	
Caesalpinia mexicana	Mexican bird-of-paradise tree	Fabaceae (legume family (peas))	
Caesalpinia pulcherrima	red bird-of-paradise tree; flowerfence poinciana	Fabaceae (legume family (peas))	
Caragana: Asian pea trees
Caragana arborescens	Siberian pea tree	Fabaceae (legume family (peas))	
Cassia: cassias
Cassia leptophylla	gold medallion tree	Fabaceae (legume family (peas))	
Centrolobium:
Centrolobium robustum	canary wood	Fabaceae (legume family (peas))	
Ceratonia: ceratonia trees
Ceratonia siliqua	carob tree	Fabaceae (legume family (peas))	
Cercis: redbuds
Cercis canadensis	eastern redbud	Fabaceae (legume family (peas))	
Cercis occidentalis	western redbud	Fabaceae (legume family (peas))	
Cercis siliquastrum	Judas-tree	Fabaceae (legume family (peas))	
Cladrastis: yellowwoods
Cladrastis kentukea	Kentucky yellowwood	Fabaceae (legume family (peas))	
Dalbergia: true rosewoods
Dalbergia bariensis	Burmese rosewood	Fabaceae (legume family (peas))	
Dalbergia baronii	Madagascar rosewood; madaga	Fabaceae (legume family (peas))	
Dalbergia congestifloria	kingwood	Fabaceae (legume family (peas))	
Dalbergia decipularis	tulipwood	Fabaceae (legume family (peas))	
Dalbergia frutescens	pau rosa	Fabaceae (legume family (peas))	
Dalbergia latifolia	Indian rosewood	Fabaceae (legume family (peas))	
Dalbergia melanoxylon	African blackwood; mpingo	Fabaceae (legume family (peas))	
Dalbergia retusa	cocobolo	Fabaceae (legume family (peas))	
Dalbergia stevensonii	Honduran rosewood	Fabaceae (legume family (peas))	
Delonix: poincianas
Delonix regia	royal poinciana; flamboyant	Fabaceae (legume family (peas))	
Dermatophyllum: mescalbeans
Dermatophyllum secundiflorum	Texas mountain-laurel	Fabaceae (legume family (peas))	
Dialium:
Dialium guianense		Fabaceae (legume family (peas))	
Enterolobium:
Enterolobium cyclocarpum	elephant-ear tree	Fabaceae (legume family (peas))	
Erythrina: coral trees
Erythrina afra	coastal coral tree	Fabaceae (legume family (peas))	
Erythrina coralloides	naked coral tree	Fabaceae (legume family (peas))	
Erythrina falcata	Brazilian coral tree	Fabaceae (legume family (peas))	
Erythrina humeana	Natal coral tree	Fabaceae (legume family (peas))	
Gleditsia: false locust
Gleditsia aquatica	water locust	Fabaceae (legume family (peas))	
Gleditsia caspica	Caspian locust	Fabaceae (legume family (peas))	
Gleditsia triacanthos	honey locust	Fabaceae (legume family (peas))	
Guibourtia:
Guibourtia arnoldiana	bubinga; benge; benzi; bubinga	Fabaceae (legume family (peas))	
Guibourtia ehie	amazakoue; ovangkol; shedua	Fabaceae (legume family (peas))	
Gymnocladus: bymnocladus trees
Gymnocladus chinensis	Chinese coffeetree	Fabaceae (legume family (peas))	
Gymnocladus dioica	Kentucky coffeetree	Fabaceae (legume family (peas))	
Hymenaea:
Hymenaea courbaril	jatoba; Brazilian cherry	Fabaceae (legume family (peas))	
Inga: sugarpod trees
Inga edulis	ice cream bean	Fabaceae (legume family (peas))	
Laburnum: laburnum trees
Laburnum alpinum	Fabaceae (legume family (peas))		
Laburnum anagyroides	Fabaceae (legume family (peas))		
Leucaena: leucaena trees
Leucaena leucocephala	lead tree; white popinac	Fabaceae (legume family (peas))	
Lysiloma: lysiloma trees
Lysiloma latisiliquum	false tamarind; Bahamian wild tamarind	Fabaceae (legume family (peas))	
Machaerium: machaerium
Machaerium scleroxylon	Bolivian rosewood; morado	Fabaceae (legume family (peas))	
Millettia: millettia
Millettia laurentii	wenge	Fabaceae (legume family (peas))	
Mimosa: mimosas
Mimosa biuncifera	Arizona ironwood; mimosa	Fabaceae (legume family (peas))	
Myroxylon:
Myroxylon balsamum		Fabaceae (legume family (peas))	
Parkinsonia: parkinsonia trees
Parkinsonia aculeata	Jerusalem-thorn; Mexican palo verde	Fabaceae (legume family (peas))	
Peltogyne:
Peltogyne pubescens	purpleheart	Fabaceae (legume family (peas))	
Piscidia: fishpoison trees
Piscidia piscipula	Jamaican dogwood; Florida fishpoison tree	Fabaceae (legume family (peas))	
Pithecellobium: blackbeads
Pithecellobium guadalupense	Guadaloupe blackbead	Fabaceae (legume family (peas))	
Pithecellobium saman	monkeypod	Fabaceae (legume family (peas))	
Pithecellobium unguis-cati	catclaw blackbead	Fabaceae (legume family (peas))	
Platymiscium:
Platymiscium polystachyum	coyote	Fabaceae (legume family (peas))	
Prosopis: mesquites and kiawes
Prosopis glandulosa	honey mesquite	Fabaceae (legume family (peas))	
Prosopis juliflora	thorny kiawe; algaroba	Fabaceae (legume family (peas))	
Prosopis pallida	kiawe	Fabaceae (legume family (peas))	
Prosopis pubescens	screw bean; tornillo	Fabaceae (legume family (peas))	
Pterocarpus: padauks
Pterocarpus santalinus	red sanders; red sandalwood	Fabaceae (legume family (peas))	
Pterocarpus soyauxii	African padauk; African coralwood	Fabaceae (legume family (peas))	
Robinia: locusts
Robinia hispida	bristly locust; rose acacia	Fabaceae (legume family (peas))	
Robinia neomexicana	New Mexican locust	Fabaceae (legume family (peas))	
Robinia pseudoacacia	black locust	Fabaceae (legume family (peas))	
Robinia viscosa	clammy locust	Fabaceae (legume family (peas))	
Schizolobium:
Schizolobium parahyba	Brazilian fire tree	Fabaceae (legume family (peas))	
Senna: sennas
Senna marilandica	Maryland senna	Fabaceae (legume family (peas))	
Senna occidentalis	coffee senna	Fabaceae (legume family (peas))	
Sophora: sophoras
Sophora tomentosa	yellow necklacepod	Fabaceae (legume family (peas))	
Styphnolobium: necklacepods
Styphnolobium japonicum	pagoda tree	Fabaceae (legume family (peas))	
Styphnolobium affine	Eve's necklace	Fabaceae (legume family (peas))	
Tamarindus: tamarinds
Tamarindus indica	tamarind	Fabaceae (legume family (peas))	
Tipuana: tipuana trees
Tipuana tipu	tipu tree; rosewood	Fabaceae (legume family (peas))	
Vatairea:
Vatairea lundellii		Fabaceae (legume family (peas))	
Fagaceae: beech family
Castanea: chestnuts and chinkapins
Castanea alnifolia	Florida chinkapin	Fagaceae (beech family)	
Castanea dentata	American chestnut	Fagaceae (beech family)	
Castanea mollissima	Chinese chestnut	Fagaceae (beech family)	
Castanea ozarkensis	Ozark chinkapin	Fagaceae (beech family)	
Castanea pumila	Allegheny chinkapin; chinquapin	Fagaceae (beech family)	
Castanea sativa	sweet chestnut	Fagaceae (beech family)	
Castanopsis: castanopsis trees
Castanopsis cuspidata	Japanese chinkapin	Fagaceae (beech family)	
Castanopsis sieboldii	itajii chinkapin	Fagaceae (beech family)	
Chrysolepis: chrysolepis trees
Chrysolepis chrysophylla	golden chinquapin; giant chinquapin	Fagaceae (beech family)	
Chrysolepis sempervirens	bush chinquapin	Fagaceae (beech family)	
Fagus: beeches
Fagus grandifolia	American beech	Fagaceae (beech family)	
Fagus sylvatica	European beech	Fagaceae (beech family)	
Lithocarpus: stoneoaks
Lithocarpus cleistocarpus	stoneoak	Fagaceae (beech family)	
Lithocarpus henryi	Henry's stoneoak	Fagaceae (beech family)	
Notholithocarpus: tanoaks
Notholithocarpus densiflorus	tanoak	Fagaceae (beech family)	
Quercus: oaks
Quercus acutissima	sawtooth oak	Fagaceae (beech family)	
Quercus agrifolia	California live oak; coastal live oak	Fagaceae (beech family)	
Quercus alba	white oak	Fagaceae (beech family)	
Quercus arkansana	Arkansas oak	Fagaceae (beech family)	
Quercus austrina	bastard white oak	Fagaceae (beech family)	
Quercus bicolor	swamp white oak	Fagaceae (beech family)	
Quercus brantii	Brant's oak	Fagaceae (beech family)	
Quercus breviloba	shallow-lobed oak	Fagaceae (beech family)	
Quercus calliprinos	kermes oak	Fagaceae (beech family)	
Quercus cerris	Turkey oak	Fagaceae (beech family)	
Quercus chapmanii	Chapman oak	Fagaceae (beech family)	
Quercus chrysolepis	canyon live oak	Fagaceae (beech family)	
Quercus coccinea	scarlet oak	Fagaceae (beech family)	
Quercus ellipsoidalis	northern pin oak; Hill's oak	Fagaceae (beech family)	
Quercus falcata	southern red oak	Fagaceae (beech family)	
Quercus frainetto	Hungarian oak	Fagaceae (beech family)	
Quercus garryana	Oregon white oak; Garry oak	Fagaceae (beech family)	
Quercus geminata	sand live oak	Fagaceae (beech family)	
Quercus georgiana	Georgia oak	Fagaceae (beech family)	
Quercus hemisphaerica	laurel oak	Fagaceae (beech family)	
Quercus ilex	holm oak	Fagaceae (beech family)	
Quercus ilicifolia	scrub oak; bear oak	Fagaceae (beech family)	
Quercus imbricaria	shingle oak	Fagaceae (beech family)	
Quercus incana	bluejack oak; upland willow oak	Fagaceae (beech family)	
Quercus infectoria	Cyprus oak	Fagaceae (beech family)	
Quercus laevis	turkey oak	Fagaceae (beech family)	
Quercus laurifolia	swamp laurel oak	Fagaceae (beech family)	
Quercus lyrata	overcup oak	Fagaceae (beech family)	
Quercus macranthera	Caucasian oak; Persian oak	Fagaceae (beech family)	
Quercus macrocarpa	bur oak	Fagaceae (beech family)	
Quercus margaretta	sand post oak; shrubby oak	Fagaceae (beech family)	
Quercus marilandica	blackjack oak	Fagaceae (beech family)	
Quercus michauxii	swamp chestnut oak	Fagaceae (beech family)	
Quercus montana	chestnut oak; rock chestnut oak	Fagaceae (beech family)	
Quercus muehlenbergii	chinquapin oak	Fagaceae (beech family)	
Quercus myrtifolia	myrtle oak	Fagaceae (beech family)	
Quercus nigra	water oak	Fagaceae (beech family)	
Quercus nuttallii	Nuttall's oak	Fagaceae (beech family)	
Quercus oglethorpensis	Oglethorpe oak	Fagaceae (beech family)	
Quercus pagoda	cherrybark oak	Fagaceae (beech family)	
Quercus palustris	pin oak	Fagaceae (beech family)	
Quercus petraea	sessile oak	Fagaceae (beech family)	
Quercus phellos	willow oak	Fagaceae (beech family)	
Quercus pubescens	downy oak	Fagaceae (beech family)	
Quercus pyrenaica	Pyrenean oak	Fagaceae (beech family)	
Quercus robur	pedunculate oak; English oak	Fagaceae (beech family)	
Quercus rubra	northern red oak; red oak	Fagaceae (beech family)	
Quercus shumardii	Shumard oak	Fagaceae (beech family)	
Quercus similis	delta post oak	Fagaceae (beech family)	
Quercus sinuata	bastard oak	Fagaceae (beech family)	
Quercus stellata	post oak	Fagaceae (beech family)	
Quercus suber	cork oak	Fagaceae (beech family)	
Quercus velutina	black oak	Fagaceae (beech family)	
Quercus virginiana	southern live oak	Fagaceae (beech family)	
Grossulariaceae: gooseberry family
Ribes: currants and gooseberries
Ribes alpestris	hedge gooseberry	Grossulariaceae (gooseberry family)	
Ribes alpinum	alpine currant	Grossulariaceae (gooseberry family)	
Ribes aureum	golden currant	Grossulariaceae (gooseberry family)	
Ribes cynosbati	prickly gooseberry	Grossulariaceae (gooseberry family)	
Ribes grossularioides	Japanese gooseberry	Grossulariaceae (gooseberry family)	
Ribes hirtellum	North American gooseberry	Grossulariaceae (gooseberry family)	
Ribes nigrum	black currant	Grossulariaceae (gooseberry family)	
Ribes rubrum	red currant; cultivated currant	Grossulariaceae (gooseberry family)	
Ribes sanguineum	flowering currant; red-flowering currant	Grossulariaceae (gooseberry family)	
Ribes uva-crispa	common gooseberry	Grossulariaceae (gooseberry family)	
Hamamelidaceae: witch-hazel family
Hamamelis: hamamelis shrubs
Hamamelis virginiana	witch-hazel	Hamamelidaceae (witch-hazel family)	
Liquidambar: liquidambar trees
Liquidambar formosana	Chinese sweetgum	Hamamelidaceae (witch-hazel family)	
Liquidambar orientalis	Oriental sweetgum	Hamamelidaceae (witch-hazel family)	
Liquidambar styraciflua	American sweetgum	Hamamelidaceae (witch-hazel family)	
Loropetalum: fringe flowers
Loropetalum chinense	Chinese fringe flower; Chinese witch hazel	Hamamelidaceae (witch-hazel family)	
Hippocastanaceae: buckeye family
Aesculus: buckeyes and horse-chestnuts
Aesculus flava	yellow buckeye	Hippocastanaceae (buckeye family)	
Aesculus glabra	Ohio buckeye; fetid buckeye	Hippocastanaceae (buckeye family)	
Aesculus hippocastanum	horse-chestnut; common horse-chestnut	Hippocastanaceae (buckeye family)	
Aesculus indica	Indian horse-chestnut	Hippocastanaceae (buckeye family)	
Aesculus parviflora	bottlebrush buckeye	Hippocastanaceae (buckeye family)	
Aesculus pavia	red buckeye	Hippocastanaceae (buckeye family)	
Aesculus sylvatica	painted buckeye	Hippocastanaceae (buckeye family)	
Aesculus turbinata	Japanese horse-chestnut	Hippocastanaceae (buckeye family)	
Illiciaceae: anise-tree family
Illicium: anise-trees
Illicium floridanum	Florida anise-tree	Illiciaceae (anise-tree family)	
Illicium parviflorum	yellow anise-tree	Illiciaceae (anise-tree family)	
Juglandaceae: walnut family
Carya: hickories and pecans
Carya aquatica	water hickory	Juglandaceae (walnut family)	
Carya cordiformis	bitternut hickory	Juglandaceae (walnut family)	
Carya floridana	scrub hickory; Florida hickory	Juglandaceae (walnut family)	
Carya glabra	pignut hickory	Juglandaceae (walnut family)	
Carya illinoinensis	pecan	Juglandaceae (walnut family)	
Carya laciniosa	shellbark hickory	Juglandaceae (walnut family)	
Carya myristiciformis	nutmeg hickory	Juglandaceae (walnut family)	
Carya ovalis	red hickory	Juglandaceae (walnut family)	
Carya ovata	shagbark hickory	Juglandaceae (walnut family)	
Carya pallida	sand hickory; pale hickory	Juglandaceae (walnut family)	
Carya texana	black hickory	Juglandaceae (walnut family)	
Carya tomentosa	mockernut hickory	Juglandaceae (walnut family)	
Juglans: walnuts
Juglans cinerea	butternut; white walnut	Juglandaceae (walnut family)	
Juglans nigra	black walnut	Juglandaceae (walnut family)	
Juglans regia	Persian walnut; common walnut	Juglandaceae (walnut family)	
Lauraceae: laurel family
Cinnamomum: cinnamon and camphor
Cinnamomum aromaticum	Chinese cinnamon	Lauraceae (laurel family)	
Cinnamomum camphora	camphor tree; camphor laurel	Lauraceae (laurel family)	
Cinnamomum verum	cinnamon tree	Lauraceae (laurel family)	
Laurus: true laurels
Laurus nobilis	sweet bay laurel, poet's laurel	Lauraceae (laurel family)	
Licaria: licaria trees
Licaria triandra	Florida licaria	Lauraceae (laurel family)	
Nectandra: nectandra trees
Nectandra coriacea	lancewood	Lauraceae (laurel family)	
Persea: avocados
Persea americana	avocado; ashue	Lauraceae (laurel family)	
Persea borbonia	red bay	Lauraceae (laurel family)	
Persea palustris	swamp bay	Lauraceae (laurel family)	
Sassafras: sassafras trees
Sassafras albidum	sassafras	Lauraceae (laurel family)	
Umbellularia: umbellularia trees
Umbellularia californica	California laurel	Lauraceae (laurel family)	
Lecythidaceae: lecythis family
Bertholletia: bertholletia trees
Bertholletia excelsa	Brazil nut	Lecythidaceae (lecythis family)	
Couroupita: couroupita trees
Couroupita guianensis	cannonball tree	Lecythidaceae (lecythis family)	
Lythraceae: loosestrife family
Lagerstroemia: lagerstroemia trees
Lagerstroemia indica	crepe-myrtle	Lythraceae (loosestrife family)	
Magnoliaceae: magnolia family
Liriodendron: tulip-trees
Liriodendron chinense	Chinese tulip-tree	Magnoliaceae (magnolia family)	
Liriodendron tulipifera	American tulip-tree	Magnoliaceae (magnolia family)	
Magnolia: magnolias
Magnolia × soulangeana	saucer magnolia; tulip magnolia	Magnoliaceae (magnolia family)	
Magnolia acuminata	cucumber tree; cucumber magnolia	Magnoliaceae (magnolia family)	
Magnolia ashei	ashe magnolia	Magnoliaceae (magnolia family)	
Magnolia fraseri	Fraser magnolia	Magnoliaceae (magnolia family)	
Magnolia grandiflora	southern magnolia	Magnoliaceae (magnolia family)	
Magnolia liliiflora	lily magnolia	Magnoliaceae (magnolia family)	
Magnolia macrophylla	bigleaf magnolia	Magnoliaceae (magnolia family)	
Magnolia pyramidata	pyramid magnolia	Magnoliaceae (magnolia family)	
Magnolia stellata	star magnolia	Magnoliaceae (magnolia family)	
Magnolia tripetala	umbrella magnolia	Magnoliaceae (magnolia family)	
Magnolia virginiana	sweetbay; swamp bay	Magnoliaceae (magnolia family)	
Malpighiaceae: malpighia family
Byrsonima: locustberries
Byrsonima lucida	Long Key locustberry; shiny locustberry	Malpighiaceae (malpighia family)	
Malpighia: malpighia trees
Malpighia glabra	acerola; Barbados cherry; wild crape myrtle	Malpighiaceae (malpighia family)	
Malvaceae: mallow family
Hibiscus: hibiscus trees
Hibiscus mutabilis	Confederate rose; cotton rose	Malvaceae (mallow family)	
Hibiscus syriacus	Syrian hibiscus; Rose-of-Sharon	Malvaceae (mallow family)	
Hibiscus tiliaceus	seaside mahoe; sea hibiscus	Malvaceae (mallow family)	
Lagunaria: lagunaria trees
Lagunaria patersonia	cow itch tree; primrose tree; Norfolk Island hibiscus; pyramid tree	Malvaceae (mallow family)	
Thespesia: thespesia trees
Thespesia populnea	portia tree; milo	Malvaceae (mallow family)	
Melastomataceae: melastome family
Tetrazygia: tetrazygia trees
Tetrazygia bicolor	Florida tetrazygia	Melastomataceae (melastome family)	
Meliaceae: mahogany family
Cedrela: cedrela trees
Cedrela odorata	Spanish cedrela; cedro hembra	Meliaceae (mahogany family)	
Melia: berry mahoganies
Melia azedarach	chinaberry	Meliaceae (mahogany family)	
Swietenia: baywoods
Swietenia macrophylla	American mahogany	Meliaceae (mahogany family)	
Swietenia mahagoni	mahogany	Meliaceae (mahogany family)	
Moraceae: mulberry family
Antiaris: antiaris trees
Antiaris toxicaria	upas; ipoh; dart-poison tree	Moraceae (mulberry family)	
Artocarpus: artocarpus trees
Artocarpus altilis	breadfruit	Moraceae (mulberry family)	
Artocarpus ansiophyllus	entawak	Moraceae (mulberry family)	
Artocarpus heterophyllus	common jackfruit	Moraceae (mulberry family)	
Artocarpus integer	chempedak	Moraceae (mulberry family)	
Artocarpus kemando	pudau	Moraceae (mulberry family)	
Artocarpus lacucha	lakoocha	Moraceae (mulberry family)	
Artocarpus lamellosus	butong	Moraceae (mulberry family)	
Artocarpus odoratissimus	marang	Moraceae (mulberry family)	
Artocarpus parvus	kwai muk	Moraceae (mulberry family)	
Artocarpus rigidus	monkey jackfruit	Moraceae (mulberry family)	
Artocarpus sarawakensis	pingan	Moraceae (mulberry family)	
Artocarpus sericicarpus	pedalai	Moraceae (mulberry family)	
Brosimum: brosimum trees
Brosimum alicastrum	breadnut	Moraceae (mulberry family)	
Brosimum gaudichaudii	mama-cadela	Moraceae (mulberry family)	
Broussonetia: broussonetia trees
Broussonetia luzonica	alakon	Moraceae (mulberry family)	
Broussonetia papyrifera	paper mulberry	Moraceae (mulberry family)	
Cecropia: cecropia trees
Cecropia peltata	trumpet tree; yagrumo hembra	Moraceae (mulberry family)	
Ficus: fig trees
Ficus altissima	council tree	Moraceae (mulberry family)	
Ficus aspera	lofty fig; clown fig	Moraceae (mulberry family)	
Ficus aurea	Florida strangler fig	Moraceae (mulberry family)	
Ficus auriculata	Roxburgh fig	Moraceae (mulberry family)	
Ficus benghalensis	banyan fig; Bengal fig; Indian fig; East Indian fig; Indian banyan	Moraceae (mulberry family)	
Ficus benjamina	weeping fig; Benjamin's fig	Moraceae (mulberry family)	
Ficus callosa	kalukoi	Moraceae (mulberry family)	
Ficus carica	common fig	Moraceae (mulberry family)	
Ficus celebensis	Celebese fig	Moraceae (mulberry family)	
Ficus coronata	creek sandpaper fig	Moraceae (mulberry family)	
Ficus deltoidea	mistletoe fig	Moraceae (mulberry family)	
Ficus elastica	rubber tree; rubber fig	Moraceae (mulberry family)	
Ficus erecta	inu-biwa; Japanese fig	Moraceae (mulberry family)	
Ficus fistulosa	yellow-stem fig	Moraceae (mulberry family)	
Ficus fraseri	shiny sandpaper fig	Moraceae (mulberry family)	
Ficus glomerata	cluster fig	Moraceae (mulberry family)	
Ficus kurzii	thick-rinded fig	Moraceae (mulberry family)	
Ficus laevigata	Jamaican cherry	Moraceae (mulberry family)	
Ficus lutea	kaffir fig	Moraceae (mulberry family)	
Ficus lyrata	fiddle-leaf fig	Moraceae (mulberry family)	
Ficus maclellandii	banana-leaf fig	Moraceae (mulberry family)	
Ficus macrophylla	Moreton Bay fig	Moraceae (mulberry family)	
Ficus mauritiana	Mauritian fig; Maldive fig	Moraceae (mulberry family)	
Ficus microcarpa	Chinese banyan tree; laurel fig; fig laurel	Moraceae (mulberry family)	
Ficus mysorensis	Mysore fig	Moraceae (mulberry family)	
Ficus nekbudu	Zulu fig	Moraceae (mulberry family)	
Ficus neriifolia	narrowleaf fig; willow-leaf fig; oleander-leaf fig	Moraceae (mulberry family)	
Ficus nota	tibig	Moraceae (mulberry family)	
Ficus obliqua	small-leaf fig	Moraceae (mulberry family)	
Ficus petiolaris	rock fig; lava fig	Moraceae (mulberry family)	
Ficus platypoda	desert fig; Australian fig	Moraceae (mulberry family)	
Ficus pseudopalma	Philippine fig	Moraceae (mulberry family)	
Ficus religiosa	sacred fig; bo tree	Moraceae (mulberry family)	
Ficus ribes	walen; gooseberry fig	Moraceae (mulberry family)	
Ficus rubiginosa	Port Jackson fig; little-leaf fig; rusty fig	Moraceae (mulberry family)	
Ficus septica	angular-fruit fig	Moraceae (mulberry family)	
Ficus sycomorus	sycamore fig	Moraceae (mulberry family)	
Ficus triangularis	triangle fig	Moraceae (mulberry family)	
Ficus variegata	variegated weeping fig; cauliflorus fig	Moraceae (mulberry family)	
Ficus virens	white fig	Moraceae (mulberry family)	
Ficus watkinsiana	Australian strangler fig	Moraceae (mulberry family)	
Maclura: cockspur thorns
Maclura cochinchinensis	Chinese cockspur thorn	Moraceae (mulberry family)	
Maclura pomifera	Osage-orange	Moraceae (mulberry family)	
Maclura tricuspidata	cudrang; Mandarin melonberry; silkworm thorn; zhe (che); Chinese mulberry	Moraceae (mulberry family)	
Morus: mulberries
Morus alba	white mulberry	Moraceae (mulberry family)	
Morus australis	Chinese mulberry	Moraceae (mulberry family)	
Morus celtidifolia	Mexican mulberry	Moraceae (mulberry family)	
Morus insignis	Argentine mulberry	Moraceae (mulberry family)	
Morus mesozygia	African mulberry	Moraceae (mulberry family)	
Morus microphylla	Texas mulberry	Moraceae (mulberry family)	
Morus nigra	black mulberry	Moraceae (mulberry family)	
Morus rubra	red mulberry	Moraceae (mulberry family)	
Moringaceae: moringa family
Moringa: moringa trees
Moringa oleifera	horseradish tree; olive moringa; moringa	Moringaceae (moringa family)	
Muntingiaceae: muntingia family
Muntingia: muntingia trees
Muntingia calabura	strawberry tree	Muntingiaceae (strawberry-tree family)	
Myoporaceae: myoporum family
Myoporum: myoporum trees
Myoporum laetum	ngaio; mousehole tree; myoporum	Myoporaceae (myoporum family)	
Myricaceae: bayberry family
Myrica: bayberries
Myrica californica	California bayberry	Myricaceae (bayberry family)	
Myrica cerifera	wax myrtle; southern bayberry	Myricaceae (bayberry family)	
Myrica inodora	odorless bayberry	Myricaceae (bayberry family)	
Myrsinaceae: myrsine family
Ardisia: ardisia trees
Ardisia escallonioides	marlberry; coralberry	Myrsinaceae (myrsine family)	
Myrsine: myrsine trees
Myrsine floridana	Florida myrsine	Myrsinaceae (myrsine family)	
Myrtaceae: myrtle family
Agonis: peppermint myrtles
Agonis flexuosa	Western Australian peppermint; Swan River peppermint; Australian willow myrtle	Myrtaceae (myrtle family)	
Callistemon: callistemon trees
Callistemon viminalis	weeping bottlebrush	Myrtaceae (myrtle family)	
Calyptranthes: mountainbays and lidflowers
Calyptranthes acevedoi	Puerto Rico mountainbay	Myrtaceae (myrtle family)	
Calyptranthes pallens	pale lidflower	Myrtaceae (myrtle family)	
Calyptranthes zuzygium	myrtle-of-the-river	Myrtaceae (myrtle family)	
Corymbia: corymbia trees
Corymbia ficifolia	red-flowering gum	Myrtaceae (myrtle family)	
Eucalyptus: eucalyptus trees
Eucalyptus caesia	silver princess mallee	Myrtaceae (myrtle family)	
Eucalyptus camaldulensis	red river gum	Myrtaceae (myrtle family)	
Eucalyptus cinerea	silver dollar tree	Myrtaceae (myrtle family)	
Eucalyptus citriodora	lemon-scented gum	Myrtaceae (myrtle family)	
Eucalyptus cladocalyx	sugar gum	Myrtaceae (myrtle family)	
Eucalyptus deglupta	Mindanao gum	Myrtaceae (myrtle family)	
Eucalyptus globulus	bluegum eucalyptus	Myrtaceae (myrtle family)	
Eucalyptus grandis	rose gum eucalyptus	Myrtaceae (myrtle family)	
Eucalyptus marginata	jarrah	Myrtaceae (myrtle family)	
Eucalyptus nicholii	willow-leafed peppermint gum	Myrtaceae (myrtle family)	
Eucalyptus polyanthemos	silver dollar gum	Myrtaceae (myrtle family)	
Eucalyptus rhodantha	rose mallee	Myrtaceae (myrtle family)	
Eucalyptus robusta	robust eucalyptus	Myrtaceae (myrtle family)	
Eucalyptus rudis	flooded gum; desert gum	Myrtaceae (myrtle family)	
Eucalyptus saligna	saligna eucalyptus	Myrtaceae (myrtle family)	
Eucalyptus sideroxylon	pink-flowering ironbark	Myrtaceae (myrtle family)	
Eucalyptus spathulata	narrow-leaf gimlet	Myrtaceae (myrtle family)	
Eugenia: eugenia trees
Eugenia axillaris	white stopper	Myrtaceae (myrtle family)	
Eugenia brasiliensis	gumichama	Myrtaceae (myrtle family)	
Eugenia confusa	redberry stopper	Myrtaceae (myrtle family)	
Eugenia foetida	boxleaf stopper	Myrtaceae (myrtle family)	
Eugenia involucrata	cherry of the Rio Grande	Myrtaceae (myrtle family)	
Eugenia luschnathiana	pitomba	Myrtaceae (myrtle family)	
Eugenia pyriformis	uvalha	Myrtaceae (myrtle family)	
Eugenia rhombea	red stopper	Myrtaceae (myrtle family)	
Eugenia sprengelii	littleleaf eugenia; littleaf stopper	Myrtaceae (myrtle family)	
Eugenia stipitata	arazá	Myrtaceae (myrtle family)	
Eugenia uniflora	Surinam cherry; Brazilian cherry; Cayenne cherry; pitanga	Myrtaceae (myrtle family)	
Feijoa: feijoa trees
Feijoa sellowiana	pineapple guava	Myrtaceae (myrtle family)	
Leptospermum: leptospermum trees
Leptospermum laevigatum	Australian tea tree	Myrtaceae (myrtle family)	
Lophostemon: lophostemon trees
Lophostemon confertus	Brisbane box	Myrtaceae (myrtle family)	
Melaleuca: melaleuca trees
Melaleuca linariifolia	flaxleaf paperbark	Myrtaceae (myrtle family)	
Melaleuca nesophila	pink melaleuca	Myrtaceae (myrtle family)	
Melaleuca quinquenervia	cajeput melaleuca	Myrtaceae (myrtle family)	
Metrosideros: ratas and pohutukawa
Metrosideros excelsa	pohutukawa; New Zealand Christmas tree	Myrtaceae (myrtle family)	
Metrosideros polymorpha	Hawaiian bottlebrush; ʻōhiʻa lehua; lehua	Myrtaceae (myrtle family)	
Metrosideros robusta	northern rata	Myrtaceae (myrtle family)	
Metrosideros umbellata	southern rata	Myrtaceae (myrtle family)	
Myrcianthes: myrcianthes trees
Myrcianthes fragrans	twinberry; Simpson's stopper	Myrtaceae (myrtle family)	
Myrtus: myrtles
Myrtus communis	common myrtle	Myrtaceae (myrtle family)	
Psidium: guavas
Psidium friedrichsthalianum	Costa Rica guava; cas guava	Myrtaceae (myrtle family)	
Psidium galapageium	Galapagos guava	Myrtaceae (myrtle family)	
Psidium guajava	apple guava; common guava	Myrtaceae (myrtle family)	
Psidium guineense	Guinea guava	Myrtaceae (myrtle family)	
Psidium havanense	Cuban guava	Myrtaceae (myrtle family)	
Psidium littorale var. cattleianum	strawberry guava; Cattley guava; Peruvian guava; Chinese guava	Myrtaceae (myrtle family)	
Psidium littorale var. littorale	lemon guava	Myrtaceae (myrtle family)	
Psidium longipes	long-stalk stopper; mangroveberry	Myrtaceae (myrtle family)	
Psidium montanum	mountain guava	Myrtaceae (myrtle family)	
Psidium sartorianum	Sartre guava	Myrtaceae (myrtle family)	
Rhodomyrtus: rose myrtles
Rhodomyrtus tomentosa	downy rose myrtle	Myrtaceae (myrtle family)	
Syzygium: lillypillies
Syzygium aromaticum	clove	Myrtaceae (myrtle family)	
Syzygium cumini	jambul; jamun; jamblang	Myrtaceae (myrtle family)	
Syzygium luehmannii	riberry; small-leaved lillypilly; cherry satinash; cherry alder; clove lillypilly	Myrtaceae (myrtle family)	
Syzygium malaccense	Malay apple; mountain apple; jambu bol; plum rose; pommerac	Myrtaceae (myrtle family)	
Syzygium oleosum	blue lilly pilly	Myrtaceae (myrtle family)	
Syzygium paniculatum	magenta lillypilly; magenta cherry; brush cherry	Myrtaceae (myrtle family)	
Syzygium samarangense	wax apple; love apple; Java apple; bellfruit	Myrtaceae (myrtle family)	
Tristaniopsis: water gum trees
Tristaniopsis laurina	Australian water gum	Myrtaceae (myrtle family)	
Nothofagaceae: southern beech family
Nothofagus: southern beeches
Nothofagus antarctica	Antarctic beech; ñire	Nothofagaceae (southern beech family)	
Nothofagus betuloides	Magellan's beech; birch-leaf beech; guindo	Nothofagaceae (southern beech family)	
Nothofagus cunninghamii	myrtle beech	Nothofagaceae (southern beech family)	
Nothofagus dombeyi	coihue; coigue; false beech	Nothofagaceae (southern beech family)	
Nothofagus fusca	red beech	Nothofagaceae (southern beech family)	
Nothofagus menziesii	silver beech	Nothofagaceae (southern beech family)	
Nothofagus moorei	Moore's Antarctic beech	Nothofagaceae (southern beech family)	
Nothofagus nitida	coigüe de Chiloé; Chiloé's coigue	Nothofagaceae (southern beech family)	
Nothofagus obliqua	roble; hualle; coyán	Nothofagaceae (southern beech family)	
Nothofagus pumilio	lenga; lenga beech	Nothofagaceae (southern beech family)	
Nothofagus truncata	hard beech	Nothofagaceae (southern beech family)	
Nyctaginaceae: four o'clock family
Guapira: blollies
Guapira discolor	longleaf blolly; beeftree	Nyctaginaceae (four o'clock family)	
Pisonia: pisonia or mapou trees
Pisonia brunoniana	parapara; birdcatcher tree; pāpala kēpau	Nyctaginaceae (four o'clock family)	
Pisonia grandis	Indian pisonia; catchbird tree; birdcatcher tree	Nyctaginaceae (four o'clock family)	
Pisonia rotundata	smooth devil's claws; Florida pisonia	Nyctaginaceae (four o'clock family)	
Nyssaceae: sourgum family
Nyssa: tupelo trees
Nyssa aquatica	water tupelo	Nyssaceae (sourgum family)	
Nyssa biflora	swamp tupelo; swamp blackgum	Nyssaceae (sourgum family)	
Nyssa ogeche	Ogeechee lime; Ogeechee tupelo	Nyssaceae (sourgum family)	
Nyssa sylvatica	blackgum; black tupelo	Nyssaceae (sourgum family)	
Olacaceae: olax family
Schoepfia: schoepfia trees
Schoepfia chrysophylloides	graytwig; Gulf graytwig	Olacaceae (olax family)	
Oleaceae: olive family
Chionanthus: fringe trees
Chionanthus virginicus	fringe tree	Oleaceae (olive family)	
Forestiera: false privets
Forestiera acuminata	swamp privet	Oleaceae (olive family)	
Forestiera segregata	Florida privet	Oleaceae (olive family)	
Fraxinus: ashes
Fraxinus americana	white ash	Oleaceae (olive family)	
Fraxinus angustifolia	narrow-leaved ash	Oleaceae (olive family)	
Fraxinus caroliniana	Carolina ash	Oleaceae (olive family)	
Fraxinus excelsior	European ash	Oleaceae (olive family)	
Fraxinus latifolia	Oregon ash	Oleaceae (olive family)	
Fraxinus nigra	black ash	Oleaceae (olive family)	
Fraxinus ornus	manna ash; flowering ash	Oleaceae (olive family)	
Fraxinus pennsylvanica	green ash	Oleaceae (olive family)	
Fraxinus profunda	pumpkin ash	Oleaceae (olive family)	
Fraxinus quadrangulata	blue ash	Oleaceae (olive family)	
Fraxinus uhdei	evergreen ash	Oleaceae (olive family)	
Fraxinus velutina	Arizona ash	Oleaceae (olive family)	
Ligustrum: privets
Ligustrum japonicum	Japanese privet	Oleaceae (olive family)	
Ligustrum lucidum	Chinese privet; glossy privet	Oleaceae (olive family)	
Ligustrum ovalifolium	garden privet	Oleaceae (olive family)	
Ligustrum sinense	Chinese privet	Oleaceae (olive family)	
Ligustrum vulgare	wild privet; common privet	Oleaceae (olive family)	
Noronhia: noronhia trees
Noronhia emarginata	Madagascar olive	Oleaceae (olive family)	
Olea: olives
Olea europaea	Mediterranean olive; common olive	Oleaceae (olive family)	
Osmanthus: osmanthus trees
Osmanthus americanus	devilwood; osmanthus	Oleaceae (olive family)	
Osmanthus fragrans	sweet osmanthus	Oleaceae (olive family)	
Syringa: lilacs
Syringa pekinensis	Chinese tree lilac	Oleaceae (olive family)	
Syringa reticulata	Japanese tree lilac	Oleaceae (olive family)	
Syringa vulgaris	common lilac	Oleaceae (olive family)	
Syringa yunanaensis	Yunnan lilac	Oleaceae (olive family)	
Oxalidaceae: wood sorrel family
Averrhoa: averrhoa trees
Averrhoa carambola	carambola; star fruit	Oxalidaceae (wood sorrel family)	
Pandanaceae: screwpine family
Pandanus: pandanus trees
Pandanus utilis	screwpine	Pandanaceae (screwpine family)	
Papaveraceae: poppy family
Bocconia:
Bocconia frutescens	tree poppy	Papaveraceae (poppy family)	
Dendromecon:
Dendromecon harfordii	Channel Islands tree poppy	Papaveraceae (poppy family)	
Dendromecon rigida	bush poppy	Papaveraceae (poppy family)	
Phyllanthaceae: gooseberry tree family
Bischofia: bischofia trees
Bischofia javanica	bishopwood; toog tree	Phyllanthaceae (gooseberry tree family)	
Phyllanthus: gooseberry trees
Phyllanthus acidus	star gooseberry; Tahitian gooseberry tree; Malay gooseberry	Phyllanthaceae (gooseberry tree family)	
Phyllanthus emblica	Indian gooseberry tree	Phyllanthaceae (gooseberry tree family)	
Phyllanthus niruri	chanca piedra	Phyllanthaceae (gooseberry tree family)	
Pittosporaceae: pittosporum family
Pittosporum: pittosporums
Pittosporum rhombifolium	Queensland pittosporum; diamond pittosporum	Pittosporaceae (pittosporum family)	
Pittosporum tobira	tobira	Pittosporaceae (pittosporum family)	
Pittosporum tenuifolium	kohuhu	Pittosporaceae (pittosporum family)	
Platanaceae: plane family
Platanus: planes
Platanus × hispanica	London plane	Platanaceae (plane family)	
Platanus occidentalis	American sycamore; American plane	Platanaceae (plane family)	
Platanus orientalis	Oriental plane	Platanaceae (plane family)	
Platanus racemosa	California sycamore; California plane	Platanaceae (plane family)	
Platanus wrightii	Arizona sycamore; Arizona plane	Platanaceae (plane family)	
Poaceae: grass family
Dendrocalamus: giant clumping bamboos
Dendrocalamus asper	giant bamboo; edible bamboo	Poaceae (grass family)	
Polygonaceae: knotweed family
Coccoloba: coccoloba trees
Coccoloba diversifolia	pigeon plum	Polygonaceae (knotweed family)	
Coccoloba uvifera	seagrape	Polygonaceae (knotweed family)	
Proteaceae: protea family
Alloxylon: alloxylon trees
Alloxylon flammeum	satin oak	Proteaceae (protea family)	
Banksia: banksia trees
Banksia ashbyi	Ashby's banksia	Proteaceae (protea family)	
Banksia integrifolia	coast banksia	Proteaceae (protea family)	
Banksia seminuda	river banksia	Proteaceae (protea family)	
Dryandra: dryandras
Dryandra proteoides	king dryandra	Proteaceae (protea family)	
Embothrium: firebushes
Embothrium coccineum	Chilean firebush	Proteaceae (protea family)	
Grevillea: grevillea trees
Grevillea robusta	silky-oak; Australian silver oak	Proteaceae (protea family)	
Hakea: hakea proteas
Hakea laurina	pincushion bush; pincushion tree	Proteaceae (protea family)	
Leucadendron: leucadendrons
Leucadendron argenteum	silverleaf; silvertree	Proteaceae (protea family)	
Leucadendron laureolum	golden conebush	Proteaceae (protea family)	
Leucospermum: leucospermum trees
Leucospermum conocarpodendron	pincushion	Proteaceae (protea family)	
Macadamia: macadamia nut trees
Macadamia integrifolia	smooth-shelled macadamia	Proteaceae (protea family)	
Macadamia ternifolia	small-fruited macadamia	Proteaceae (protea family)	
Macadamia tetraphylla	rough-shelled macadamia	Proteaceae (protea family)	
Mimetes: pagoda bushes
Mimetes cucullatus	common pagoda bush	Proteaceae (protea family)	
Persoonia: geebungs
Persoonia levis	smooth geebung; broad-leaved geebung	Proteaceae (protea family)	
Persoonia linearis	narrow-leaved geebung; geebung pine	Proteaceae (protea family)	
Protea: protea trees and shrubs
Protea afra	common protea	Proteaceae (protea family)	
Protea cynaroides	king protea	Proteaceae (protea family)	
Protea repens	common sugarbush; sugarbush protea	Proteaceae (protea family)	
Stenocarpus: stenocarpus trees
Stenocarpus sinuatus	firewheel tree	Proteaceae (protea family)	
Telopea: telopea trees
Telopea speciosissima	waratah	Proteaceae (protea family)	
Punicaceae: pomegranate family
Punica: punica trees
Punica granatum	pomegranate	Punicaceae (pomegranate family)	
Rhamnaceae: buckthorn family
Colubrina: nakedwoods
Colubrina arborescens	greenheart; coffee colubrina	Rhamnaceae (buckthorn family)	
Colubrina asiatica	Asian nakedwood	Rhamnaceae (buckthorn family)	
Colubrina cubensis	Cuban nakedwood	Rhamnaceae (buckthorn family)	
Colubrina elliptica	soldierwood	Rhamnaceae (buckthorn family)	
Frangula: buckthorns
Frangula alnus	alder buckthorn	Rhamnaceae (buckthorn family)	
Frangula purshiana	cascara buckthorn	Rhamnaceae (buckthorn family)	
Krugiodendron: krugiodendrons
Krugiodendron ferreum	leadwood; black ironwood	Rhamnaceae (buckthorn family)	
Reynosia: reynosia trees
Reynosia septentrionalis	darling plum; red ironwood	Rhamnaceae (buckthorn family)	
Rhamnus: buckthorns
Rhamnus caroliniana	Carolina buckthorn; polecat tree	Rhamnaceae (buckthorn family)	
Rhamnus cathartica	common buckthorn; European buckthorn	Rhamnaceae (buckthorn family)	
Rhamnus lanceolata	lance-leaf buckthorn	Rhamnaceae (buckthorn family)	
Ziziphus: ziziphus trees
Ziziphus jujuba	jujube	Rhamnaceae (buckthorn family)	
Rhizophoraceae: mangrove family
Rhizophora: true mangroves
Rhizophora apiculata	bakau minyak	Rhizophoraceae (mangrove family)	
Rhizophora mangle	red mangrove	Rhizophoraceae (mangrove family)	
Rosaceae: rose family
Amelanchier: serviceberries (juneberries or shadbushes)
Amelanchier alnifolia	saskatoon	Rosaceae (rose family)	
Amelanchier amabilis	lovely shadbush	Rosaceae (rose family)	
Amelanchier arborea	downy serviceberry	Rosaceae (rose family)	
Amelanchier asiatica	Asian serviceberry	Rosaceae (rose family)	
Amelanchier bartramiana	mountain serviceberry; alpine serviceberry	Rosaceae (rose family)	
Amelanchier canadensis	eastern serviceberry; shadblow serviceberry	Rosaceae (rose family)	
Amelanchier florida	Pacific serviceberry	Rosaceae (rose family)	
Amelanchier humilis	low shadbush	Rosaceae (rose family)	
Amelanchier interior	Wiegand's serviceberry	Rosaceae (rose family)	
Amelanchier laevis	smooth serviceberry; Allegheny serviceberry	Rosaceae (rose family)	
Amelanchier lamarckii	snowy mespilus; juneberry	Rosaceae (rose family)	
Amelanchier ovalis	snowy mespilus	Rosaceae (rose family)	
Amelanchier sanguinea	roundleaf serviceberry; red-twigged serviceberry	Rosaceae (rose family)	
Amelanchier sinica	Chinese serviceberry	Rosaceae (rose family)	
Amelanchier spicata	thicket serviceberry; dwarf serviceberry	Rosaceae (rose family)	
Amelanchier utahensis	Utah serviceberry	Rosaceae (rose family)	
Aronia: chokeberries
Aronia arbutifolia	red chokeberry	Rosaceae (rose family)	
Aronia melanocarpa	black chokeberry	Rosaceae (rose family)	
Chaenomeles: flowering quinces
Chaenomeles cathayensis	Chinese flowering quince	Rosaceae (rose family)	
Chaenomeles japonica	Japanese flowering quince	Rosaceae (rose family)	
Chaenomeles speciosa	common flowering quince	Rosaceae (rose family)	
Cotoneaster: cotoneasters
Cotoneaster frigidus	tree cotoneaster	Rosaceae (rose family)	
Crataegus: hawthorns
Crataegus aestivalis	may haw; may hawthorn	Rosaceae (rose family)	
Crataegus calpodendron	pear hawthorn	Rosaceae (rose family)	
Crataegus × canescens	Stern's medlar	Rosaceae (rose family)	
Crataegus chrysocarpa	fireberry hawthorn	Rosaceae (rose family)	
Crataegus coccinea	scarlet hawthorn	Rosaceae (rose family)	
Crataegus columbiana	Columbia hawthorn	Rosaceae (rose family)	
Crataegus crus-galli	cockspur hawthorn	Rosaceae (rose family)	
Crataegus douglasii	black hawthorn; Douglas hawthorn	Rosaceae (rose family)	
Crataegus flabellata	fanleaf hawthorn	Rosaceae (rose family)	
Crataegus flava	southern hawthorn; yellow hawthorn	Rosaceae (rose family)	
Crataegus germanica	common medlar	Rosaceae (rose family)	
Crataegus laevigata	Midland hawthorn	Rosaceae (rose family)	
Crataegus marshallii	parsley hawthorn	Rosaceae (rose family)	
Crataegus mollis	downy hawthorn	Rosaceae (rose family)	
Crataegus monogyna	common hawthorn	Rosaceae (rose family)	
Crataegus phaenopyrum	Washington hawthorn	Rosaceae (rose family)	
Crataegus punctata	dotted hawthorn; whitehaw	Rosaceae (rose family)	
Crataegus spathulata	spatulate hawthorn	Rosaceae (rose family)	
Crataegus succulenta	succulent hawthorn; fleshy hawthorn	Rosaceae (rose family)	
Crataegus uniflora	single-flower hawthorn; dwarf hawthorn	Rosaceae (rose family)	
Cydonia: Mediterranean quince
Cydonia oblonga	quince	Rosaceae (rose family)	
Eriobotrya: loquats
Eriobotrya deflexa	bronze loquat	Rosaceae (rose family)	
Eriobotrya japonica	Japanese loquat	Rosaceae (rose family)	
Lyonothamnus: lyonothamnus trees
Lyonothamnus floribundus	Catalina ironwood	Rosaceae (rose family)	
Malus: apples and crabapples
Malus angustifolia	southern crabapple	Rosaceae (rose family)	
Malus baccata	Siberian crabapple	Rosaceae (rose family)	
Malus coronaria	sweet crabapple	Rosaceae (rose family)	
Malus domestica	orchard apple	Rosaceae (rose family)	
Malus floribunda	Japanese flowering crabapple	Rosaceae (rose family)	
Malus fusca	Oregon crabapple; Pacific crabapple	Rosaceae (rose family)	
Malus ioensis	prairie crabapple	Rosaceae (rose family)	
Malus sieversii	Asian wild apple	Rosaceae (rose family)	
Malus sylvestris	European wild apple	Rosaceae (rose family)	
Photinia: photinias
Photinia × fraseri	red tip photinia; red tip	Rosaceae (rose family)	
Photinia davidiana	stranvaesia photinia; David's photinia	Rosaceae (rose family)	
Photinia glabra	Japanese photinia	Rosaceae (rose family)	
Photinia serrulata	Chinese photinia	Rosaceae (rose family)	
Prunus: cherries, plums, peaches, apricots, almonds and cherry laurels
Prunus alleghaniensis	Allegheny plum	Rosaceae (rose family)	
Prunus americana	American plum	Rosaceae (rose family)	
Prunus amygdalus	almond	Rosaceae (rose family)	
Prunus andersonii	desert peach	Rosaceae (rose family)	
Prunus angustifolia	Chickasaw plum	Rosaceae (rose family)	
Prunus armeniaca	apricot	Rosaceae (rose family)	
Prunus avium	wild cherry; orchard cherry	Rosaceae (rose family)	
Prunus capollin	capulin	Rosaceae (rose family)	
Prunus caroliniana	Carolina cherry laurel	Rosaceae (rose family)	
Prunus cerasifera	cherry plum	Rosaceae (rose family)	
Prunus cerasus	sour cherry	Rosaceae (rose family)	
Prunus domestica	garden plum	Rosaceae (rose family)	
Prunus emarginata	bitter cherry	Rosaceae (rose family)	
Prunus fasciculata	desert almond	Rosaceae (rose family)	
Prunus fremontii	desert apricot	Rosaceae (rose family)	
Prunus hortulana	prairie plum; hortulana plum	Rosaceae (rose family)	
Prunus ilicifolia	holly-leaved cherry	Rosaceae (rose family)	
Prunus insititia	damson; bullace	Rosaceae (rose family)	
Prunus laurocerasus	common cherry laurel	Rosaceae (rose family)	
Prunus lusitanica	Portuguese cherry laurel	Rosaceae (rose family)	
Prunus lyonii	Catalina cherry	Rosaceae (rose family)	
Prunus maackii	Amur chokecherry	Rosaceae (rose family)	
Prunus mahaleb	St Lucie cherry	Rosaceae (rose family)	
Prunus maritima	beach plum	Rosaceae (rose family)	
Prunus mexicana	Mexican plum	Rosaceae (rose family)	
Prunus mume	Chinese plum; Japanese apricot	Rosaceae (rose family)	
Prunus munsoniana	wild goose plum	Rosaceae (rose family)	
Prunus myrtifolia	myrtle-leaved cherry laurel	Rosaceae (rose family)	
Prunus nigra	Canada plum	Rosaceae (rose family)	
Prunus padus	bird cherry	Rosaceae (rose family)	
Prunus pensylvanica	pin cherry; fire cherry	Rosaceae (rose family)	
Prunus persica	peach	Rosaceae (rose family)	
Prunus pumila	sand cherry	Rosaceae (rose family)	
Prunus salicifolia	willow-leaf cherry	Rosaceae (rose family)	
Prunus serotina	black cherry	Rosaceae (rose family)	
Prunus serrulata	Japanese cherry	Rosaceae (rose family)	
Prunus spinosa	blackthorn; sloe	Rosaceae (rose family)	
Prunus subcordata	sierra plum	Rosaceae (rose family)	
Prunus subhirtella	autumn cherry	Rosaceae (rose family)	
Prunus umbellata	flatwoods plum; hog plum	Rosaceae (rose family)	
Prunus virginiana	chokecherry	Rosaceae (rose family)	
Pseudocydonia: Oriental quinces
Pseudocydonia sinensis	Chinese quince	Rosaceae (rose family)	
Pyracantha: firethorns
Pyracantha coccinea	scarlet firethorn	Rosaceae (rose family)	
Pyrus: pears
Pyrus calleryana	Callery pear; Bradford pear	Rosaceae (rose family)	
Pyrus communis	common pear	Rosaceae (rose family)	
Pyrus cordata	Plymouth pear	Rosaceae (rose family)	
Pyrus cossonii	Algerian pear	Rosaceae (rose family)	
Pyrus elaeagrifolia	oleaster-leaf pear	Rosaceae (rose family)	
Pyrus kawakamii	Kawakam pear; Kawakam evergreen pear	Rosaceae (rose family)	
Pyrus koehnei	Koehne pear; Koehne evergreen pear	Rosaceae (rose family)	
Pyrus nivalis	snow pear	Rosaceae (rose family)	
Pyrus pashia	Afghan pear	Rosaceae (rose family)	
Pyrus pyrifolia	sand pear; Asian pear; nashi pear	Rosaceae (rose family)	
Pyrus salicifolia	willow-leaf pear; weeping pear	Rosaceae (rose family)	
Pyrus ussuriensis	Siberian pear; Chinese fragrant pear	Rosaceae (rose family)	
Rhaphiolepis: rhaphiolepis trees
Rhaphiolepis indica	Indian hawthorn	Rosaceae (rose family)	
Sorbus: rowans, service-trees, and whitebeams
Sorbus americana	American mountain ash; American rowan	Rosaceae (rose family)	
Sorbus aria	whitebeam	Rosaceae (rose family)	
Sorbus aucuparia	European rowan	Rosaceae (rose family)	
Sorbus cashmiriana	Kashmir rowan	Rosaceae (rose family)	
Sorbus decora	showy rowan	Rosaceae (rose family)	
Sorbus domestica	true service tree	Rosaceae (rose family)	
Sorbus intermedia	Swedish whitebeam	Rosaceae (rose family)	
Sorbus sitchensis	Sitka mountain ash; Pacific mountain ash	Rosaceae (rose family)	
Sorbus torminalis	wild service tree	Rosaceae (rose family)	
Spiraea: spirea trees and shrubs
Spiraea nipponica	Nippon spiraea; snowmound	Rosaceae (rose family)	
Rubiaceae: madder family
Blepharidium: blepharidium
Blepharidium guatemalense		Rubiaceae (madder family)	
Casasia: casasia trees
Casasia clusiifolia	seven-year apple	Rubiaceae (madder family)	
Cephalanthus: cephalanthus trees
Cephalanthus occidentalis	button bush	Rubiaceae (madder family)	
Chione:
Chione venosa		Rubiaceae (madder family)	
Cinchona: cinchona trees
Cinchona pubescens	quinine tree	Rubiaceae (madder family)	
Coffea: coffee trees
Coffea arabica	coffee; Ethiopian coffee	Rubiaceae (madder family)	
Exostema: exostema trees
Exostema caribaeum	princewood; Caribbean princewood	Rubiaceae (madder family)	
Guettarda: velvetseeds
Guettarda elliptica	oval-leaf velvetseed	Rubiaceae (madder family)	
Guettarda scabra	rough-leaf velvetseed	Rubiaceae (madder family)	
Hamelia: hamelia bushes
Hamelia patens	firebush; hummingbird bush	Rubiaceae (madder family)	
Morinda: morindas or false mulberry trees
Morinda citrifolia	Tahitian noni; great morinda; Indian mulberry; beach mulberry	Rubiaceae (madder family)	
Pinckneya: pinckneya trees
Pinckneya pubens	pinckneya; fevertree; feverbark tree	Rubiaceae (madder family)	
Simira:
Simira salvadorensis		Rubiaceae (madder family)	
Rutaceae: citrus family
Calodendrum: calodendrum trees
Calodendrum capense	Cape chestnut	Rutaceae (citrus family)	
Citrus: oranges, lemons, limes, grapefruits, and kumquats
Citrus aurantiifolia	lime	Rutaceae (citrus family)	
Citrus aurantium	sour orange	Rutaceae (citrus family)	
Citrus grandis	shaddock; pumelo	Rutaceae (citrus family)	
Citrus japonica	kumquat	Rutaceae (citrus family)	
Citrus limon	lemon	Rutaceae (citrus family)	
Citrus medica	citron	Rutaceae (citrus family)	
Citrus paradisi	grapefruit	Rutaceae (citrus family)	
Citrus reticulata	mandarin	Rutaceae (citrus family)	
Citrus sinensis	sweet orange	Rutaceae (citrus family)	
Poncirus: astringent oranges
Poncirus trifoliata	trifoliate orange	Rutaceae (citrus family)	
Ptelea: ptelea trees
Ptelea trifoliata	hop tree	Rutaceae (citrus family)	
Zanthoxylum: prickly-ashes
Zanthoxylum americanum	American prickly-ash	Rutaceae (citrus family)	
Zanthoxylum clava-herculis	Hercules' club	Rutaceae (citrus family)	
Zanthoxylum coriaceum	Biscayne prickly-ash	Rutaceae (citrus family)	
Zanthoxylum fagara	wild-lime prickly-ash	Rutaceae (citrus family)	
Zanthoxylum flavum	satinwood	Rutaceae (citrus family)	
Zanthoxylum martinicense	white prickly-ash; espino rubial; pino macho	Rutaceae (citrus family)	
Salicaceae: willow family
Populus: poplars, cottonwoods, and aspens
Populus × acuminata	lanceleaf cottonwood	Salicaceae (willow family)	
Populus × canadensis	hybrid black poplar	Salicaceae (willow family)	
Populus alba	white poplar	Salicaceae (willow family)	
Populus angustifolia	narrowleaf cottonwood	Salicaceae (willow family)	
Populus balsamifera	balsam poplar	Salicaceae (willow family)	
Populus candicans	balm of Gilead	Salicaceae (willow family)	
Populus × canescens	grey poplar	Salicaceae (willow family)	
Populus deltoides	eastern cottonwood	Salicaceae (willow family)	
Populus deltoides monilifera	plains cottonwood	Salicaceae (willow family)	
Populus grandidentata	bigtooth aspen	Salicaceae (willow family)	
Populus heterophylla	swamp cottonwood	Salicaceae (willow family)	
Populus nigra	black poplar	Salicaceae (willow family)	
Populus simonii	Simon's poplar	Salicaceae (willow family)	
Populus tremula	European aspen	Salicaceae (willow family)	
Populus tremuloides	quaking aspen	Salicaceae (willow family)	
Populus trichocarpa	black cottonwood; western balsam poplar	Salicaceae (willow family)	
Salix: willows
Salix × sepulcralis 'Chrysocoma'	golden weeping willow	Salicaceae (willow family)	
Salix alaxensis	feltleaf willow	Salicaceae (willow family)	
Salix alba	white willow	Salicaceae (willow family)	
Salix amygdaloides	peachleaf willow; almondleaf willow	Salicaceae (willow family)	
Salix arbusculoides	littletree willow	Salicaceae (willow family)	
Salix aurita	eared willow	Salicaceae (willow family)	
Salix babylonica	Chinese weeping willow	Salicaceae (willow family)	
Salix bebbiana	Bebb's willow	Salicaceae (willow family)	
Salix caprea	goat willow	Salicaceae (willow family)	
Salix caroliniana	coastal plain willow; Carolina willow	Salicaceae (willow family)	
Salix cinerea	grey willow	Salicaceae (willow family)	
Salix daphnoides	violet willow	Salicaceae (willow family)	
Salix discolor	pussy willow	Salicaceae (willow family)	
Salix eriocephala	heartleaf willow	Salicaceae (willow family)	
Salix exigua	sandbar willow	Salicaceae (willow family)	
Salix floridana	Florida willow	Salicaceae (willow family)	
Salix fragilis	crack willow	Salicaceae (willow family)	
Salix glaucophylloides	dune willow; broadleaf willow	Salicaceae (willow family)	
Salix hookeriana	Hooker willow; coast willow	Salicaceae (willow family)	
Salix lasiandra	Pacific willow; western black willow; yellow willow; whiplash willow	Salicaceae (willow family)	
Salix lasiolepis	arroyo willow	Salicaceae (willow family)	
Salix lucida	glossy willow; shiny willow	Salicaceae (willow family)	
Salix monticola	mountain willow	Salicaceae (willow family)	
Salix nigra	black willow	Salicaceae (willow family)	
Salix pellita	satiny willow	Salicaceae (willow family)	
Salix pentandra	bay willow	Salicaceae (willow family)	
Salix petiolaris	meadow willow	Salicaceae (willow family)	
Salix prolixa	Mackenzie willow	Salicaceae (willow family)	
Salix purpurea	purple willow	Salicaceae (willow family)	
Salix pyrifolia	balsam willow	Salicaceae (willow family)	
Salix scouleriana	Scouler's willow; fire willow; mountain willow	Salicaceae (willow family)	
Salix sericea	silky willow; satin willow	Salicaceae (willow family)	
Salix sitchensis	Sitka willow	Salicaceae (willow family)	
Salix viminalis	osier	Salicaceae (willow family)	
Sapindaceae: soapberry family
Cupania: toadwoods
Cupania glabra	Florida toadwood	Sapindaceae (soapberry family)	
Cupaniopsis: cupaniopsis trees
Cupaniopsis anacardioides	tuckeroo	Sapindaceae (soapberry family)	
Dodonaea: dodonaea trees
Dodonaea viscosa	varnish leaf	Sapindaceae (soapberry family)	
Exothea: exothea trees
Exothea paniculata	butterbough; inkwood	Sapindaceae (soapberry family)	
Hypelate: hypelate shrubs
Hypelate trifoliata	white ironwood	Sapindaceae (soapberry family)	
Koelreuteria: koelreuteria trees
Koelreuteria bipinnata	Chinese flame tree	Sapindaceae (soapberry family)	
Koelreuteria paniculata	goldenrain tree	Sapindaceae (soapberry family)	
Litchi: litchi trees
Litchi chinensis	litchi; lychee	Sapindaceae (soapberry family)	
Sapindus: soapberries
Sapindus drummondii	western soapberry	Sapindaceae (soapberry family)	
Sapindus marginatus	Florida soapberry	Sapindaceae (soapberry family)	
Sapindus saponaria	wingleaf soapberry	Sapindaceae (soapberry family)	
Sapotaceae: sapodilla family
Bumelia: bumelias
Bumelia celastrina	saffron plum bumelia	Sapotaceae (sapodilla family)	
Bumelia lanuginosa	gum bumelia	Sapotaceae (sapodilla family)	
Bumelia lycioides	buckthorn bumelia	Sapotaceae (sapodilla family)	
Bumelia tenax	tough bumelia	Sapotaceae (sapodilla family)	
Chrysophyllum: chrysophyllum fruit trees
Chrysophyllum cainito	star apple	Sapotaceae (sapodilla family)	
Chrysophyllum oliviforme	satinleaf	Sapotaceae (sapodilla family)	
Dipholis: bustics
Dipholis salicifolia	willow bustic	Sapotaceae (sapodilla family)	
Manilkara: manilkara trees
Manilkara bahamensis	wild dilly	Sapotaceae (sapodilla family)	
Manilkara bidentata	ausubo; balata	Sapotaceae (sapodilla family)	
Manilkara zapota	sapodilla	Sapotaceae (sapodilla family)	
Mastichodendron: mastichodendron trees
Mastichodendron foetidissimum	mastic	Sapotaceae (sapodilla family)	
Simaroubaceae: quassia family
Ailanthus: ailanthus trees
Ailanthus altissima	tree of heaven; ailanthus	Simaroubaceae (quassia family)	
Alvaradoa: alvaradoas
Alvaradoa amorphoides	Mexican alvaradoa	Simaroubaceae (quassia family)	
Picramnia: picramnia trees
Picramnia pentandra	bitterbush	Simaroubaceae (quassia family)	
Simarouba: simarouba trees
Simarouba glauca	paradise tree; bitterwood	Simaroubaceae (quassia family)	
Solanaceae: nightshade family
Nicotiana: tobacco
Nicotiana glauca	tree tobacco	Solanaceae (nightshade family)	
Solanum: nightshades and potatoes
Solanum erianthum	potato tree; mullein nightshade	Solanaceae (nightshade family)	
Staphyleaceae: bladdernut family
Staphylea: bladdernuts
Staphylea trifolia	American bladdernut	Staphyleaceae (bladdernut family)	
Sterculiaceae: sterculia family
Brachychiton: bottle trees
Brachychiton populneus × acerifolius	flame tree	Sterculiaceae (sterculia family)	
Brachychiton rupestris	Queensland bottle tree	Sterculiaceae (sterculia family)	
Cola: cola trees
Cola acuminata	cola nut tree; kola tree	Sterculiaceae (sterculia family)	
Dombeya: dombeya trees
Dombeya rotundifolia	South African wild pear	Sterculiaceae (sterculia family)	
Dombeya wallichii	pink-ball; tropical hydrangea	Sterculiaceae (sterculia family)	
Firmiana: parasol trees
Firmiana simplex	Chinese parasol tree	Sterculiaceae (sterculia family)	
Theobroma: cacao trees
Theobroma cacao	cacao; cacahuatl; kakaw	Sterculiaceae (sterculia family)	
Strelitziaceae: bird-of-paradise family
Ravenala: ravenala trees
Ravenala madagascariensis	traveler's tree	Strelitziaceae (bird-of-paradise family)	
Strelitzia: strelitzia trees
Strelitzia nicolai	giant bird-of-paradise	Strelitziaceae (bird-of-paradise family)	
Styracaceae: storax family
Halesia: silverbells
Halesia carolina	Carolina silverbell	Styracaceae (storax family)	
Halesia diptera	two-winged silverbell; double-winged silverbell	Styracaceae (storax family)	
Halesia tetraptera	four-winged silverbell; quadruple-winged silverbell	Styracaceae (storax family)	
Styrax: storaxes and snowbells
Styrax americanus	storax; American snowbell	Styracaceae (storax family)	
Styrax grandifolius	bigleaf snowbell	Styracaceae (storax family)	
Surianaceae: bay cedar family
Suriana: suriana trees
Suriana maritima	baycedar	Surianaceae (baycedar family)	
Symplocaceae: sweetleaf family
Symplocos: sweetleaves
Symplocos tinctoria	sweetleaf; horse sugar	Symplocaceae (sweetleaf family)	
Tamaricaceae: tamarisk family
Tamarix: tamarisk trees
Tamarix africana	African tamarisk	Tamaricaceae (tamarisk family)	
Tamarix gallica	tamarisk	Tamaricaceae (tamarisk family)	
Tamarix parviflora	American tamarisk; tamarisk	Tamaricaceae (tamarisk family)	
Theaceae: tea family
Camellia: camellias
Camellia japonica	Japanese camellia	Theaceae (tea family)	
Camellia sinensis	tea camellia; tea plant	Theaceae (tea family)	
Franklinia: franklinia shrubs
Franklinia alatamaba	Franklinia	Theaceae (tea family)	
Gordonia: gordonia shrubs
Gordonia lasianthus	loblolly bay; red bay	Theaceae (tea family)	
Stewartia: stewartia shrubs
Stewartia malacodendron	Virginia stewartia; silky stewartia; silky camellia	Theaceae (tea family)	
Stewartia ovata	mountain stewartia	Theaceae (tea family)	
Stewartia pseudocamellia	Japanese stewartia; deciduous camellia	Theaceae (tea family)	
Theophrastaceae: theophrasta family
Jacquinia: jacquinia trees
Jacquinia keyensis	joewood	Theophrastaceae (theophrasta family)	
Thymelaeaceae: mezereum family
Daphne: daphnes
Daphne laureola	spurge-laurel	Thymelaeaceae (mezereum family)	
Daphne mezereum	mezereon	Thymelaeaceae (mezereum family)	
Tiliaceae: lime family
Tilia: limes, basswoods
Tilia americana	American basswood	Tiliaceae (basswood family)	
Tilia caroliniana	Carolina basswood	Tiliaceae (basswood family)	
Tilia cordata	small-leaved lime	Tiliaceae (basswood family)	
Tilia × europaea	common lime	Tiliaceae (basswood family)	
Tilia heterophylla	white basswood	Tiliaceae (basswood family)	
Tilia mongolica	Mongolian lime	Tiliaceae (basswood family)	
Tilia platyphyllos	large-leaved lime	Tiliaceae (basswood family)	
Tilia tomentosa	silver lime	Tiliaceae (basswood family)	
Ulmaceae: elm family
Planera: planera trees
Planera aquatica	water elm; planertree	Ulmaceae (elm family)	
Ulmus: elms
Ulmus alata	winged elm; wahoo	Ulmaceae (elm family)	
Ulmus americana	American elm; white elm	Ulmaceae (elm family)	
Ulmus bergmanniana	Bergmann's elm	Ulmaceae (elm family)	
Ulmus canescens	grey elm; grey-leafed elm; hoary elm	Ulmaceae (elm family)	
Ulmus castaneifolia	chestnut-leafed elm	Ulmaceae (elm family)	
Ulmus chenmoui	chenmou elm	Ulmaceae (elm family)	
Ulmus crassifolia	cedar elm	Ulmaceae (elm family)	
Ulmus davidiana	David's elm; Father David's elm	Ulmaceae (elm family)	
Ulmus davidiana var. japonica	Japanese elm; Wilson's elm	Ulmaceae (elm family)	
Ulmus gaussenii	Anhui elm	Ulmaceae (elm family)	
Ulmus glabra	wych elm	Ulmaceae (elm family)	
Ulmus glaucescens	Gansu elm	Ulmaceae (elm family)	
Ulmus harbinensis	Harbin elm; Harbinese elm	Ulmaceae (elm family)	
Ulmus laciniata	Manchurian elm; cut-leaf elm	Ulmaceae (elm family)	
Ulmus laciniata var. nikkoensis	Nikko elm	Ulmaceae (elm family)	
Ulmus laevis	European white elm; fluttering elm	Ulmaceae (elm family)	
Ulmus lamellosa	Hebei elm	Ulmaceae (elm family)	
Ulmus macrocarpa	large-fruited elm	Ulmaceae (elm family)	
Ulmus mexicana	Mexican elm	Ulmaceae (elm family)	
Ulmus minor subsp. angustifolia	Cornish elm	Ulmaceae (elm family)	
Ulmus minor subsp. minor	field elm; smooth-leaved elm; narrow-leaved elm	Ulmaceae (elm family)	
Ulmus minor subsp. sarniensis	Guernsey elm; Jersey elm; Southampton elm; Wheatley elm	Ulmaceae (elm family)	
Ulmus minor var. plotii	Plot's elm; Goodyer's elm; Lock elm	Ulmaceae (elm family)	
Ulmus parvifolia	Chinese elm; lacebark elm	Ulmaceae (elm family)	
Ulmus parvifolia var. coreana	Korean lacebark elm	Ulmaceae (elm family)	
Ulmus procera	English elm; Atinian elm	Ulmaceae (elm family)	
Ulmus pumila	Siberian elm	Ulmaceae (elm family)	
Ulmus rubra	slippery elm; red elm	Ulmaceae (elm family)	
Ulmus serotina	September elm	Ulmaceae (elm family)	
Ulmus szechuanica	Szechuan elm	Ulmaceae (elm family)	
Ulmus thomasii	rock elm; cork elm	Ulmaceae (elm family)	
Ulmus uyematsui	Arishan elm	Ulmaceae (elm family)	
Ulmus villosa	cherry bark elm	Ulmaceae (elm family)	
Ulmus wallichiana	Himalayan elm; Kashmir elm	Ulmaceae (elm family)	
Zelkova: zelkovas
Zelkova carpinifolia	Caucasian zelkova	Ulmaceae (elm family)	
Zelkova serrata	keaki; Japanese zelkova	Ulmaceae (elm family)	
Verbenaceae: verbena family
Avicennia: avicennia trees
Avicennia germinans	black mangrove	Verbenaceae (verbena family)	
Citharexylum: fiddlewoods
Citharexylum caudatum	juniper berry	Verbenaceae (verbena family)	
Citharexylum fruticosum	Florida fiddlewood	Verbenaceae (verbena family)	
Citharexylum spinosum	spiny fiddlewood	Verbenaceae (verbena family)	
Duranta: durantas
Duranta erecta	golden dewdrop; pigeon berry; skyflower	Verbenaceae (verbena family)	
Duranta erecta variegata	variegated skyflower; pigeon berry	Verbenaceae (verbena family)	
Vitex: chaste trees
Vitex agnus-castus	chaste tree	Verbenaceae (verbena family)	

== See also ==
- List of tree genera
