= Inkwood =

Inkwood, ink wood, or inkwood tree may refer to the following plant species:

- Exothea paniculata
- Hypelate trifoliata
