= Exothea =

Scientific classification
- Kingdom: Plantae
- Clade: Tracheophytes
- Clade: Angiosperms
- Clade: Eudicots
- Clade: Rosids
- Order: Sapindales
- Family: Sapindaceae
- Subfamily: Dodonaeoideae
- Genus: Exothea; Macfad.

Genus of flowering plants

Exothea is a genus of flowering plants belonging to the family Sapindaceae.

Its native range is Southern Florida to Central America, Caribbean.

Species:

- Exothea copalillo (Schltdl.) Radlk.
- Exothea diphylla (Standl.) Lundell
- Exothea paniculata (Juss.) Radlk.
