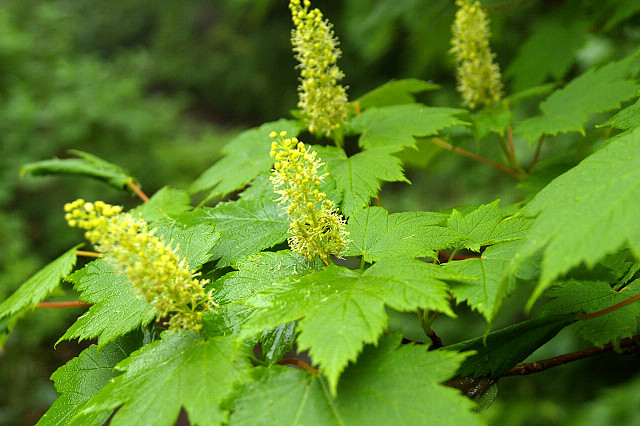

Conservation status
- Least Concern (IUCN 3.1)

Scientific classification
- Kingdom: Plantae
- Clade: Tracheophytes
- Clade: Angiosperms
- Clade: Eudicots
- Clade: Rosids
- Order: Sapindales
- Family: Sapindaceae
- Genus: Acer
- Section: Acer sect. Spicata
- Species: A. caudatum

Binomial name
- Acer caudatum Wall. 1831 not G. Nicholson 1881

Synonyms
- Acer papilio King; Acer erosum Pax; Acer multiserratum Maxim.; Acer ukurunduense Trautv. & C.A.Mey.

= Acer caudatum =

Species of maple

Acer caudatum, commonly known as candle-shape maple, is an Asian species of maple trees. It is found in the Himalayas (Tibet, Nepal, northern and northeastern India, Myanmar) the mountains of southwestern China (Gansu, Henan, Hubei, Ningxia, Shaanxi, Sichuan, Yunnan), plus Japan, Korea, and eastern Russia.

Acer caudatum is a deciduous tree up to 10 meters tall. Leaves are up to 12 cm across, thin and papery, dark green on the top, lighter green on the underside, usually with 5 lobes but occasionally 7.

Varieties

- Acer caudatum subsp. caudatum
- Acer caudatum subsp. multiserratum (Maxim.) A.E.Murray
- Acer caudatum subsp. ukurundense (Trautv. & C.A.Mey.) E.Murray
