= Exothea paniculata =

Conservation status
- Least Concern (IUCN 3.1)

Scientific classification
- Kingdom: Plantae
- Clade: Tracheophytes
- Clade: Angiosperms
- Clade: Eudicots
- Clade: Rosids
- Order: Sapindales
- Family: Sapindaceae
- Genus: Exothea
- Species: E. paniculata

Binomial name
- Exothea paniculata (Juss.) Radlk.

Synonyms
- List: Exothea oblongifolia Macfad.; Hypelate oblongifolia (Macfad.) Hook.; Hypelate paniculata (Juss.) Cambess.; Hypelate trifoliata Griseb.; Melicoccus paniculata Juss.; Sapindus lucidus Desv.; Stadtmannia paniculata (Juss.) D.Dietr.

Species of plant

Exothea paniculata, called the butterbough, inkwood, or ironwood, is a species of flowering plant in the family Sapindaceae. It is native to wet tropical areas of Florida, Mexico, Central America, the Caribbean, and Colombia. A shrub or tree reaching 45 ft (14 m), it is typically found in hammocks.
