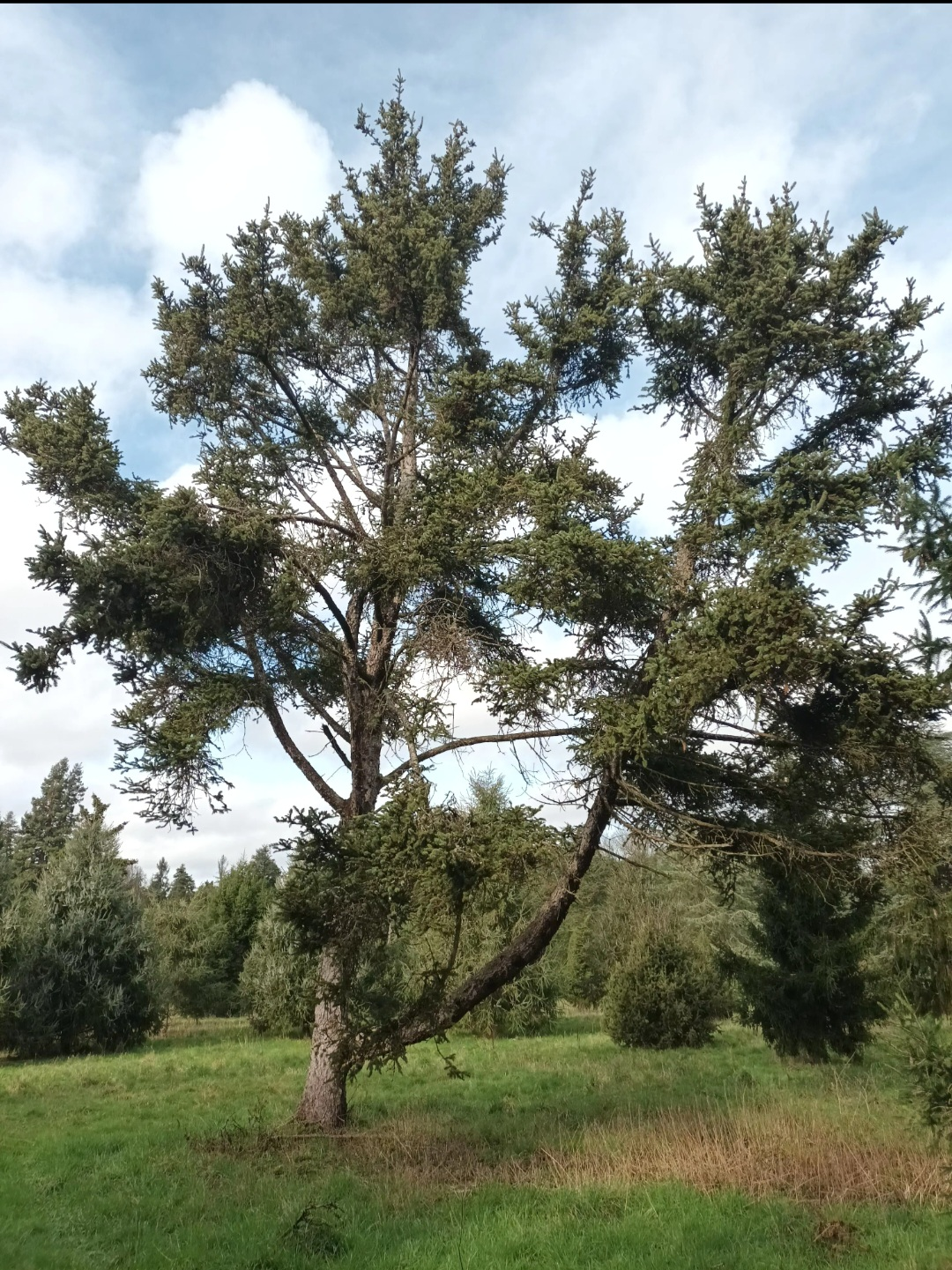

Conservation status
- Endangered (IUCN 3.1)

Scientific classification
- Kingdom: Plantae
- Clade: Embryophytes
- Clade: Tracheophytes
- Clade: Spermatophytes
- Clade: Gymnosperms
- Division: Pinophyta
- Class: Pinopsida
- Order: Pinales
- Family: Pinaceae
- Genus: Picea
- Species: P. aurantiaca

Binomial name
- Picea aurantiaca Mast.

Synonyms
- Picea asperata var. aurantiaca (Mast.) Boom

= Picea aurantiaca =

Species of conifer

Picea aurantiaca is a species of conifer in the pine family, Pinaceae. It is endemic to China, where it is only known from western Sichuan. Its common name is orange spruce. The tree is generally 30-40 meters tall with leaves that are dark green on the top and have white lines present on the underside. the mature branchlets appear an orange-brown color which is likely where the tree's common name is derived. This species is closely related to Picea asperata and it is sometimes treated as a variety.

== Habitat ==
This tree grows on steep mountain slopes on the edges of forests. It grows in a cold subalpine climate up to about 3800 to 4000 meters in maximum elevation. orange spruce can grow in the range of -5C to -6C but has been shown to respond optimally when the coldest quarter is at 0 °C on average The tree is often found near large deposits of limestone with calcareous soil. It can be found alongside Picea likiangensis var. rubescens, Abies squamata, Larix potaninii, and birches.

=== Habitat modeling ===
most of the suitable habitat for orange spruce is in a patch on the southeastern corner of the Tibetan plateau. Research done using maximum entropy habitat modeling based on climate change modeling from Coupled Model Intercomparison Project 6 suggests the suitable habitat for orange spruce is expected to move westward covering a larger portion of the plateau in the next 20-70 years. It is hypothesized that an increase in unstable temperatures in some of the current range of orange spruce will be harmful to the growth of many spruce species. This could result in the species migrating to the new potential areas of habitat.

== Conservation and threats ==
orange spruce has historically been threatened by logging for commercial and domestic use where it is often not distinguished from the more abundant species Picea asperata.

in 2014 the Chinese Comprehensive Commercial Logging Ban in All Natural Forests began being implemented in some regions of China. In January 2017 this legislation achieved a full ban of logging in the natural forests of China.

This tree has been exported and does exist cultivated in some botanical gardens and arboretums in Europe. At these locations it's noted as growing particularly well on chalky substrate.
