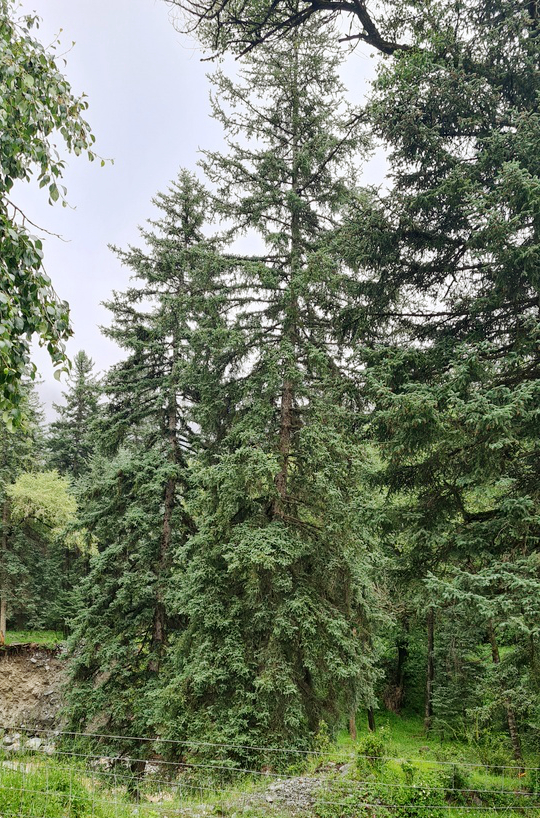
- Picea crassifolia in Qinghai, China

Conservation status
- Least Concern (IUCN 3.1)

Scientific classification
- Kingdom: Plantae
- Clade: Embryophytes
- Clade: Tracheophytes
- Clade: Spermatophytes
- Clade: Gymnosperms
- Division: Pinophyta
- Class: Pinopsida
- Order: Pinales
- Family: Pinaceae
- Genus: Picea
- Species: P. crassifolia

Binomial name
- Picea crassifolia Kom.

= Picea crassifolia =

Species of conifer

Picea crassifolia, the Qinghai spruce, is a species of conifer in the family Pinaceae. It is found only in northwestern China, in the provinces of Qinghai, Gansu, and Inner Mongolia. It is an evergreen tree growing to 20–25 metres tall, with glaucous grey-green needles 12–22 mm long (but up to 35 mm in some cultivated plants) with a rhombic cross-section, not flattened. The cones are 5–11 cm long, with rounded scales. It is closely related to Picea schrenkiana which replaces it further west, and to Picea asperata to its south.
