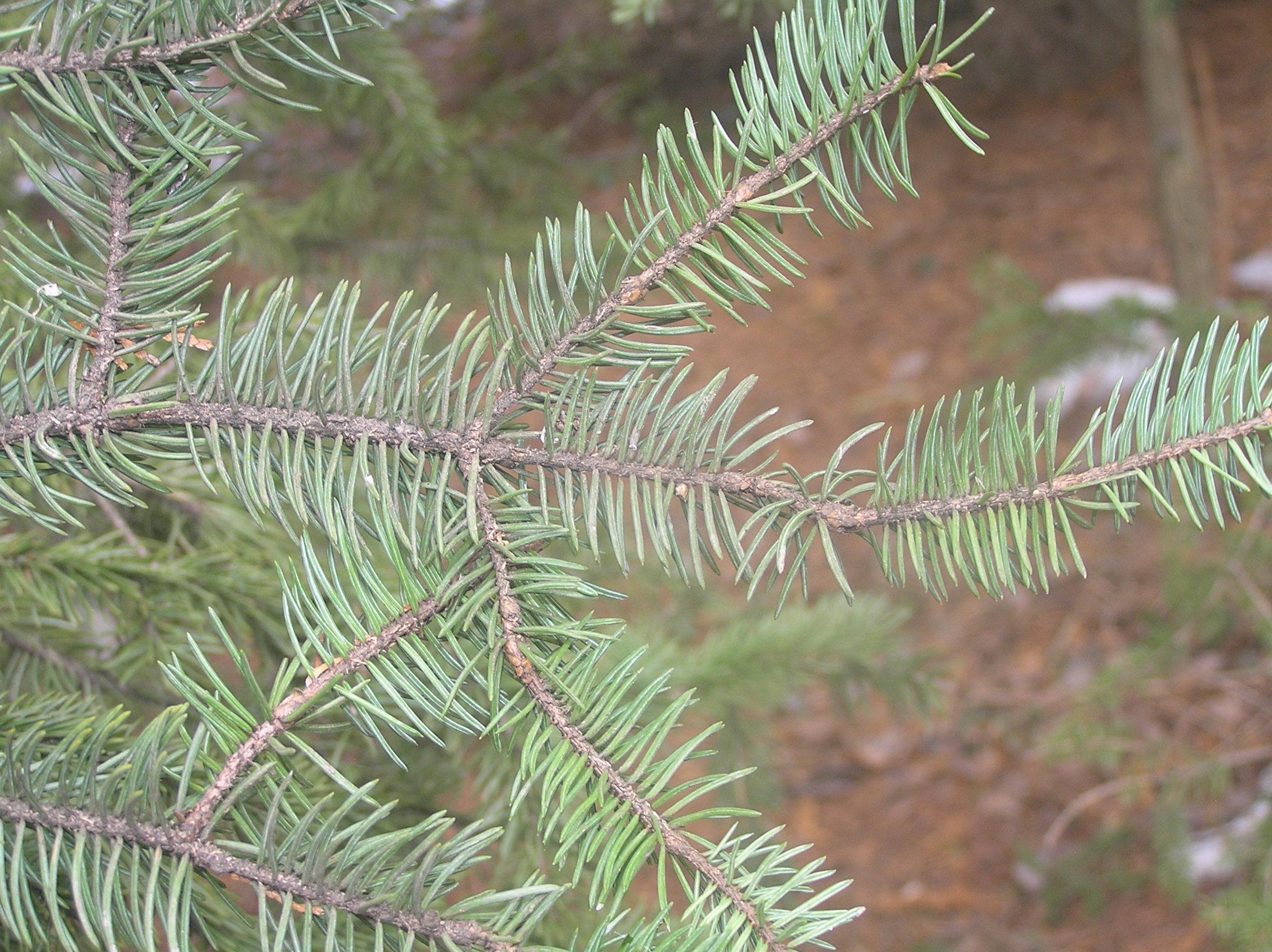

Conservation status
- Near Threatened (IUCN 3.1)

Scientific classification
- Kingdom: Plantae
- Clade: Tracheophytes
- Clade: Gymnospermae
- Division: Pinophyta
- Class: Pinopsida
- Order: Pinales
- Family: Pinaceae
- Genus: Picea
- Species: P. meyeri

Binomial name
- Picea meyeri Rehder & E.H.Wilson

= Picea meyeri =

Species of conifer

Picea meyeri (Meyer's spruce; Chinese: 白杄; pinyin: báiqiān) is a species of spruce native to Nei Mongol in the northeast to Gansu in the southwest and also inhabiting Shanxi, Hebei and Shaanxi.

It is a medium-sized evergreen tree growing to 30 m tall, and with a trunk diameter of up to 0.8 m. The shoots are yellowish-brown, glabrous or with scattered pubescence. The leaves are needle-like, 13–25 mm long, rhombic in cross-section, bluish-green with conspicuous stomatal lines. The cones are cylindric, 7–11 cm long and 3 cm broad, maturing pale brown 5–7 months after pollination, and have stiff, smoothly rounded scales.

It is closely related to Picea asperata from western China.

It is occasionally planted as an ornamental tree; its popularity is increasing in the eastern United States, where it is being used to replace blue spruce, which is more disease-prone in the humid climate there. The wood is similar to that of other spruces, but the species is too rare to be of economic value.
