= Picea austropanlanica =

Scientific classification
- Kingdom: Plantae
- Clade: Tracheophytes
- Clade: Gymnospermae
- Division: Pinophyta
- Class: Pinopsida
- Order: Pinales
- Family: Pinaceae
- Genus: Picea
- Species: P. austropanlanica

Binomial name
- Picea austropanlanica Silba

Possible species of conifer

Picea austropanlanica is a possible species of coniferous tree in the spruce genus Picea of the family Pinaceae. The name was first published by the American gymnosperm specialist, John Silba, in 1999. Its natural distribution is said to be Sichuan, China.

Although as of April 2025, the species is accepted by Plants of the World Online and the World Flora Online, the Gymnosperm Database does not accept Picea austropanlanica. It states that Silba is "mainly noted for describing a huge number of taxa that have been reduced to synonymy with previously known species". Silba's description was based on herbarium specimens only. The type specimen was identified by the collector, E. H. Wilson, as Picea purpurea. Picea austropanlanica may be a synonym of this species. The online Flora of China does not include Picea austropanlanica in its list of Picea species.
