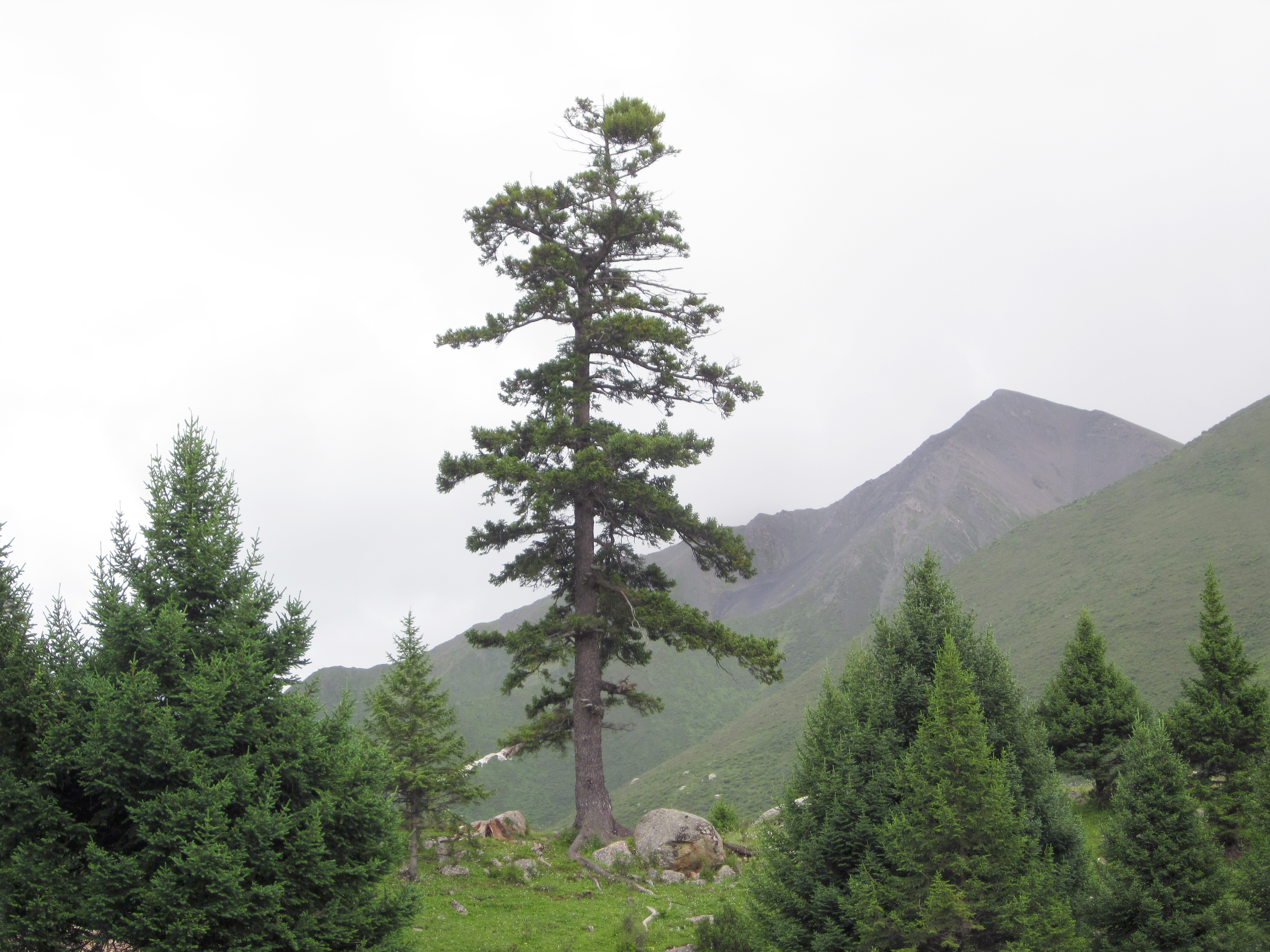

Conservation status
- Near Threatened (IUCN 3.1)

Scientific classification
- Kingdom: Plantae
- Clade: Embryophytes
- Clade: Tracheophytes
- Clade: Gymnosperms
- Division: Pinophyta
- Class: Pinopsida
- Order: Pinales
- Family: Pinaceae
- Genus: Picea
- Species: P. purpurea

Binomial name
- Picea purpurea Mast.

Synonyms
- Homotypic Synonyms: Picea likiangensis var. purpurea (Mast.) Dallim. & A.B.Jacks.; Heterotypic Synonyms: Picea purpurea subsp. purdomii Silba

= Picea purpurea =

Species of conifer

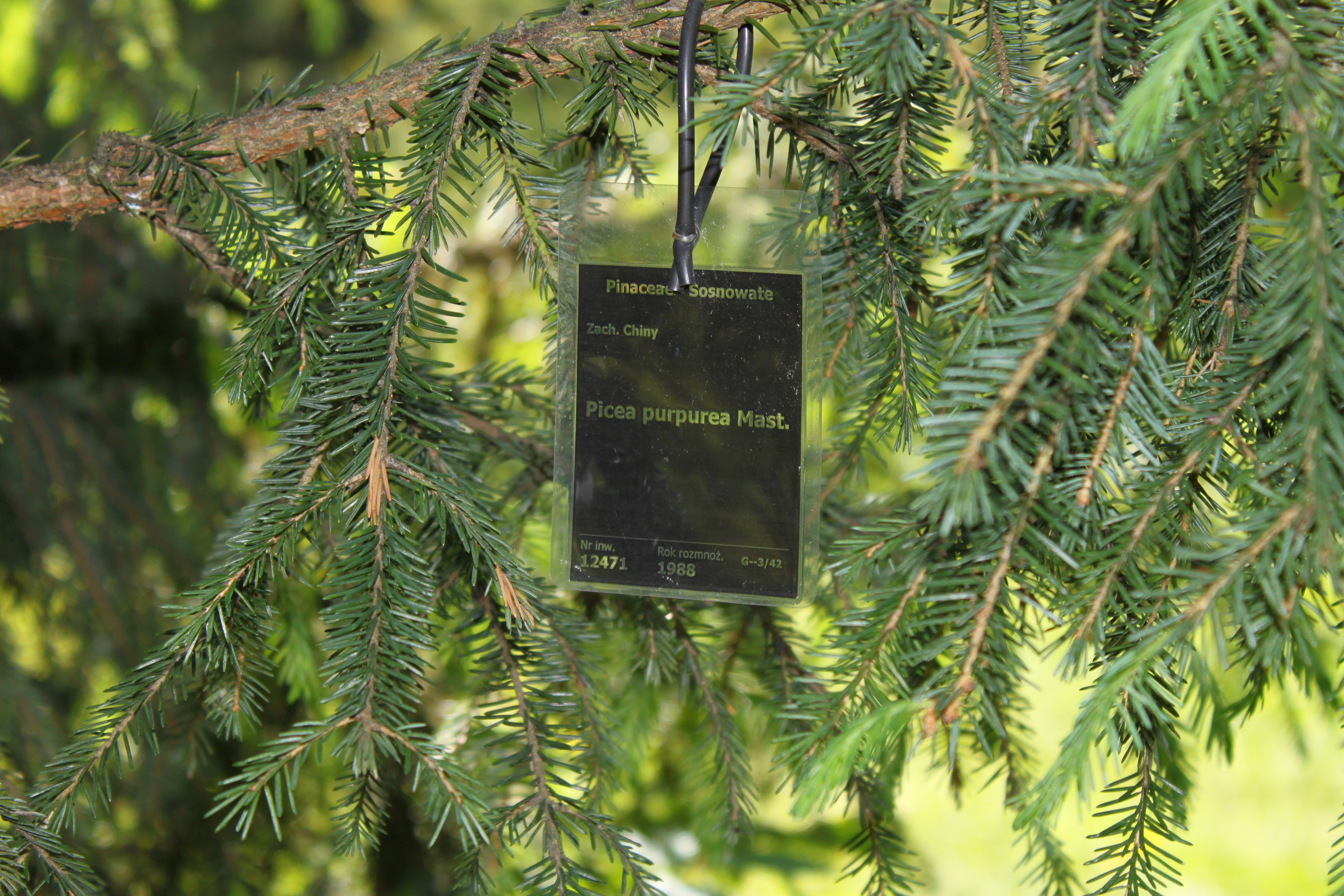
Detail

Picea purpurea, also known as purple cone spruce and purple-coned spruce, is a species of spruce in the family Pinaceae. It is found only in China. It is likely to be a hybrid species produced by crosses between Picea likiangensis and Picea wilsonii, or possibly involving other species.
