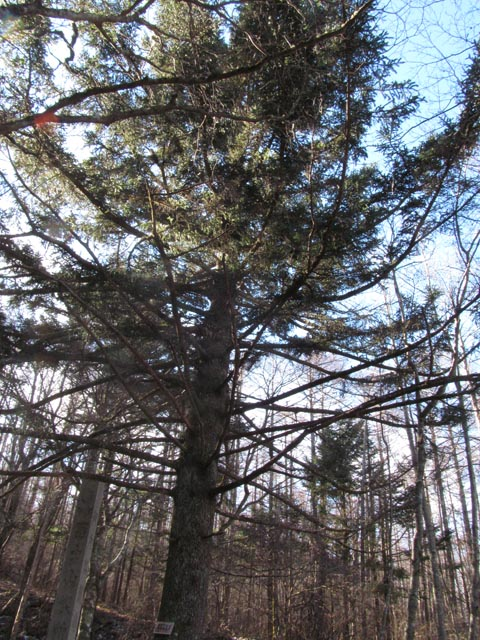

Conservation status
- Near Threatened (IUCN 3.1)

Scientific classification
- Kingdom: Plantae
- Clade: Tracheophytes
- Clade: Gymnospermae
- Division: Pinophyta
- Class: Pinopsida
- Order: Pinales
- Family: Pinaceae
- Genus: Picea
- Species: P. alcoquiana

Binomial name
- Picea alcoquiana Veitch ex Lindl. carriére

= Picea alcoquiana =

Species of conifer

Picea alcoquiana is a species of conifer in the family Pinaceae. It is native only to Japan.
