= Picea retroflexa =

Tapao Shan spruce

Conservation status
- Endangered (IUCN 3.1)

Scientific classification
- Kingdom: Plantae
- Clade: Tracheophytes
- Clade: Gymnospermae
- Division: Pinophyta
- Class: Pinopsida
- Order: Pinales
- Family: Pinaceae
- Genus: Picea
- Species: P. retroflexa

Binomial name
- Picea retroflexa Mast.

Synonyms
- Homotypic Synonyms: Picea asperata var. retroflexa (Mast.) W.C.Cheng; Picea aurantiaca var. retroflexa (Mast.) C.T.Kuan & L.J.Zhou; Heterotypic Synonyms: Picea gemmata Rehder & E.H.Wilson

Species of conifer

Picea retroflexa, the Tapao Shan spruce, is a species of conifer in the family Pinaceae. It is endemic to China, growing in West Sichuan, Kangding, Jiuzhaigou (Zheduo Shan), Qinghai, and Ban Ma Xian. Its limited habitat is threatened by habitat loss due to logging, fires, and grazing.
