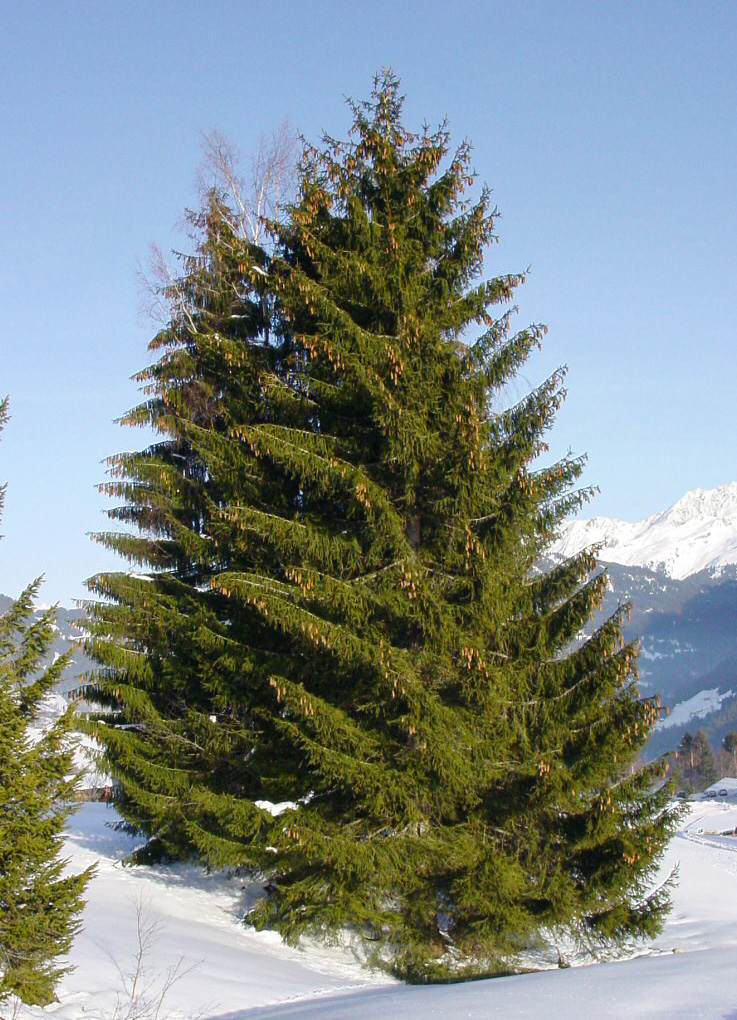
- Picea abies, Norway spruce

Scientific classification
- Kingdom: Plantae
- Clade: Tracheophytes
- Clade: Gymnosperms
- Division: Pinophyta
- Class: Pinopsida
- Order: Pinales
- Family: Pinaceae
- Subfamily: Piceoideae; Frankis
- Genus: Picea; Dietrich

Type species
- Picea abies (L.) H. Karst.

Species
- About 37; see text.

Synonyms
- Veitchia Lindley

= Spruce =

Spruce Temporal range: Valanginian–Recent

Genus of coniferous evergreen trees

A spruce is a tree of the genus Picea, a genus of some 37 species of coniferous trees in the pine family, Pinaceae, found in the northern temperate and boreal (taiga) regions of the Northern Hemisphere. Picea is treated either in the subfamily Pinoideae, or the sole genus in its own subfamily Piceoideae.

Spruces can be distinguished from other genera of the family Pinaceae by their needles (leaves), which are four-sided and attached singly to small persistent peg-like structures (pulvini) on the twigs. The needles are shed when 4–10 years old, leaving the twigs rough with the retained pegs. Pests of spruce forestry include green spruce aphid, eastern spruce budworm, European spruce bark beetle, and great spruce bark beetle.

Spruce is a major producer of timber for construction, and of pulp for paper. It is the standard material for the soundboards of stringed instruments like acoustic guitars. Native Americans use the roots of some species for weaving baskets. The Norway spruce is widely used for Christmas trees. Artists including Augustin Hirschvogel in the 16th century, Edvard Munch around 1900, and Eija-Liisa Ahtila in the 21st century have depicted spruces in etchings, oil paintings, and video installations.

== Etymology ==
The scientific name derives from Latin "pix", pitch, which was obtained from the resin of Picea abies. Spruce, from Middle English spruse or Sprws appears originally to have denoted goods, including wooden objects, imported from Prussia. The Middle English word is in turn from Old French Pruce, "Prussia".

== Description ==
Spruces differ from other Pinaceae in two distinctive characters. Firstly, they have a pulvinus (plural, pulvini), a small peg-like structure at the base of each needle, that remains when the needle falls. Secondly, they have evergreen needle-like leaves that are more or less square in cross-section. The needles stay on the tree for between four and ten years.

The tree usually has a straight trunk, though can become bushy or irregular if damaged by wind exposure or biotic factors like browsing or insect damage. Spruces are resinous, and monoecious, with separate male and female cones on the same tree. Young trees have a conical crown; in older trees, this tends to become a roughly cylindrical column; mature heights vary from 10–20 m in the smaller species like Picea mariana, up to a maximum of 100 m in Picea sitchensis. Branches grow from the trunk in regular whorls; the lower branches are mostly soon lost, except when the tree is open-grown in full sun. Young branches rise above the horizontal, but older branches do not. The needles range from 0.6–0.8 cm in Picea orientalis up to 3.5–5 cm in Picea smithiana. The cones have leaflike bracts that appear at the time of pollination, but unlike Abies (fir cones), these are generally later covered by the seed scales. When mature, the cones range from 2–3.5 cm in Picea mariana, up to 10–20 cm in Picea abies, and nearly as long but stouter and heavier, in Picea smithiana. Each seed sits with its lower half in a cup on the seed scale; the seeds have a large wing.

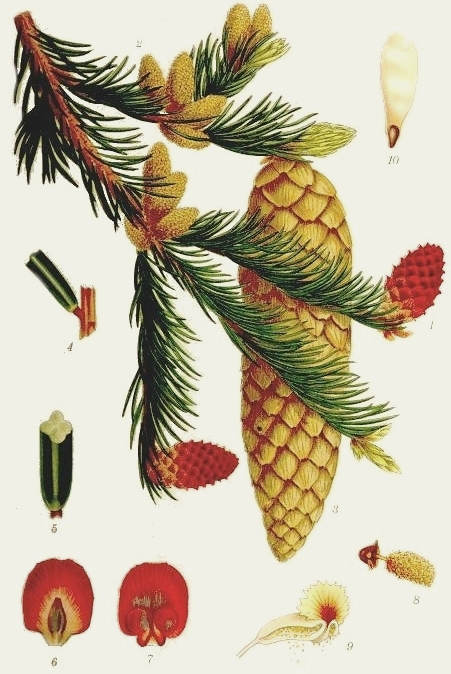
Picea abies anatomy. 1: young female cone; 2: male cones; 3: mature female cone; 4: pulvinus at leaf base; 5: squarish cross-section of leaf; 6: top of scale; 7: underside of scale; 10: winged seed

The structure of the cone scales, including length, width, immature colour, shape of the apex, and how much of the scale is free, is the most useful feature for identifying species of spruce. While Picea glauca and Picea engelmannii, for example, differ in shoot and needle characteristics, those with cones present are most easily identified.

Spruces are generally of moderate lifespan, ranging from 100 to 600 years; the oldest reported age for a single tree is 852 years for a specimen of Picea engelmannii. Clonal reproduction can extend this; a Norway spruce P. abies clonal group in Dalarna, Sweden, nicknamed "Old Tjikko" has reproduced by layering, reaching a claimed age of 9,550 years for the clone as a whole, though not for the small trees that are part of it.

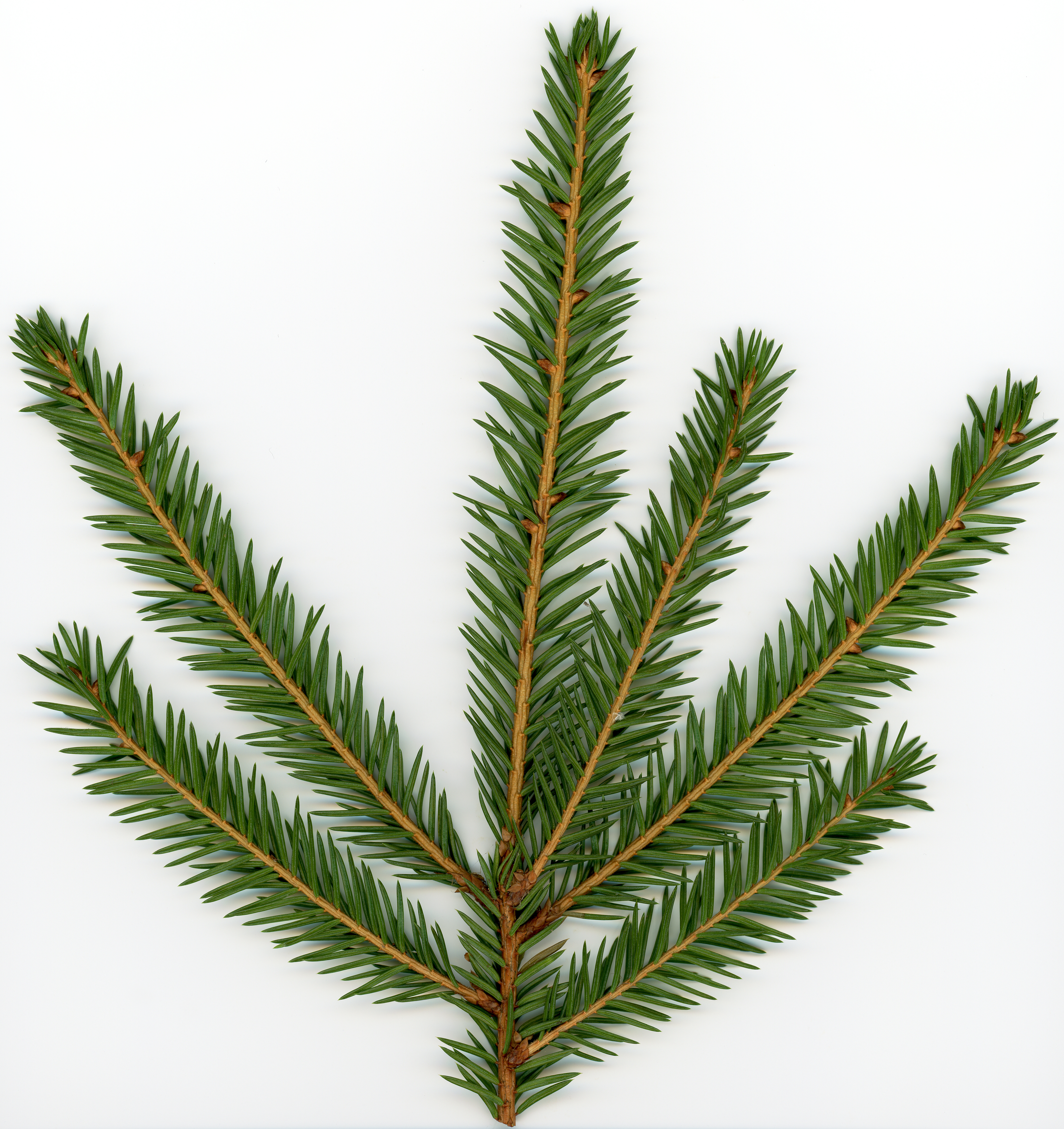
Leaf arrangement. Picea abies

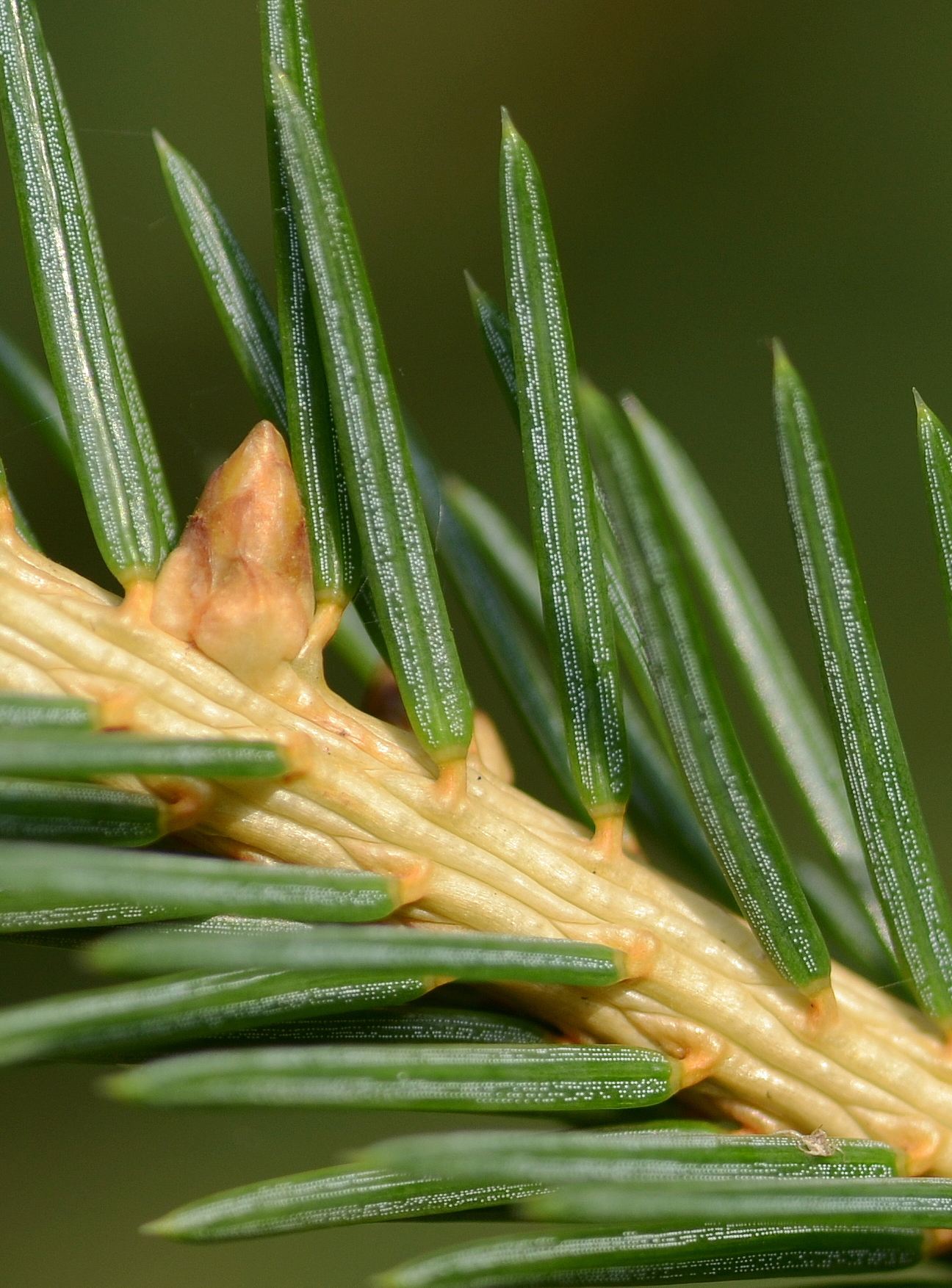
The squarish needle has a peg-like base, the pulvinus. Picea abies

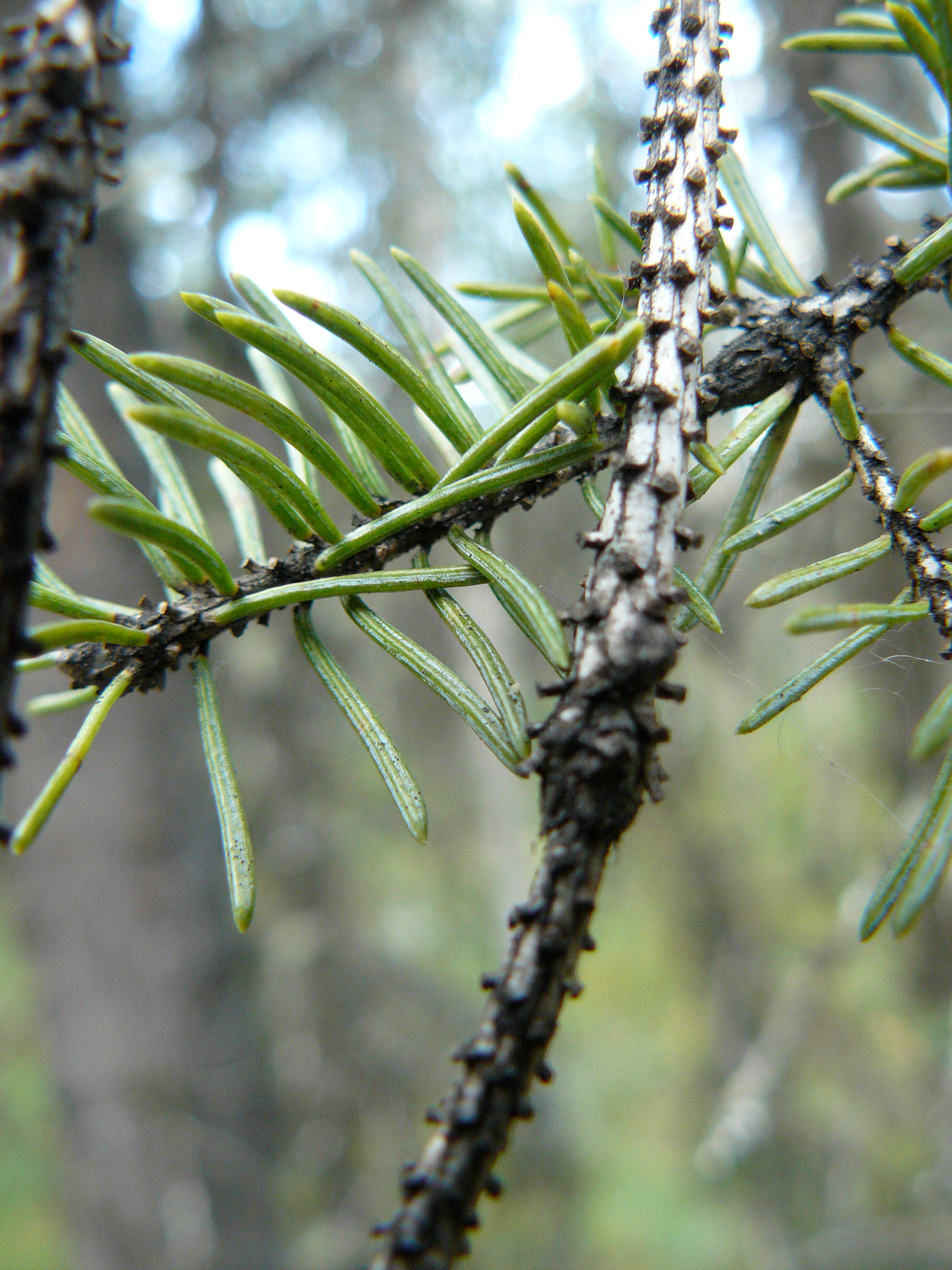
Pulvini remain after the needles fall. Picea glauca

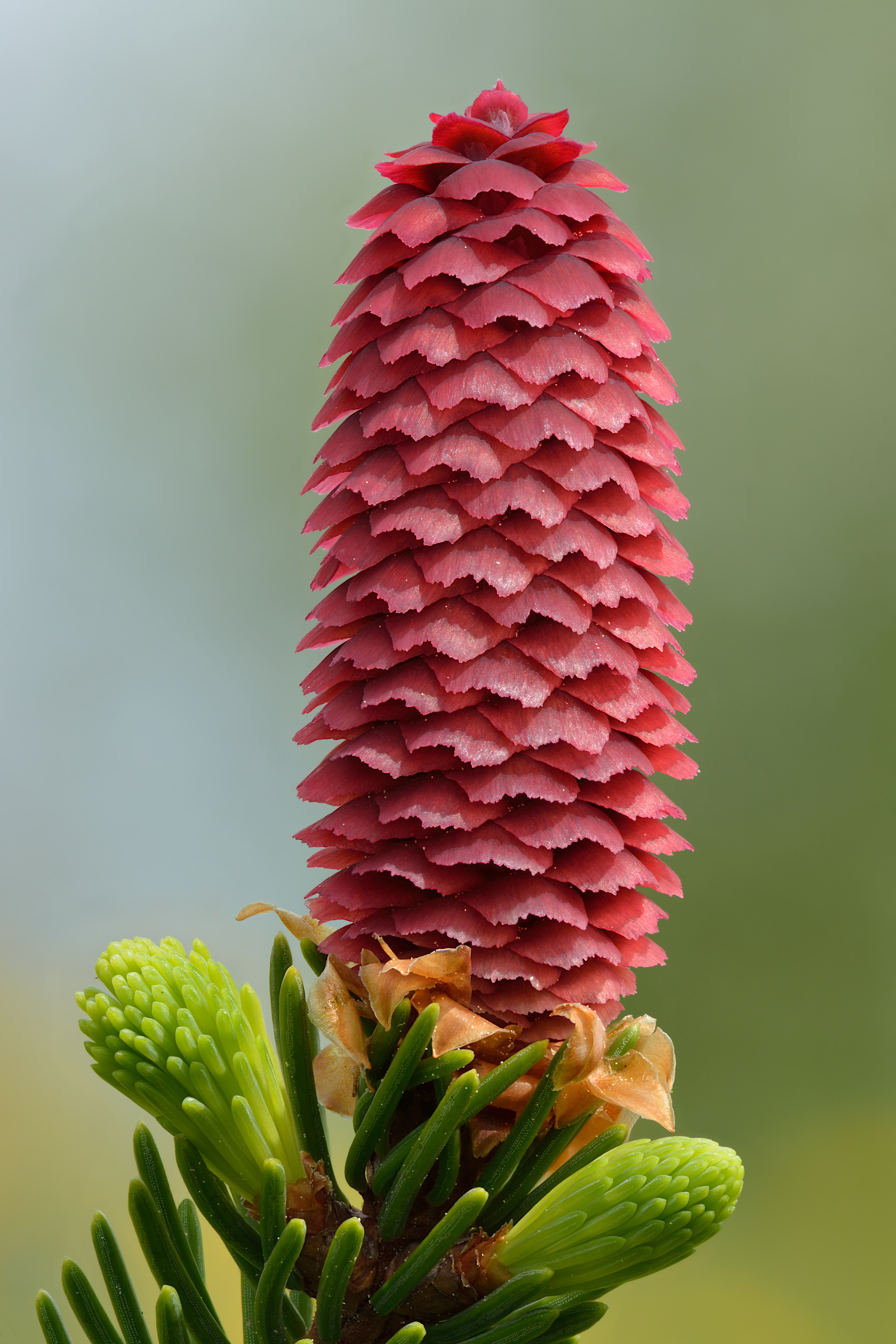
Young female cone of Picea abies, bracts visible

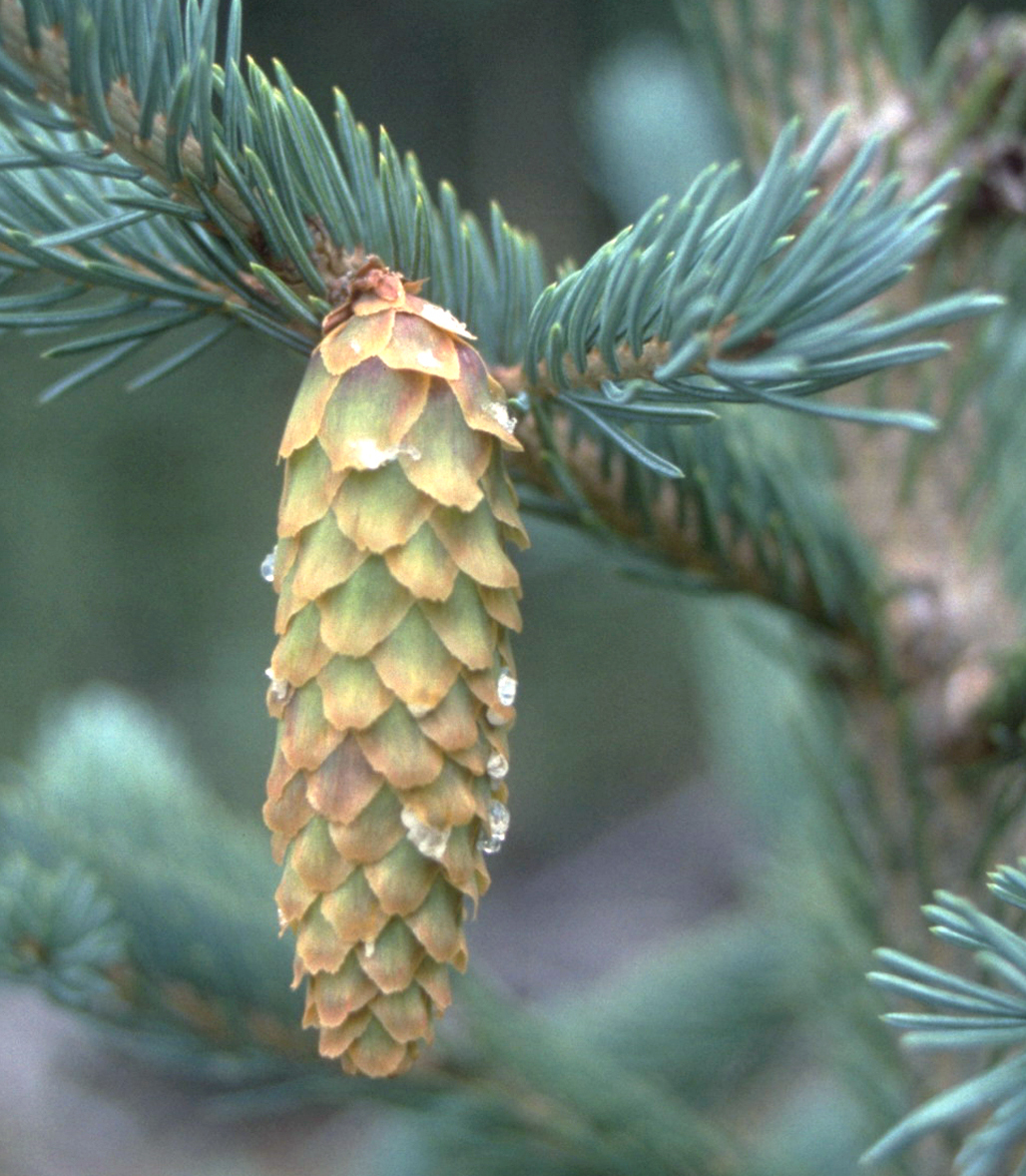
Resinous mature female cone of Picea engelmannii, bracts no longer visible

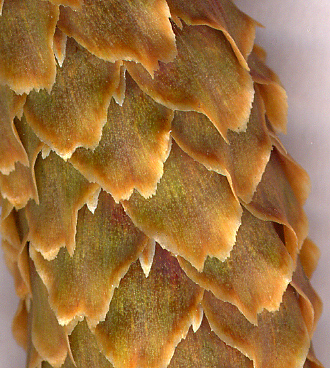
Exceptionally, the bracts can be just slightly exserted in mature cones of Picea sitchensis

== Evolution ==
=== Fossil history ===
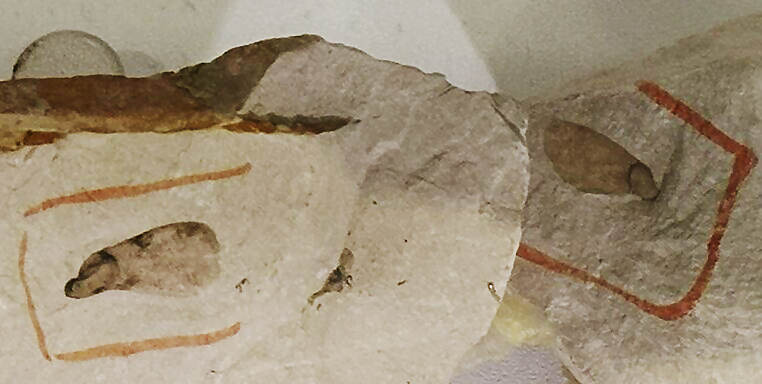
Fossilised winged seeds of Picea ugoana. Early Miocene, Niigata Prefecture, Japan

The Picea lineage begins in the fossil record around 130 million years ago (mya). The oldest record of spruce that has been found in the fossil record is from the Early Cretaceous (Valanginian) of western Canada, around 136 million years old.

The only surviving branch of the lineage, however, diverged only around 30 mya, meaning that the rest of the crown group has no living descendants. That, in turn, means that the biogeography and ecology of the crown group cannot be inferred from living members of the genus. For example, middle Eocene spruce fossils have been found in the Buchanan Lake Formation of Canada (46.2–40.4 mya).

=== External phylogeny ===
Based on a transcriptome analysis, Picea is most closely related to the genus Cathaya; those form a clade, sister to the genus Pinus. These genera, with douglas-firs and larches, form the pinoid clade of the Pinaceae.

- Pinaceae
  - Abietoideae (firs, cedars, hemlocks)
  - Pinoideae
    - Lariceae
      - Pseudotsuga (douglas‑firs)
      - Larix (larches)
    - Pineae
      - - Cathaya (1 sp.)
        - Picea (spruces)
      - Pinus (pines)

Another study produced broadly similar results, but with Cathaya sister to [Picea + Pinus]:

- Pineae
  - - Pinus (pines)
    - Picea (spruces)
  - Cathaya (1 sp.)

=== Internal phylogeny ===
DNA analyses have often conflicted with traditional classifications based on the morphology of needle and cone, but also conflict markedly between studies, with more proposed phylogenies than there are studies, and no consensus by 2015 on the relationships within the genus. In particular there is major discordance between phylogenies based on mitochondrial DNA (mtDNA) and those based on chloroplast DNA (cpDNA), and there is strong evidence for a history of reticulate evolution involving extensive hybrid introgression in the genus, which is continuing between several species, such as between Picea abies and Picea obovata (Picea × fennica), and between Picea glauca and Picea engelmannii (Picea × albertiana).

One of the earliest genetic studies used chloroplast DNA (cpDNA) to infer that P. breweriana is sister to all other Picea species, with P. sitchensis sister to those remaining species. However, subsequent studies have shown very different results, with both nuclear DNA and mtDNA placing P. sitchensis in a small clade with what had always been presumed from morphology to be its close relatives, P. glauca and P. engelmannii, with the cpDNA result anomalous; likewise, while P. breweriana has still been recovered as sister to all other species by some studies, it was recovered as deeply embedded in the genus by a study using a large set of nuclear, cp, and mtDNA. A further problem with several studies before 2013 was a combination of misidentified samples and contaminated DNA.

=== Taxonomy ===
==== Taxonomic history ====
In 1824, Albert Dietrich set up the genus Picea. In 1887, the German botanist Heinrich Moritz Willkomm revised the genus using vegetative characteristics of the trees, rather than of the cones. His classification was followed in 1890 by that of the German botanist Heinrich Mayr, and again in 1982 by that of the Taiwanese biologist Leroy Liu on a similar basis. In 1989 Peter A. Schmidt classified the species in the genus using mainly seed cone characteristics.

==== Species ====
As of September 2025, Plants of the World Online accepted 37 species. As no consensus has emerged on relationships from genetic studies, they are listed below in alphabetical order:

- Picea abies – Norway spruce, Europe; important in forestry, the original Christmas tree
- Picea alcoquiana – (syn. P. bicolor) Alcock's spruce, central Japan (mountains)
- Picea asperata – dragon spruce, western China; several varieties
- Picea aurantiaca Mast. (doubtfully distinct from P. asperata)
- Picea austropanlanica Silba (doubtfully distinct from P. purpurea)
- Picea brachytyla – Sargent's spruce, southwest China
- Picea breweriana – Brewer's spruce, Klamath Mountains, North America; local endemic
- Picea chihuahuana – Chihuahua spruce, northwest Mexico (rare, endangered)
- Picea crassifolia – Qinghai spruce, China
- Picea engelmannii – Engelmann spruce, western North American mountains; important in forestry
- Picea farreri – Burmese spruce, northeast Burma, southwest China (Yunnan)
- Picea glauca (syn. P. laxa) – white spruce, northern North America; important in forestry
- Picea glehnii – Glehn's spruce, northern Japan, Sakhalin
- Picea jezoensis – Jezo spruce, northeast Asia and Kamchatka south to Japan
- Picea koraiensis – Korean spruce, Korea, northeast China
- Picea koyamae – Koyama's spruce, Japan (mountains)
- Picea likiangensis – Likiang spruce, southwest China
- Picea linzhiensis (W.C.Cheng & L.K.Fu) Rushforth (syn. P. likiangensis var. linzhiensis) – Linzhi spruce, southeast Tibet (Yarlung Tsangpo valley)
- Picea mariana – black spruce, northern North America
- Picea martinezii – Martinez spruce, northeast Mexico (very rare, endangered)
- Picea maximowiczii – Maximowicz spruce, Japan (rare, mountains)
- Picea meyeri – Meyer's spruce, northern China (from Inner Mongolia to Gansu)
- Picea morrisonicola – Taiwan spruce, Taiwan (high mountains)
- Picea neoveitchii – Veitch's spruce, northwest China (rare, critically endangered)
- Picea obovata – Siberian spruce, north Scandinavia, Siberia; sometimes treated as a subspecies of P. abies (and hybridises with it), but has distinct cones
- Picea omorika – Serbian spruce, Serbia and Bosnia; local endemic; important in horticulture
- Picea orientalis – Caucasian spruce or Oriental spruce, Caucasus, northeast Turkey
- Picea polita (syn. P. torano) – tiger-tail spruce, Japan
- Picea pungens – blue spruce or Colorado spruce, Rocky Mountains, North America; important in horticulture
- Picea purpurea – purple cone spruce, western China
- Picea retroflexa – green dragon spruce, China
- Picea rubens – red spruce, northeastern North America; important in forestry
- Picea schrenkiana – Schrenk's spruce, mountains of central Asia
- Picea sitchensis – Sitka spruce, Pacific coast of North America; the largest species, to 95 m tall; important in forestry
- Picea smithiana – morinda spruce, western Himalaya, eastern Afghanistan, northern and northwest India
- Picea spinulosa – Sikkim spruce, northeast India (Sikkim) and Bhutan, eastern Himalaya
- Picea wilsonii – Wilson's spruce, western China

Natural hybrids

These hybrids are known to occur naturally:

- Picea × albertiana S.Br. (P. engelmannii × P. glauca)
- Picea × fennica (Regel) Kom. (P. abies × P. obovata)
- Picea × lutzii Little (P. glauca × P. sitchensis)
- Picea × notha Rehder (Picea glehnii × Picea jezoensis)

Cultivated hybrids

The following cultivated origin hybrids have been named; many others have been reported without being named:

- Picea × mariorika Boom (P. mariana × P. omorika)
- Picea × moseri Mast. (P. jezoensis × P. mariana)
- Picea × saaghyi Gayer (P. glauca × P. jezoensis)

The un-named hybrid between Picea omorika and Picea sitchensis shows marked hybrid vigour and has been considered of potential interest in forestry.

=== Genome ===
The nuclear, mitochondrial and chloroplast genomes of British Columbia interior spruce Picea × albertiana have been sequenced. The large (20 Gbp) nuclear genome and associated gene annotations of interior spruce (genotype PG29) were published in 2013 and 2015.

== Ecology ==
=== Establishment ===
Spruce seedlings are most vulnerable from germination to the following spring. More than half of spruce seedling mortality probably occurs during the first growing season and remains high during the first winter. Seedlings four to five years old can be considered "established", since only unusual factors such as snow mould, fire, trampling, or browsing can then impair regeneration success. In dry habitats, seedlings can be considered established when three years old.

=== Distribution and habitat ===
Like firs and pines, spruces are important both ecologically and economically in the Northern Hemisphere. While some species are widespread, most have limited geographical ranges. Like firs but unlike pines, spruces are mainly confined to colder areas, with many species in the west of China. The spruces are less tolerant of heat than the firs, and accordingly their distribution reaches further north and less far south.

=== Diseases ===
Sirococcus blight is caused by the deuteromycete fungus Sirococcus tsugae. It affects spruces across the Northern Hemisphere, both in forests and in nurseries, causing severe defoliation and shoot blight. It first appeared in Germany and the United Kingdom in 2014. It is spread when rain splashes on the asexual conidia. Control is limited to biosecurity measures.

Rhizosphaera needle cast, a disease that causes leaf fall, is caused by the infection of spruces by the ascomycete fungus Rhizosphaera in North America. It causes severe defoliation. Dead needles show rows of black fruiting bodies. Infection is mainly on lower branches. Control is possible with the fungicide Chlorothalonil, which prevents new infection, if all needles can be sprayed.

Canker disease of spruce is caused by the ascomycete fungal pathogen Leucostoma kunzei (also called Cytospora and Valsa). It is dispersed by spores from pycnidia within the tree's bark, which contain asexual conidia. The conidia are spread by rain splash. The disease affects all spruce species. Trees are more vulnerable under water stress. Fungicides containing copper prevent new infection but these are readily washed off by rain and are not suitable for forestry use.

=== Predators ===
Small mammals ingest conifer seeds, and consume seedlings. The short-tailed meadow vole (Microtus pennsylvanicus Ord) voraciously eats white spruce and lodgepole pine seedlings, pulling them out of the ground and consuming them whole. The impact varies; in western Montana, spruce seedling success was little better on protected than on unprotected seed spots, but in British Columbia, spruce regeneration depends on protection from rodents. A mouse can eat 2000 white spruce seeds per night. Seed losses can be large: repeated applications of half a million white spruce seeds per hectare in Alberta failed to produce the required 750 trees per hectare.

Larger mammals too can have an impact; as much as 90% of a cone crop can be harvested by red squirrels, while bark-stripping of white spruce by black bears is locally important in Alaska.

=== Pests ===
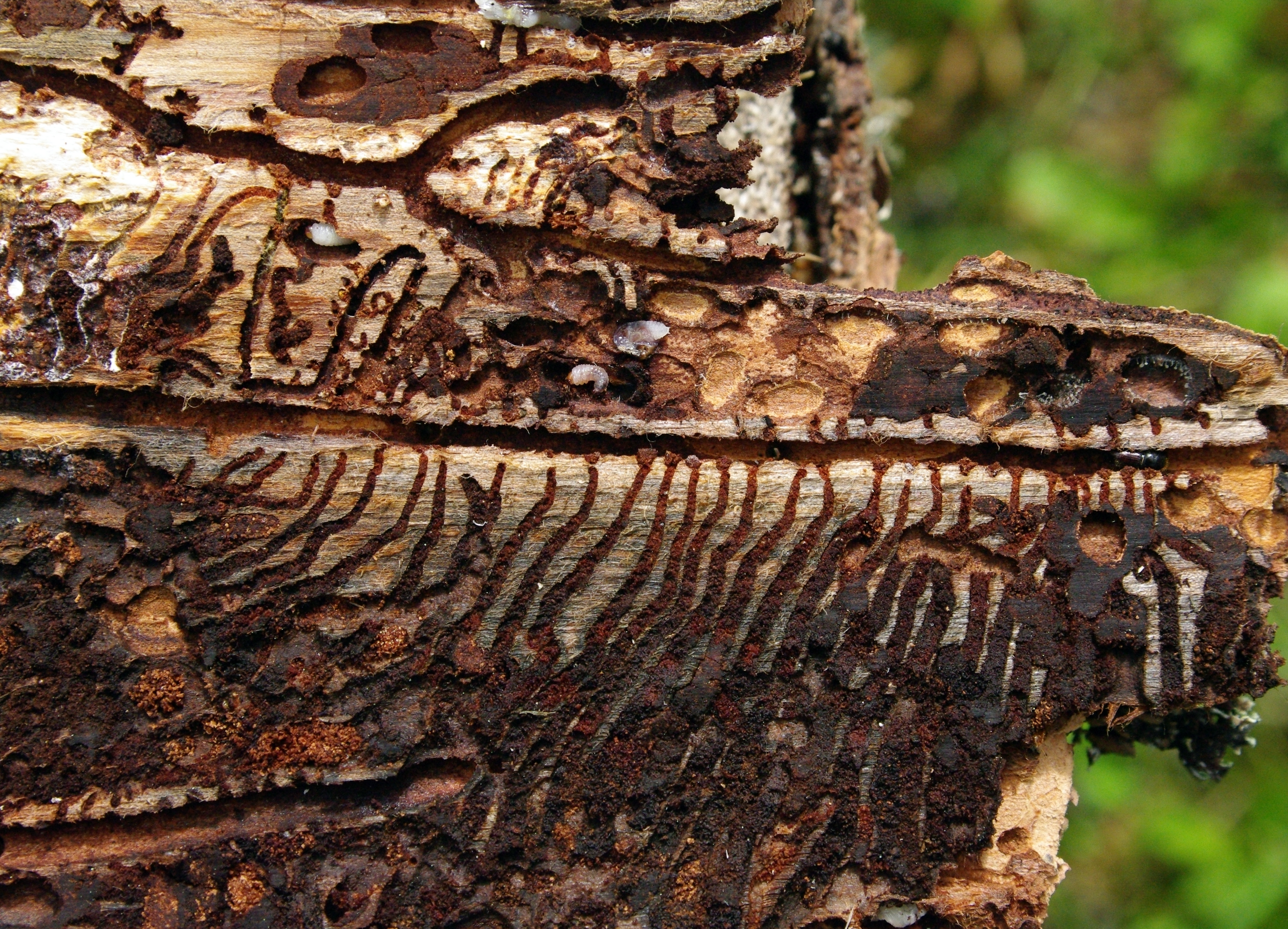
Gallery of the European spruce bark beetle (Ips typographus) in the inner bark (phloem).

The European spruce bark beetle (Ips typographus, also called the eight-toothed spruce bark beetle) lays its eggs in the inner bark (phloem) of Picea abies, other spruces, and sometimes other conifers across Europe and Asia. They bring with them ophiostomatoid fungi, some of them serious tree pathogens. The larvae make tunnels in the phloem; in large numbers, they can cut off the phloem and kill the tree.

The eastern spruce budworm (Choristoneura fumiferana) is a major pest of spruce trees in forests throughout Canada and the eastern United States. Two of the main host plants are black spruce and white spruce. Population levels oscillate, sometimes reaching extreme outbreak levels that can cause extreme defoliation of and damage to spruce trees. To reduce destruction, there are multiple methods of control in place, including pesticides.

The great spruce bark beetle (Dendroctonus rufipennis) is a destructive pest of spruce forests in western North America, and has become widespread in Europe and Asia. It arrived in the United Kingdom sometime between 1973 and 1982. It causes dieback of spruce, worst when the trees are stressed by drought. Continued attack can kill the trees. The pest is subject to effective biological control by a natural predator, the Siberian beetle Rhizolophus grandis.

The green spruce aphid (Elatobium abietinum can cause significant defoliation and occasionally tree death in areas with mild winters. It is native to northern and eastern Europe, where it causes little damage as its population is kept in check by the low winter temperatures in the continental climate of the region, with significant aphid mortality occurring when the air temperature drops below -8°C. It becomes much more damaging on spruces in oceanic climates with mild winters such as Great Britain, where it is able to breed more continuously through the winter.

== Uses ==
=== Timber ===
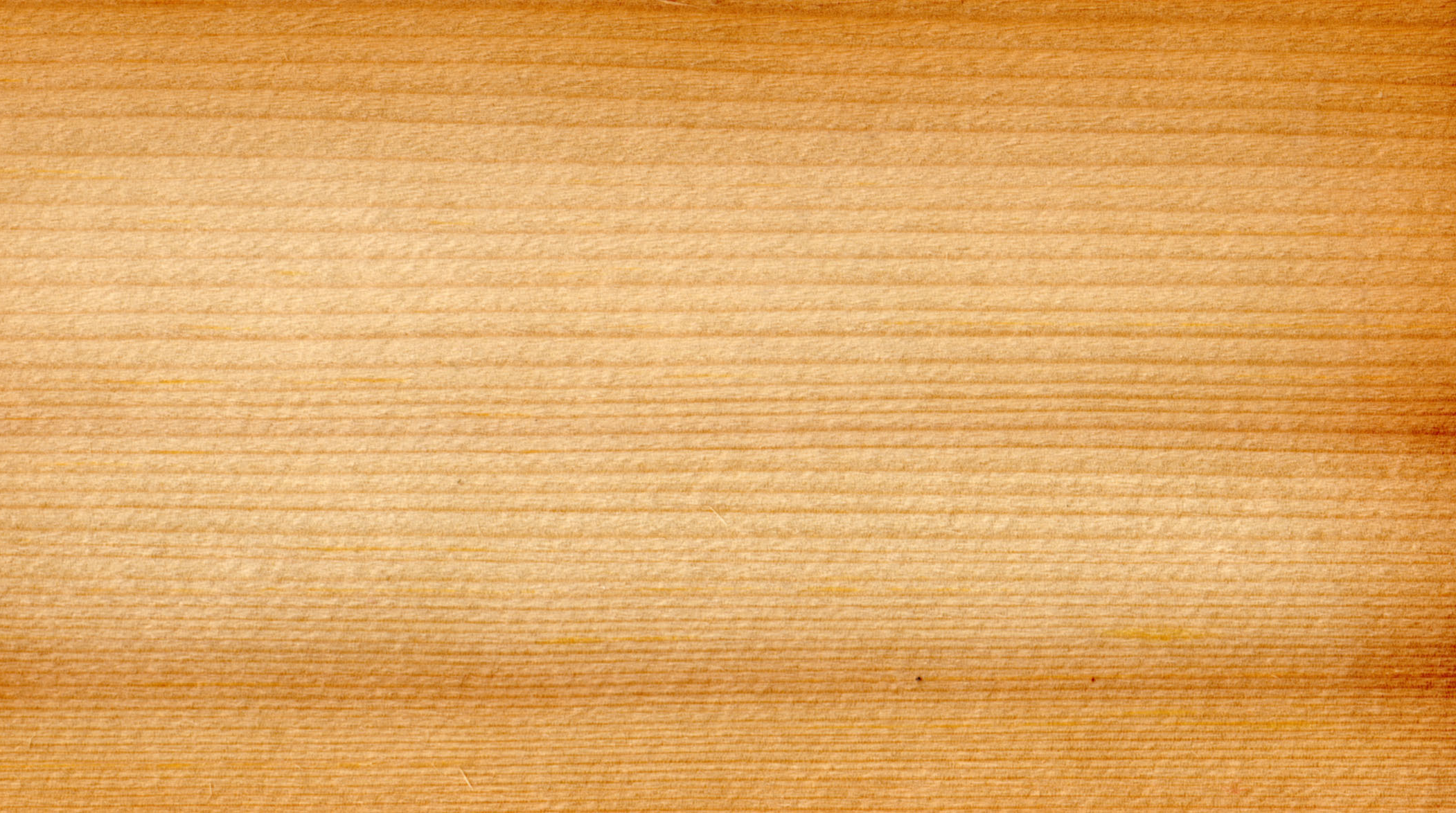
Wood of Norway spruce

Spruce is useful as a building wood, known by names such as North American timber, SPF (spruce-pine-fir) and whitewood. It is commonly used in Canadian Lumber Standard (CLS) graded wood. Spruce wood is used for many purposes, ranging from general construction work and crates to highly specialised uses in wooden aircraft. The Wright brothers' first aircraft, the Flyer, was built of spruce, but the 1947 Hughes H-4 Hercules flying boat, known as the "Spruce Goose", was, in fact, mainly made of birch.

Because this species has poor resistance to insects and fungi after logging, it is recommended for indoor construction, such as indoor drywall framing. Spruce wood left outside cannot be expected to last more than 12–18 months depending on the climate.

=== Tonewood ===
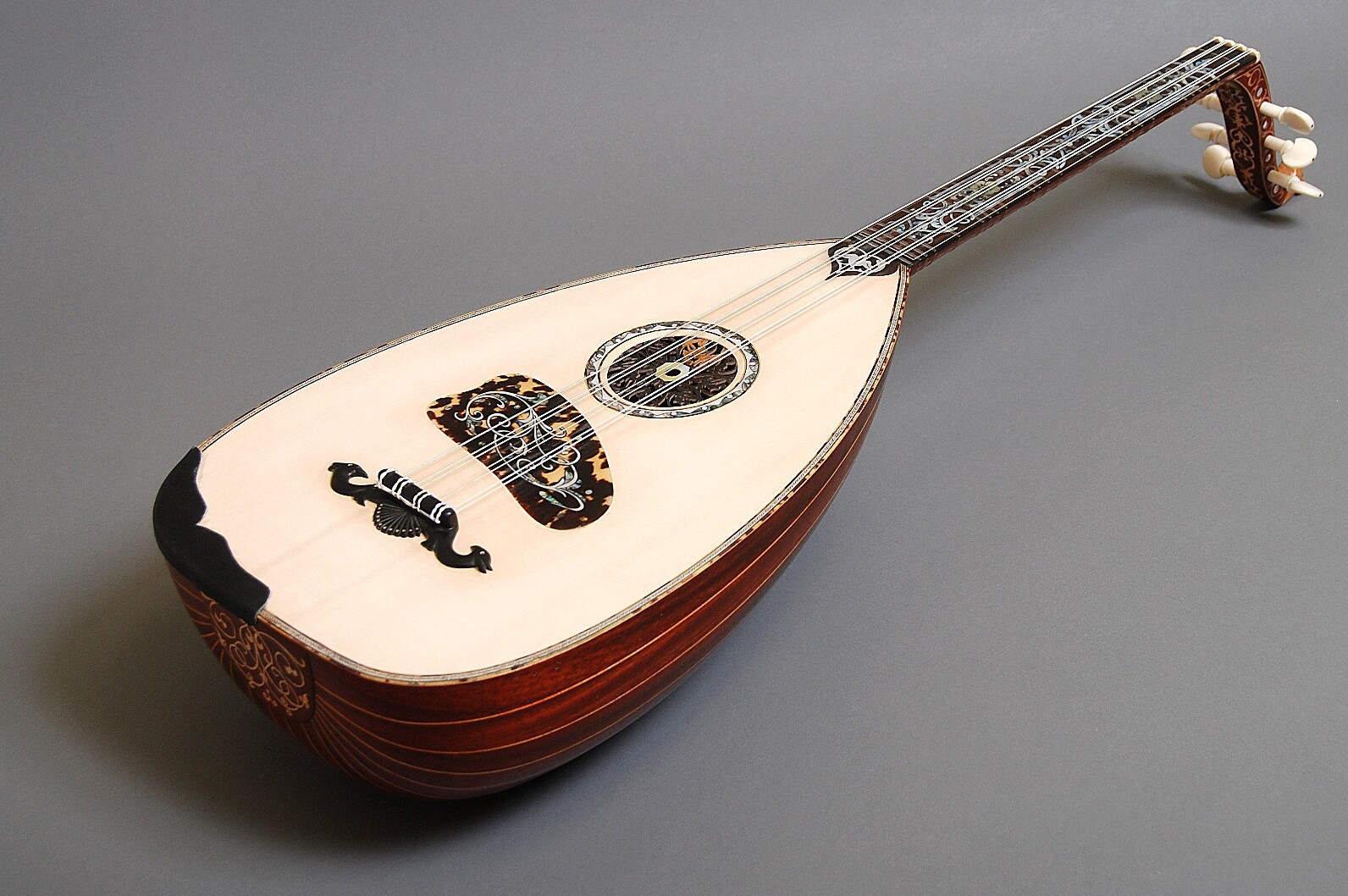
A lute with a spruce soundboard

Spruce is the standard material used in soundboards for stringed instruments, including guitars. Wood used for this purpose is called tonewood. Species used include Engelmann spruce in North America, and Sitka spruce in Europe. In the Dolomites, the Norway spruces of the Paneveggio "Violins Forest" have for centuries been used for making musical instruments, supposedly including by the leading violin-maker Antonio Stradivari.

=== Paper ===
Spruce is a good pulpwood, as it has long fibres which bind together to make strong paper, especially from trees over 60 years old. The pulp, known as northern bleached softwood kraft (NBSK), is used to make products such as tissue paper.

=== Other materials ===
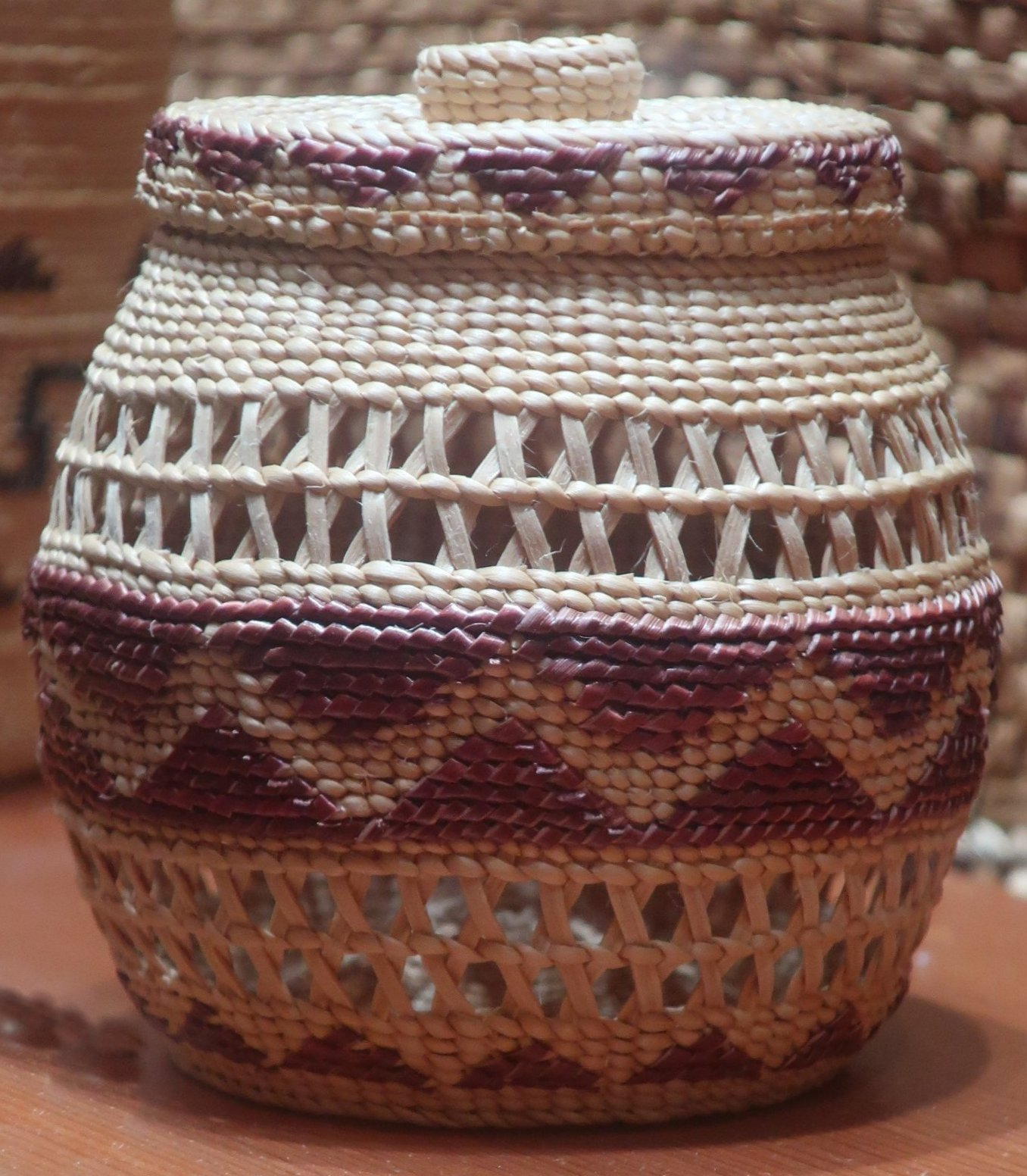
A spruce root basket woven by Tlingit people, Alaska

The resin was used in the manufacture of pitch in the past (before the use of petrochemicals); the scientific name Picea derives from Latin picea "pitch pine" (the Scots pine). Native Americans use the thin, pliable roots of some species for weaving baskets and for sewing together pieces of birch bark for canoes. Kiidk'yaas, felled in 1997, was a golden Sitka Spruce sacred to the Haida people. Spruces are popular ornamental trees. Picea abies is extensively used as Christmas trees. Spruce branches are used at Aintree Racecourse in Liverpool to build fences used as horse jumps on the Grand National course.

=== Folk medicine ===
The resin of Norway spruce (Picea abies) has been used in Nordic folk medicine for treating wounds and skin disorders.

=== Food and drink ===
The fresh shoots of many spruces are a natural source of vitamin C. Captain Cook made alcoholic sugar-based spruce beer during his sea voyages in order to prevent scurvy in his crew. Spruce beer has been brewed in Canada since the 18th century.

In Finland, young spruce buds are sometimes used as a spice, or boiled with sugar to create spruce bud syrup.

=== In art ===
Around 1900, Edvard Munch made numerous oil paintings of spruce forests, now in the Munch Museum in Oslo. The Finnish artist and photographer Eija-Liisa Ahtila's work Horizontal–Vaakasuora, exhibited from 2012 at Stockholm's Moderna Museet and the Shirley Sherwood Gallery depicts a 30-metre-tall spruce, arranged horizontally, in six large video panels. (Note: A still from the installation can be seen at Eija-Liisa Ahtila.) XIBT magazine described it as "delving into notions of ecology and symbiosis as well as the essence of existentialism within the context of our external world."

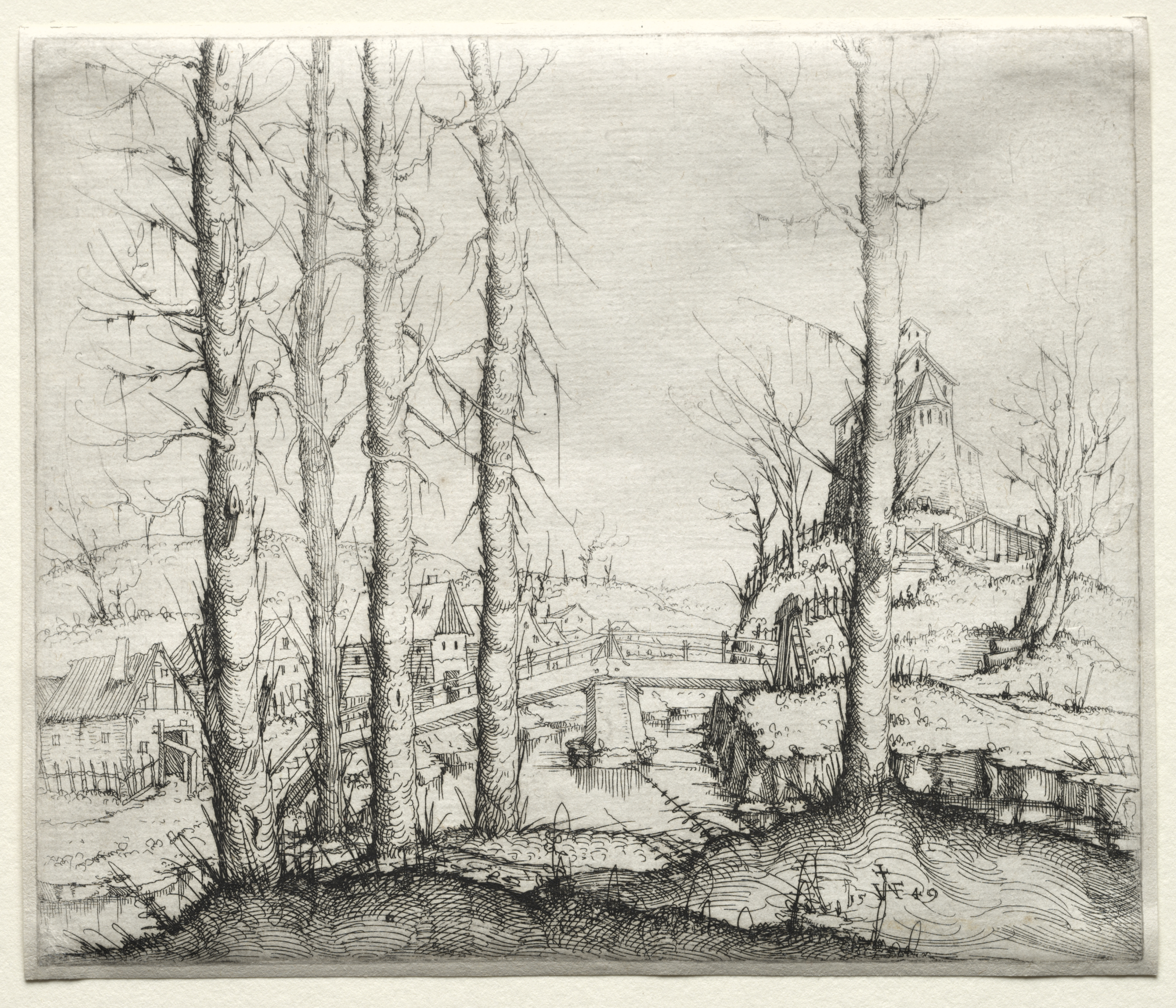
Augustin Hirschvogel, River Landscape with Five Bare Spruce Trees, etching, 1549

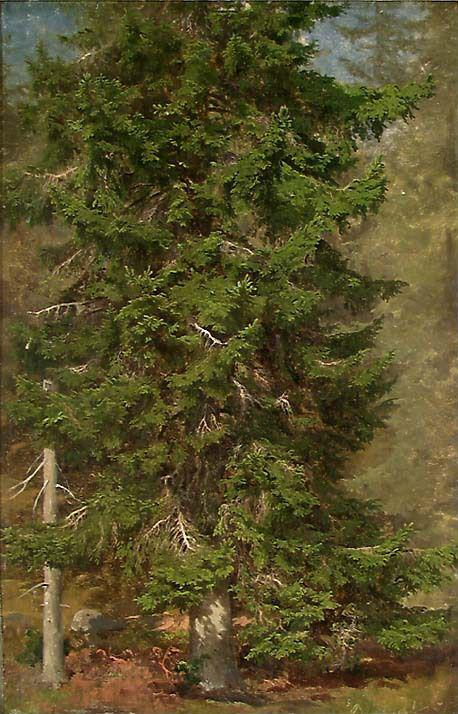
Joachim Frich, Study of a Spruce, oil on board, 1851

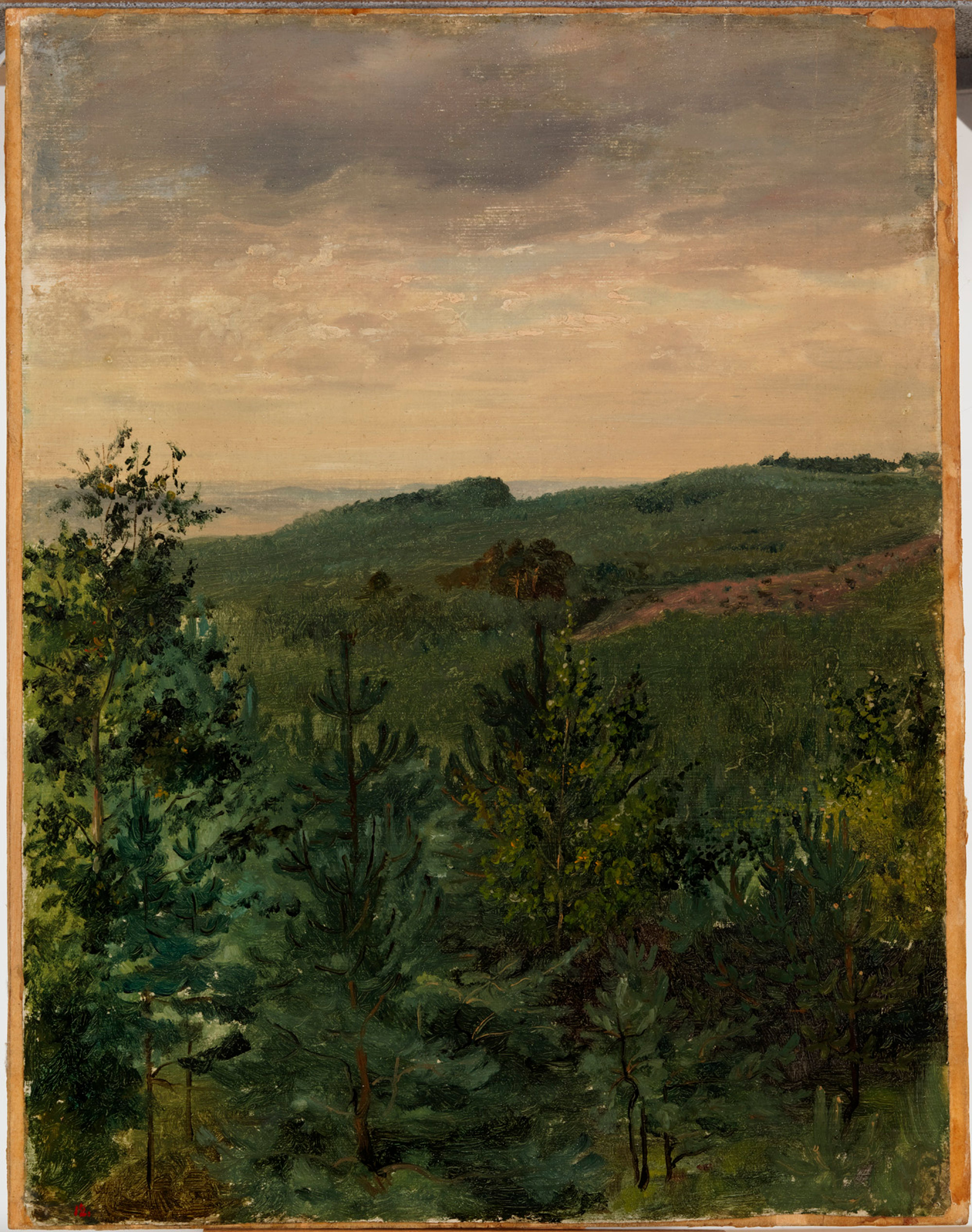
Werner Holmberg, Spruce Saplings in Sandy Soil, Study, 1854

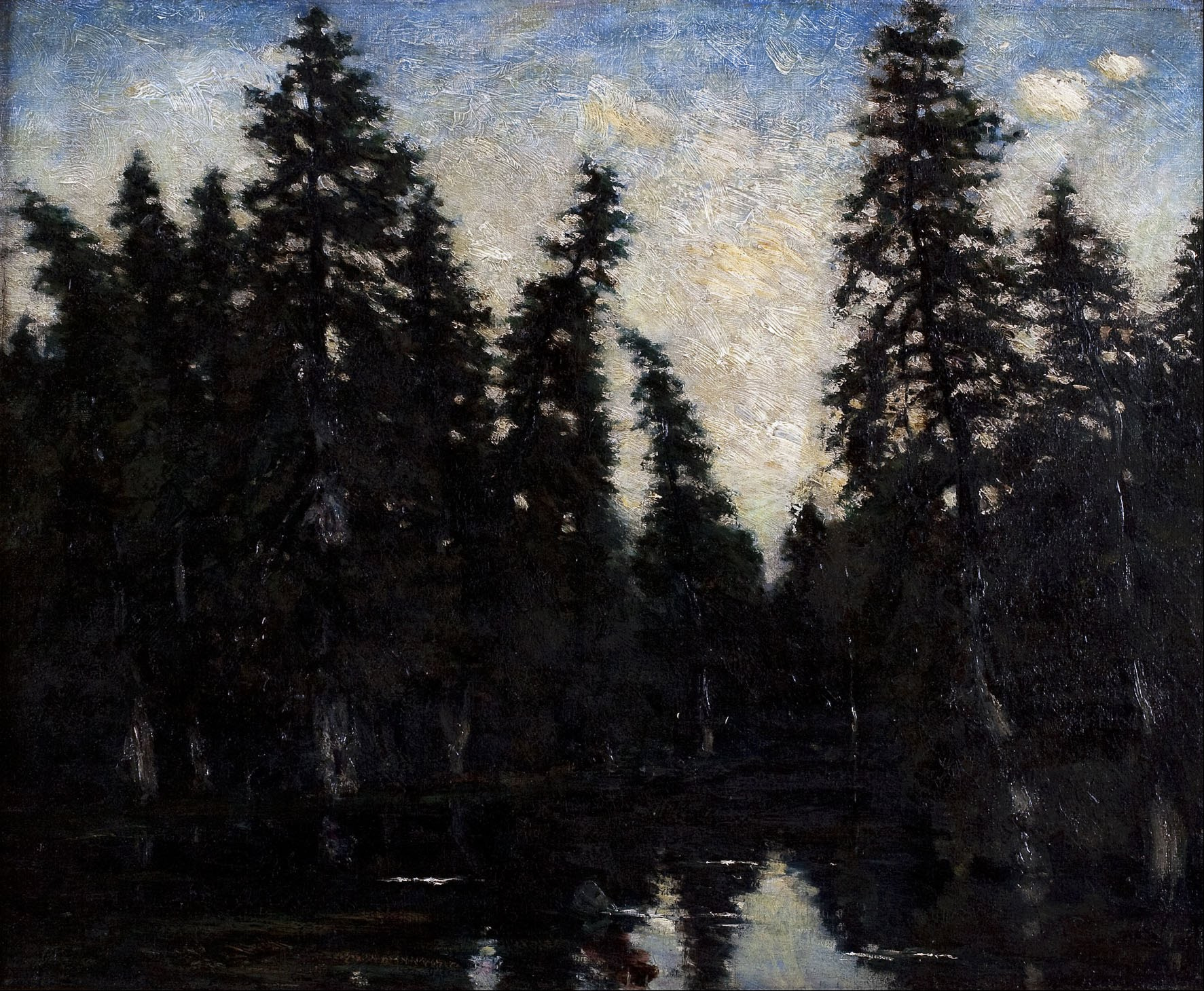
Carl Fredrik Hill, The Black Spruces, oil on canvas, 1878

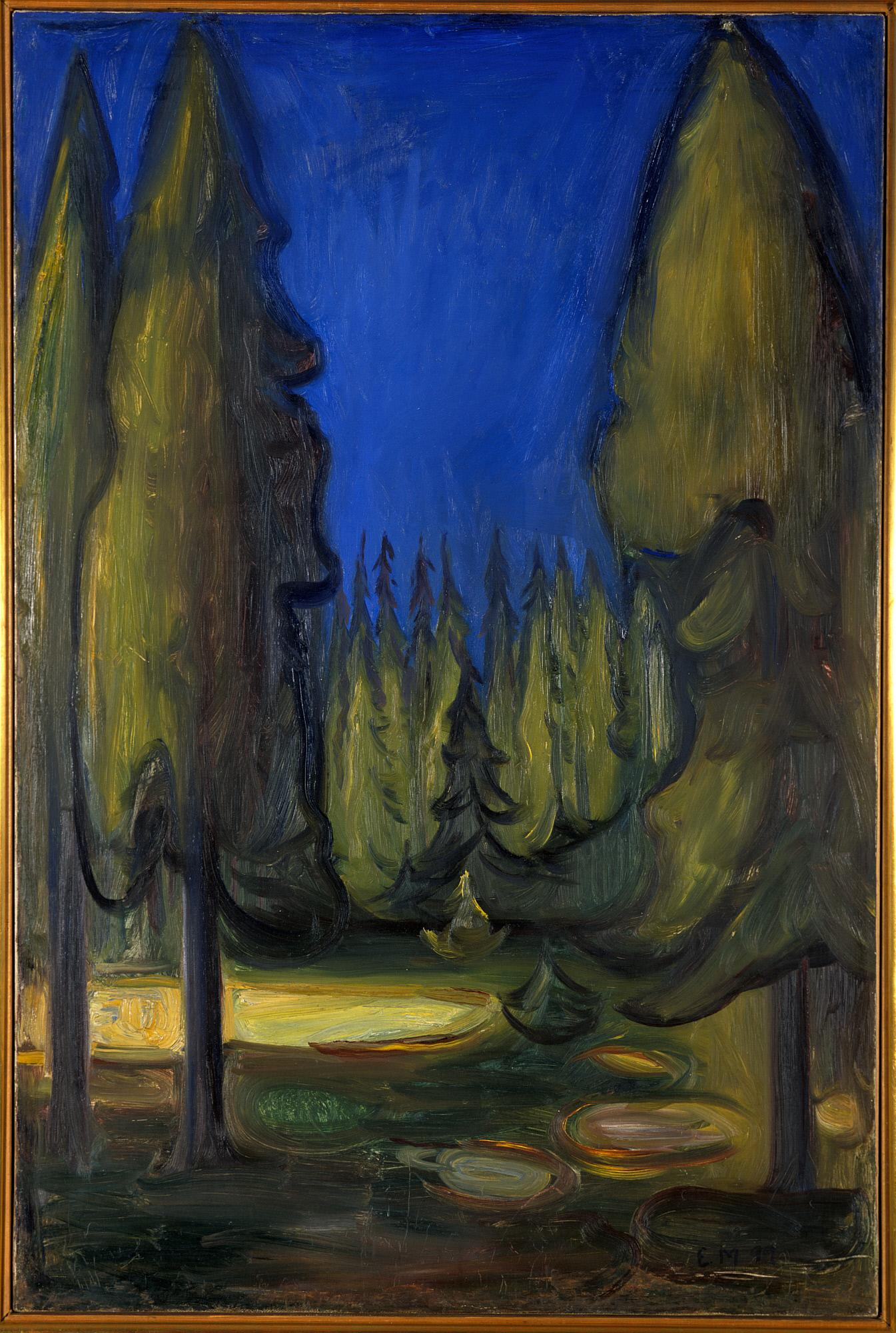
Edvard Munch, Dark Spruce Forest, oil on canvas, 1899

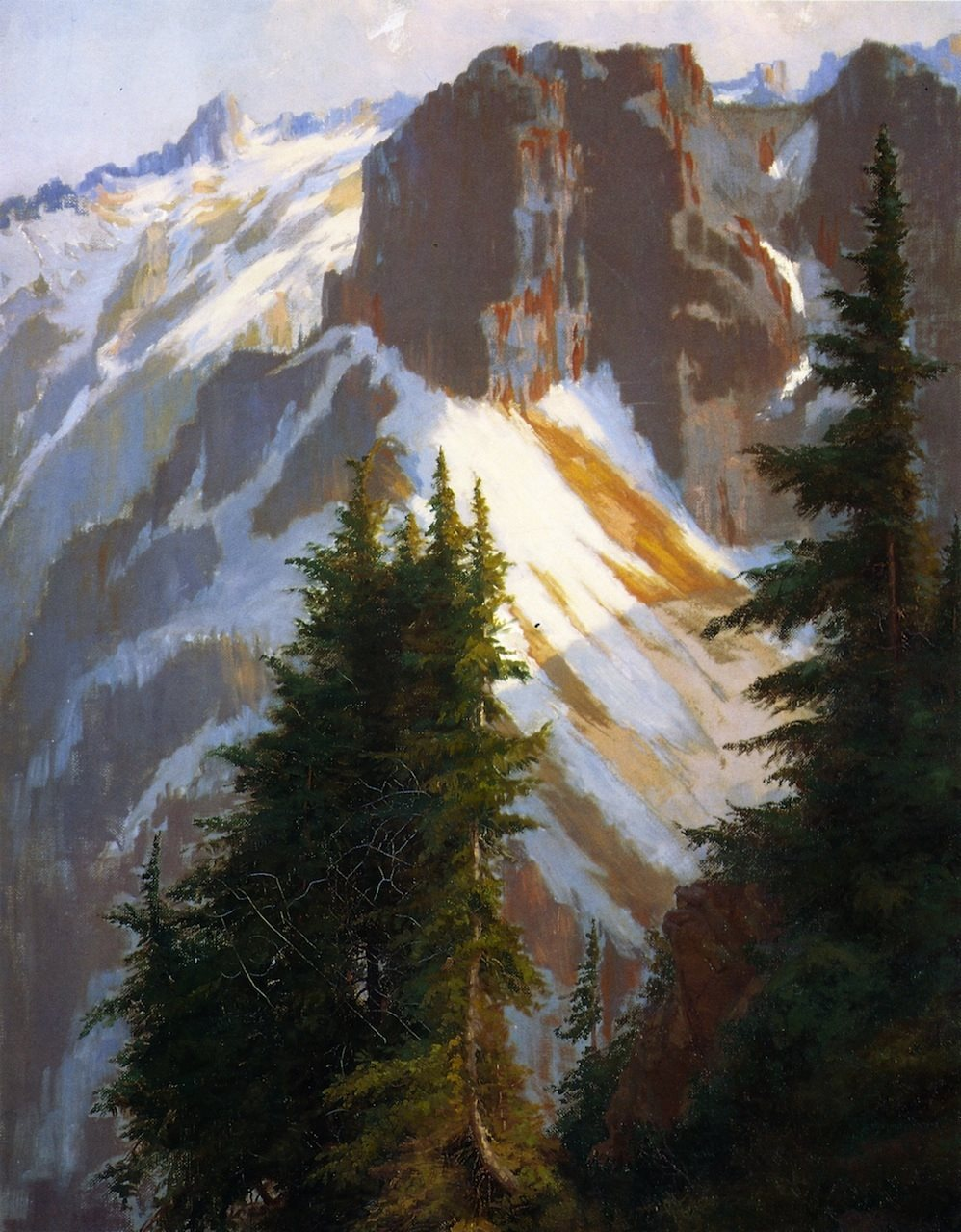
Abby Williams Hill, Basaltic Rocks, oil on canvas, 1904

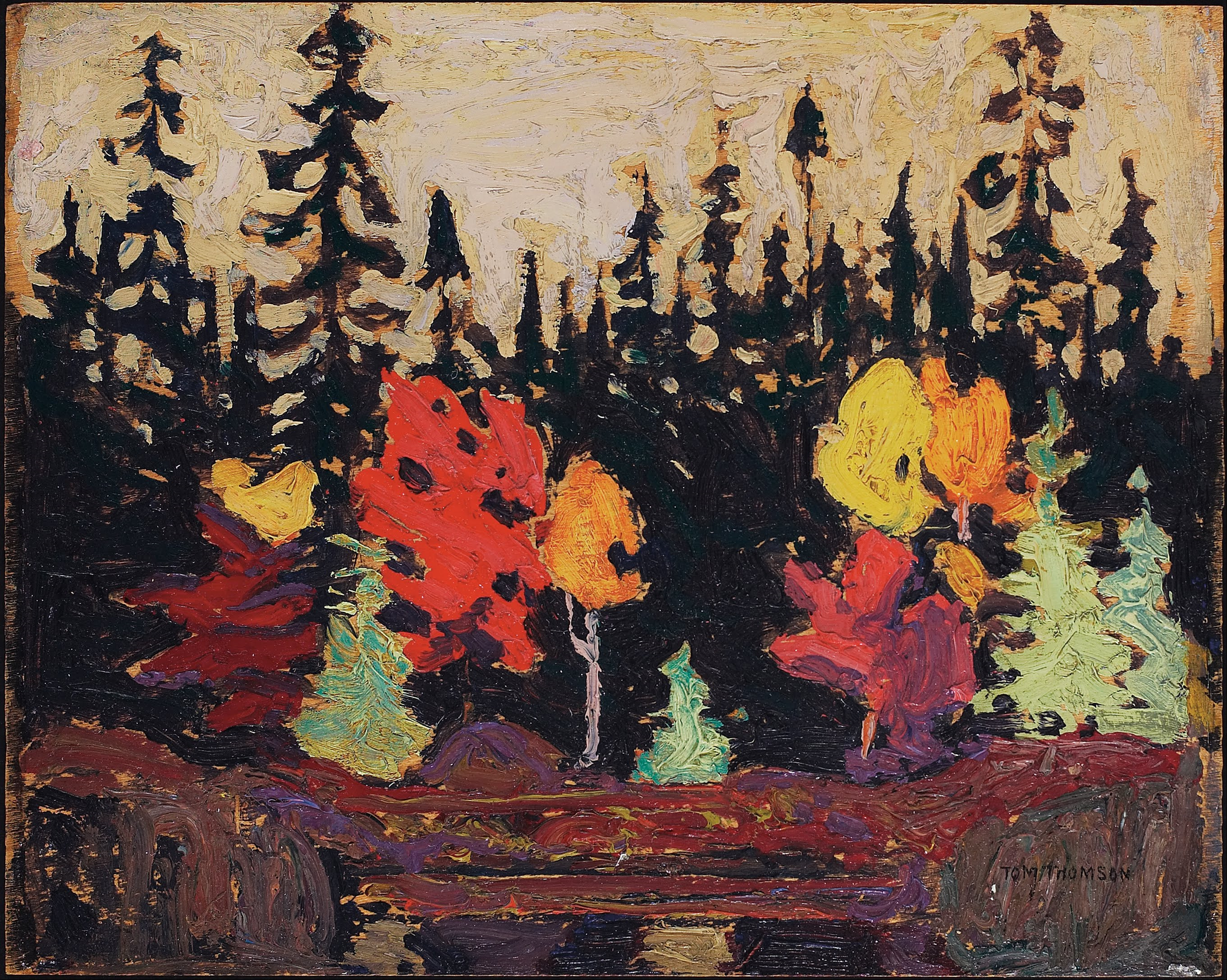
Tom Thomson, Black Spruce and Maple, oil on wood panel, 1915
