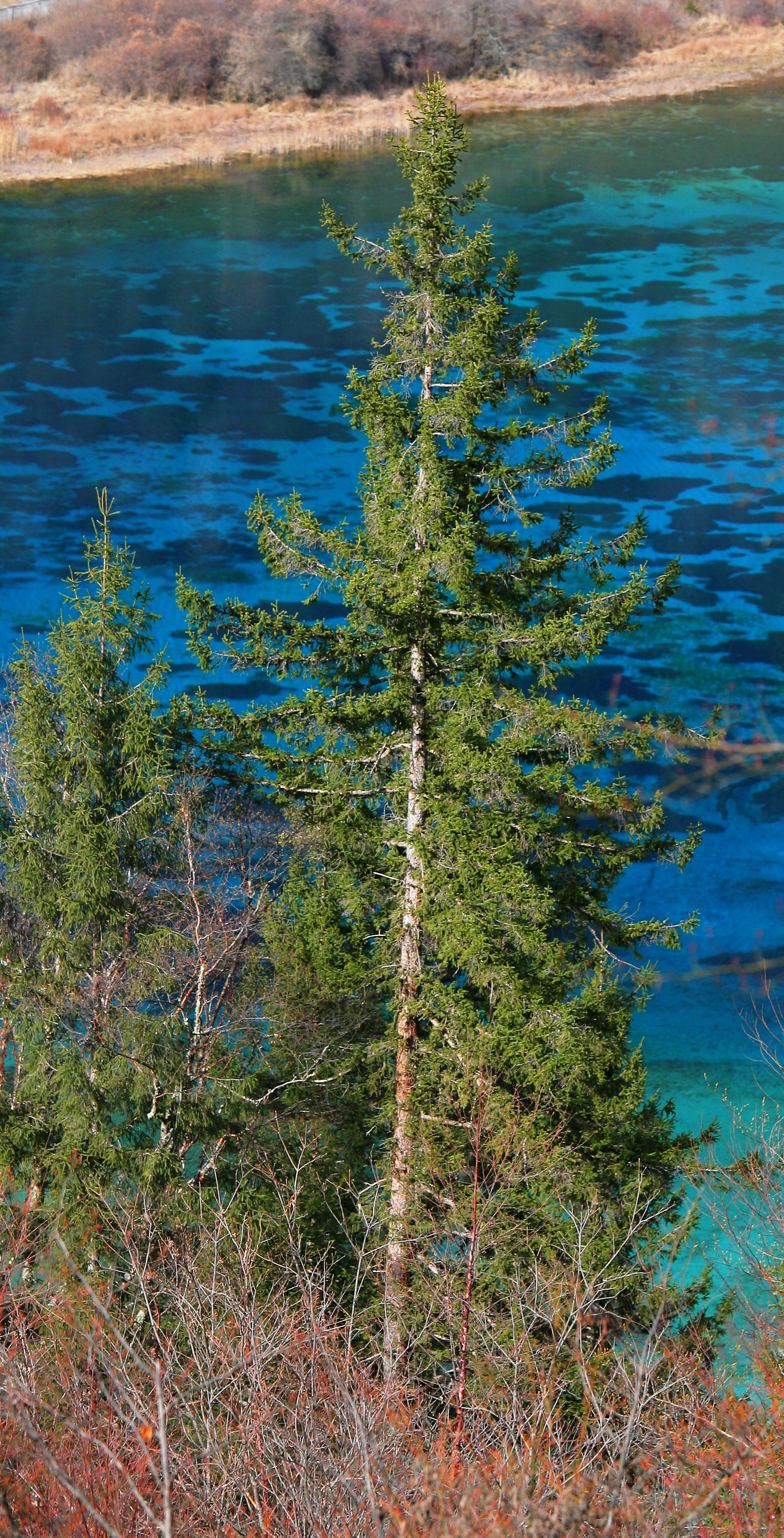

Conservation status
- Least Concern (IUCN 3.1)

Scientific classification
- Kingdom: Plantae
- Clade: Tracheophytes
- Clade: Gymnospermae
- Division: Pinophyta
- Class: Pinopsida
- Order: Pinales
- Family: Pinaceae
- Genus: Picea
- Species: P. wilsonii

Binomial name
- Picea wilsonii Mast.

Synonyms
- Heterotypic Synonyms: Picea fricksii Silba; Picea mastersii Mayr; Picea shennongjianensis Silba; Picea watsoniana Mast.; Picea wilsonii f. mastersii (Mayr) J.Hoch; Picea wilsonii var. shanxiensis Silba; Picea wilsonii subsp. shanxiensis (Silba) Silba; Picea wilsonii var. watsoniana (Mast.) Silba; Picea wilsonii subsp. watsoniana (Mast.) Silba

= Picea wilsonii =

Species of conifer

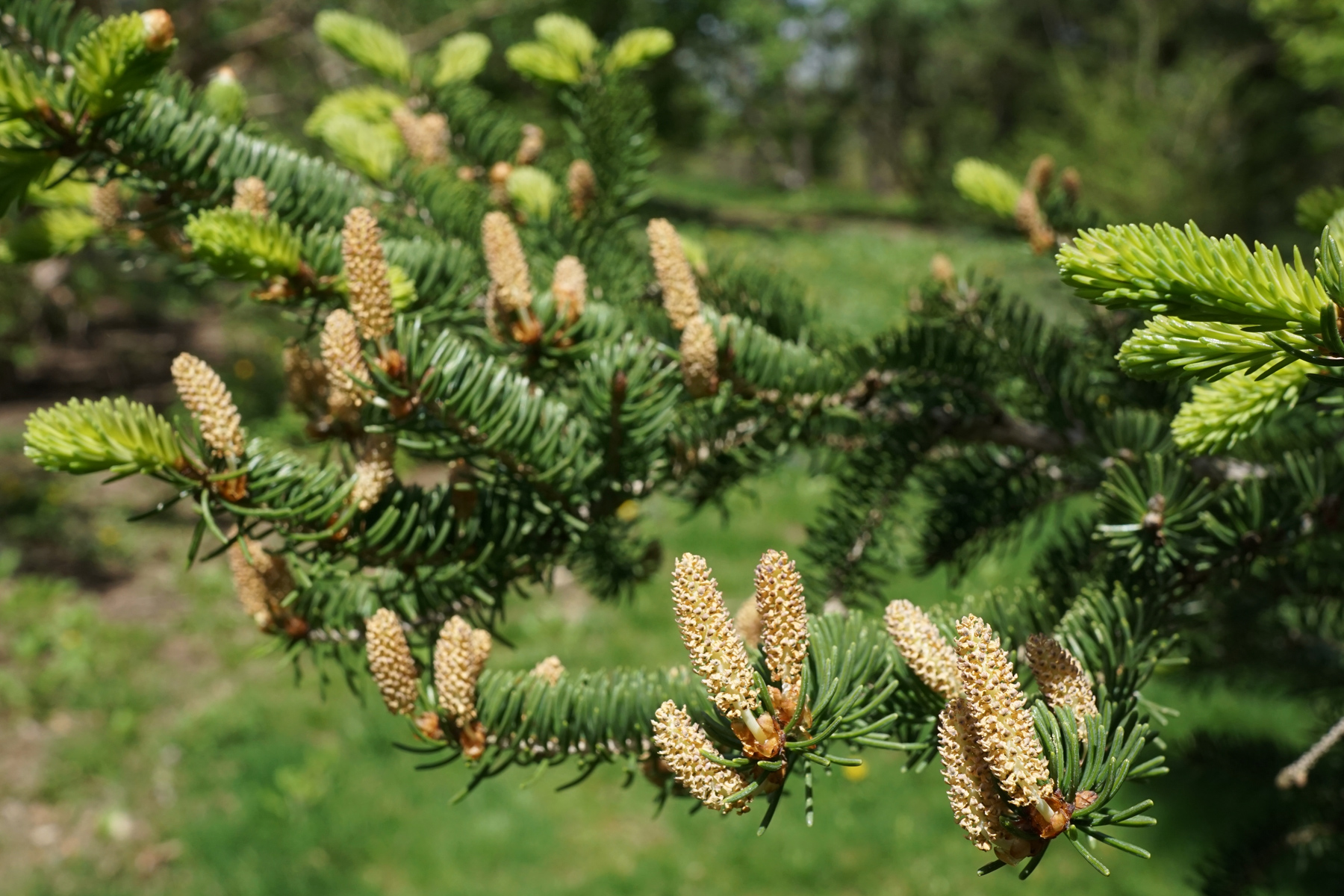
Cultivated Picea wilsonii

Picea wilsonii is a species of conifer in the family Pinaceae. It is found only in China.
