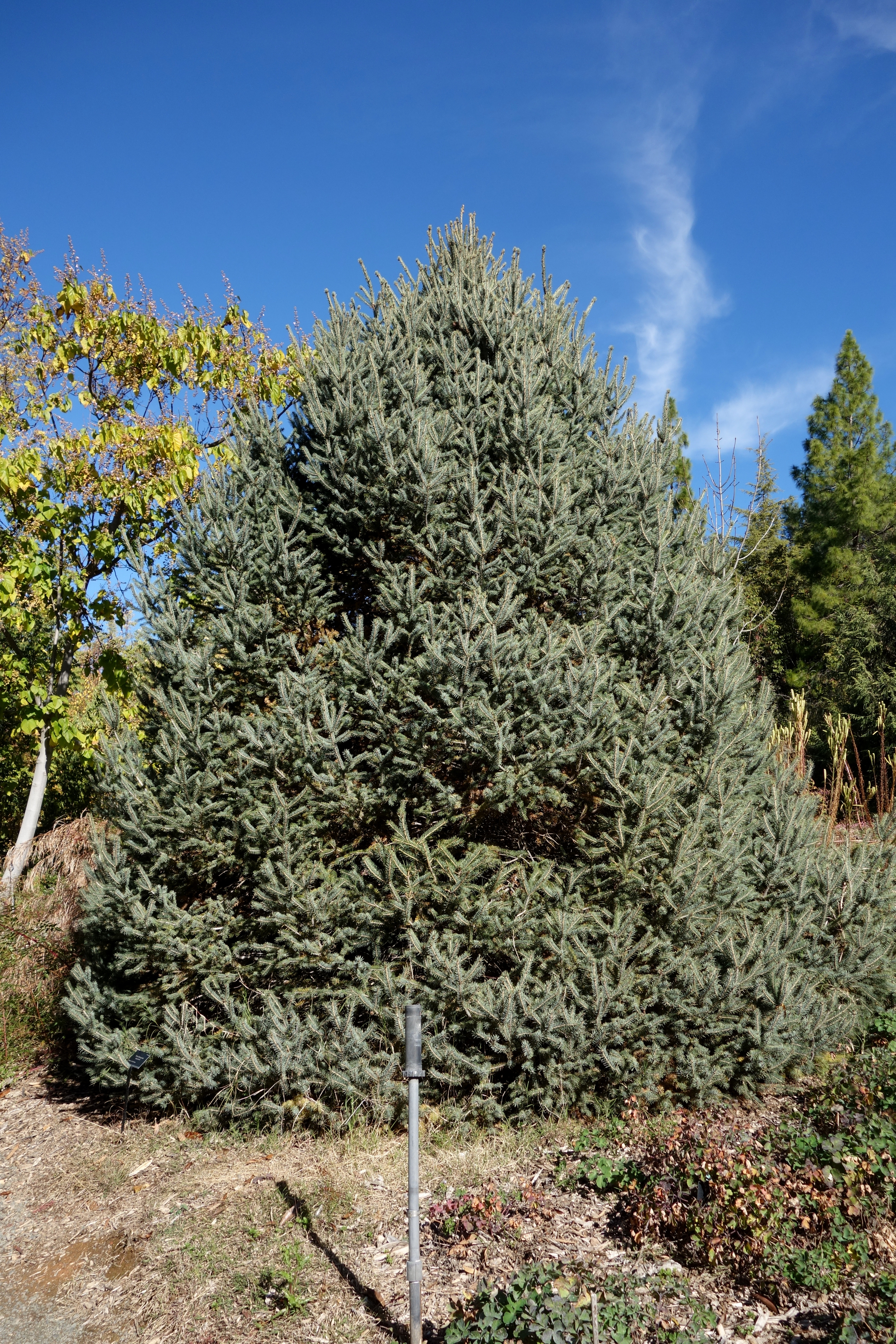

Conservation status
- Vulnerable (IUCN 3.1)

Scientific classification
- Kingdom: Plantae
- Clade: Tracheophytes
- Clade: Gymnospermae
- Division: Pinophyta
- Class: Pinopsida
- Order: Pinales
- Family: Pinaceae
- Genus: Picea
- Species: P. likiangensis

Binomial name
- Picea likiangensis (Franch.) E.Pritz.

Synonyms
- Abies likiangensis Franch.

= Picea likiangensis =

Species of conifer

Picea likiangensis, commonly known as Lijiang spruce, Lakiang spruce or Lijiang yunshan, is a species of spruce found in Bhutan and China. Its population has been reduced by 30% in 75 years by logging, and the species is therefore categorised as vulnerable by the IUCN.

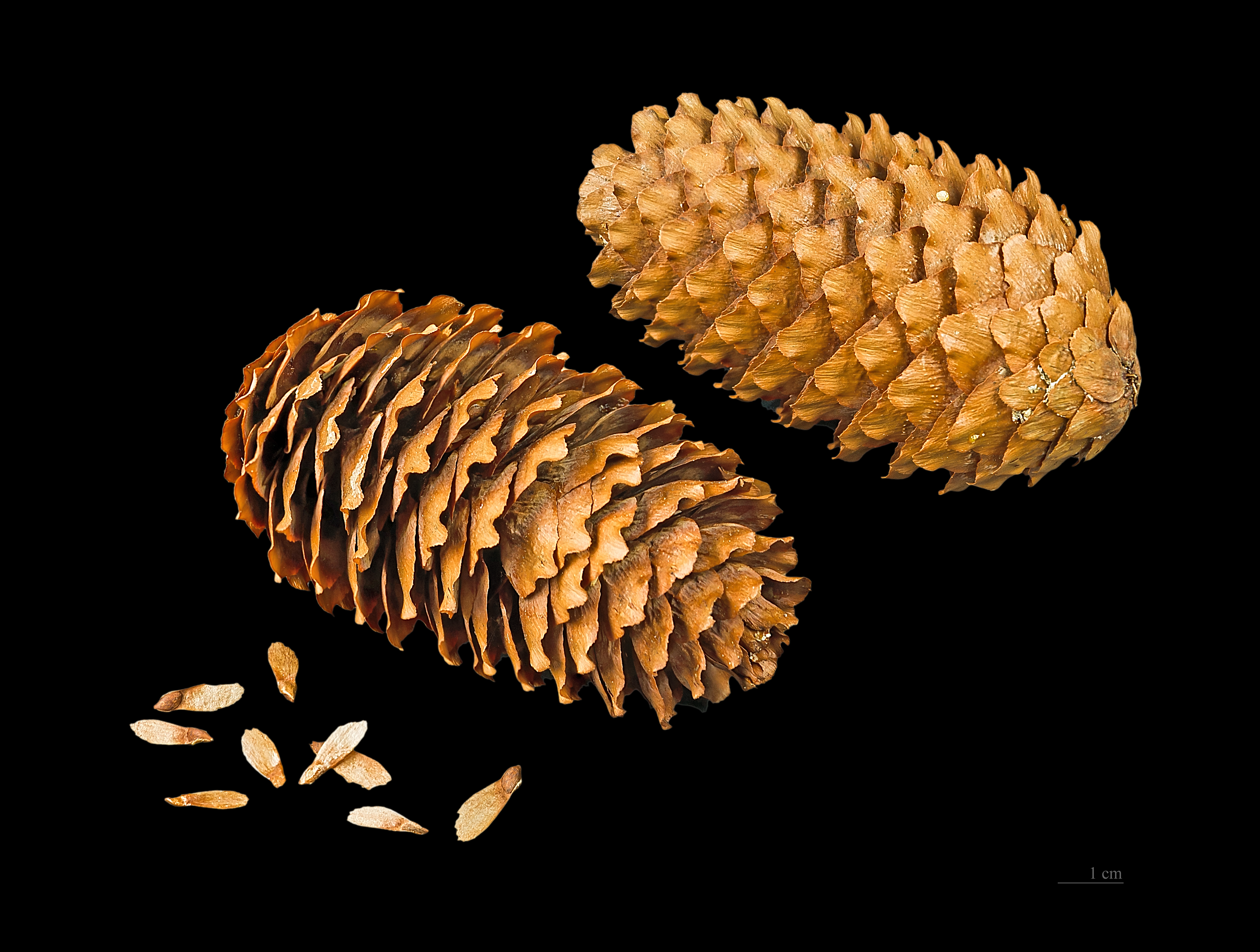
Cones of Picea likiangensis
