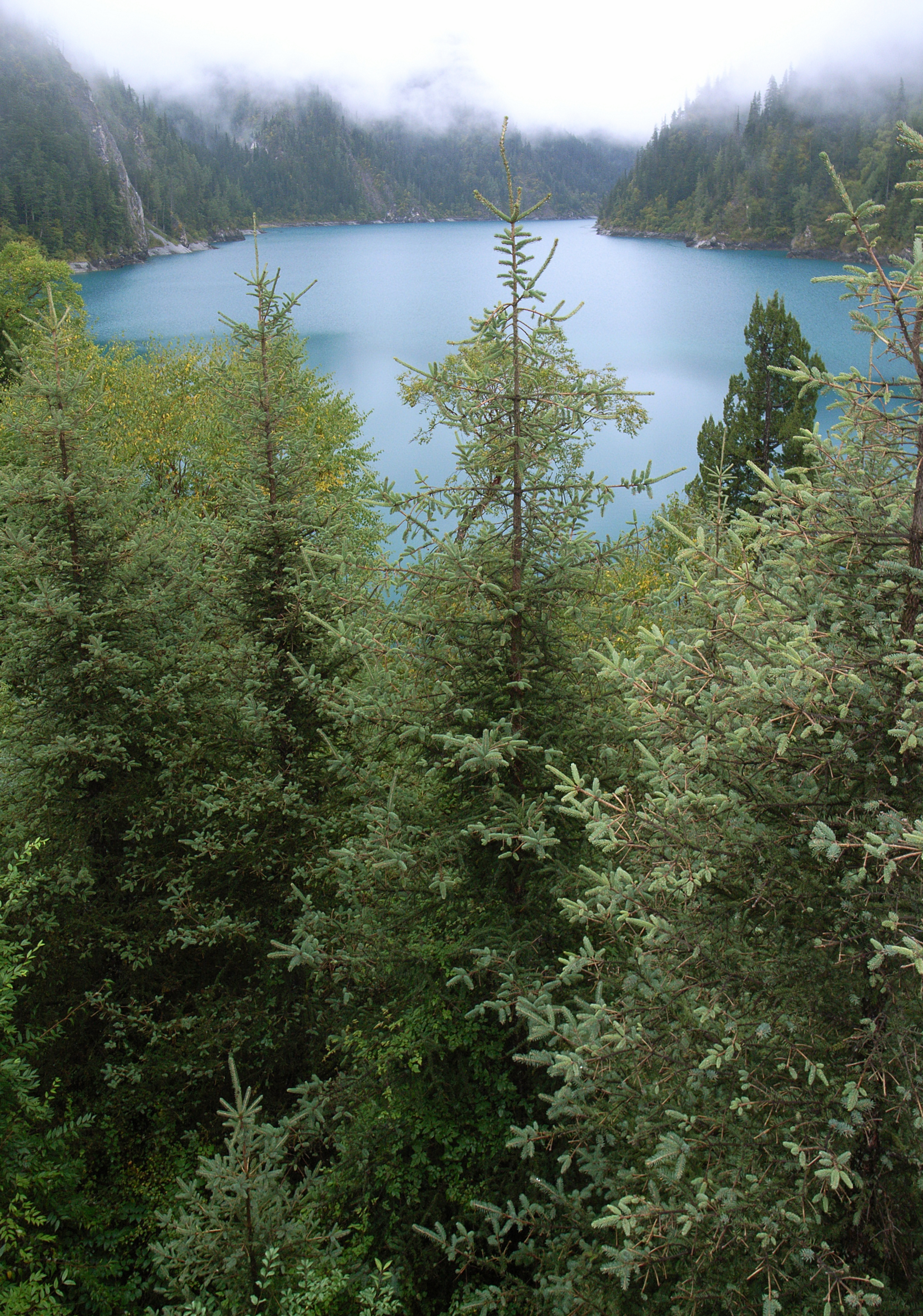
- Immature Picea asperata growing in the Jiuzhaigou Valley, Sichuan, China

Conservation status
- Vulnerable (IUCN 3.1)

Scientific classification
- Kingdom: Plantae
- Clade: Tracheophytes
- Clade: Gymnospermae
- Division: Pinophyta
- Class: Pinopsida
- Order: Pinales
- Family: Pinaceae
- Genus: Picea
- Species: P. asperata

Binomial name
- Picea asperata Mast.

Varieties
- See text

= Picea asperata =

Species of conifer

Picea asperata (dragon spruce; Chinese: 雲杉) is a species of spruce in the family Pinaceae. It is native to western China, from eastern Qinghai, southern Gansu and southwestern Shaanxi south to western Sichuan.

== Description ==
It is a medium-sized evergreen tree growing to 25–40 m tall, and with a trunk diameter of up to 1.5 m. The shoots are orange-brown, with scattered pubescence. The leaves are needle-like, 1–2.5 cm long, rhombic in cross-section, greyish-green to bluish-green with conspicuous stomatal lines. The cones are cylindric-conic, 6–15 cm long and 2–3 cm broad, maturing pale brown 5–7 months after pollination, and have stiff, rounded to bluntly pointed scales.

== Varieties ==
It is a variable species with several varieties listed. These were first described as distinct species (and are still so treated by some authors), although they differ only in minor details, and some may not prove to be distinct at all if a larger population is examined:

- Picea asperata var. asperata. Cones 6–12 cm; cone scales with a rounded apex.
- Picea asperata var. aurantiaca (syn. P. aurantiaca). Shoots orange.
- Picea asperata var. heterolepis (syn. P. heterolepis). Shoots hairless; cone scales with a rhombic apex.
- Picea asperata var. ponderosa. Cones large, 12–15 cm.
- Picea asperata var. retroflexa (syn. P. retroflexa). Shoots yellowish.

== Conservation ==
The species is currently not listed as threatened, but recently population numbers have been declining due to deforestation caused by the Chinese logging industry.

== Uses ==
Picea asperata is occasionally grown as an ornamental tree in Europe and North America. It is also used in the production of stringed instruments.

== Gallery ==
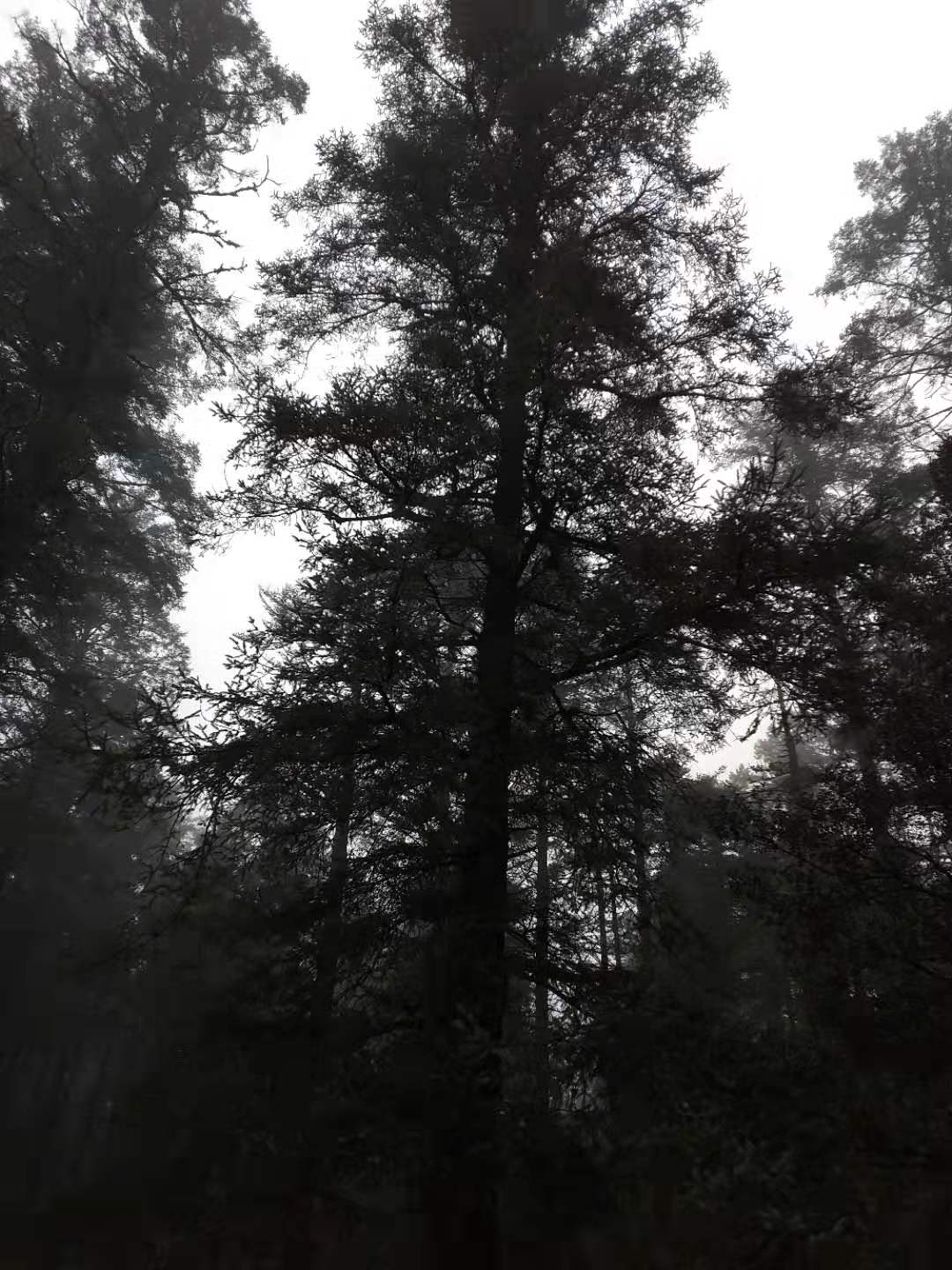
Photo taken in Yulong Snow Mountain, Yunnan, China.。

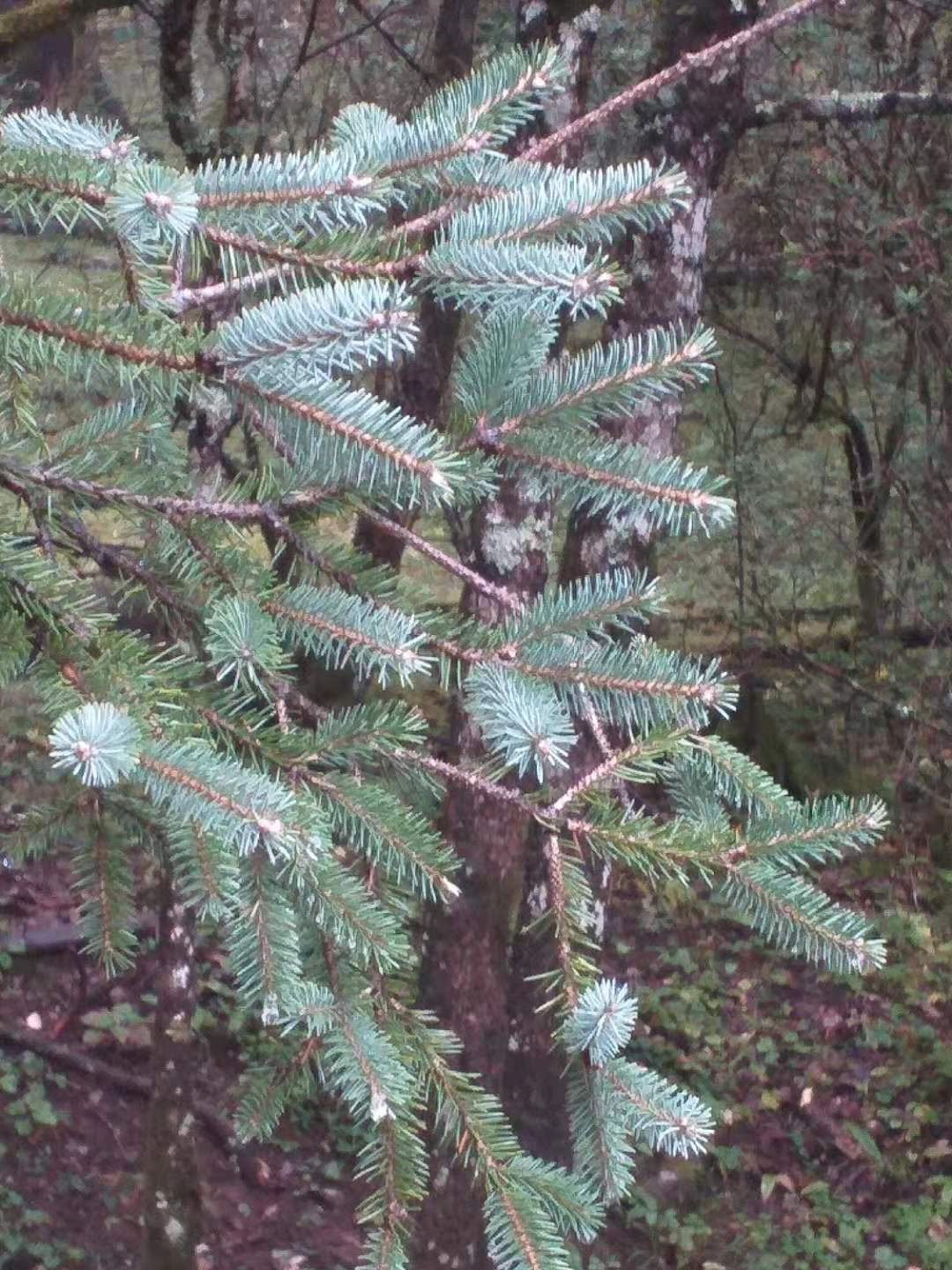
Photo taken in Yulong Snow Mountain, Yunnan, China.。

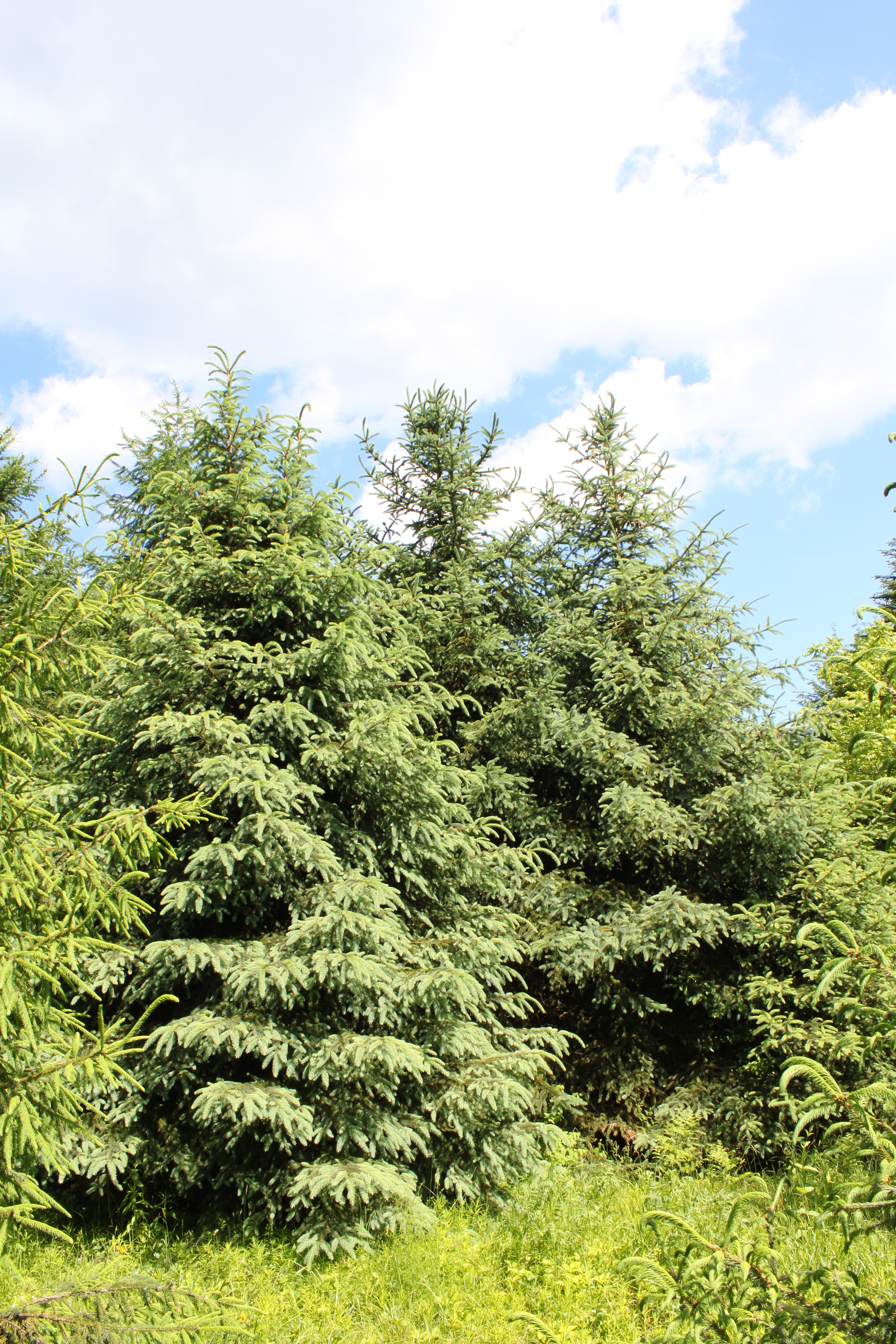
Rogów Arboretum, Poland
