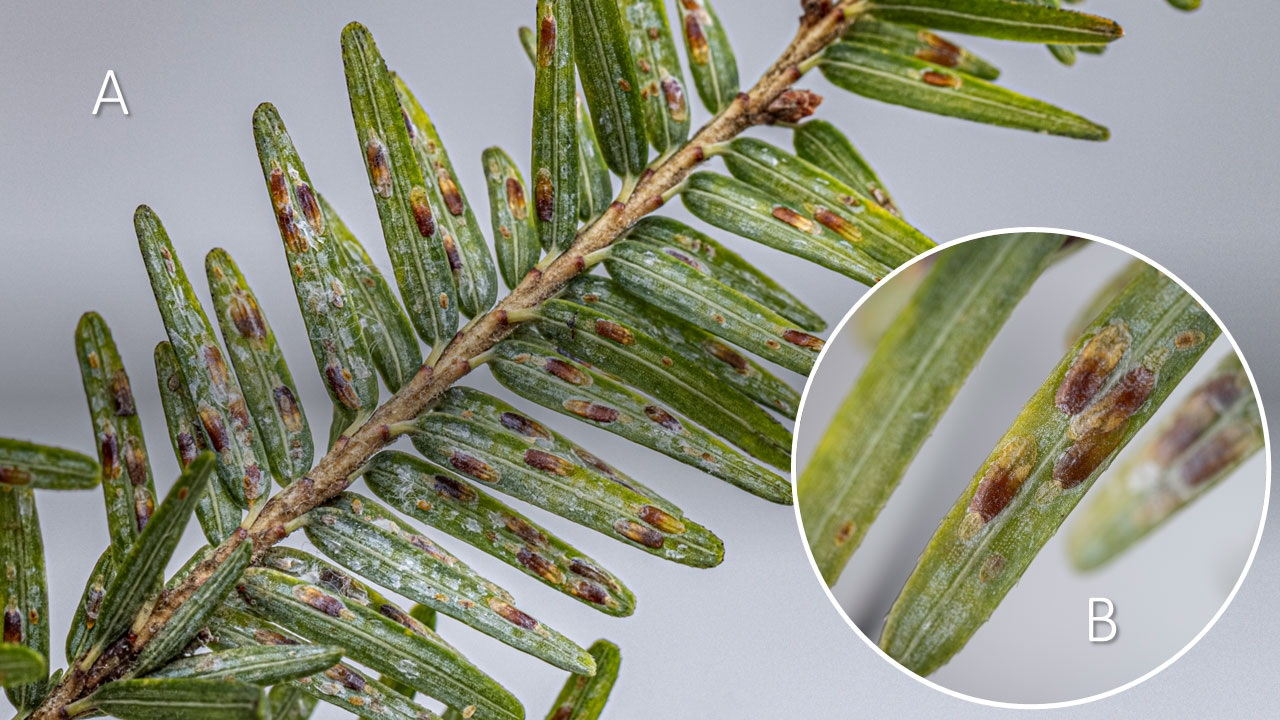
- A) underside of hemlock leaves infested by Fiorinia externa B) close up

Scientific classification
- Domain: Eukaryota
- Kingdom: Animalia
- Phylum: Arthropoda
- Class: Insecta
- Order: Hemiptera
- Suborder: Sternorrhyncha
- Family: Diaspididae
- Genus: Fiorinia
- Species: F. externa

Binomial name
- Fiorinia externa Ferris, 1942

= Fiorinia externa =

Species of scale insect

Fiorinia externa, the elongate hemlock scale, was accidentally introduced into North America from Japan and is now established in most parts of the north-eastern U.S. It has become a serious pest of hemlock (Tsuga) and some related conifers from the family Pinaceae. Dense colonies of the scale insect result in yellowing, shedding of leaves, dieback and occasional tree death.

== Distribution ==
Fiorinia externa is native to Japan and southern China. It was first reported on Tsuga from New York state in 1908. Compared to other invasive insects, it has spread slowly across the north-eastern U.S. and has reached Georgia in the south, as well as Michigan, Kentucky and Tennessee further west.

While F. externa has not been confirmed to be established in other areas, it is regarded as being of quarantine concern. For example, it has been recorded from other parts of North America like California and Florida on host cuttings. In England, it was reported on a single fir tree imported from the U.S., but subsequently died out on that tree.

== Description ==
The adult female of Fiorinia externa is about 1 mm long. The scale cover of the second instar female is elongated, around 1.5 mm long and has a yellowish-brown, orange-brown or reddish-brown colour. The scale cover of immature males is white. The eggs and crawlers are yellowish and when the crawlers settle, they excrete white wax filaments which may be abundant and give the infested hemlock leaves a whitish appearance.

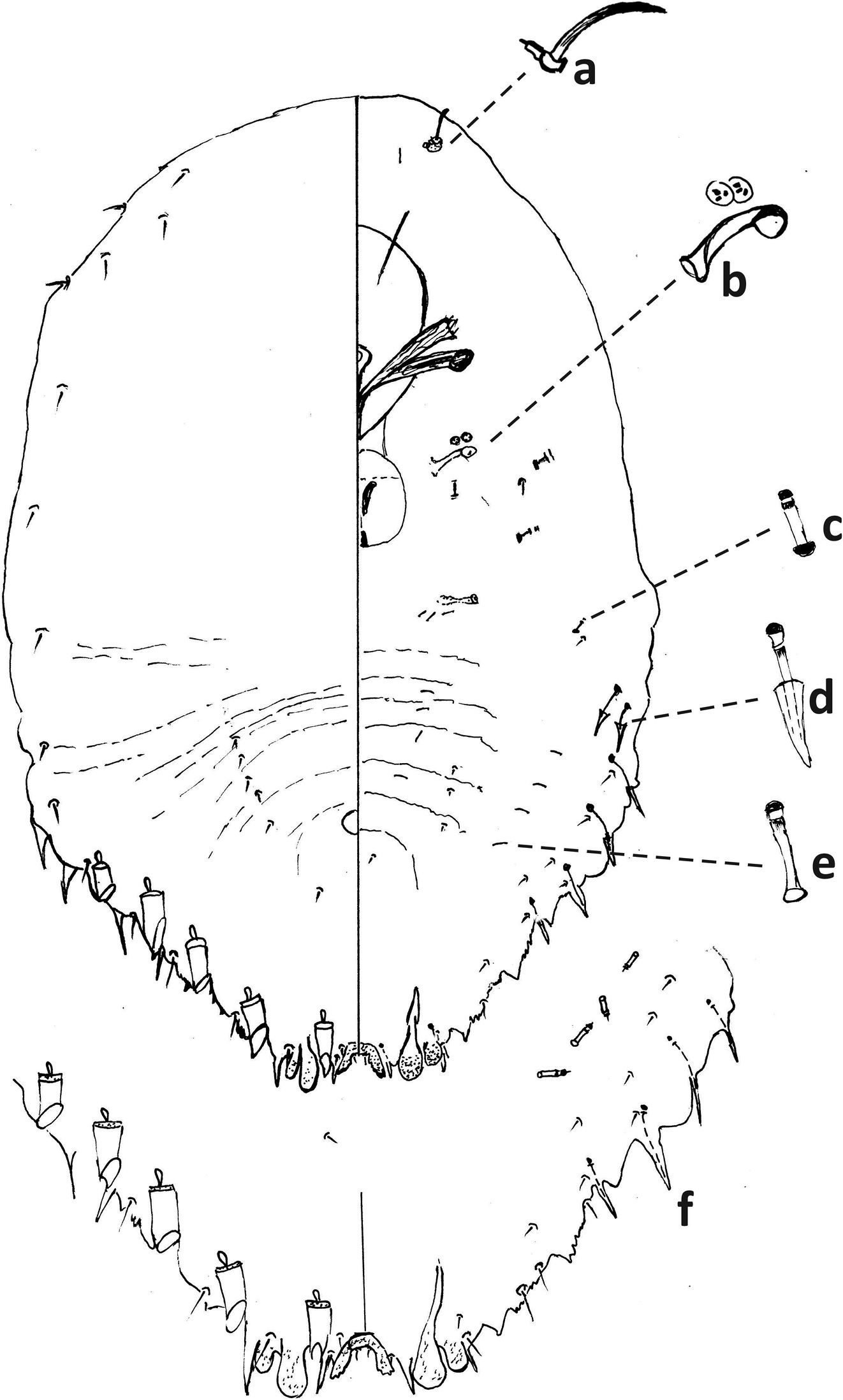
Second-instar female of Fiorinia externa - a) antenna; b) anterior spiracle; c) microduct with sclerotized orifice; d) large gland spine; e) small microduct; f) details of pygidium.

== Biology ==
While more than 50 host plants from 3 conifer families and 9 genera have been reported, the main host plants are hemlock (Tsuga), fir (Abies) and spruce (Picea) species. In North America the most common hosts are Tsuga canadensis, Tsuga caroliniana, Tsuga diversifolia, Abies amabilis, Abies fargesii, Abies veitchii and Picea pungens.

Like other Fiorinia species, the elongate hemlock scale is a "pupillarial" scale, meaning that the adult female remains within the second-instar exuviae. In North America, the overwintering stages are the eggs within the pupillarial female or the fully mature adult females. The eggs hatch in spring and the crawlers migrate to new needles of the same host plant, or may be carried over longer distances by the wind or by birds. There may be one or two generations per year. If there is only one generation, a second one might be started, but with many individuals not surviving the winter.

== Importance ==
While Fiorinia externa usually does not kill hemlock trees, the damage caused by heavy infestations can be serious, resulting in yellowing, premature leaf senescence, branch dieback, thinning of the crown and stunting of the host tree.

== Management and biocontrol ==
Sprays with mineral oil (horticultural oil) or the use of systemic pesticides by trunk injection or soil drenches can control the elongate hemlock scale.

In North America, natural enemies of F. externa are not very efficient in suppressing the scale populations compared to Japan and as a result, the scale populations in Japan are much smaller. The polyphagous Encarsia citrina is the most important parasitoid of F. externa in North America, but its population cycle is poorly synchronized with that of F. externa, making it often ineffective. In Japan, Encarsia citrina is also an important parasitoid of F. externa, but its population dynamic is well synchronized with the population of the elongate hemlock scale. In addition, various other parasitoids were recorded in Japan.

Some research has been directed at trying to understand the differences between North America and Japan in the population dynamics of F. externa and E. citrina. It appears that an important reason for the asynchronous populations of scale insects and parasitoids in North America is the overlapping generations of the scale insect which is not seen in Japan. Differences in host quality between Japan and North America could also be a factor.
