= Tsuga ulleungensis =

- A cultivated specimen in California

Scientific classification
- Kingdom: Plantae
- Clade: Tracheophytes
- Clade: Gymnosperms
- Division: Pinophyta
- Class: Pinopsida
- Order: Pinales
- Family: Pinaceae
- Genus: Tsuga
- Species: T. ulleungensis

Binomial name
- Tsuga ulleungensis G.P.Holman, Del Tredici, Havill, N.S.Lee & C.S.Campb.

Species of conifer

Tsuga ulleungensis, also known as the Ulleungdo hemlock (Korean: 울릉솔송나무), is a species of conifer in the pine family, Pinaceae. It is endemic to Ulleungdo, a volcanic island off of the eastern coast of the Korean Peninsula. The trees were formerly identified as southern Japanese hemlock (Tsuga sieboldii), but genetic, morphological and phenological studies showed the Ulleungudo population to be distinct. The species was formally described in 2017 by Garth P. Holman, Peter Del Tredici, Nathan P. Havill, Nam Sook Lee and Christopher S. Campbell.
