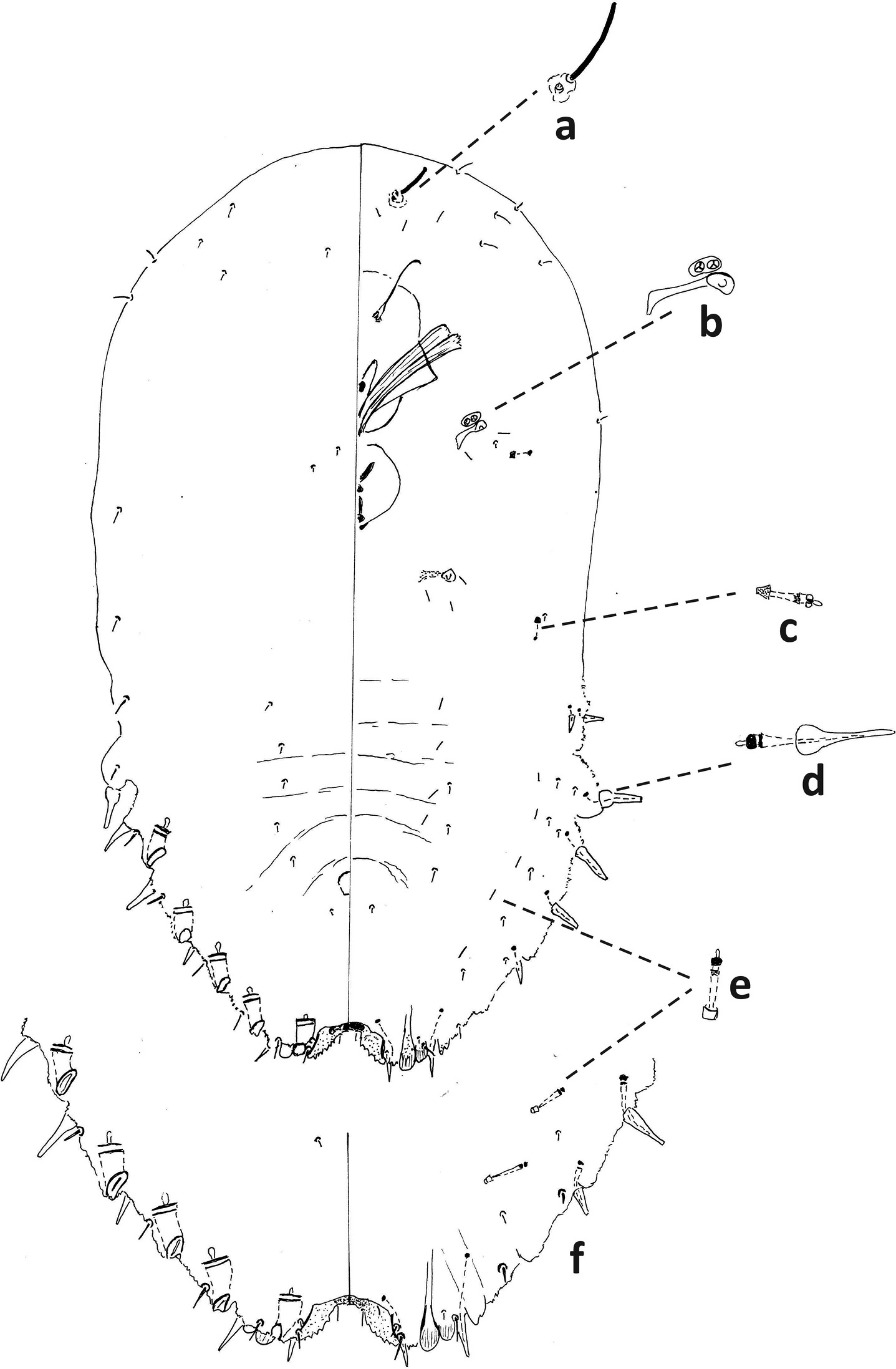
- Fiorinia fioriniae 2nd instar female - a) antenna; b) anterior spiracle c) microduct with sclerotized orifice; d) large gland spine; e) large microduct; f) enlargement of pygidium.

Scientific classification
- Kingdom: Animalia
- Phylum: Arthropoda
- Clade: Pancrustacea
- Class: Insecta
- Order: Hemiptera
- Suborder: Sternorrhyncha
- Family: Diaspididae
- Subfamily: Diaspidinae
- Tribe: Diaspidini
- Subtribe: Fioriniina
- Genus: Fiorinia; Targioni Tozzetti, 1869

= Fiorinia =

Genus of scale insects

Fiorinia is a genus of armored scale insects (family Diaspididae) with around 70 species. The species are widely distributed around the world. However, the large majority of them are found in southern Asia. They infest woody plants like forest or crop trees, palm trees and shrubs. Several species are invasive and these are mainly polyphagous species which have spread with the trade of ornamentals. For example, 7 species have been introduced into North America.

Type species: Fiorinia pellucida Targioni Tozzetti, 1868, a synonym of Fiorinia fioriniae.

== Distribution ==
The large majority of species can be found in tropical and subtropical parts of Asia and the Pacific Islands. In other regions, species of Fiorinia have been frequently reported as being introduced or being intercepted by quarantine. This applies, for example, to all species of Fiorinia recorded in the United States and in the U.K. Some invasive species like F. fioriniae or F. phantasma have reached a wide distribution around the world. Other species like F. externa are also invasive, but have spread rather slowly.

== Description ==
The species of Fiorinia are "pupillarial" scales, meaning the scale cover of females is formed by the second-instar female and the adult female remains inside the second-instar exuviae. Apart from this feature, the genus is similar morphologically to the genus Pseudaulacaspis, with small differences in the marginal gland spines and the dorsal macroducts. Both genera together with several others form the subtribe Fioriniina. The relationship within this subtribe has been established by a molecular phylogenetic analysis.

Since species are often polyphagous and have a similar appearance, it is usually not possible to identify a species reliably by the scale cover and the host plant. For example, in North America Fiorinia phantasma is very similar externally to Fiorinia fioriniae and both commonly infest ornamental palms. Therefore, a microscopic examination of morphological details with the help of a slide mount is required for reliable identification, in this case even for routine field surveys. However, for surveys a temporary slide mount may be sufficient. Identification keys are available for some countries like the U.S. and the U.K.

The scale cover of Fiorinia species is elongated and typically has a length of around 1.2–2.0 mm (0.047–0.079 in). The cover of the females often has a brownish colour, that of males is usually white. The individual species have to be identified by morphological details of the adult female and/or the 2nd instar female, including the general shape, the morphology of the posterior end, the pygidium, the antennae, as well as the number and arrangements of macroducts, microducts and gland spines. Like in other scale insects, males resemble tiny wasps and have only one pair of wings.

== Biology ==
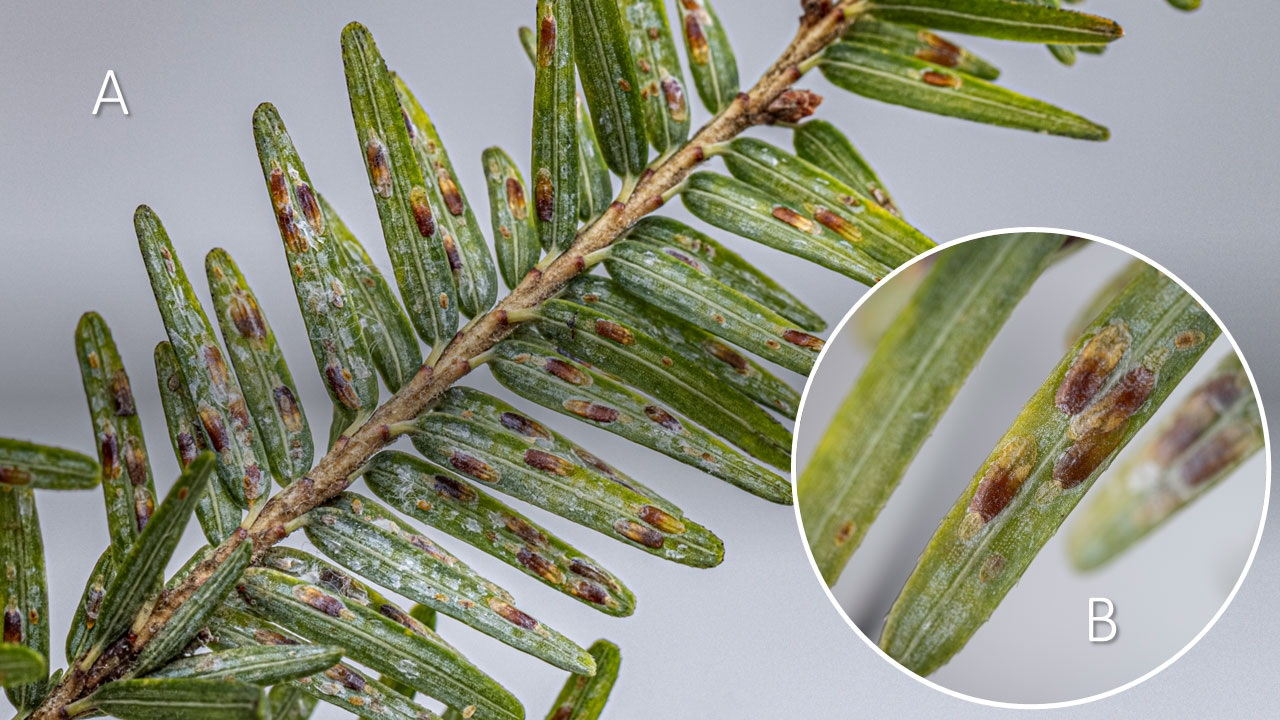
A) underside of hemlock leaf infested by Fiorinia externa B) close up

The host range typically includes a number of plant families and several species are highly polyphagous. For example, 54 plant families and 119 plant genera are listed as hosts for Fiorinia fioriniae. The three main groups of host plants are 1) broad-leaved trees and shrubs, 2) conifers and 3) palm trees. The scales usually colonize the underside of the host leaves. Even the polyphagous species have certain preferences, for example Fiorinia fioriniae is most common on ornamental palm trees and avocado and is regarded as a pest on these.

The life cycle of Fiorinia females involves the egg stage, the crawler stage, the second-instar stage and the adult. Males have two additional instars. Like in other scale insects, only the crawler stage is mobile, moving to other parts of the host plant or migrating longer distances through wind dispersal or on birds. However, the most important means of spread over long distances is by human transport of infested host plants.

== Importance ==
Outbreaks have been reported for invasive Fiorinia species. These cause yellowing of the infested leaves and occasionally wilting of the host plants, up to plant death. For example, significant damage has been reported on hemlock by Fiorinia externa or on palm trees by Fiorinia phantasma.

Several species are regarded as agricultural or forest pests. These include:

- Fiorinia externa, the elongate hemlock scale, a species native to eastern Asia that has been accidentally introduced into eastern North America, where it infests hemlock trees (Tsuga) and other conifers.
- Fiorinia fioriniae, the palm fiorinia scale, a widely distributed polyphagous pest of palm trees and ornamentals.
- Fiorinia phantasma, the phantasma scale, a pest of palm trees, other ornamentals and some fruit trees which is found in various regions.
- Fiorinia theae, the tea scale, a widely distributed and polyphagous species which infests, apart from tea, various wild and cultivated shrubs and trees like citrus and holly (Ilex) species.

== List of species ==
The genus includes around 70 species. The following list includes the more common species, based on the number of articles cited by ScaleNet:

- Fiorinia arengae
- Fiorinia distinctissima
- Fiorinia drimydis
- Fiorinia euryae
- Fiorinia expansa
- Fiorinia externa
- Fiorinia ficicola
- Fiorinia fioriniae
- Fiorinia formosensis
- Fiorinia horii
- Fiorinia japonica
- Fiorinia juniperi
- Fiorinia linderae
- Fiorinia minor
- Fiorinia phantasma
- Fiorinia phoenicis
- Fiorinia pinicola
- Fiorinia proboscidaria
- Fiorinia quercifolii
- Fiorinia rhododendri
- Fiorinia saprosmae
- Fiorinia smilaceti
- Fiorinia taiwana
- Fiorinia theae
- Fiorinia turpiniae
- Fiorinia vacciniae
