= Tsuga × jeffreyi =

Scientific classification
- Kingdom: Plantae
- Clade: Tracheophytes
- Clade: Gymnosperms
- Division: Pinophyta
- Class: Pinopsida
- Order: Pinales
- Family: Pinaceae
- Genus: Tsuga
- Species: T. × jeffreyi

Binomial name
- Tsuga × jeffreyi (A.Henry) A.Henry

Hybrid species of plant

Tsuga × jeffreyi is a naturally-occurring hybrid plant species. Its parents are Tsuga heterophylla and Tsuga mertensiana. It is native to the Pacific Northwest: British Columbia and Washington.
