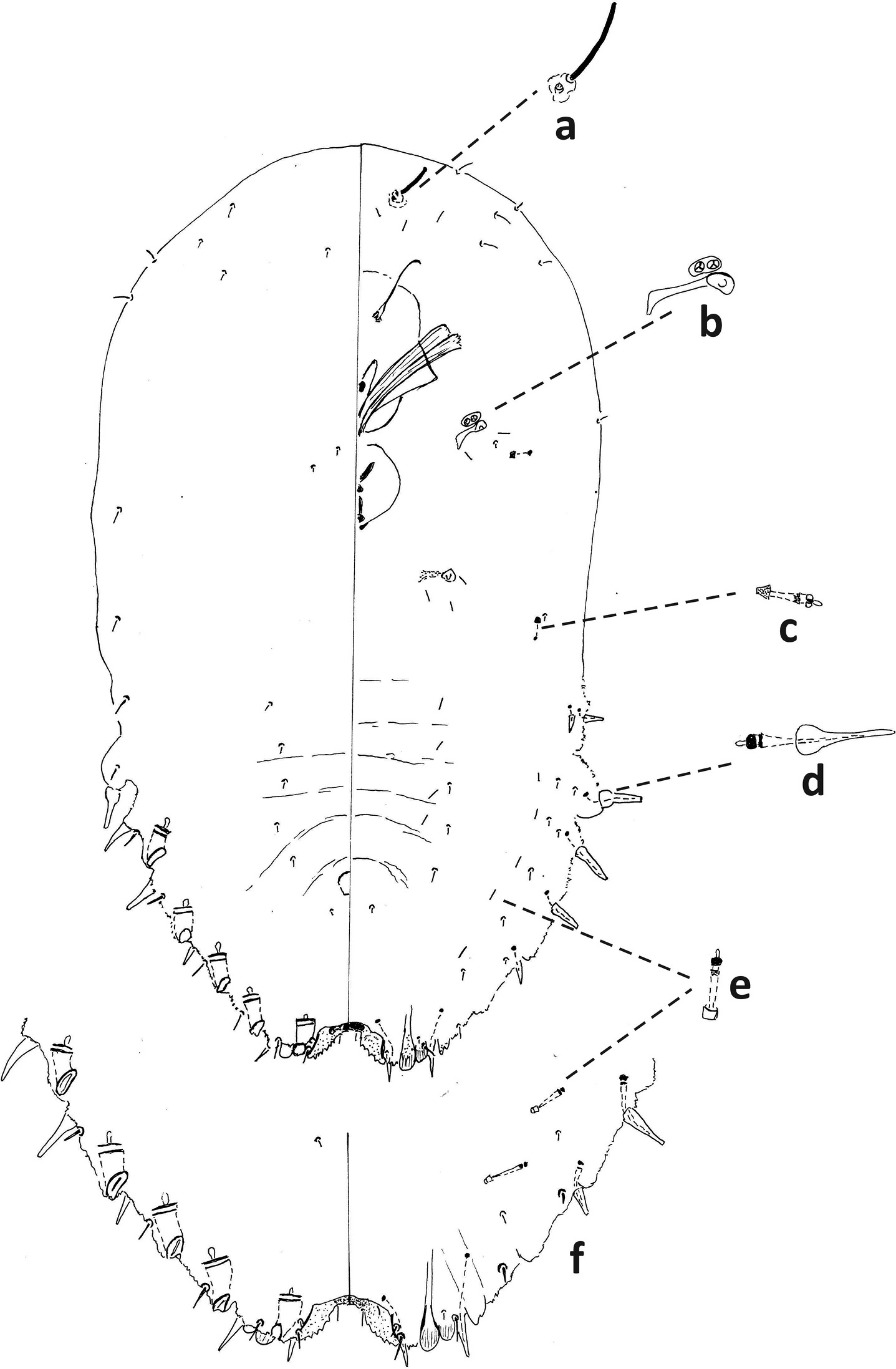
- Fiorinia fioriniae 2nd instar female - a) antenna; b) anterior spiracle c) microduct with sclerotized orifice; d) large gland spine; e) large microduct; f) enlargement of pygidium.

Scientific classification
- Domain: Eukaryota
- Kingdom: Animalia
- Phylum: Arthropoda
- Class: Insecta
- Order: Hemiptera
- Suborder: Sternorrhyncha
- Family: Diaspididae
- Genus: Fiorinia
- Species: F. fioriniae

Binomial name
- Fiorinia fioriniae (Targioni Tozzetti, 1867)

Synonyms
- Diaspis fioriniae Targioni Tozzetti 1867; Fiorinia pellucida Targioni Tozzetti, 1868; Fiorinia camelliae Comstock 1881; Fiorinia palmae Green 1896

= Fiorinia fioriniae =

Species of scale insect

Fiorinia fioriniae is a highly polyphagous scale insect and widely distributed around the world, being found in Asia, Australia/Pacific, Africa, Europe and the Americas. Its vernacular names include fiorinia scale, palm fiorinia scale, and avocado scale. It can cause significant damage to palms, avocado as well as other fruit and ornamental trees. It has been cited as one of two species of Fiorinia in a list of 43 "principle armoured scale pests of the world".

== Distribution ==
Fiorinia fioriniae has been suggested to be native to Asia, where it is found from western Asia (e.g. Turkey and Israel) to far eastern Asia (China and Japan), and from Indonesia in the south to Russia in the north. Outside Asia, it has been recorded from many tropical and subtropical countries and from greenhouses in temperate regions. The distribution range includes various Pacific Islands, parts of Australia, as well as parts of Africa and Europe, in the north up to France, Germany, Ireland, and the United Kingdom. In the Americas it is widespread in the U.S., including eastern, central and western States, Central America, several Caribbean Islands and South America (Brazil, Argentina, Peru).

== Description ==
The scale cover of Fiorinia fioriniae is elongated, around 1.0 to 1.5 mm long, light brown, yellowish brown or orange-brown with a median, longitudinal ridge. Males have a white scale cover, but some populations like those in North America are parthenogenetic and males may be absent or very rare. Heavily infested leaves show some white wax excretion. A description of the first instar female nymphs (crawlers) has been provided together with a key to distinguish it from those of other North American Fiorinia species.

F. fioriniae is similar morphologically to several other species of Fiorinia. In North America, it can be easily confused with Fiorinia phantasma, especially since they are both common on ornamental palms. Relevant keys need to be consulted to distinguish both species. For example, adult females of F. phantasma have an inter-antennal process which is absent in F. fioriniae.

== Biology ==
Fiorinia fioriniae is highly polyphagous, with ScaleNet listing species from 54 plant families and from 119 plant genera as hosts. The most important host plants are species of palms (various ornamental palms as well as coconut palms, date palms and sabal palms), fruit trees like avocado, citrus or mango, and a large number of ornamental trees or shrubs. The underside of the leaves are infested. The most significant damage by F. fioriniae has been reported from avocado, palm trees, tea and several ornamentals like Ruscus hypoglossum or camellias. Heavy infestations result in chlorosis and sometimes defoliation. Infestations of avocado fruits reduces their quality.

In tropical regions, F. fioriniae reproduces throughout the year. In cooler regions, egg laying and emergence of the first generation starts in spring. As the seasons progress, populations might overlap and there are several generations per year. As with other scale insects, dispersion occurs during the crawler stage (the first instar), as well as during human transport of host plant material. It is often intercepted by quarantine.

== Natural enemies ==
There is little information on parasitoids and predators. Several species of Encarsia like Encarsia lounsburyi and Encarsia citrina have been reported as parasitoids of Fiorinia fioriniae. In addition, Aphytis chrysomphali, Pteroptrix lauri, Mymaridae and Signiphora species have been mentioned as parasitoids of F. fioriniae. Reported predators include various thrips and ladybugs.
