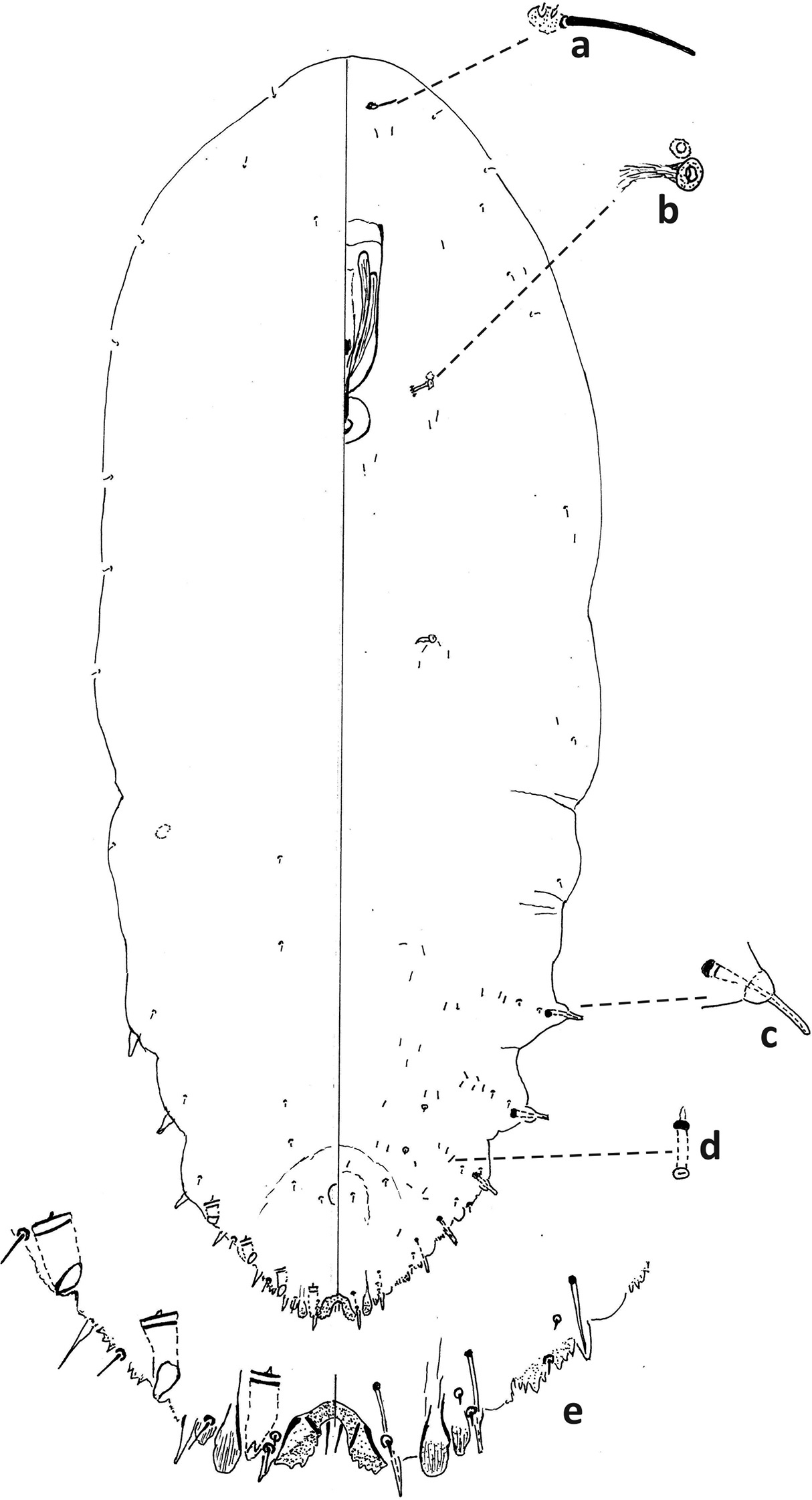
- Fiorinia theae 2nd instar female - a) antenna; b) anterior spiracle c) large gland spine; d) small microduct; e) enlargement of pygidium.

Scientific classification
- Domain: Eukaryota
- Kingdom: Animalia
- Phylum: Arthropoda
- Class: Insecta
- Order: Hemiptera
- Suborder: Sternorrhyncha
- Family: Diaspididae
- Genus: Fiorinia
- Species: F. theae

Binomial name
- Fiorinia theae Green, 1900

= Fiorinia theae =

Species of scale insect

Fiorinia theae, the tea scale, is a polyphagous scale insect which is native to Asia and has been introduced into the Americas. It is widely distributed on both continents, especially in warmer regions. Apart from tea (Camellia sinensis), the host plants include a range of trees and shrubs, both ornamentals and crops. For example, other Camellia species, Citrus or Ilex (holly) species are part of the host range. Infested plants turn yellow and might die after heavy infestation.

== Distribution ==
Fiorinia theae was originally described from tea plants in India and has been recorded also from various other countries in southern Asia, ranging from Sri Lanka in the west to the Philippines, Taiwan and southern China in the east.

It was introduced into the U.S. in the beginning of the 20th century and in 1908 was already recorded as a pest of ornamental camellias in South Carolina. It is now widely distributed in the Americas and has been recorded in most eastern and south-central states of the U.S., up to Texas and Kansas in the west and Indiana, Pennsylvania and Massachusetts in the north. There are also reports from California. It is further found in Central America and in Argentina in South America.

== Description ==
The first instar larvae (crawlers) of Fiorinia theae are yellowish. The 2nd instar female is elongated with a dark brown scale cover, between 1.0 and 1.5 mm long. Immature males are smaller, less elongated and have a white scale cover. During heavy infestations, white wax secretions become abundant, giving the infected leaf a whitish appearance. Like in other scale insects, adult males are wasp-like with 1 pair of wings, one pair of halteres, and non-functional mouthparts.

== Biology ==
Fiorinia theae is a polyphagous scale insect of woody plants, infesting the underside of the leaves. Apart from tea plants in Asia, ornamental Camellia and Ilex species are the main hosts. Many other plants are infested less regularly. ScaleNet lists more than 20 genera from 18 plant families as hosts, including various crops and ornamental trees.

The development time and number of generations per year depends on the temperature. For example, in Florida, there are multiple, overlapping generations and all stages can be found throughout the year. In contrast, there are fewer generations in the northern states. The eggs laid by female scales hatch after 1–3 weeks and the crawlers disperse by moving to other parts of the host plant or spread by wind. After about one week, they become sessile, start feeding and after 10 more days moult to the 2nd instar stage. Second-instars start to develop a scale cover. Female scales moult only one more time and the adults remain within the second-instar exuviae. Male scales moult 3 more times. The total development time from egg hatching to adult females lasts 3–4 weeks. The development of males is slightly longer. There are several generations per year in the southern U.S. with one generation lasting 45 to 65 days.

== Importance ==
In North America, ornamental Camellia and Ilex species experience the most serious damage from Fiorinia theae infestations. These plants are widely used in landscaping and the tea scale is a key pest of ornamentals in the south-eastern U.S. In other regions, damage on tea, citrus, dogwood, bottlebrush, kumquat, mango, and olive trees can be also significant. Extensive infestations by the scale insect causes yellowing of the leaves, premature leaf drop and branch dieback, up to death of the host plant.

However, there is a range of susceptibility among ornamental Camellia and Ilex species. For example, in the south-eastern U.S. several non-native species like Camellia japonica or Ilex cornuta are highly susceptible to the scale insect and are often heavily infested. On the other hand, some native species like Ilex vomitoria and Ilex opaca are fairy resistant.

== Management and biocontrol ==
Fiorinia theae infests the lower leaf surface of its host plant, making spraying with pesticides less effective. In addition, chemical pesticides can harm natural enemies and might not be able to penetrate the hard scale cover. The use of horticultural oils is less destructive to beneficial insects, but might not be able to control heavy infestations. Pruning of camellias in spring before the application of pesticides has been suggested for making these more effective.

In south-eastern North America, several wasps like Aphytis diaspidis have been recorded as parasitoids of F. theae. A variety of natural enemies has been reported from India. In 1976, Aphytis theae was released in Florida from India, but did not survive the winter.
