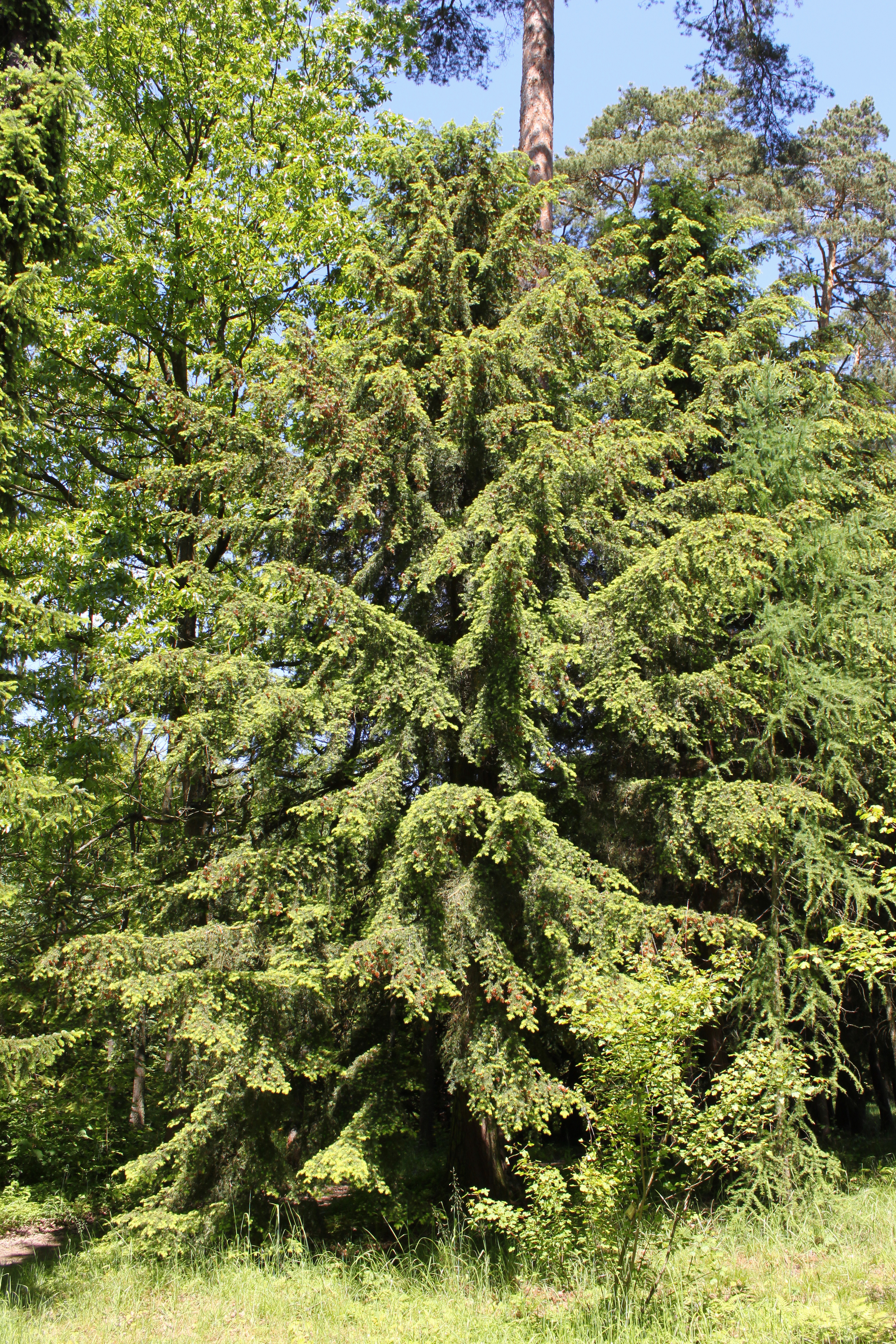
- Habit, Arboretum in Rogów, Poland

Conservation status
- Near Threatened (IUCN 3.1)

- Vulnerable (NatureServe)

Scientific classification
- Kingdom: Plantae
- Clade: Tracheophytes
- Clade: Gymnosperms
- Division: Pinophyta
- Class: Pinopsida
- Order: Pinales
- Family: Pinaceae
- Genus: Tsuga
- Species: T. caroliniana

Binomial name
- Tsuga caroliniana Engelm.
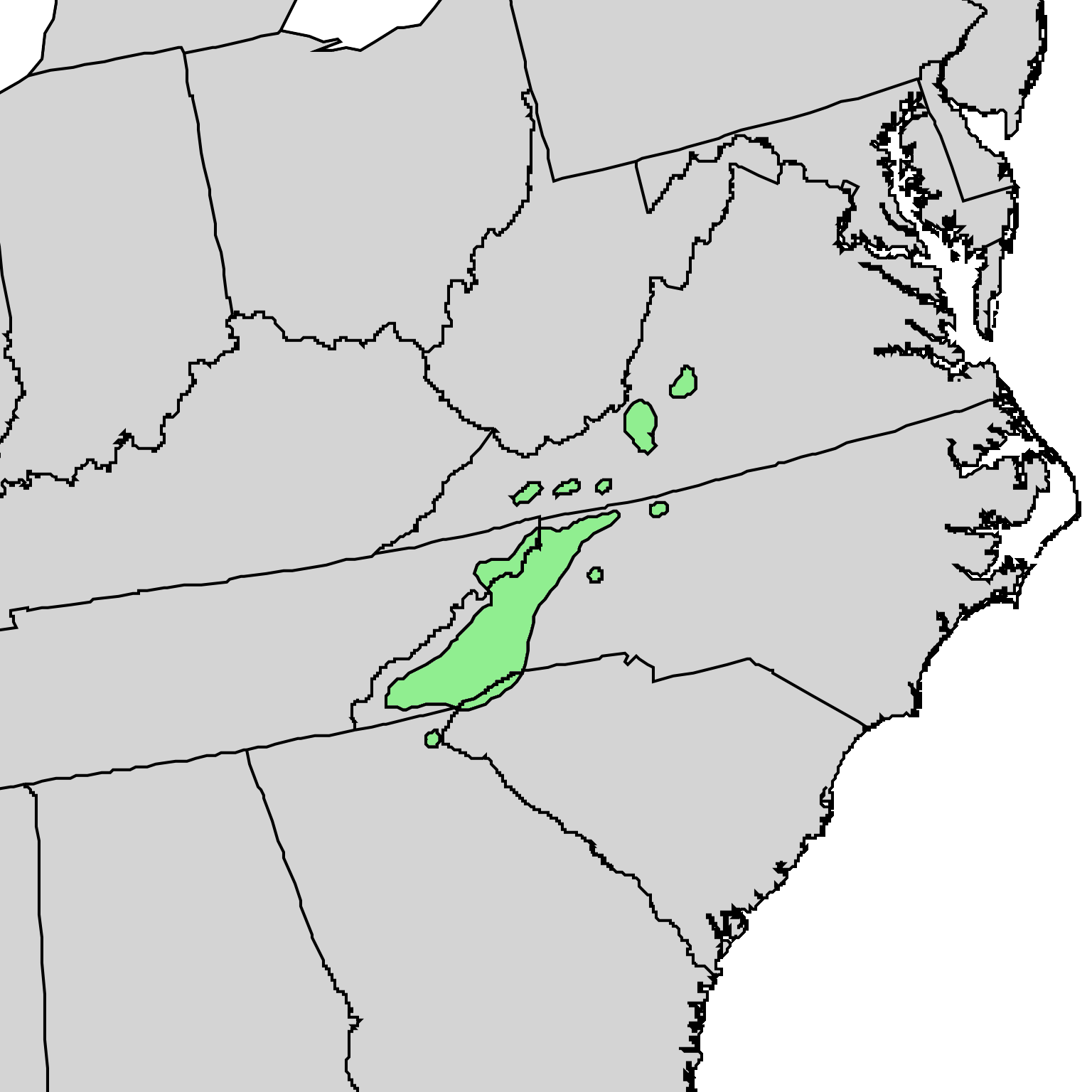

= Tsuga caroliniana =

Carolina hemlock

Species of conifer

Tsuga caroliniana, the Carolina hemlock, is a species of conifer in the pine family, Pinaceae, endemic to the southern Appalachian Mountains of the United States. As of 2023, it is under review for listing under the Endangered Species Act of 1973.

== Distribution and habitat ==
Carolina hemlock is native to the Appalachian Mountains in southwest Virginia, western North Carolina, extreme northeast Georgia, northwest South Carolina, and eastern Tennessee. Its habitat is on rocky mountain slopes at elevations of 700–1,200 m (2,300–3,900 ft). The optimal growing condition is a partly shady area with moist but well-drained soil in a cool climate. There is a small, self-sustaining population of Carolina hemlock in the Virginia Kendall State Park Historic District of the Cuyahoga Valley National Park in northeast Ohio planted originally as part of reforestation efforts during the park's development in the 1930s and 40s.

== Description ==
It is a coniferous tree growing up to 30 m (98 ft), exceptionally to 34 m (112 ft) tall and 110 cm (43 in) in trunk diameter in climax forest conditions. The crown is compact and pyramidal, growing up to 8 m (26 ft) wide. The bark is thick and reddish-brown, and becomes fissured between scaly ridges. The branches are stout and usually horizontal, but often slightly drooping. The shoots are red-brown to orange-brown, and finely hairy. The leaves are 5–20 mm (0.20–0.79 in) long and 1.8–2 mm (0.071–0.079 in) broad, flattened, not tapering toward their ends, with a rounded or slightly notched apex; they radiate outward in all directions from the twigs, and smell of tangerine if crushed. They are glossy dark green above and paler on the underside, with two white stomatal bands. The female cones are 2–4 cm (0.79–1.57 in) long, green, maturing light to mid-brown 6–7 months after pollination. When fully open, their scales are positioned at a right angle or reflexed to the central axis.

== Threats ==
The hemlock woolly adelgid (Adelges tsugae), an adelgid introduced to the United States from Asia in 1924, threatens Carolina hemlock, which is as susceptible as the related eastern hemlock. The trees may also be attacked by elongate hemlock scale (Fiorinia externa).

== Horticulture ==
Carolina hemlock is used more often as an ornamental tree than for timber production, due to its overall rarity. In landscaping, it is similar in appearance to eastern hemlock, but the Carolina hemlock has a deep taproot, compared with the shallow, aggressive roots of eastern hemlock. This means shrubs and other plants can be grown more easily under Carolina hemlock.

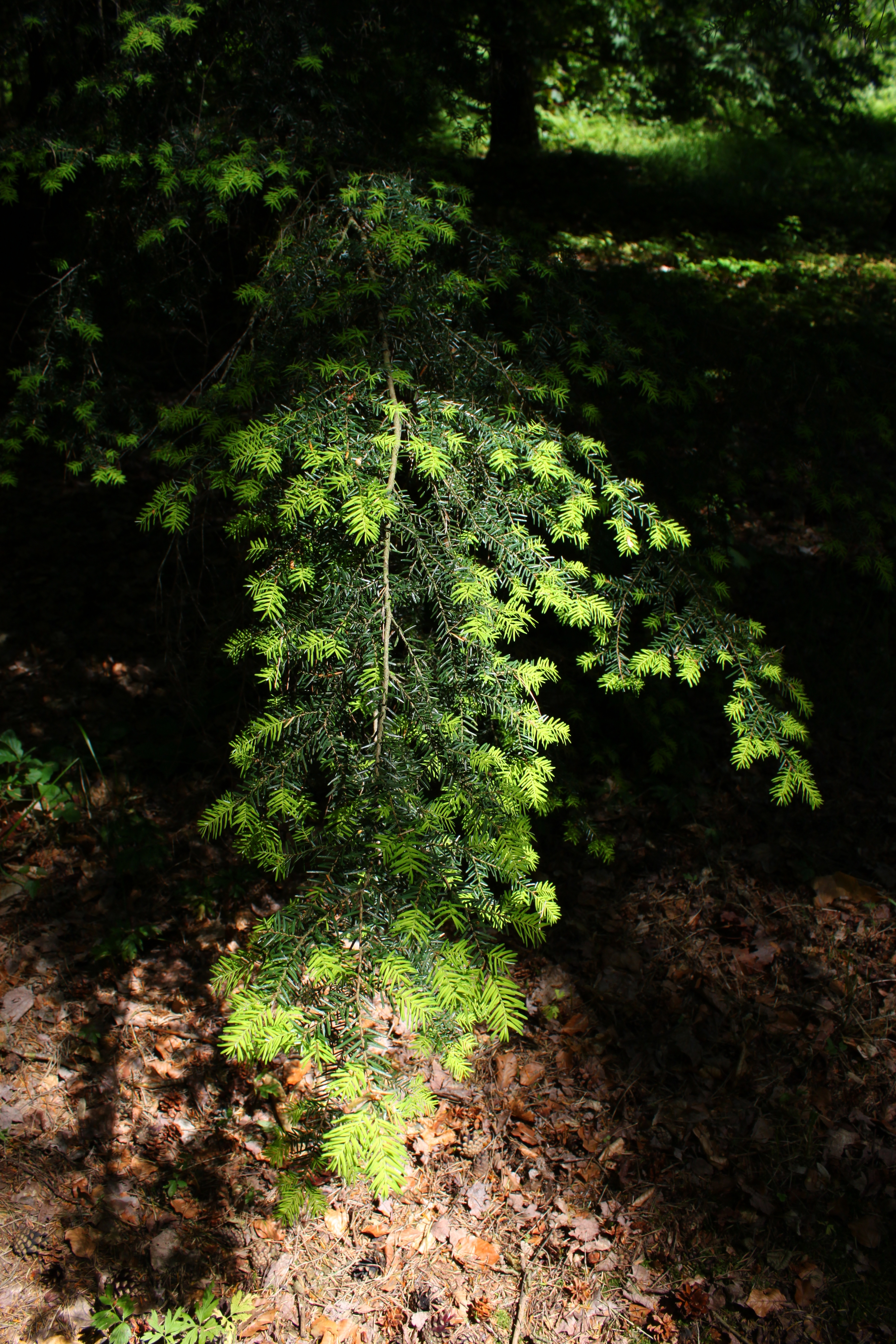
Foliage, Rogów Arboretum, Poland
