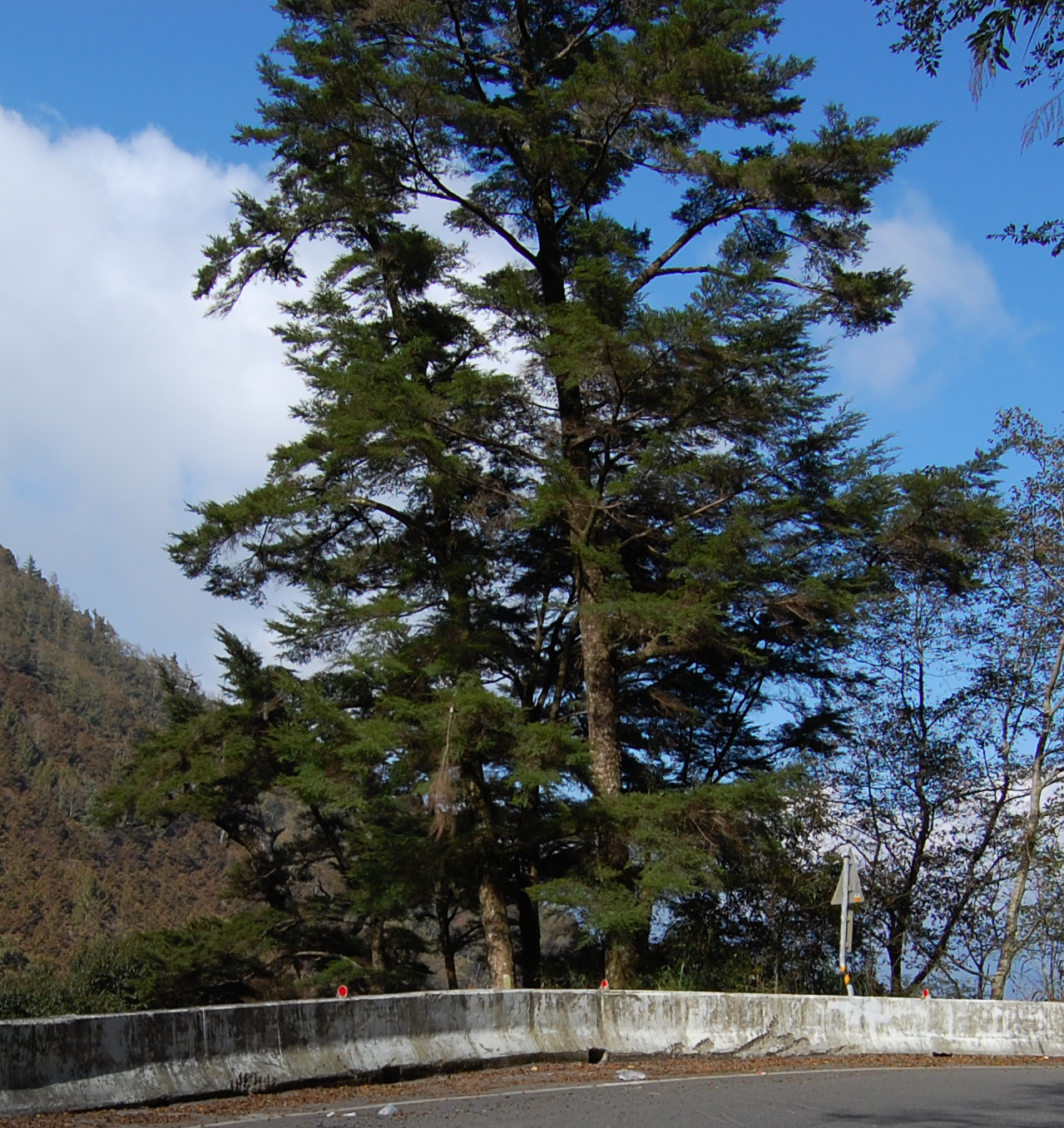

Conservation status
- Least Concern (IUCN 3.1)

Scientific classification
- Kingdom: Plantae
- Clade: Tracheophytes
- Clade: Gymnosperms
- Division: Pinophyta
- Class: Pinopsida
- Order: Pinales
- Family: Pinaceae
- Genus: Tsuga
- Species: T. chinensis

Binomial name
- Tsuga chinensis (Franch.) Pritzel ex Diels.

= Tsuga chinensis =

Chinese hemlock

Species of conifer

Tsuga chinensis, commonly referred to as the Taiwan or Chinese hemlock, is a coniferous tree species in the pine family, Pinaceae, native to China, Taiwan, and Vietnam. The tree is quite variable and has many recognised varieties, though some are also maintained to be separate species by certain authorities. The tree was recently discovered in the mountains of northern Vietnam, making that the southernmost extension of its range.

== Description ==
Tsuga chinensis is a large tree with bark that is a blackish brown in colour. The scaly bark has irregular longitudinal breaks, and lenticels that are very inconspicuous. The outer bark is about 6 mm thick with alternating tiered layers of pale yellowish brown corky bark, and brown lignified fibrous bark. The newly formed periderm is a purplish red. The inner bark is about 4 to 5 mm (0.16 to 0.20 inches) thick and pale reddish brown in colour. It is fibrous in texture with minute, almost inconspicuous sclereid, or stone cell groups. The cambium as well as the newly formed phloem are nearly inconspicuous. Freshly cut wood is a pale yellowish white with inconspicuous wood rays.

The branchlets that have leaf-cushions. The leaves are arranged spirally in a manner more or less 2-ranked. They are linear and flat in shape and olive green in colour. The upper side of the leaf is grooved and keeled, while the underside has 2 white stomatic bands. The apex of the leaves are emarginate and they measure 16 to 20 mm (0.63 to 0.79 inches) long. The petioles are crooked. The foliage is very similar to that of T. heterophylla, but T. chinensis has nodding shoots and the stomatic bands are paler and more sparse. Also the colour above is a paler yellowish-green. The stamenate flowers appear singly on one-year-old shoots, or in groups of 1 to 5 on two-year-old shoots. They are a dull purple in colour and measure about 8 mm (0.31 inches). The male cones are terminal on a very short shoot, nod, are rosy-purple and are about 6 mm (0.24 inches) in length. The female cones are green, later turning to red-brown, long-ovoid in shape and measure 2 to 2.5 mm (0.079 to 0.098 inches) long by about 1 cm (0.39 inches) wide. They are pendulous and the cone scales are large and suborbicular with longitudinal streaks. The bracts are small and 2 lobed at the apex. The seeds are winged and measure about 7 mm (0.28 inches) long with the wing included.

== Range and habitat ==
T. chinensis is found in Taiwan, China (from Tibet to southern Shanxi province and Guangdong province), and northern Ha Giang province in Vietnam. In the very south of their range they are only found high in the mountains. For example, in Vietnam the tree is only found in mountains 1,300 to 1,700 m (4,300 to 5,600 feet) above sea level. In China it is present at altitudes of 1,000 to 3,500 m (3,300 to 11,500 feet) in the following provinces: Anhui, Fujian, southern Gansu, Guangdong, Guangxi, northern Guizhou, western Henan, western Hubei, Hunan, Jiangxi, southern Shaanxi, Sichuan, Tibet, Yunnan, and Zhejiang. This comprises the southern half of the country with a few population farther north. It is found primarily in mixed forests near river basins and in mountains and valleys. In Taiwan it is found mainly in Nantou County and Taoyuan City at heights of 1,700 to 3,500 m (5,600 to 11,500 feet) in mixed broadleaf forests. It can be found in Taiwans's Yushan National Park and Lalashan Preserve, as well as in China's Hailuogou Glacier Park in Sichuan province.

== Taxonomy ==
There are a number of varieties of T. chinensis, though there is much dispute over which are valid and whether some constitute distinct species or not. All in all there are six varieties, though not all are accepted universally. These are:

- T. c. var. chinensis is the type variety and occurs across most of the range in mainland China and Tibet. Its seed scales are pentagonal-ovate, subsquare, or suborbicular, while its branchlets are 1 mm (0.039 inches) in diameter and grey to yellow-grey in colour. The cones are ovoid and 1.5 to 2.5 cm (0.59 to 0.98 inches) tall by 1.2 to 1.6 cm (0.47 to 0.63 inches) wide.
- T. c. var. formosana is the variety that occurs exclusively in Taiwan. Aljos Farjon, a conifer expert from the Royal Botanic Gardens at Kew, considers this variety identical with the type, but according to Raven and Wu it differs from the type by having seed scales which are compressed orbicular to nearly semiorbicular. Otherwise, however, it is like the type.
- T. c. var. patens is found only in western Hubei province on Changyang Xian. It differs in having brownish yellow to brown branchlets, which are between to 0.5 to 1 mm (0.020 to 0.039 inches) longer in diameter than the type. The seed cones also differ in being slightly larger, ovoid-globose in shape, and with seed scales that are smooth, shiny and almost square. This variety is recognized by Raven and Wu.
- T. c. var. forrestii is treated as a separate species, namely Tsuga forrestii, by some authorities. The cones are larger, more slender and narrow-ovoid to ovoid-cylindric. The branchlets are slightly thicker, while the seed scales are narrowly ovate or oblong with the exposed part striate and glabrous with a thickened margin. Regardless of its taxonomic status, it is considered threatened by the IUCN. It occurs only in northeast Guizhou, southwest Sichuan and northwest Yunnan.
- T. c. var. robusta is probably the most universally recognised of the varieties. It is present in western Hubei and western Sichuan. It again exhibits the thicker branchlets and larger cones, but the cones are stout and shortly cylindric. Also, the seed scales are square-orbicular with the exposed part being pubescent and the margin not thickened. In addition, the bracts are cuspidate at the apex.
- T. c. var. oblongisquamata is considered a separate species by Raven and Wu, namely T. oblongisquamata, but as a variety by Farjon. It occurs in the northern part of the range, namely in southern Gansu, western Hubei and northwest Sichuan. It differs most sharply in lacking visible stomatic bands beneath the leaves. Otherwise the seed scales are more loosely arranged and loosely elliptic in shape, being nearly twice as long as they are wide.

== Uses ==
The timber obtained from T. chinensis is used in construction, furniture making, and as a support in mines. The bark is high in tannins, which is often extracted and used as a dye. The trunk is used as a source of resin. In addition, the roots, trunk, and branches are all used in the production of aromatic oils due to their pleasing scent.
