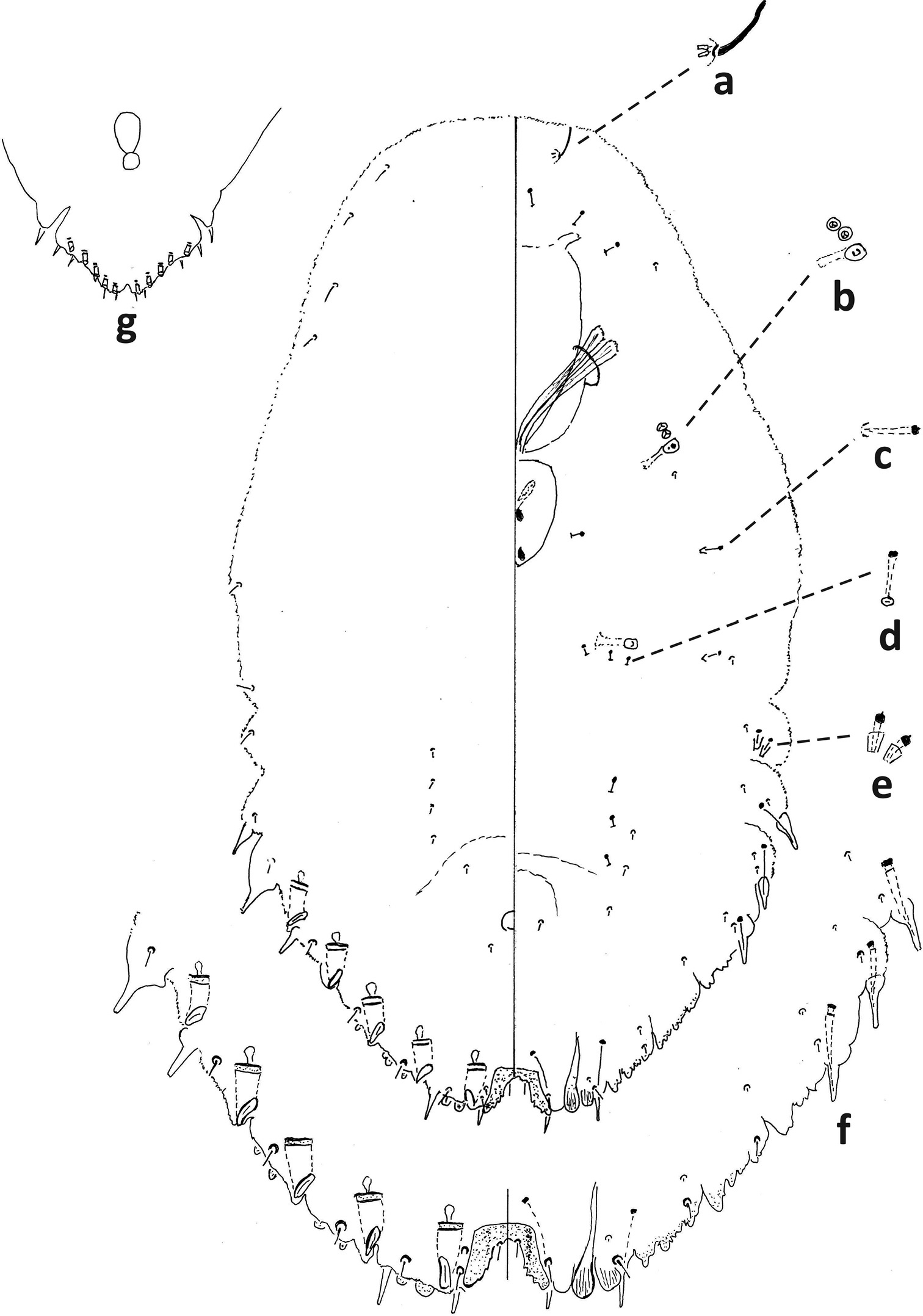
- Fiorinia phantasma 2nd instar female - a) antenna; b) anterior spiracle c) microduct with sclerotized orifice; g) old second-instar female.

Scientific classification
- Kingdom: Animalia
- Phylum: Arthropoda
- Class: Insecta
- Order: Hemiptera
- Suborder: Sternorrhyncha
- Family: Diaspididae
- Genus: Fiorinia
- Species: F. phantasma

Binomial name
- Fiorinia phantasma Cockerell & Robinson, 1915

Synonyms
- Fiorinia coronata Williams & Watson 1988

= Fiorinia phantasma =

Species of scale insect

Fiorinia phantasma, the phantasma scale, is an invasive and polyphagous scale insect, apparently native to parts of south-eastern Asia and some Pacific islands. It has invaded other parts of the Pacific, Asia, the Indian Ocean, Europe and the Americas, spreading with the trade of ornamental plants. It has caused serious outbreaks on palm trees, but also infests various other woody plants, including a number of ornamentals and fruit trees like mango or lychee.

== Distribution ==
Fiorinia phantasma was described from the Philippines in 1915, where it had been collected from Neolitsea. The first documented occurrence outside the Philippines and the first case of invasion was reported from the Hawaii Islands, where heavy infestations were reported from Oahu Island on Ligustrum japonicum in 2004, and on Pittosporum tobira in 2008. Subsequently, it was collected from 15 other plants, including a serious infestation on areca palms in 2011 on Maui Island.

F. phantasma was again described as Fiorinia coronata from the Solomon Islands in 1988, where it infested coconut palms. It has been subsequently reported as an introduced pest from different parts of the world and seems to spread easily through the international trade with ornamental plants. It is now recorded as widespread in south-eastern Asia (southern China, Taiwan, Vietnam, Thailand, Singapore, Malaysia and Indonesia), on various Pacific islands from Papua New Guinea in the west to French Polynesia in the east, on several islands in the Indian Ocean (Maldives, Reunion), and on indoor or glasshouse plants from parts of Europe (France, Netherlands, U.K.).

In the Americas it has been reported from several Caribbean islands (Saint Martin, Grenada) and has also invaded Florida on the U.S. mainland. In Florida, it was first recorded as causing a serious infestation on Canary Island date palms (Phoenix canariensis) in 2018, and was later also reported from other palms and various ornamentals.

== Description ==
The scale cover excreted by the second instar females of F. phantasma is elongated, about 1.2 mm long and light to dark brown with a weakly developed longitudinal ridge. The body of the adult female inside the 2nd instar exuviae is wide at the thorax, but narrows abruptly at body segment III, tapering to a narrow, almost pointed pygidium at the posterior end. The body of the adult female may be yellowish, reddish or may have reddish transverse stripes. Male scales have a white scale cover like in several other species of Fiorinia.

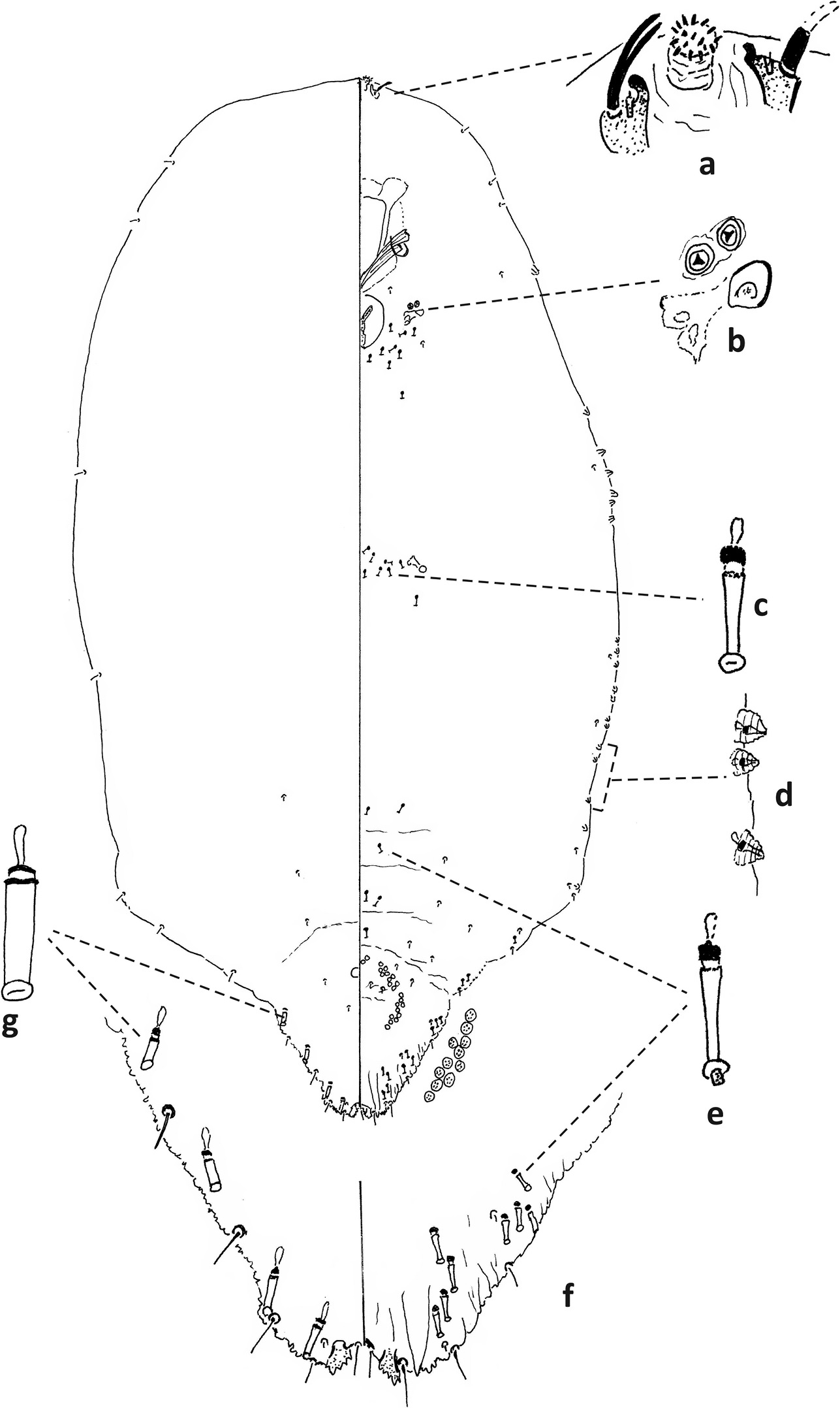
Adult female of Fiorinia phantasma - a) antenna detail and inter-antennal process; b) anterior spiracle; c) microducts; d) marginal duct tubercles; e) marginal microduct; f) details of pygidium; g) marginal macroduct on pygidium.

There are several morphologically similar species of Fiorinia which cannot be separated by their scale covers or their host plants. For example, in North America Fiorinia phantasma is very similar to Fiorinia fioriniae and both commonly infest ornamental palms. However, as of 2024, F. phantasma has been only reported from Florida. For a reliable identification of F. phantasma, a slide mount and microscopic examination of the morphological details are required using the available keys. For routine field surveys, a temporary slide mount may be sufficient.

== Biology ==
Fiorinia phantasma is polyphagous and infests the underside of the leaves, but might spread to the upper side in dense populations. It has been mainly reported from tropical woody ornamental plants, especially palm trees. ScaleNet list 25 plant families and 54 plant genera as host plants, the large majority of them from the family Arecaceae (palm trees). Infested crops include cultivated palms like coconut and areca palms, as well as fruit trees like mango or lychee.

As with other scale insects, only the first instar, the crawler stage, is mobile and can move to other parts of the host plant or spread by wind. The crawlers settle after a few days and start feeding on the leaves with their piercing and sucking mouthparts. The scale feeds mainly on parenchymal cells or vascular bundle tissue. Females only moult twice, to the second instar nymph and to the adult female which remains within the exuviae of the 2nd instar. Males have 2 additional instars.

Long distance spread happens by human transport of host plants. F. phantasma is often intercepted by quarantine and also spreads frequently during the distribution of nursery plants.

== Damage and management ==
Serious outbreaks have been mainly reported during the first years after an introduction of Fiorinia phantasma into a new area. Infested leaves become yellow (chlorosis), they drop prematurely, and host plants may wilt and die due to the attack. In the Maldives, approximately 6000 coconut palms were heavily infested on one island, affecting fruit production. Nurseries of ornamental plants may be seriously affected, promoting spread of the pest.

Management of infestations is difficult, due to the scales being protected by their wax cover and important natural enemies being sensitive to chemical pesticides. Treatments with horticultural oils and insecticidal soaps as foliar spray, preferably when crawlers are most abundant, is often the best approach. Some pesticides may be suitable for soil drench.

== Natural enemies ==
A number of predator insects and parasitoids have been reported as natural enemies of Fiorinia phantasma. Infested plants on which abundant beneficial insects are present should not be treated with pesticides. The natural enemies include predacious lacewings, ladybugs, thrips and mite species, as well as parasitoids from the genera Aphytis and Encarsia.
