= Tsuga forrestii =

Conservation status
- Vulnerable (IUCN 3.1)

Scientific classification
- Kingdom: Plantae
- Clade: Tracheophytes
- Clade: Gymnosperms
- Division: Pinophyta
- Class: Pinopsida
- Order: Pinales
- Family: Pinaceae
- Genus: Tsuga
- Species: T. forrestii

Binomial name
- Tsuga forrestii Downie

Synonyms
- Tsuga chinensis var. forrestii (Downie) Silba

Species of conifer

Tsuga forrestii is a species of conifer in the pine family, Pinaceae. It is considered as a variety of Tsuga chinensis (i.e., T. c. var. forrestii) by some. It grows in mixed forests in mountains and valleys of northeast Guizhou, southwest Sichuan, and northwest Yunnan, at altitudes of 2,000–3,000 m (6,600–9,800 ft).

While not a target species, Tsuga forrestii is threatened by clear-cutting of mixed forests.
