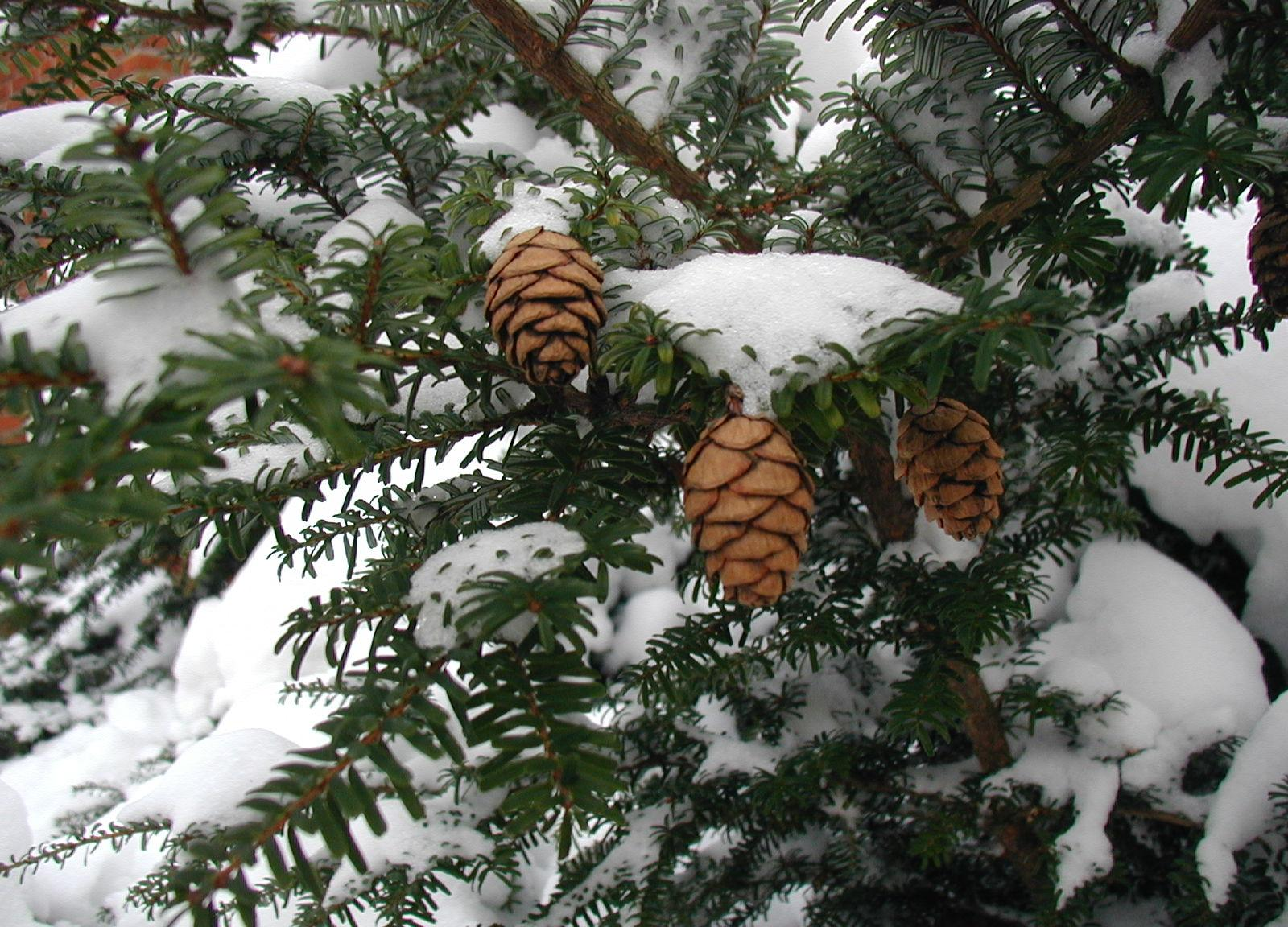
- Foliage and cones covered in snow

Conservation status
- Least Concern (IUCN 3.1)

Scientific classification
- Kingdom: Plantae
- Clade: Tracheophytes
- Clade: Gymnosperms
- Division: Pinophyta
- Class: Pinopsida
- Order: Pinales
- Family: Pinaceae
- Genus: Tsuga
- Species: T. diversifolia

Binomial name
- Tsuga diversifolia (Maxim.) Mast.

Synonyms
- Homotypic Synonyms: Abies diversifolia Maxim.; Pinus araragi var. diversifolia (Maxim.) Voss; Heterotypic Synonyms: Abies tsuga var. nana Endl.; Tsuga blaringhemii Flous; Tsuga diversifolia subsp. blaringhemii (Flous) A.E.Murray

= Tsuga diversifolia =

Northern Japanese hemlock

Species of conifer

Tsuga diversifolia, commonly known as northern Japanese hemlock, is a species of conifer in the pine family, Pinaceae. It is native to the Japanese islands of Honshū, Kyūshū, and Shikoku. In Europe and North America, the species is sometimes employed as tree for the garden and has been in cultivation since 1861.

== Description ==
Tsuga diversifolia is a coniferous tree that attains heights of 25 m (80 feet). The crown is narrow, dense and conical. Young shoots are short, palely pubescent and bright orange to red-brown in colour. The densely arranged needles are linear-oblong and 5 to 15 mm (0.20 to 0.59 inches) long and up to 2.4 mm (0.094 inches) wide. They are a dark green in colour, glossy and furrowed above with two chalk white stomatal bands below.

The bark is an orange-brown in colour, shallowly fissured and vertically peeling. The buds are a deep purple red. The dull purple, ovoid male cones are terminal on either long or short shoots. They measure about 5 mm (0.20 inches) and as they mature become pale green with the centre and margin of each scale being purple. The female cones are 1.8 to 2.8 cm (0.71 to 1.10 inches) long, cylindric-ovoid, and nearly sessile. They are dark brown, pendulous and the scales are slightly convex and ridged.
