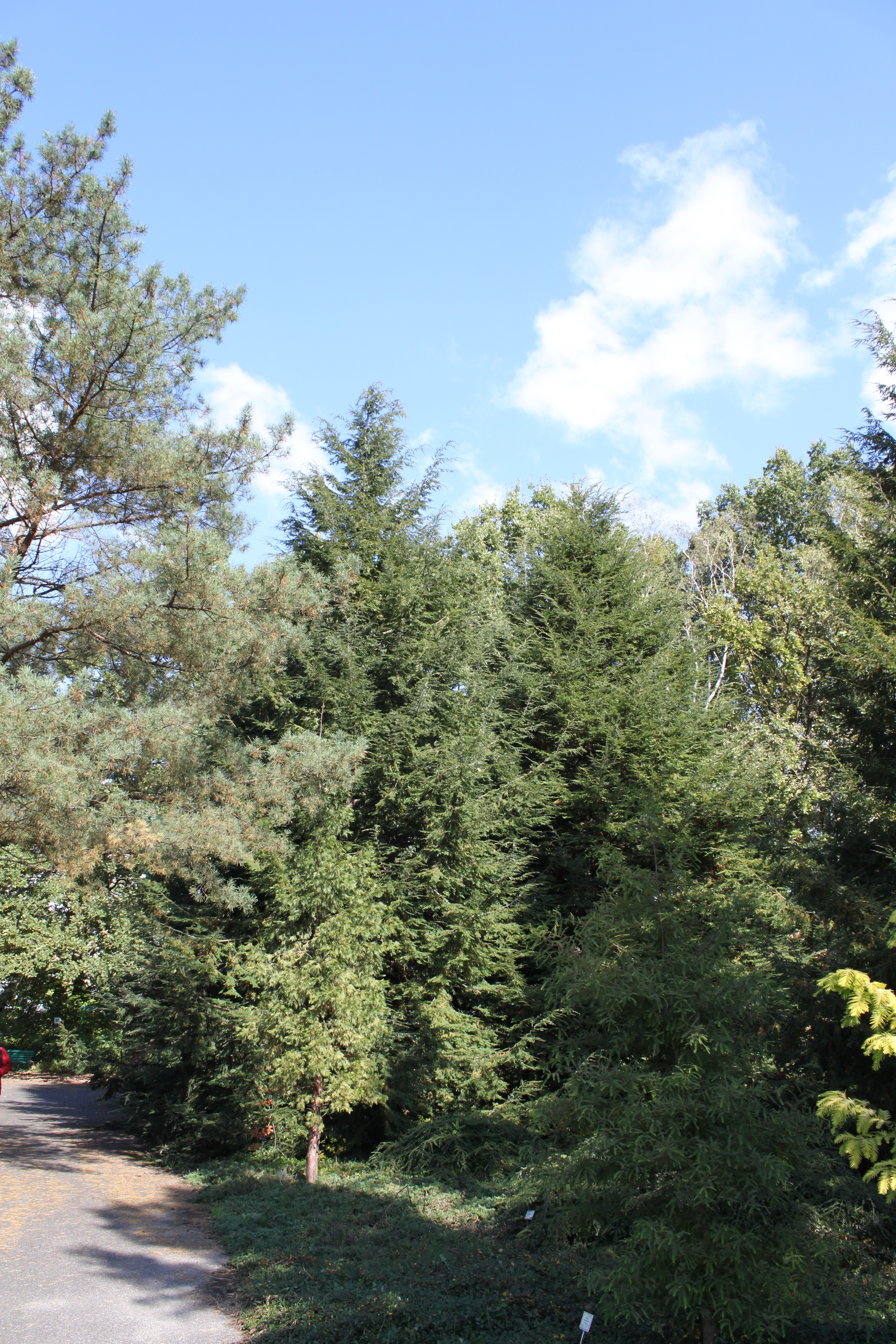
- Tsuga canadensis

Scientific classification
- Kingdom: Plantae
- Clade: Tracheophytes
- Clade: Gymnosperms
- Division: Pinophyta
- Class: Pinopsida
- Order: Pinales
- Family: Pinaceae
- Subfamily: Abietoideae
- Genus: Tsuga (Endl.) Carrière

Synonyms
- Hesperopeuce (Engelmann) Lemmon; ×Hesperotsuga C.N.Page; Micropeuce (Spach) Gordon; ×Tsugo-picea Van Campo & Gaussen; ×Tsugo-piceo-picea Van Campo & Gaussen; ×Tsugo-piceo-tsuga Van Campo & Gaussen

= Tsuga =

Genus of conifers

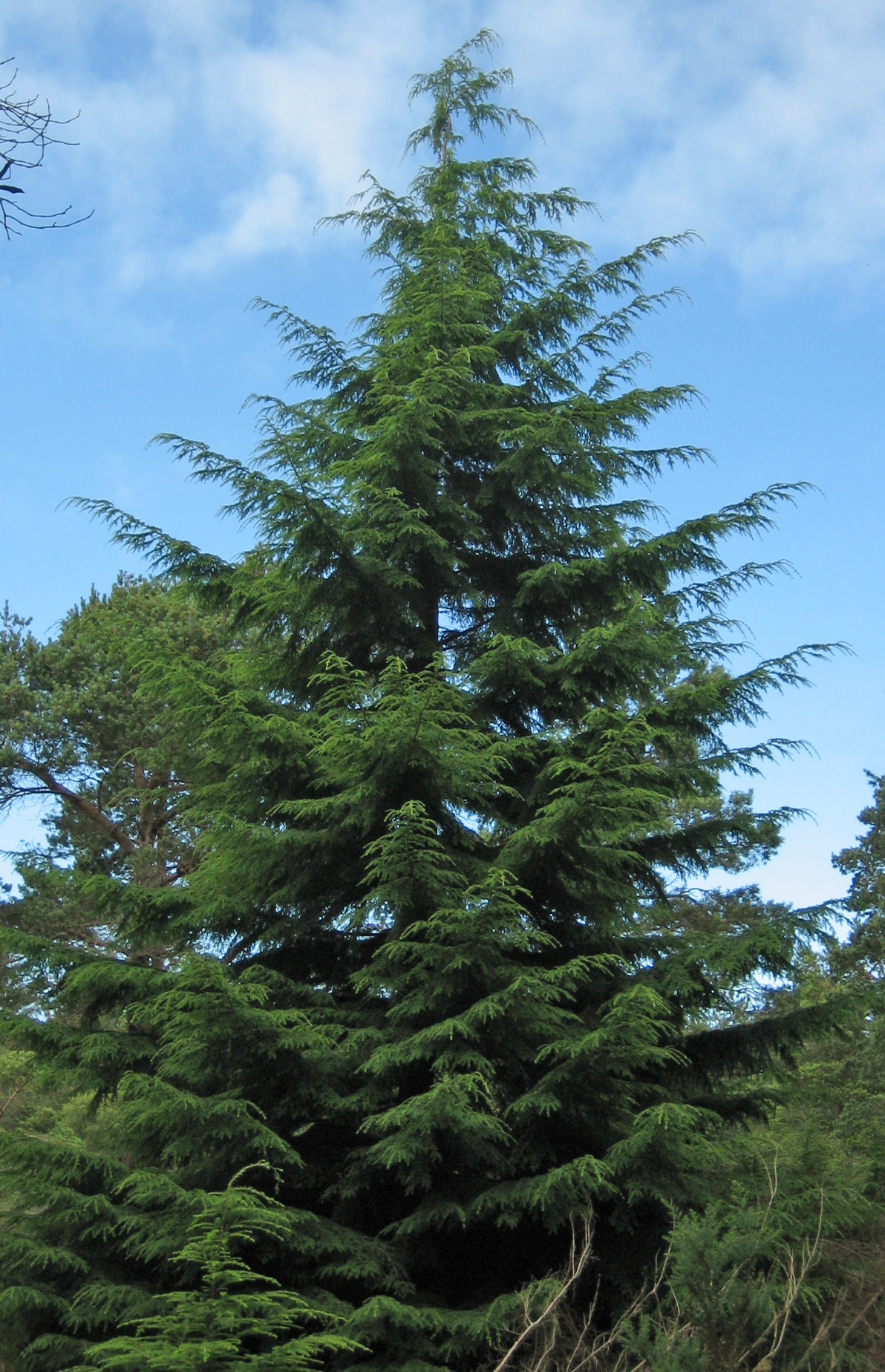
Tsuga heterophylla

Tsuga (/ˈsuːɡə/, from Japanese 栂 (ツガ), the name of Tsuga sieboldii) is a genus of conifers in the pine family, Pinaceae. The English-language common name, "hemlock" arose from a perceived similarity in the smell of its crushed foliage to that of the unrelated plant hemlock. Unlike the latter, Tsuga species are not poisonous.

The genus comprises eight to ten species (depending on the authority), with four species occurring in North America and four to six in eastern Asia.

== Description ==
Hemlocks are medium-sized to large coniferous trees, ranging from 10–60 metres (33–197 feet) tall, with a conical to irregular crown, the latter occurring especially in some of the Asian species. The leading shoots generally droop. The bark is scaly and commonly deeply furrowed, with the colour ranging from grey to brown. The branches stem horizontally from the trunk and are usually arranged in flattened sprays that bend downward towards their tips. Short spur shoots, which are present in many gymnosperms, are weakly to moderately developed. The young twigs, as well as the distal portions of stem, are flexible and often pendent. The stems are rough with pulvini that persist after the leaves fall. The winter buds are ovoid or globose, usually rounded at the apex and not resinous.

The leaves are flattened to slightly angular and range from 5–35 millimetres (3/16–1 3/8 inches) long and 1–3 mm (1/32–1/8 in) broad. They are borne singly and are arranged spirally on the stem; the leaf bases are twisted so the leaves lie flat either side of the stem or more rarely radially. Towards the base, the leaves narrow abruptly to a petiole set on a forward-angled pulvinus. The petiole is twisted at the base so it is almost parallel with the stem. The leaf apex is either notched, rounded, or acute. The undersides have two white stomatal bands (which are inconspicuous on T. mertensiana) separated by an elevated midvein. The upper surface of the leaves lack stomata, except those of T. mertensiana. They have one resin canal that is present beneath the single vascular bundle.

The pollen cones grow solitary from lateral buds. They are 3–5 mm (1/8–3/16 in) – usually up to 5 mm or 3/16 in – in length, ovoid, globose, or ellipsoid, and yellowish-white to pale purple, and borne on a short peduncle. The pollen itself has a saccate, ring-like structure at its distal pole, and rarely this structure can be more or less doubly saccate. The seed cones are borne on year-old twigs and are small ovoid-globose or oblong-cylindric, ranging from 15–40 mm (5/8–1 5/8 in) long, except in T. mertensiana, where they are cylindrical and longer, 35–80 mm (1 1/2–3 1/4 in) in length; they are solitary, terminal or rarely lateral, pendulous, and are sessile or on a short peduncle up to 4 mm (3/16 in) long. Maturation occurs in 5–8 months, and the seeds are shed shortly thereafter; the cones are shed soon after seed release or up to a year or two later. The seed scales are thin, leathery, and persistent. They vary in shape and lack an apophysis and an umbo. The bracts are included and small. The seeds are small, from 2 to 4 mm (3/32 to 5/32 in) long, and winged, with the wing being 8 to 12 mm (5/16 to 1/2 in) in length. They also contain small adaxial resin vesicles. Seed germination is epigeal; the seedlings have 4–6 cotyledons.

== Taxonomy ==
Mountain hemlock (T. mertensiana) is unusual in the genus in several respects: the leaves are less flattened and arranged all round the shoot, and have stomata above as well as below, giving the foliage a glaucous colour; and the cones are the longest in the genus, 35–80 mm (1 3/8–3 1/8 in) long and cylindrical rather than ovoid. Some botanists treat it in a distinct genus as Hesperopeuce mertensiana (Bong.) Rydb., though it is more generally only considered distinct at the rank of subgenus.

The oldest fossils attributed to the genus are twigs, known from the Early Cretaceous of Inner Mongolia, China, though their relationship to modern Tsuga is not unambiguous. The earliest pollen attributed to the genus is known from the Upper Cretaceous of Poland, dating to around 90 million years ago. Abundant remains are only known from Eocene onwards, when the modern Tsuga crown group is thought to have begun to diversify. While formerly present in the region Tsuga became extinct in Europe during the Middle Pleistocene epoch around 780-440,000 years ago, due to unfavourable climate change caused by the ongoing Quaternary glaciation.

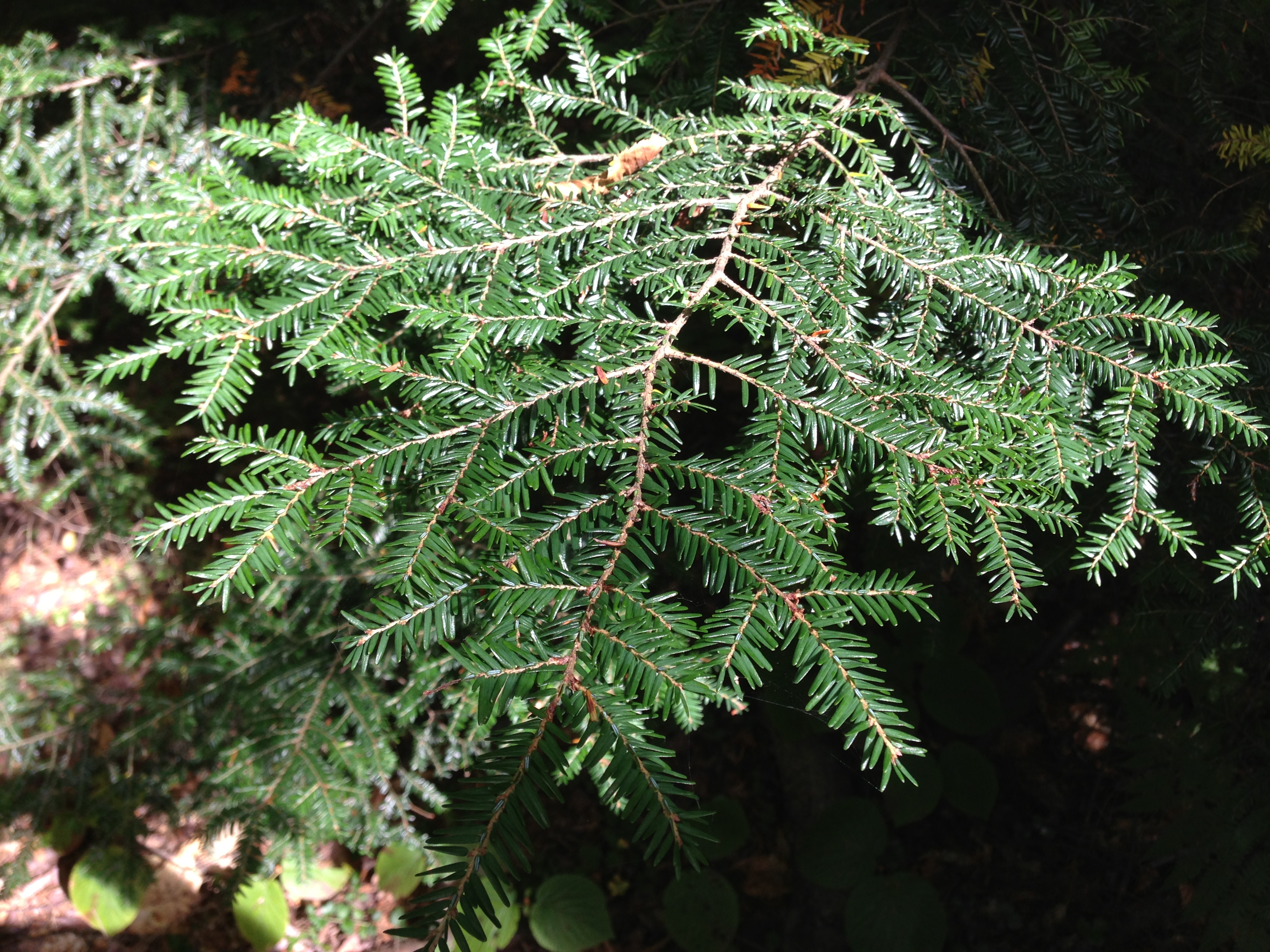
T. canadensis leaves are retained for 3–4 (–5) years

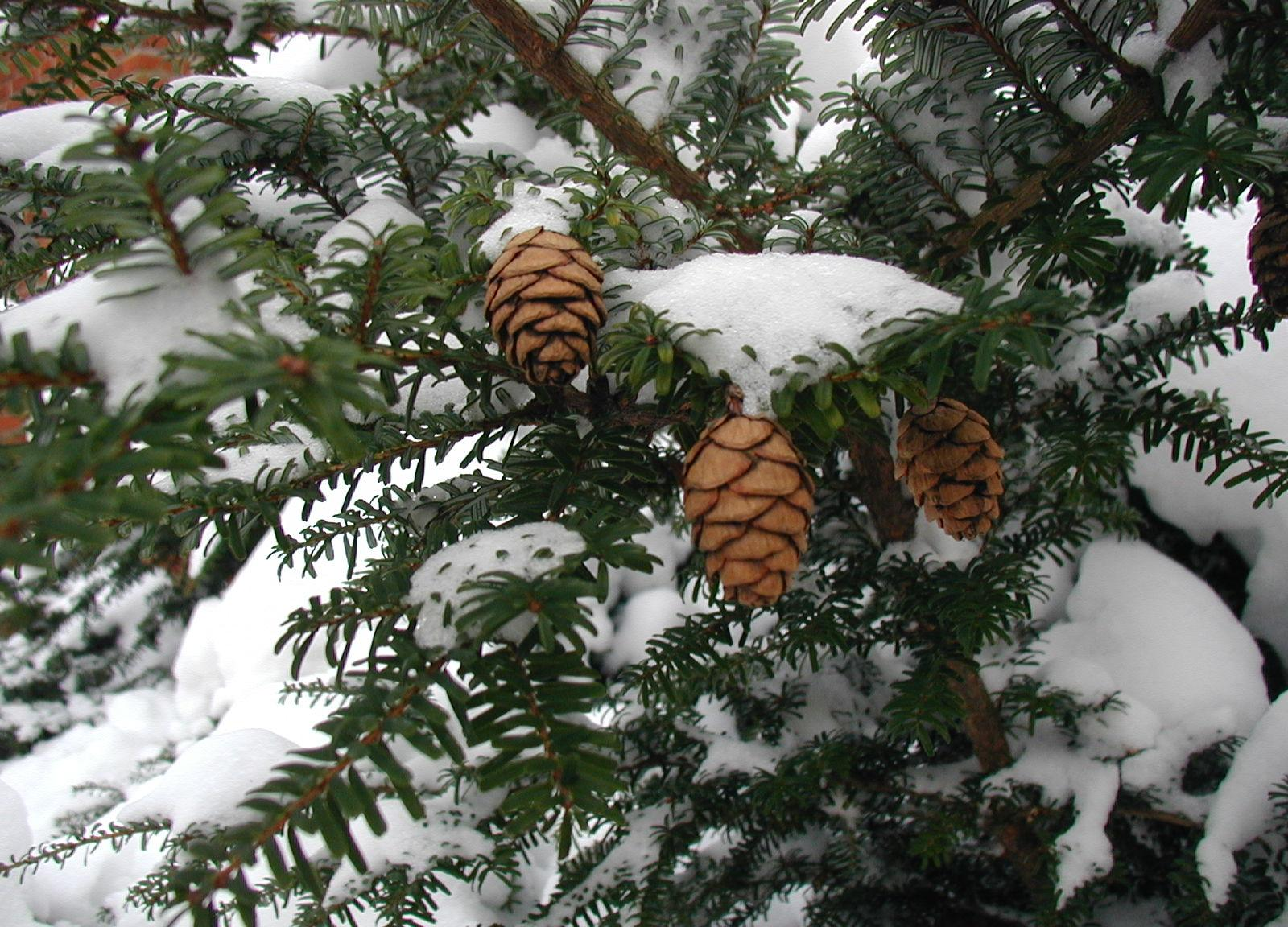
T. diversifolia foliage and cones in snow

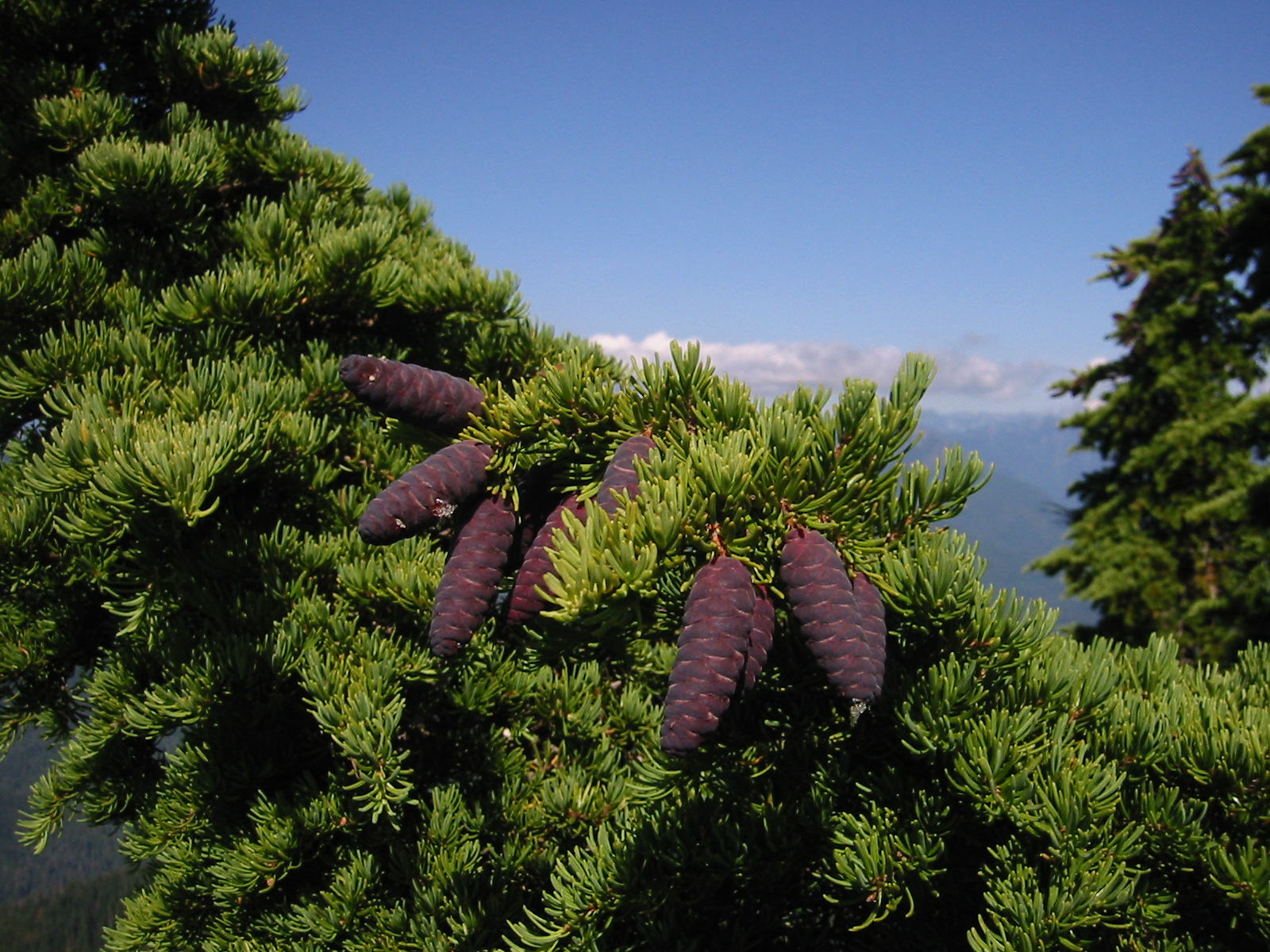
T. mertensiana foliage and cones

Another species, bristlecone hemlock, first described as T. longibracteata, is now treated in a distinct genus Nothotsuga; it differs from Tsuga in the erect (not pendulous) cones with exserted bracts, and male cones clustered in umbels, in these features more closely allied to the genus Keteleeria.

=== Phylogeny ===
While previous phylogenies found Tsuga to be separated into Asian and American clades, recent phylogenomic work has produced a much more resolved and nuanced picture of Tsuga relationships. A recent study based on an analysis of 881 nuclear genes plus data from 60 plastid and 23 mitochondrial loci claims that the genus most likely originated in North America. Some members of the genus then later spread from North America to East Asia via the Bering Land Bridge.

Tsuga appears to comprise two clades, one containing the Western North American hemlock species T. mertensiana and T. heterophylla, and the other containing Eastern North American and Asian hemlocks. Complex reticulate evolutionary history, specifically among East Asian taxa, have also complicated their phylogenetic relationship to each other. T. chinensis exemplifies the complexity caused by this reticulate evolutionary history, as it forms a paraphyletic group, highlighting the need for more research and potential taxonomic re-evaluation.

The cladogram below represents the best current estimate for the phylogeny of Tsuga.

- Tsuga
  - - T. heterophylla
    - T. mertensiana
  - - T. canadensis
    - - T. caroliniana
      - - - T. diversifolia
          - T. ulleungensis
        - - T.dumosa
          - - - T. sieboldii
              - T. chinensis(Taiwan)
            - - T. chinensis(E)
              - - T. chinensis(W)
                - T. forrestii

=== Species ===
Accepted living species

- Tsuga canadensis – eastern hemlock – Eastern Canada, Eastern United States
- Tsuga caroliniana – Carolina hemlock – Southern Appalachians
- Tsuga chinensis – Taiwan hemlock – Taiwan, Tibet, much of China
- Tsuga diversifolia – northern Japanese hemlock – Honshu, Kyushu
- Tsuga dumosa – Himalayan hemlock – Himalayas, Tibet, Yunnan, Sichuan
- Tsuga forrestii – Forrest's hemlock – Sichuan, Yunnan, Guizhou
- Tsuga heterophylla – western hemlock – Western Canada, Northwestern United States
- Tsuga × jeffreyi – British Columbia, Washington (doubtful; often treated as a variety of T. mertensiana, with no verified evidence of hybrid origin)
- Tsuga mertensiana – mountain hemlock – Alaska, British Columbia, Western United States
- Tsuga sieboldii – southern Japanese hemlock – Japan
- Tsuga ulleungensis – Ulleungdo hemlock – Ulleung Island, Korea

Accepted paleospecies

- †Tsuga aburaensis Tanai - Abura, Hokkaido (Miocene)
- †Tsuga asiatica - Lawula Formation, Tibet (Priabonian)
- †Tsuga europaea - Maria Mine, Alsdorf, North Rhine-Westphalia (Miocene)
- †Tsuga nanfengensis - Yunnan (Late Miocene)
- †Tsuga swedaea - Buchanan Lake Formation, Axel Heiberg Island (Lutetian)
- †Tsuga taxoides - Inner Mongolia (Early Cretaceous)
- †Tsuga weichangensis - Hebei (Miocene)
- †Tsuga xianfengensis - Yunnan (Late Miocene)

Formerly included

Moved to other genera:

- T. ajanensis – Picea jezoensis
- T. argyrophylla – Cathaya argyrophylla
- T. balfouriana – Picea likiangensis var. rubescens
- T. japonica – Pseudotsuga japonica
- T. lindleyana – Pseudotsuga menziesii var. glauca
- T. longibracteata – Nothotsuga longibracteata
- T. macrocarpa – Pseudotsuga macrocarpa
- T. mairei – Taxus mairei
- T. roulletii – Keteleeria evelyniana

== Ecology ==
The species are all adapted to (and are confined to) relatively moist, cool temperate areas with high rainfall, cool summers, and little or no water stress; they are also adapted to cope with heavy to very heavy winter snowfall and tolerate ice storms better than most other trees. Hemlock trees are more tolerant of heavy shade than other conifers; they are, however, more susceptible to drought.

=== Threats ===
The two eastern North American species, T. canadensis and T. caroliniana, are under serious threat by the sap-sucking insect Adelges tsugae (hemlock woolly adelgid). This adelgid, related to the aphids, was introduced accidentally from eastern Asia, where it is only a minor pest. Extensive mortality has occurred, particularly east of the Appalachian Mountains. The Asian species are resistant to this pest, and the two western American hemlocks are moderately resistant. In North America, hemlocks are also attacked by hemlock looper. Larger infected hemlocks have large, relatively high root systems that can bring other trees down if one falls. The foliage of young trees is often browsed by deer, and the seeds are eaten by finches and small rodents.

Old trees are commonly attacked by various fungal disease and decay species, notably Heterobasidion annosum and Armillaria species, which rot the heartwood and eventually leave the tree liable to windthrow, and Rhizina undulata, which may kill groups of trees following minor grass fires that activate growth of the Rhizina spores.

== Uses ==
The wood obtained from hemlocks is important in the timber industry, especially for use as wood pulp. Many species are used in horticulture, and numerous cultivars have been selected for use in gardens. The bark is also used in tanning leather. The needles are sometimes used to make a tea and perfume.
