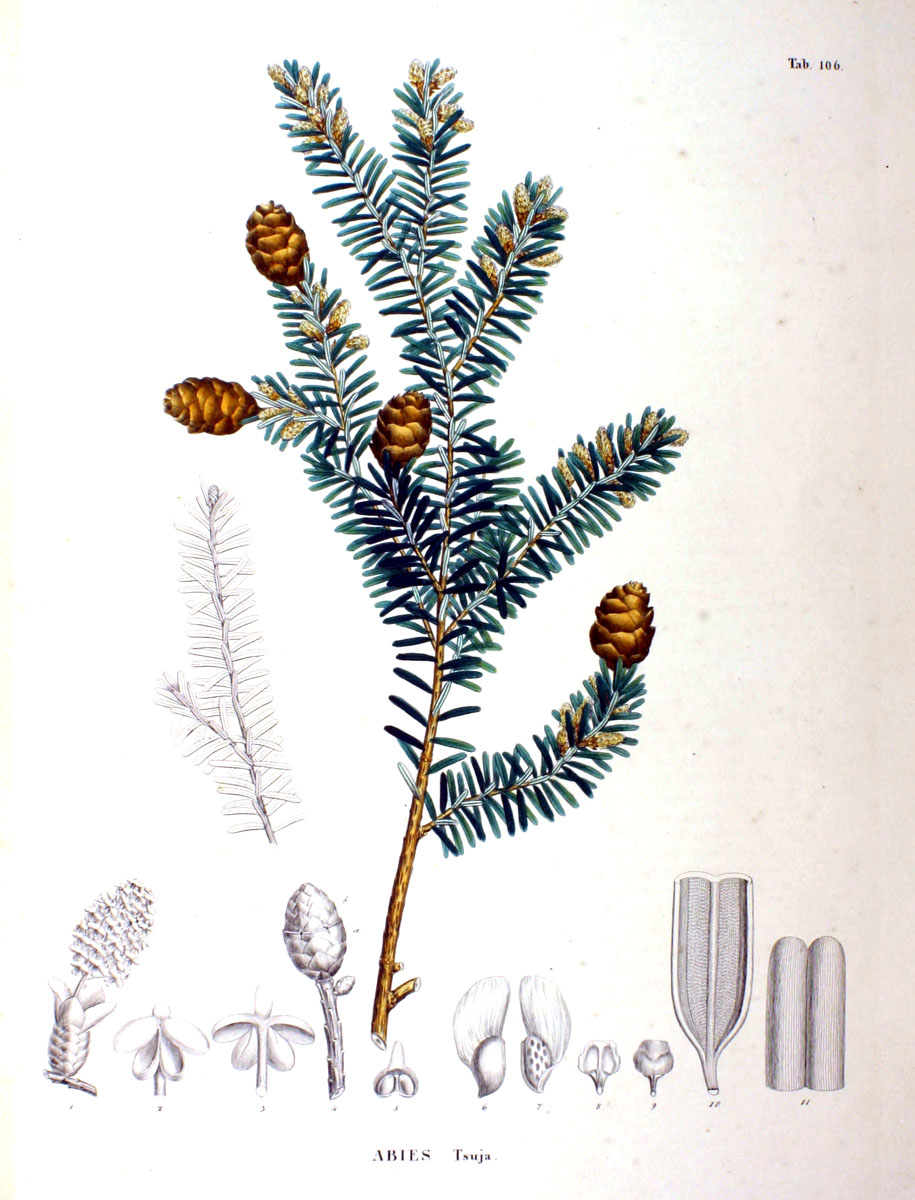
- Drawing from 1870 Flora Japonica, Sectio Prima

Conservation status
- Near Threatened (IUCN 3.1)

Scientific classification
- Kingdom: Plantae
- Clade: Tracheophytes
- Clade: Gymnosperms
- Division: Pinophyta
- Class: Pinopsida
- Order: Pinales
- Family: Pinaceae
- Genus: Tsuga
- Species: T. sieboldii

Binomial name
- Tsuga sieboldii Carrière

Synonyms
- Abies tsuga Siebold et Zucc.; Pinus tsuga (Sieb. et Zucc.) Antoine; Tsuga tsuja (Sieb. et Zucc.) A.Murray bis; Pinus sieboldii (Carr.) W.R. McNab; Pinus araragi Siebold; Tsuga araragi (Siebold) Koehne

= Tsuga sieboldii =

Southern Japanese hemlock

Species of conifer

Tsuga sieboldii, also called the southern Japanese hemlock, or in Japanese, simply tsuga (栂), is a species of conifer in the pine family, Pinaceae, native to the Japanese islands of Honshū, Kyūshū, Shikoku and Yakushima. In Europe and North America the tree is sometimes used as an ornamental and has been in cultivation since 1861.

== Description ==
The tree is often multiple-stemmed from the base and the dense crown is broadly conical and pointed. The bark is a dark pink-grey in colour. It is smooth with horizontal folds when the tree is young, but later cracks into squares and become flaky. The glabrous shoots are a pale shining buff, but they may vary to white or pale brown. The base of the petiole is red-brown. The leaves are densely set in irregular flat rows. They are broad and stubby in comparison to other species of the genus Tsuga, and they vary in length from 0.7 to 2 cm (0.28 to 0.79 in) long by about 0.2 cm (0.079 in) wide. They are blunt with notched tips and shiny dark green above. The underside of the leaves has two broad, dull white stomatal bands. The buds are narrow based and ovoid, dark orange in colour. Their scales are convex.

The male cones are terminal on weak shoots. They are very small at only 2 mm (0.079 in), globular in shape and cherry-red in colour. The female cones are slightly larger at 5 mm (0.20 in), purple in colour, pendulous and ovoid-conic in shape. The tips are blunt and they measure about 2.3 cm long by 1.3 cm (0.51 in) wide. Their scales are flat topped.
