= Pseudocharis minima =

Scientific classification
- Kingdom: Animalia
- Phylum: Arthropoda
- Class: Insecta
- Order: Lepidoptera
- Superfamily: Noctuoidea
- Family: Erebidae
- Subfamily: Arctiinae
- Genus: Pseudocharis
- Species: P. minima

Binomial name
- Pseudocharis minima (Grote, 1867)

Synonyms
- Hippola minima Grote, 1867; Pseudomya minima

Species of insect in the butterfly and moth order Lepidoptera

Pseudocharis minima, the lesser wasp moth, is a moth in the subfamily Arctiinae. It was described by Augustus Radcliffe Grote in 1867. It is found on Cuba and in Florida. The habitat consists of pine rocklands, tropical hammocks and the ecotone between hammocks and salt marshes.

The wingspan is 30–35 mm.

The larvae feed on Crossopetalum species, but have also been recorded on Myginda ilicifolia.
