= Rhacoma =

Rhacoma may refer to two different genera of plants:

- Rhacoma L., a taxonomic synonym for Crossopetalum, the Christmas-berries
- Rhacoma Adans., a taxonomic synonym for Centaurea in the family Asteraceae
