= Pseudocharis translucida =

Scientific classification
- Kingdom: Animalia
- Phylum: Arthropoda
- Clade: Pancrustacea
- Class: Insecta
- Order: Lepidoptera
- Superfamily: Noctuoidea
- Family: Erebidae
- Subfamily: Arctiinae
- Genus: Pseudocharis
- Species: P. translucida

Binomial name
- Pseudocharis translucida Dognin, 1890

Species of moth

Pseudocharis translucida is a moth in the subfamily Arctiinae. It was described by Paul Dognin in 1890. It is found in Ecuador.
