= Pseudocharis melanthus =

Scientific classification
- Domain: Eukaryota
- Kingdom: Animalia
- Phylum: Arthropoda
- Class: Insecta
- Order: Lepidoptera
- Superfamily: Noctuoidea
- Family: Erebidae
- Subfamily: Arctiinae
- Genus: Pseudocharis
- Species: P. melanthus

Binomial name
- Pseudocharis melanthus (Stoll, [1781])

Synonyms
- Sphinx melanthus Stoll, [1781]

Species of moth

Pseudocharis melanthus is a moth in the subfamily Arctiinae. It was described by Stoll in 1781. It is found in Colombia and Suriname.
