= Pseudocharis picta =

Scientific classification
- Domain: Eukaryota
- Kingdom: Animalia
- Phylum: Arthropoda
- Class: Insecta
- Order: Lepidoptera
- Superfamily: Noctuoidea
- Family: Erebidae
- Subfamily: Arctiinae
- Genus: Pseudocharis
- Species: P. picta

Binomial name
- Pseudocharis picta (Schaus, 1894)

Synonyms
- Pseudomya picta Schaus, 1894

Species of moth

Pseudocharis picta is a moth in the subfamily Arctiinae. It was described by Schaus in 1894. It is found in Venezuela.
