= Pseudocharis =

Scientific classification
- Domain: Eukaryota
- Kingdom: Animalia
- Phylum: Arthropoda
- Class: Insecta
- Order: Lepidoptera
- Superfamily: Noctuoidea
- Family: Erebidae
- Subfamily: Arctiinae
- Subtribe: Euchromiina
- Genus: Pseudocharis; H. Druce in Godman & Salvin, 1884

Genus of moths

Pseudocharis is a genus of tiger moths in the family Erebidae. It was erected by Herbert Druce in 1884.

== Species ==
- Pseudocharis melanthus (Stoll, [1781])
- Pseudocharis minima (Grote, 1867) – lesser wasp moth
- Pseudocharis naenia H. Druce, 1884
- Pseudocharis picta (Schaus, 1894)
- Pseudocharis romani (Bryk, 1953)
- Pseudocharis sanguiceps (Hampson, 1898)
- Pseudocharis sithon H. Druce, 1884
- Pseudocharis splendens (H. Druce, 1888)
- Pseudocharis translucida Dognin, 1890
- Pseudocharis trigutta (Walker, 1854)
