= Pseudocharis sanguiceps =

Scientific classification
- Kingdom: Animalia
- Phylum: Arthropoda
- Class: Insecta
- Order: Lepidoptera
- Superfamily: Noctuoidea
- Family: Erebidae
- Subfamily: Arctiinae
- Genus: Pseudocharis
- Species: P. sanguiceps

Binomial name
- Pseudocharis sanguiceps (Hampson, 1898)

Synonyms
- Pseudomya sanguiceps Hampson, 1898

Species of moth

Pseudocharis sanguiceps is a moth in the subfamily Arctiinae. It was described by George Hampson in 1898. It is found in Panama.
