= Pseudocharis sithon =

Scientific classification
- Domain: Eukaryota
- Kingdom: Animalia
- Phylum: Arthropoda
- Class: Insecta
- Order: Lepidoptera
- Superfamily: Noctuoidea
- Family: Erebidae
- Subfamily: Arctiinae
- Genus: Pseudocharis
- Species: P. sithon

Binomial name
- Pseudocharis sithon H. Druce, 1884

Species of moth

Pseudocharis sithon is a moth in the subfamily Arctiinae. It was described by Herbert Druce in 1884. It is found in Mexico and Guatemala.
