= Pseudocharis romani =

Scientific classification
- Kingdom: Animalia
- Phylum: Arthropoda
- Clade: Pancrustacea
- Class: Insecta
- Order: Lepidoptera
- Superfamily: Noctuoidea
- Family: Erebidae
- Subfamily: Arctiinae
- Genus: Pseudocharis
- Species: P. romani

Binomial name
- Pseudocharis romani (Bryk, 1953)

Synonyms
- Pseudomya romani Bryk, 1953

Species of moth

Pseudocharis romani is a moth in the subfamily Arctiinae. It was described by Felix Bryk in 1953. It is found in the Amazon region.
