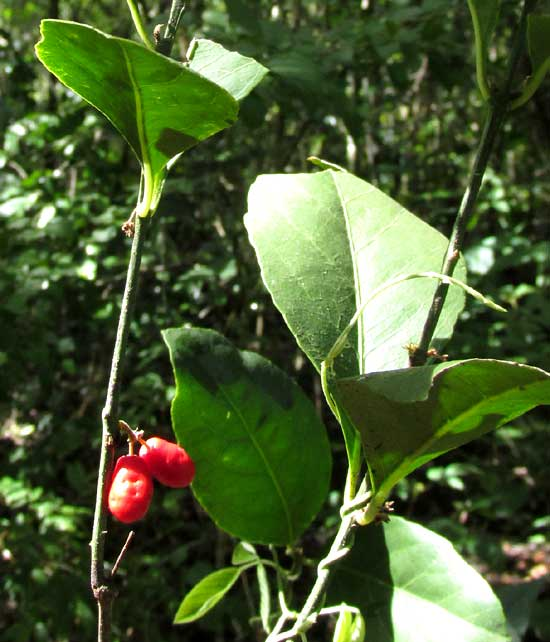
- Leafy stems with fruits

Conservation status
- Least Concern (IUCN 3.1)

Scientific classification
- Kingdom: Plantae
- Clade: Tracheophytes
- Clade: Angiosperms
- Clade: Eudicots
- Clade: Rosids
- Order: Celastrales
- Family: Celastraceae
- Genus: Crossopetalum
- Species: C. gaumeri

Binomial name
- Crossopetalum gaumeri (Loes.) Lundell

Synonyms
- Myginda gaumeri Loes.; Rhacoma gaumeri (Loes.) Standl.

= Crossopetalum gaumeri =

Species of plant

Crossopetalum gaumeri is a shrub species growing mainly in tropical wet forests of southern Mexico and adjacent Central American countries. It belongs to the family Celastraceae.

== Description ==
Here are key features of Crossopetalum gaumeri helping with the species' identification:

- The shrub's stems are 4-cornered, hairless and up to 3 m (10 ft) tall. Generally they are green or red.
- Pairs of leaves on petioles up to 8 mm (3/8 in) long arise opposite one another with blades up to 11 cm (4 1/2 in) long and 4.5 cm (1 3/4 in) wide. Blade margins bear no lobes or indentations, though they can have tiny, widely spaced teeth.
- Inflorescences are cymes with peduncles up to 2 cm (3/4 in) long. Flowers are in clusters up to 4 cm (1 5/8 in) across.
- Flowers on pedicels up to 6 mm (1/4 in) long have four reddish-brown petals up to 1.5 mm (1/16 in) in diameter and 4 rounded sepals about a third as long as the petals; sepals bear short, soft hairs. As with other Crossopetalum species, in the flower's center a short style emerges from the center of a disk- or ring-like, nectar-producing "nectary" about 1 mm (1/32 in) in diameter.
- Fruits are drupe-type, red at maturity, up to 13 mm (1/2 in) long, and about 6.5 mm (1/4 in) wide, broadest above their middles.

== Distribution ==
In southeastern Mexico, Crossopetalum gaumeri occurs in the Yucatan Peninsula. In Central America it is found in Belize and Guatemala. Reports of a disjunct Mexican population in Veracruz state have been determined to be based on a misidentification.

== Habitat ==
In Mexico's Yucatan Peninsula, Crossopetalum gaumeri occurs in both dry forest and moist forest, as well as among coastal dunes and disturbed, weedy areas such as roadsides and agricultural fields.

== Conservation status ==
The IUCN Red List in 2019 listed Crossopetalum gaumeri as a species of Least Concern with a stable population.

== In traditional medicine ==
In Mexico's Yucatan Peninsula the Mayan people use Crossopetalum gaumeri for snakebite as well as for treating illnesses suggesting an infection such as diarrhea, vomiting, colic, fever and sore throat. In fact, root extracts in methanol are shown to contain terpenoid-type metabolites with potential antimicrobial uses.

== Taxonomy ==
In 1898 when Ludwig Eduard Theodor Loesener formally described Crossopetalum gaumeri under the basionym of Myginda gaumeri, his type specimen was from Buena Vista Xbac, Yucatán, México, collected by George Franklin Gaumer, his #1049.

=== Etymology ===
The genus name Crossopetalum is derived from the Greek krossos, meaning "fringe," and petalon, meaning "petal." This alludes to the fringed margins on petals of the type species.

The species name gaumeri honors George Franklin Gaumer, who collected the type specimen

== Gallery ==
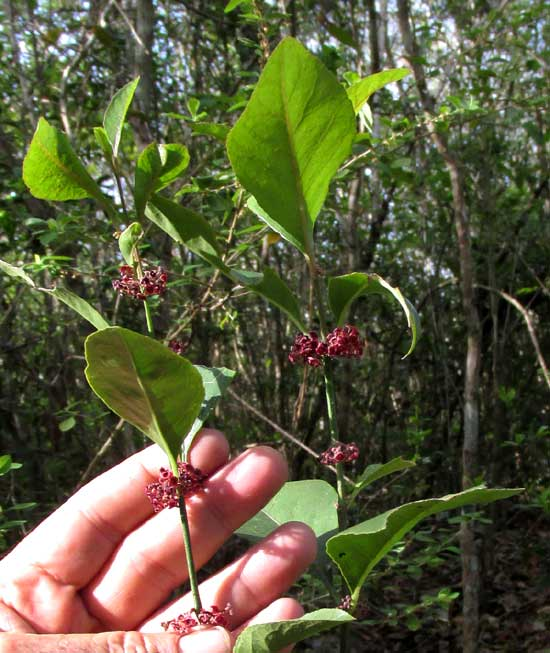
Leafy flowering stems

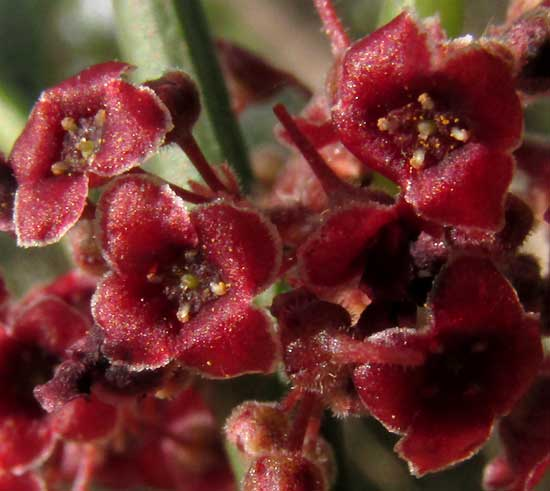
Flowers showing styles emerging above nectaries

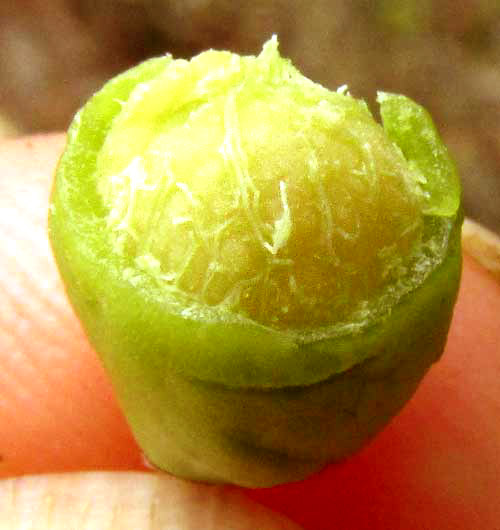
Immature fruit with flesh removed showing one seed

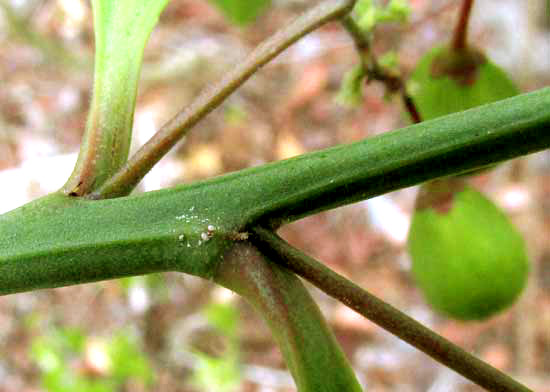
Angled stem
