= Pseudocharis splendens =

Scientific classification
- Domain: Eukaryota
- Kingdom: Animalia
- Phylum: Arthropoda
- Class: Insecta
- Order: Lepidoptera
- Superfamily: Noctuoidea
- Family: Erebidae
- Subfamily: Arctiinae
- Genus: Pseudocharis
- Species: P. splendens

Binomial name
- Pseudocharis splendens (H. Druce, 1888)

Synonyms
- Mastigocera splendens H. Druce, 1888

Species of moth

Pseudocharis splendens is a moth in the subfamily Arctiinae. It was described by Herbert Druce in 1888. It is found in the Bahamas.
