= Pseudocharis trigutta =

Scientific classification
- Kingdom: Animalia
- Phylum: Arthropoda
- Class: Insecta
- Order: Lepidoptera
- Superfamily: Noctuoidea
- Family: Erebidae
- Subfamily: Arctiinae
- Genus: Pseudocharis
- Species: P. trigutta

Binomial name
- Pseudocharis trigutta (Walker, 1854)

Synonyms
- Glaucopis trigutta Walker, 1854

Species of moth

Pseudocharis trigutta is a moth in the subfamily Arctiinae. It was described by Francis Walker in 1854. It is found in Colombia.
