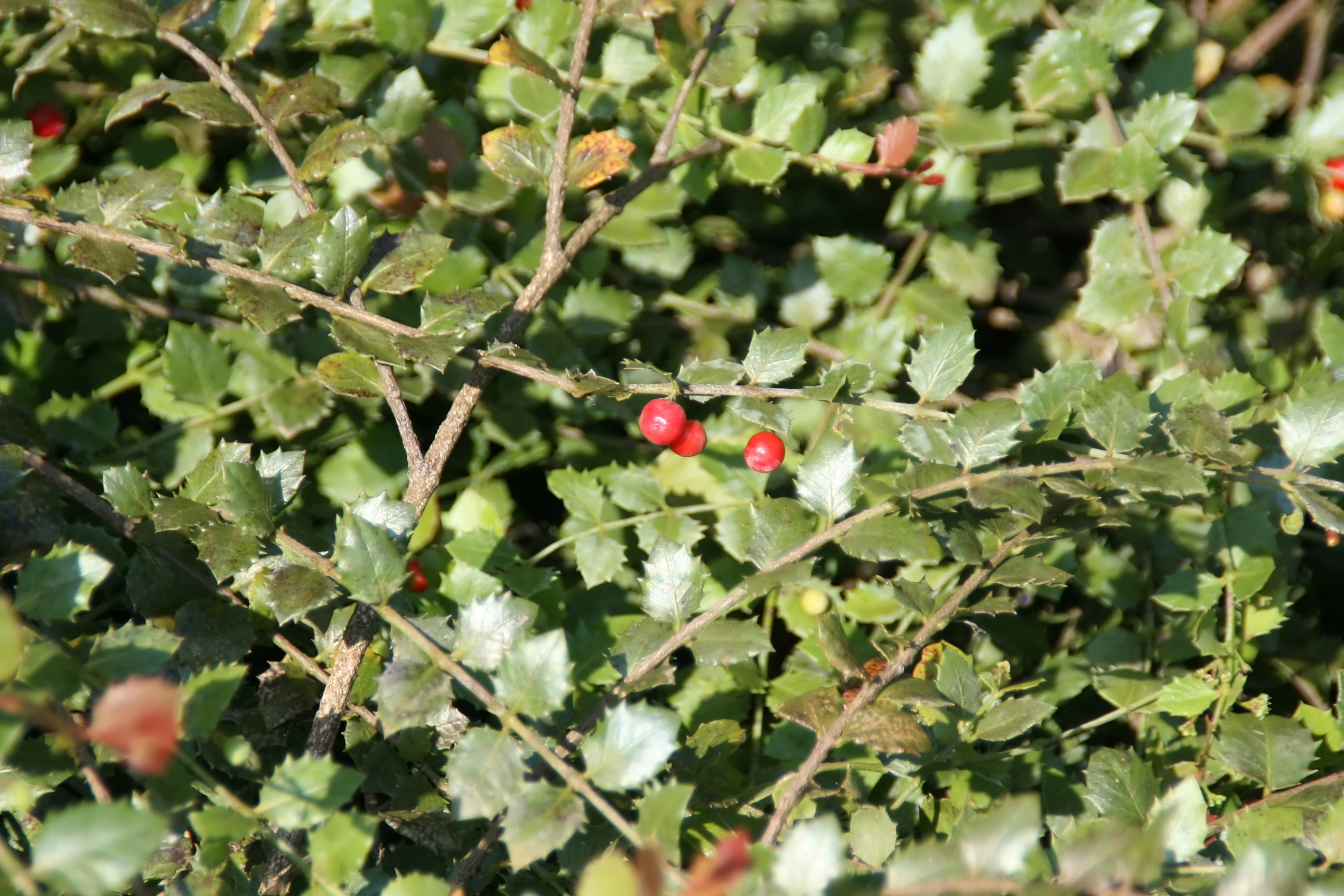

Conservation status
- Vulnerable (NatureServe)

Scientific classification
- Kingdom: Plantae
- Clade: Tracheophytes
- Clade: Angiosperms
- Clade: Eudicots
- Clade: Rosids
- Order: Celastrales
- Family: Celastraceae
- Genus: Crossopetalum
- Species: C. ilicifolium

Binomial name
- Crossopetalum ilicifolium (Poir.) Kuntze

Synonyms
- Crossopetalum floridanum J. R. Gardn.; Myginda ilicifolia Poir.; Rhacoma ilicifolia (Poir.) Trel. .; Rhacoma nana M. Gómez

= Crossopetalum ilicifolium =

Species of flowering plants in the staff vine family Celastraceae

Crossopetalum ilicifolium, commonly known as Christmasberry or holly leaf rhacoma, is a species of plant in the family Celastraceae. It is found in USA (Florida), Haiti, Dominican Republic, Bahamas, and Cuba.
