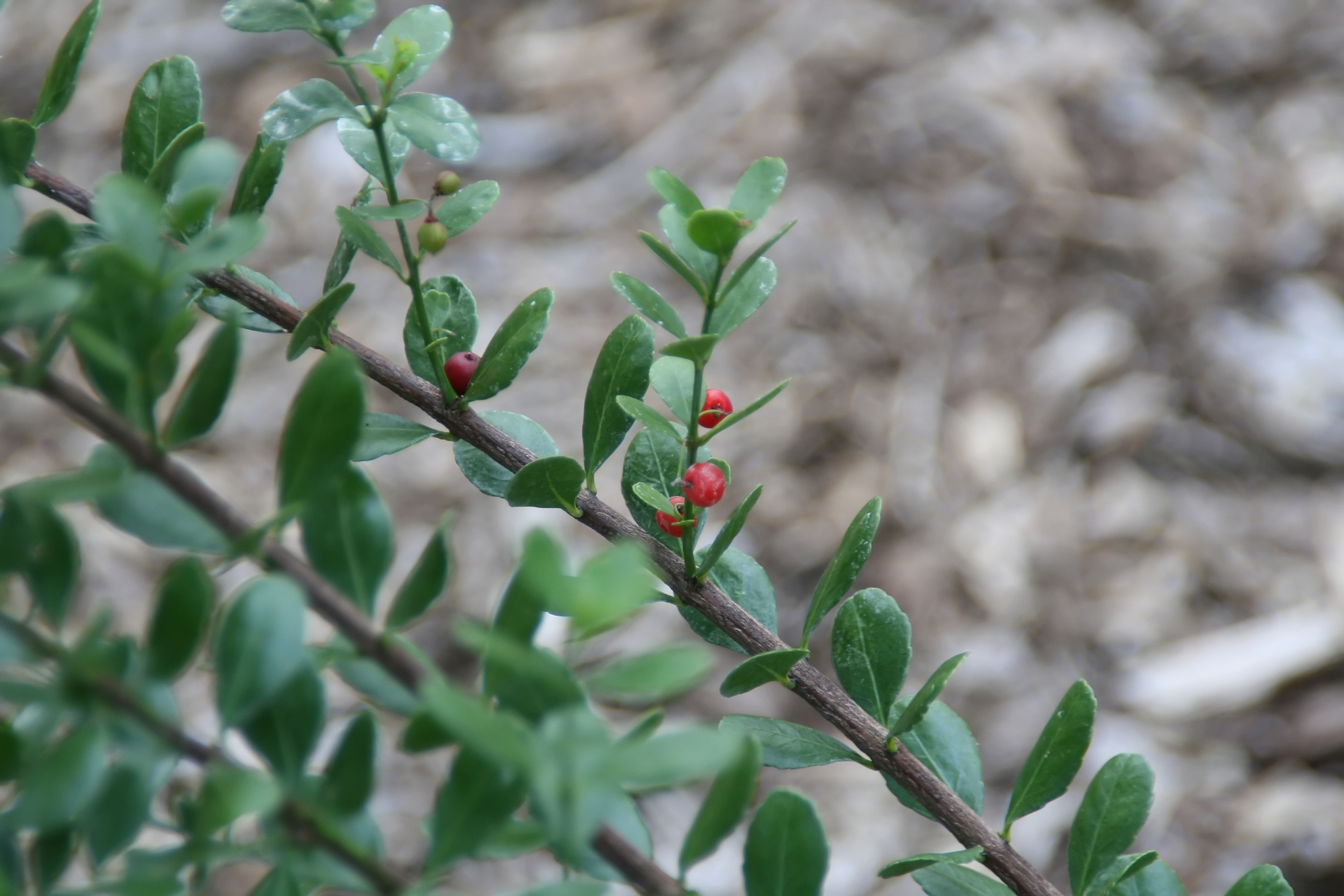
- A species of Crossopetalum, C. rhacoma

Scientific classification
- Kingdom: Plantae
- Clade: Tracheophytes
- Clade: Angiosperms
- Clade: Eudicots
- Clade: Rosids
- Order: Celastrales
- Family: Celastraceae
- Genus: Crossopetalum; P.Browne

Species
- See text.

Synonyms
- Myginda Jacq.; Rhacoma L.

= Crossopetalum =

Maiden berries

Genus of flowering plants in the staff vine family Celastraceae

Crossopetalum, commonly known as Christmas-berries or maiden berries, is a genus of flowering plants in the family Celastraceae. It comprises about 30-40 species.

== Description ==
Crossopetalum taxa are shrubs or trees, with opposite or whorled persistent leaves with petiole and stipules. Inflorescences are axillary, regrouping white, pale green, reddish, or purplish radially symmetric flowers, with four sepals, four petals, and a four-carpellate pistil. Intrastaminal nectaries are annular and fleshy. Fruits are red drupes, with one-two seeds per fruit. It blooms and fruits all year long.

== Etymology ==
The etymology of the genus name Crossopetalum derives from the two Ancient Greek words κροσσός (krossós), meaning "fringe", and πέταλον (pétalon), meaning "leaf of a flower". It alludes to the fimbriate petals of the type species (C. rhacoma).

The synonym name Myginda is a taxonomic anagram derived from the name of the confamilial genus Gyminda. The latter name is a taxonomic patronym honoring Franz von Mygind (1710 - 1789), a Danish-Austrian court official, who traveled to Barbados, collected plants with herbarium specimens hosted in the Hungarian Natural History Museum in Budapest, and was a friend of Nikolaus Joseph von Jacquin.

== Systematics ==
According to Plants of the World Online, 36 species are recognized.

- Crossopetalum aquifolium (Griseb.) Hitchc.
- Crossopetalum bokdamii Breteler & Buerki
- Crossopetalum coriaceum Northr.
- Crossopetalum cristalense Borhidi
- Crossopetalum decussatum (Baill.) Lourteig
- Crossopetalum densiflorum Lundell
- Crossopetalum ekmanii (Urb.) Alain
- Crossopetalum enervium Hammel
- Crossopetalum filipes (Sprague) Lundell
- Crossopetalum gaumeri (Loes.) Lundell
- Crossopetalum glabrum Lundell
- Crossopetalum gomezii Lundell
- Crossopetalum ilicifolium (Poir.) Kuntze
- Crossopetalum lanceifolium (Lundell) Lundell
- Crossopetalum lobatum Lundell
- Crossopetalum macrocarpum (Brandegee) Lundell
- Crossopetalum managuatillo (Loes.) Lundell
- Crossopetalum minimiflorum Lundell
- Crossopetalum mossambicense I.Darbysh.
- Crossopetalum orientale Mory
- Crossopetalum oxyphyllum (S.F.Blake) Lundell
- Crossopetalum panamense Lundell
- Crossopetalum parviflorum (Hemsl.) Lundell
- Crossopetalum parvifolium L.O.Williams
- Crossopetalum pungens (C.Wright) Rothm.
- Crossopetalum rhacoma Crantz
- Crossopetalum riparium (Lundell) Lundell
- Crossopetalum rostratum (Urb.) Rothm.
- Crossopetalum scoparium (Hook. & Arn.) Kuntze
- Crossopetalum serrulatum (Loes.) I.Darbysh.
- Crossopetalum shaferi (Britton & Urb.) Alain
- Crossopetalum standleyi (Lundell) Lundell
- Crossopetalum subsessile L.O.Williams
- Crossopetalum ternifolium (Urb.) Alain
- Crossopetalum theodes (Benth.) Kuntze
- Crossopetalum uragoga (Jacq.) Kuntze
