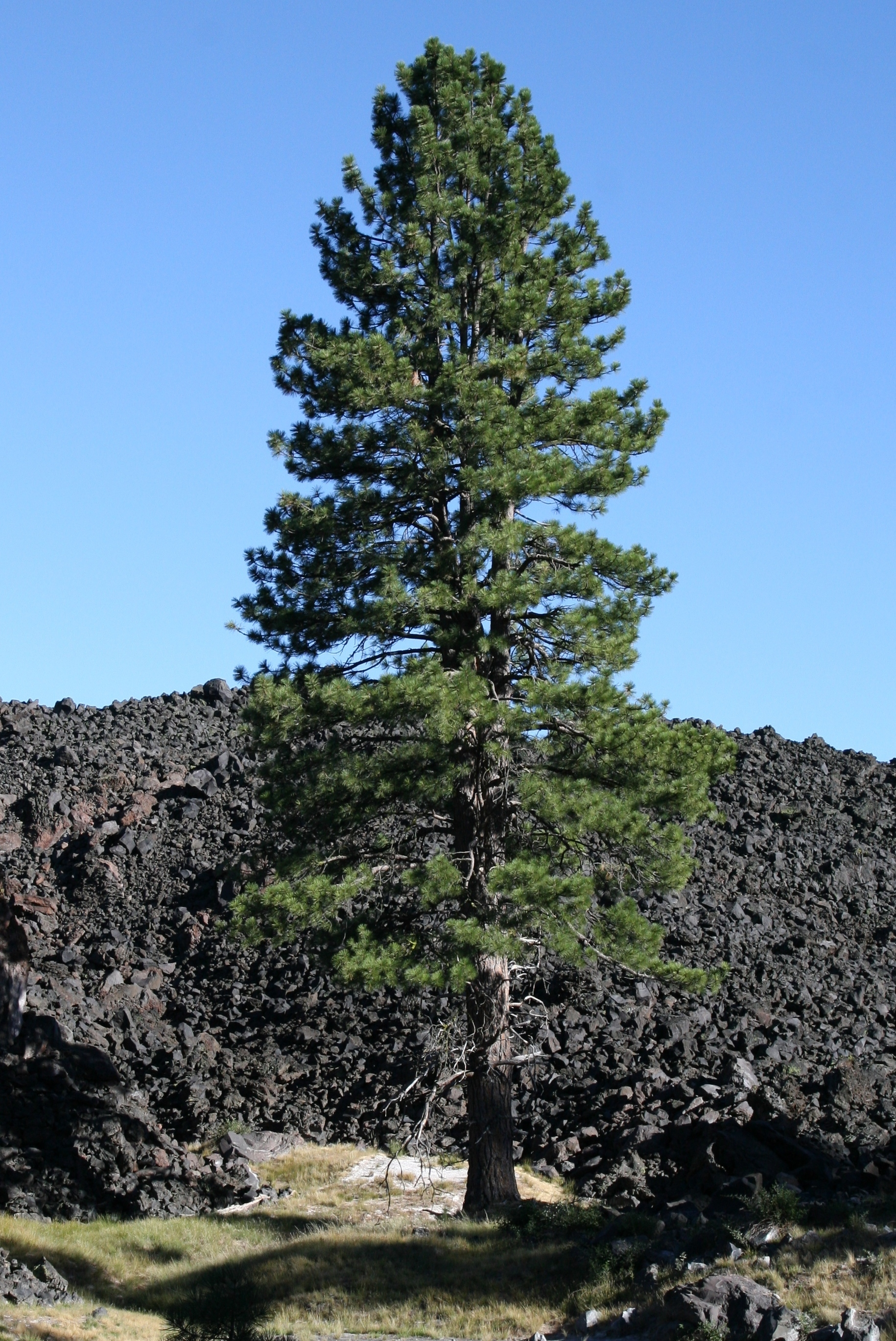
- Pinus jeffreyi

Scientific classification
- Kingdom: Plantae
- Clade: Tracheophytes
- Clade: Gymnosperms
- Division: Pinophyta
- Class: Pinopsida
- Order: Pinales
- Family: Pinaceae
- Subfamily: Pinoideae
- Genus: Pinus; L.

Type species
- Pinus sylvestris L.

Subgenera
- Subgenus Strobus; Subgenus Pinus; See List of Pinus species for complete taxonomy to species level. See list of pines by region for list of species by geographic distribution.
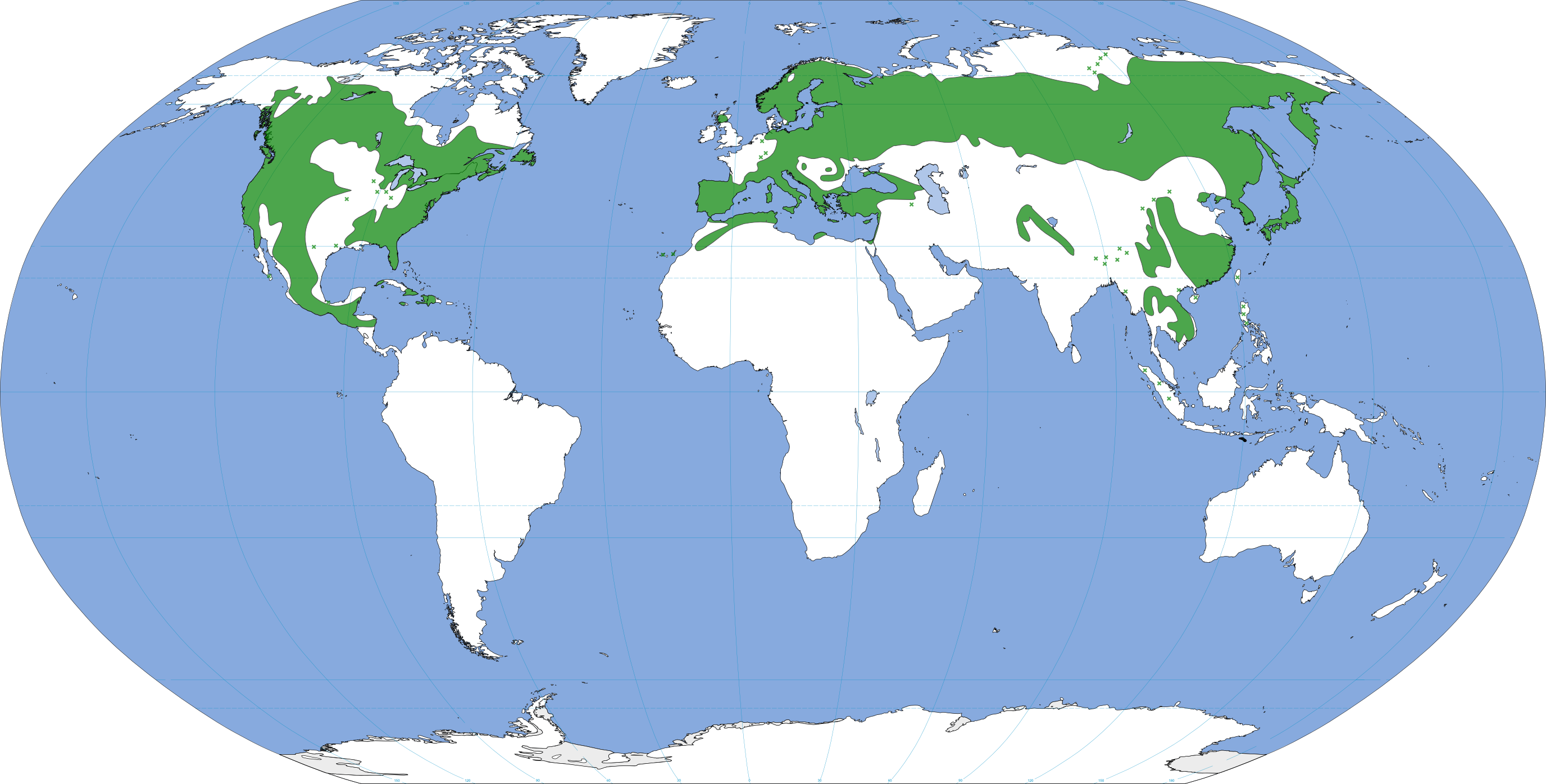
- Pinus distribution: circumpolar, with extensive taiga forest, almost entirely Northern hemisphere

Synonyms
- Apinus de Necker ex Rydberg; Caryopitys Small; Cembra Opiz; Ducampopinus Chevalier; Haploxylon (Koehne) Komarov; Leucopitys Nieuwland; Pinea Wolf ex Opiz; Strobus (Sweet ex Spach) Opiz

= Pine =

Pine Temporal range: Barremian–Present Possible records from Jurassic

Genus of coniferous trees

Pines (genus Pinus (/ˈpaɪ.nəs/) are a genus of conifers in the family Pinaceae. Pinus is the sole genus in the subfamily Pinoideae. The species are trees or shrubs with their leaves in bunches, usually of 2 to 5 needles. The seeds are carried on woody cones, with two seeds to each cone scale.

Pines are widely distributed in the Northern Hemisphere; they occupy large areas of taiga (boreal forest), but are found in many habitats, including the Mediterranean Basin, and dry tropical forests in southeast Asia and Central America. Some are fire-resistant or fire-dependent.

Pine trees provide one of the most extensively used types of timber. The pine nuts are used to make dishes such as pesto, while retsina wine is flavoured with pine resin.

== Description ==
=== Tree ===
Pine trees are coniferous resinous trees (or, rarely, shrubs) growing 3–80 metres (10–260 feet) tall, with the majority of species reaching 15–45 m (50–150 ft) tall. The smallest are Siberian dwarf pine and Potosi pinyon, and the tallest is an 83.45 m (273.8 ft) tall sugar pine (Pinus lambertiana) located in Yosemite National Park.

Pines are long lived and typically reach ages of 100–1,000 years, some even more. The longest-lived is the Great Basin bristlecone pine (Pinus longaeva). One individual in the White Mountains of California, dubbed "Methuselah", is among the world's oldest living organisms at around 4,800 years old. An older tree near Wheeler Peak, now cut down, was dated at 4,900 years old.

The spirals of branches, needles, and cone scales are arranged in Fibonacci number ratios.

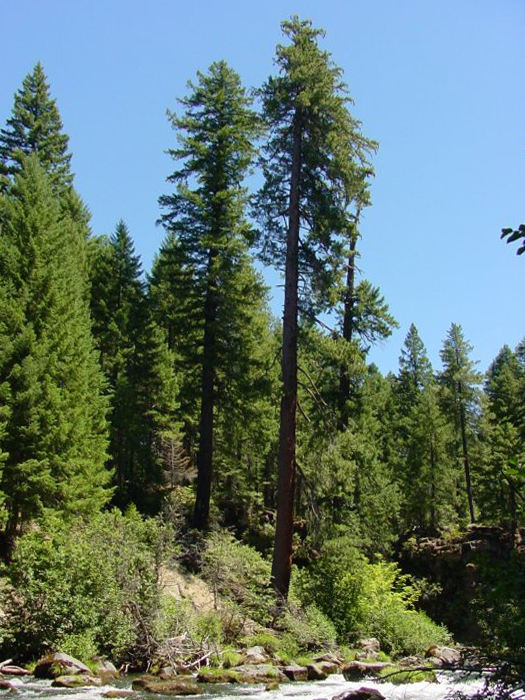
Pinus lambertiana is the tallest pine species.

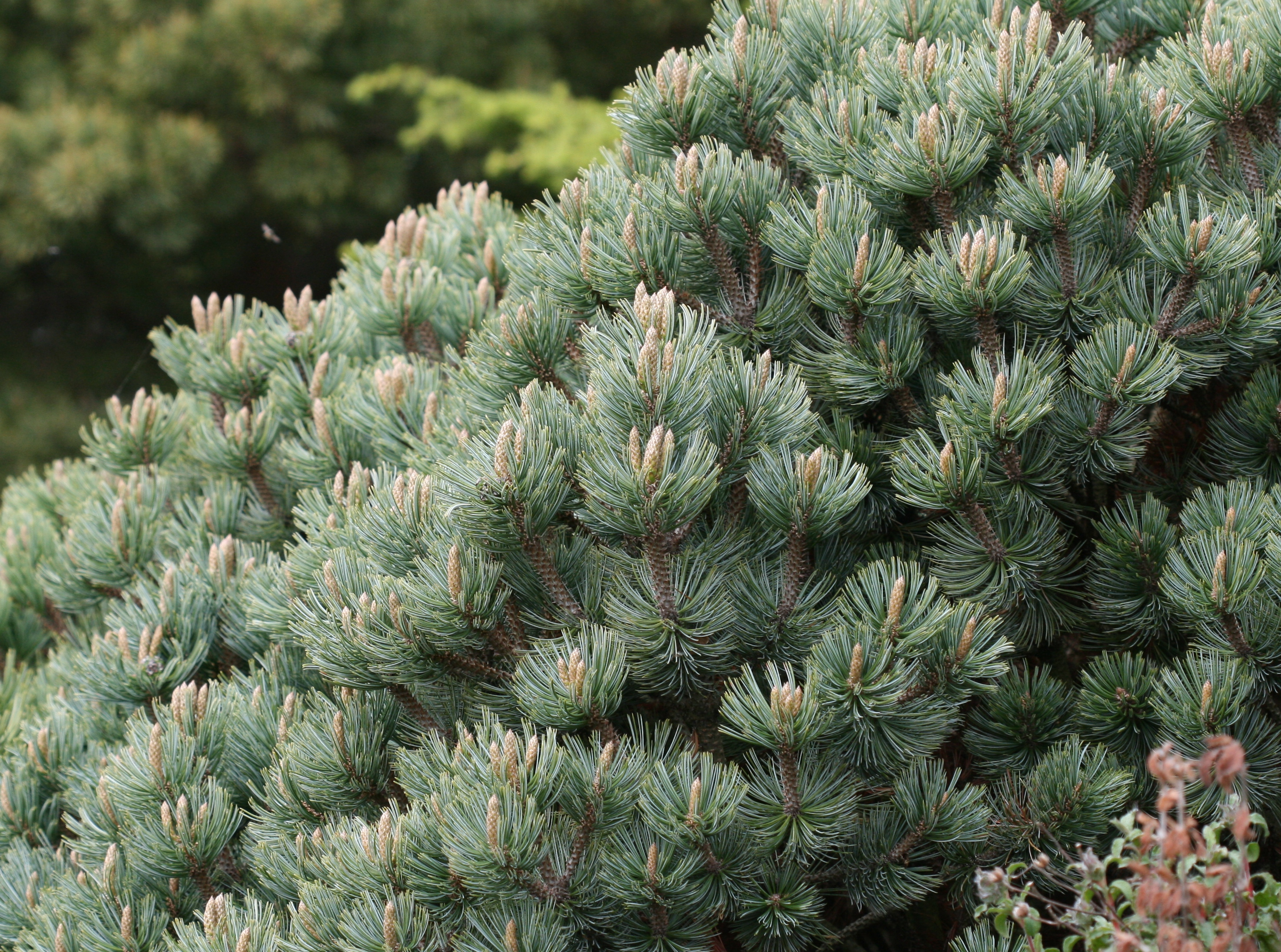
Pinus culminicola is a low-growing shrub, among the shortest pines.

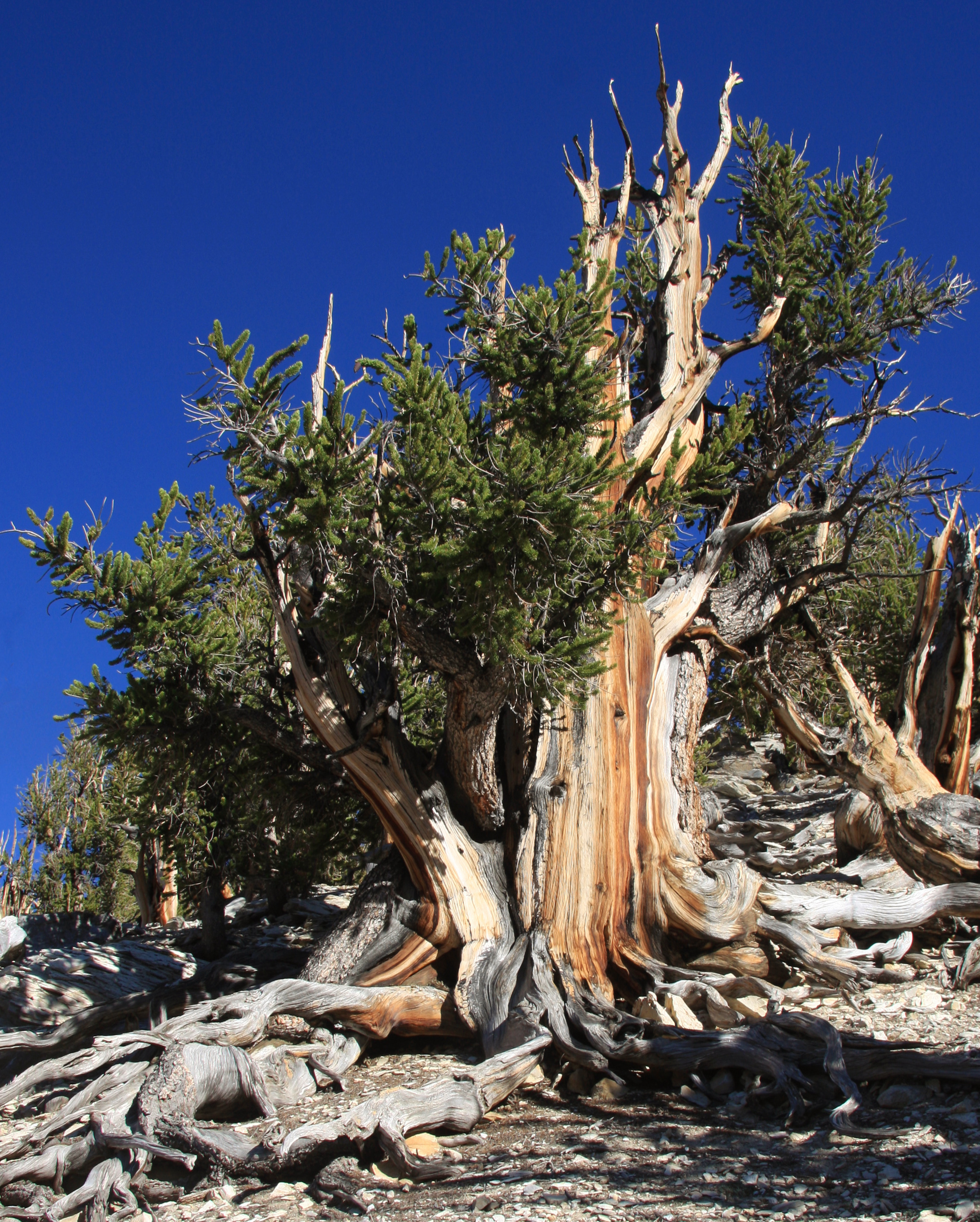
Ancient Pinus longaeva, among the oldest of all trees

=== Bark ===
The bark of most pines is thick and scaly, but some species have thin, flaky bark. The branches are produced in "pseudo-whorls", actually a very tight spiral but appearing like a ring of branches arising from the same point. Many pines are uninodal, producing just one such whorl of branches each year, from buds at the tip of the year's new shoot, but others are multinodal, producing two or more whorls of branches per year.

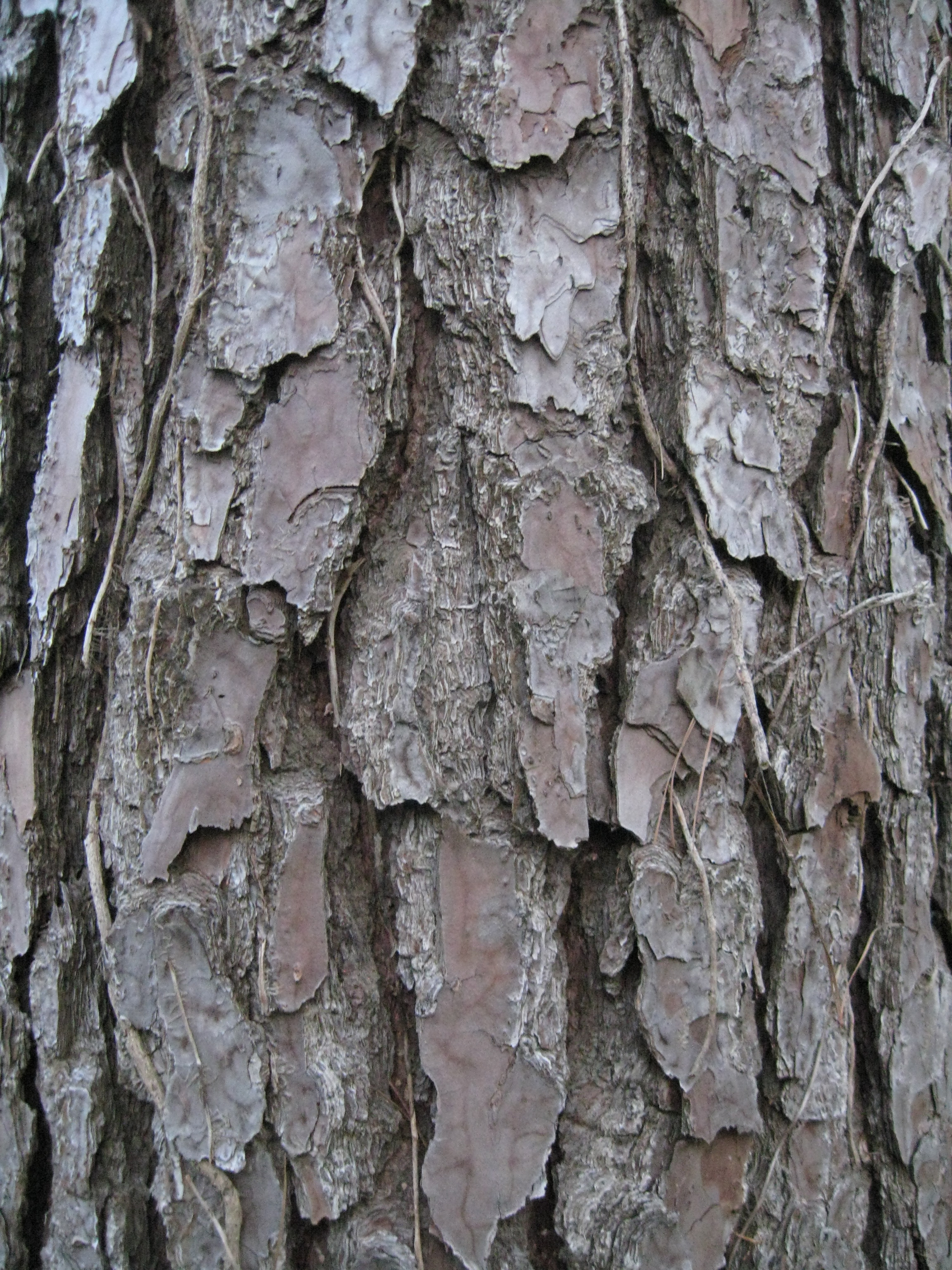
Many pines, like Pinus taeda, have thick bark that flakes into scales.

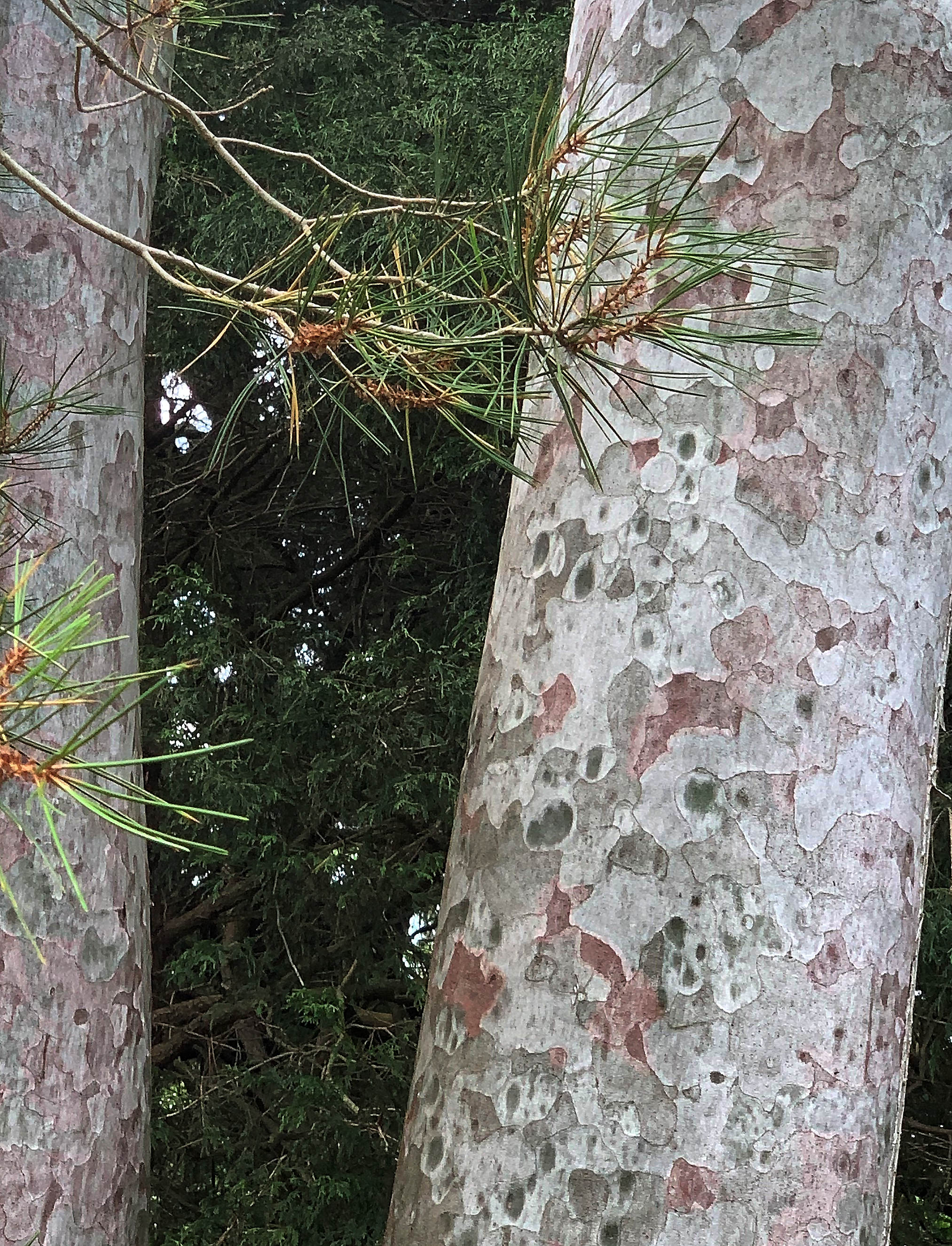
Some species, like Pinus bungeana, have thin bark.

=== Foliage ===
Pines have four types of leaf:

- Seed leaves (cotyledons) on seedlings are borne in a whorl of 4–24.
- Juvenile leaves, which follow immediately on seedlings and young plants, are 2–6 centimetres (3/4–2 1/4 inches) long, single, green or often blue-green, and arranged spirally on the shoot. These are produced for six months to five years, rarely longer.
- Scale leaves, similar to bud scales, are small, brown and not photosynthetic, and arranged spirally like the juvenile leaves.
- Needles, the adult leaves, are green (photosynthetic) and bundled in clusters called fascicles. The needles can number from one to seven per fascicle, but generally number from two to five. Each fascicle is produced from a small bud on a dwarf shoot in the axil of a scale leaf. These bud scales often remain on the fascicle as a basal sheath. The needles persist for 1.5–40 years, depending on species. If a shoot's growing tip is damaged (e.g. eaten by an animal), the needle fascicles just below the damage generate a stem-producing bud, which can then replace the lost growth tip.
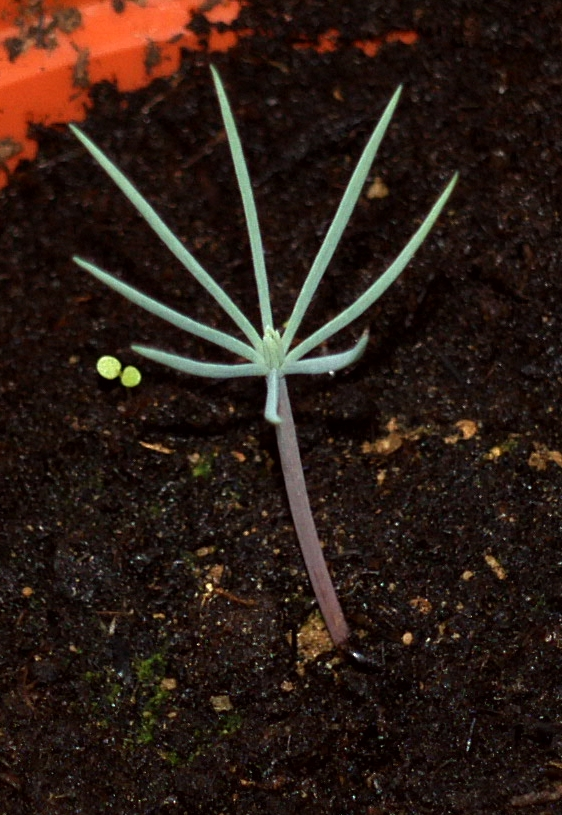
Pinus halepensis seed leaf

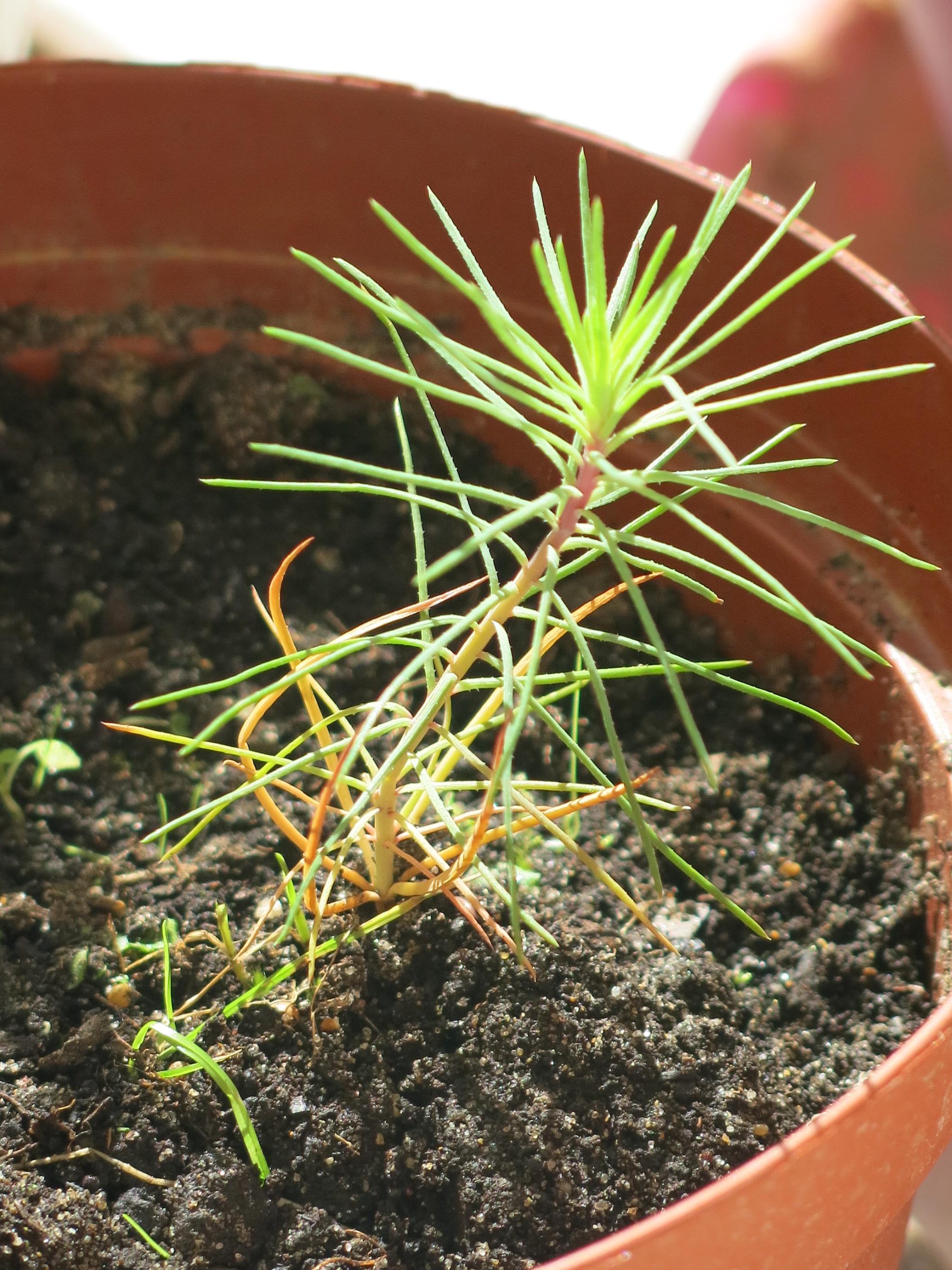
Juvenile leaves of seedling
Pinus pinaster, single and arranged spirally

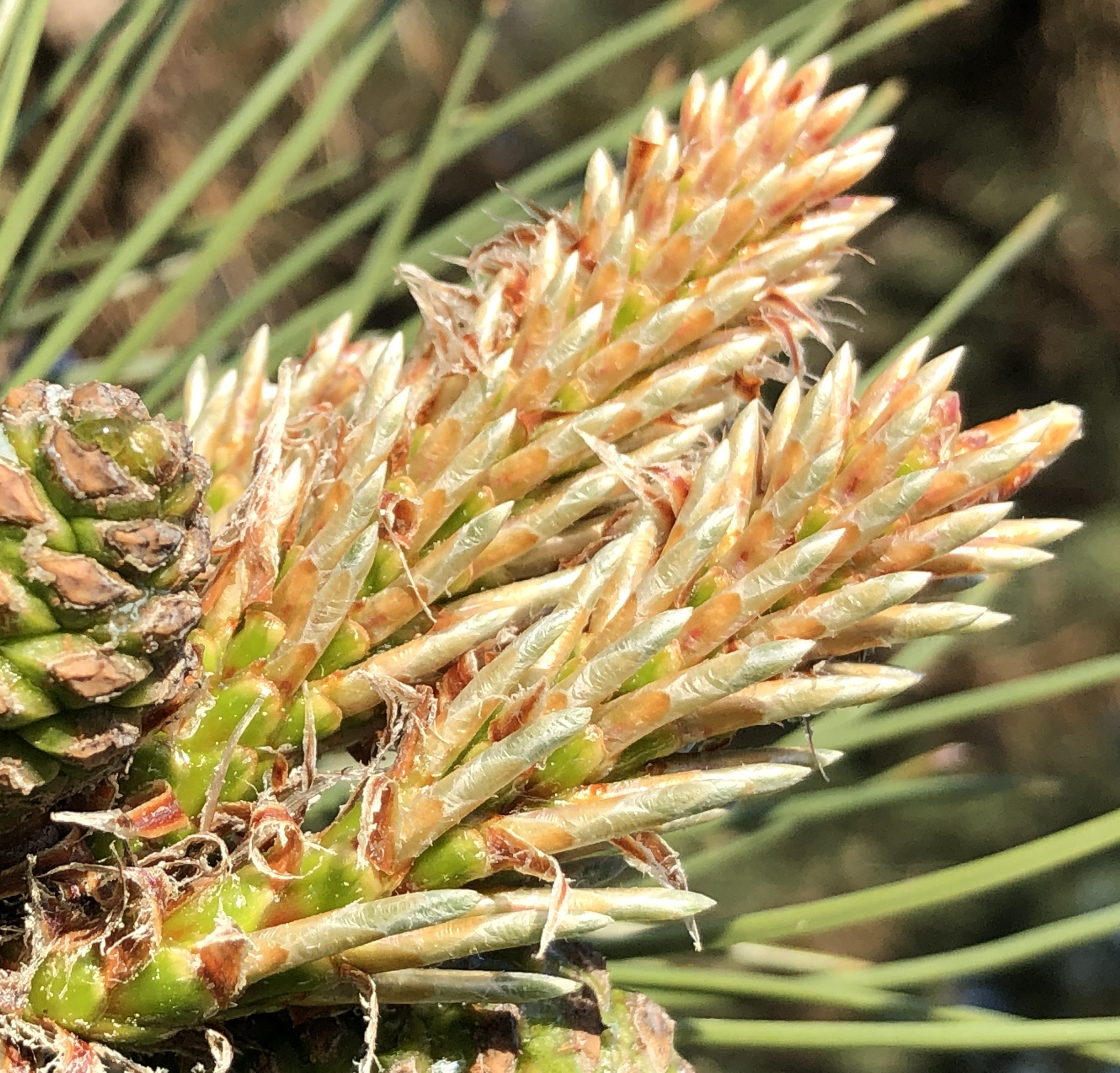
Pinus nigra growth candles covered with thin brownish scale leaves

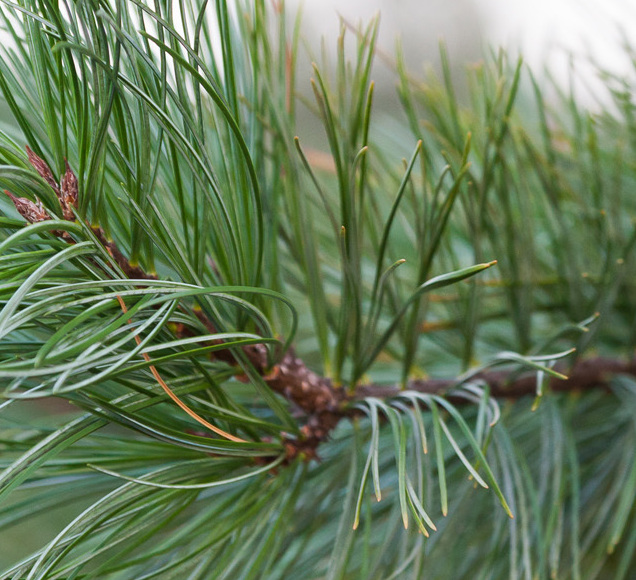
Pinus parviflora needles, in bunches of five in this species

=== Cones ===
Pines are monoecious, having the male and female cones on the same tree. The male cones are small, typically 1–5 cm long, and only present for a short period (usually in spring, though autumn in a few pines), falling as soon as they have shed their pollen. The female cones take 1.5–3 years (depending on species) to mature after pollination, with actual fertilisation delayed one year. At maturity, the female cones are 3–60 cm long. Each cone has numerous spirally-arranged scales, with two seeds on each fertile scale; the scales at the base and tip of the cone are small and sterile without seeds.

The seeds (pine nuts) are mostly small and winged, and are anemochorous (wind-dispersed). Some are larger, have only a vestigial wing, and are bird-dispersed. Female cones are woody and sometimes armed to protect developing seeds from foragers. At maturity, the cones usually open to release the seeds. In some of the bird-dispersed species, for example whitebark pine, the seeds are only released by the bird breaking the cones open. In others, the seeds are stored in closed cones for many years until an environmental cue triggers the cones to open, releasing the seeds. This is called serotiny. The most common form of serotiny is pyriscence, in which resin binds the cones shut until the resin is melted by a forest fire, for example in P. radiata and P. muricata. The seeds are then released after the fire, enabling them to colonise the burnt ground with minimal competition from other plants.

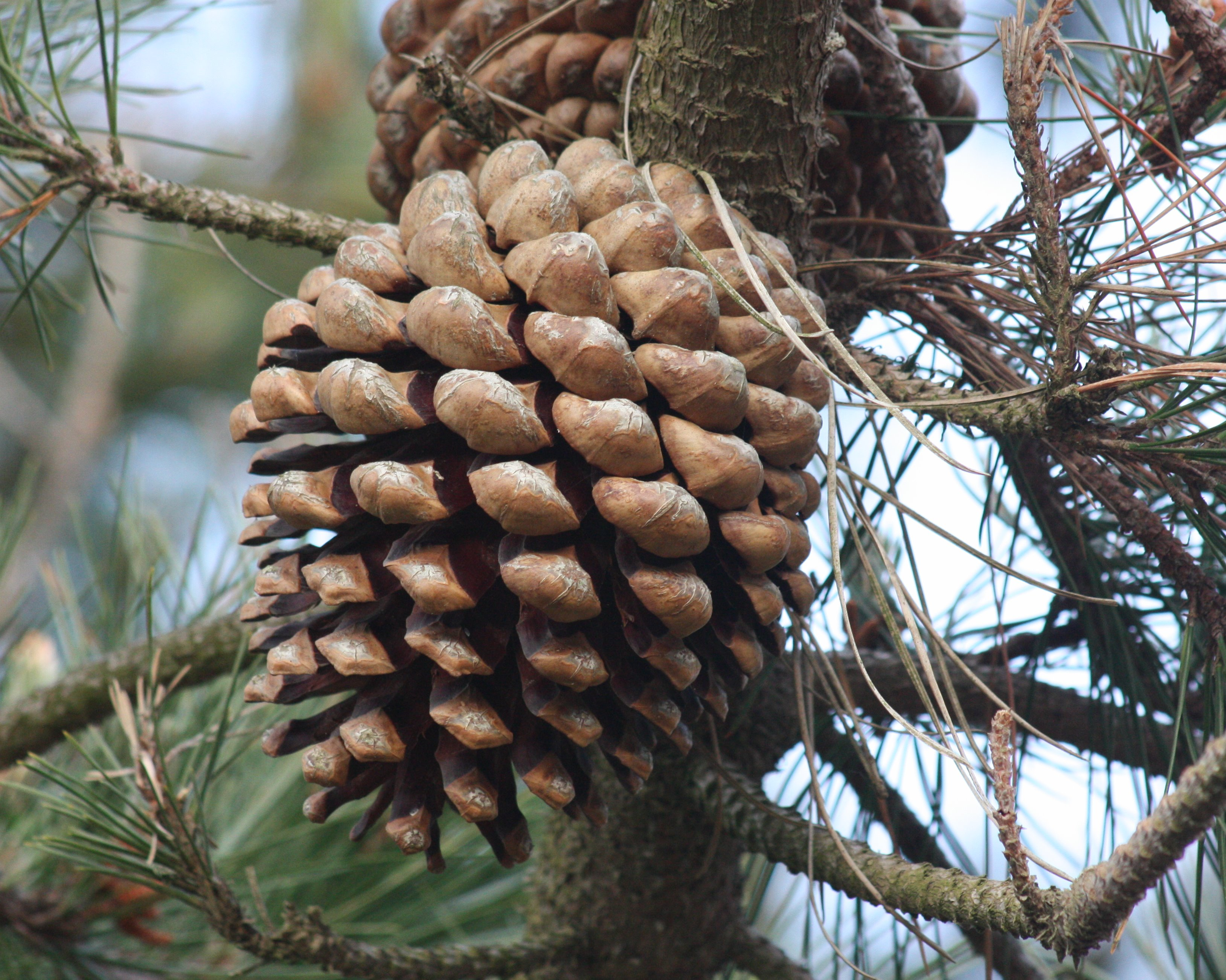
Pinus radiata female (seed) cone

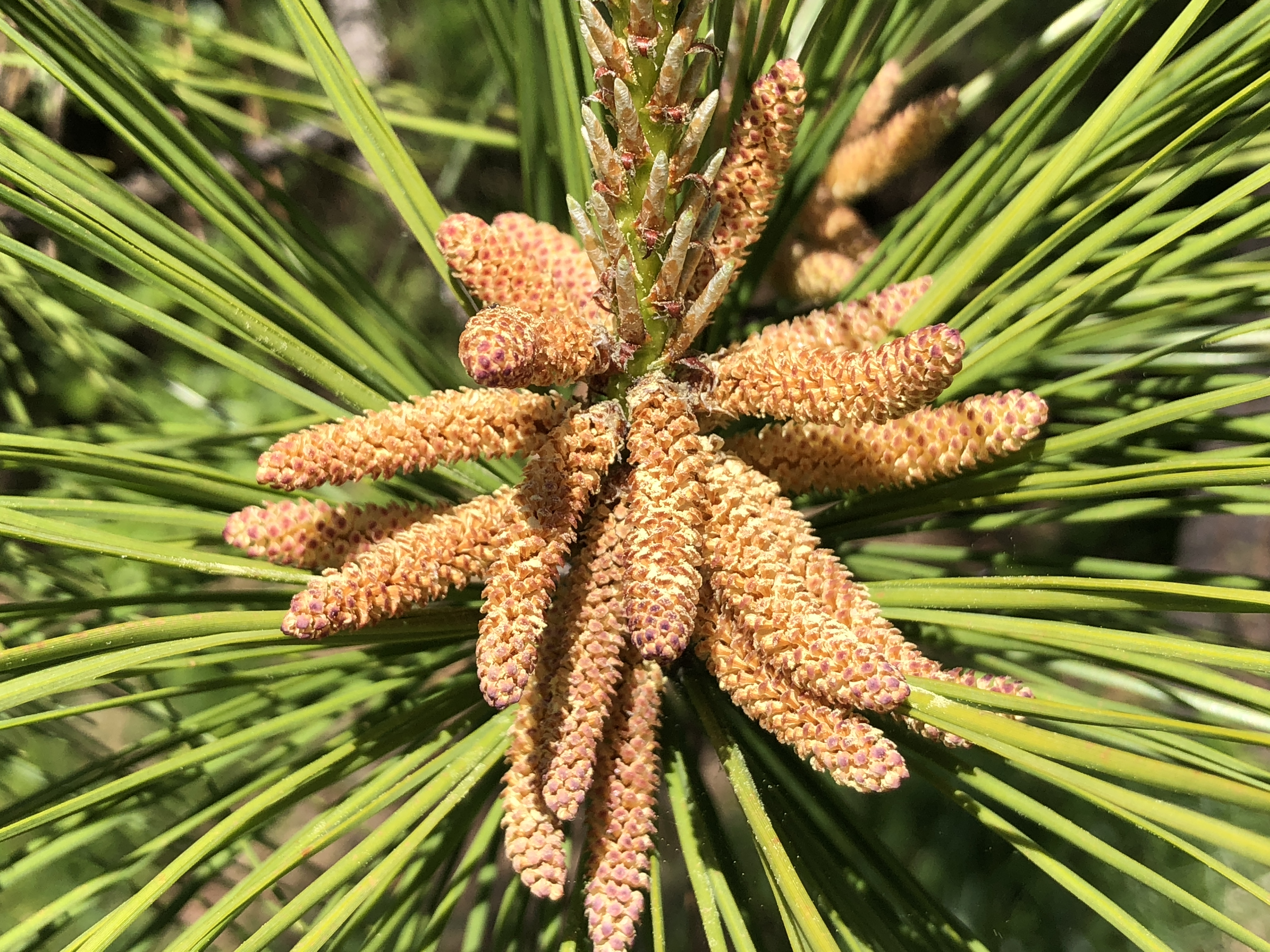
Pinus taeda male (pollen) cones

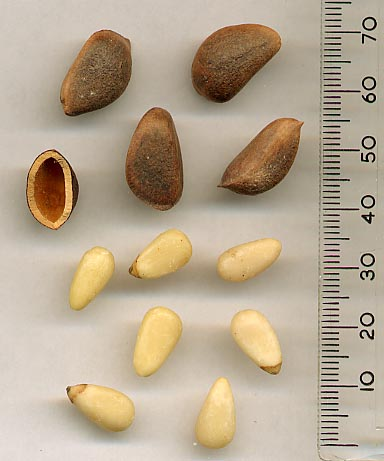
Pinus koraiensis seeds

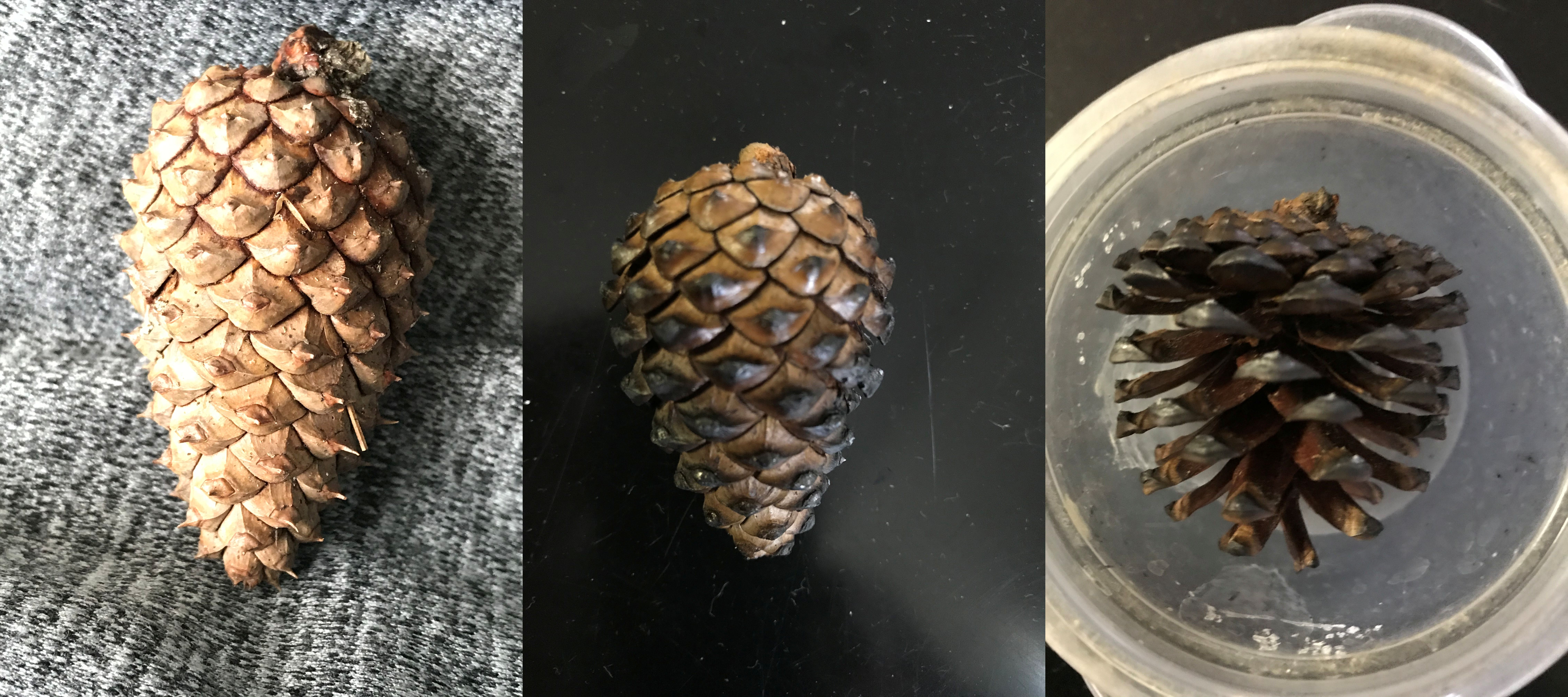
Pinus rigida cones open when exposed to fire. (left to right: before; after; 24 hours later)

== Naming ==
The modern English name "pine" derives from Latin pinus, traced to the Indo-European base *pīt- 'resin'. Before the 19th century, pines were often called firs, a name now applied to another genus, Abies. In some European languages, Germanic cognates of the Old Norse name are still in use for pines, as in Danish fyr and German Föhre. The genus Pinus was named by Carl Linnaeus in 1753. Pinus sylvestris, the Scots pine, was later chosen as the type species.

Several other conifers are commonly known as pines, such as the Norfolk Island pine (Araucaria heterophylla); however, they belong to other genera.

== Evolution ==
=== Fossil history ===
The Pinaceae, the pine family, first appeared in the Jurassic period. The genus Pinus first appeared during the Early Cretaceous; the oldest verified fossil is Pinus yorkshirensis from the Hauterivian-Barremian boundary (~130-125 million years ago) from the Speeton Clay, England. However, there are possible records of the genus from the Jurassic.

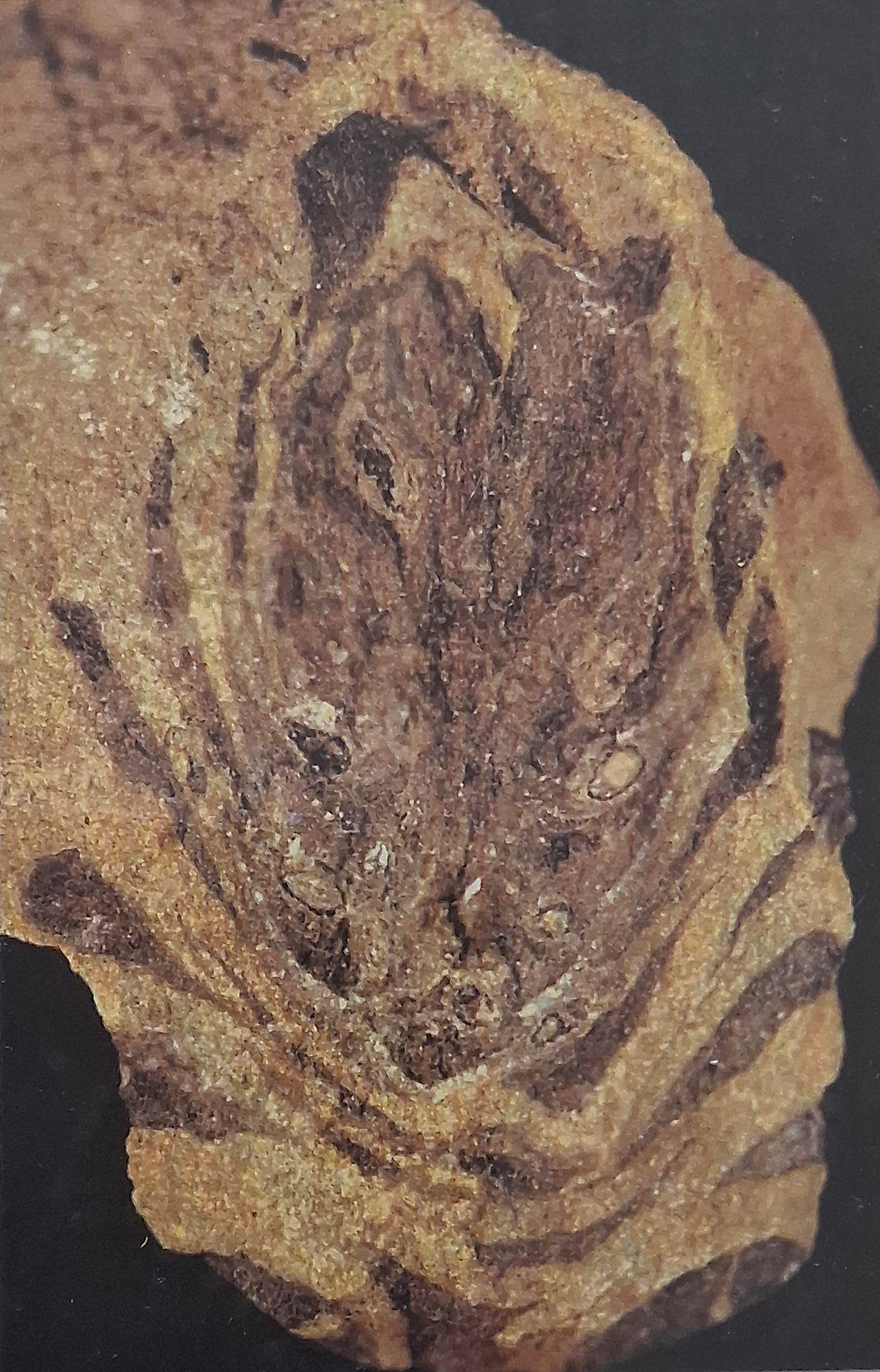
Oldest pine fossil: Pinus yorkshirensis cone. Early Cretaceous, 131–129 mya

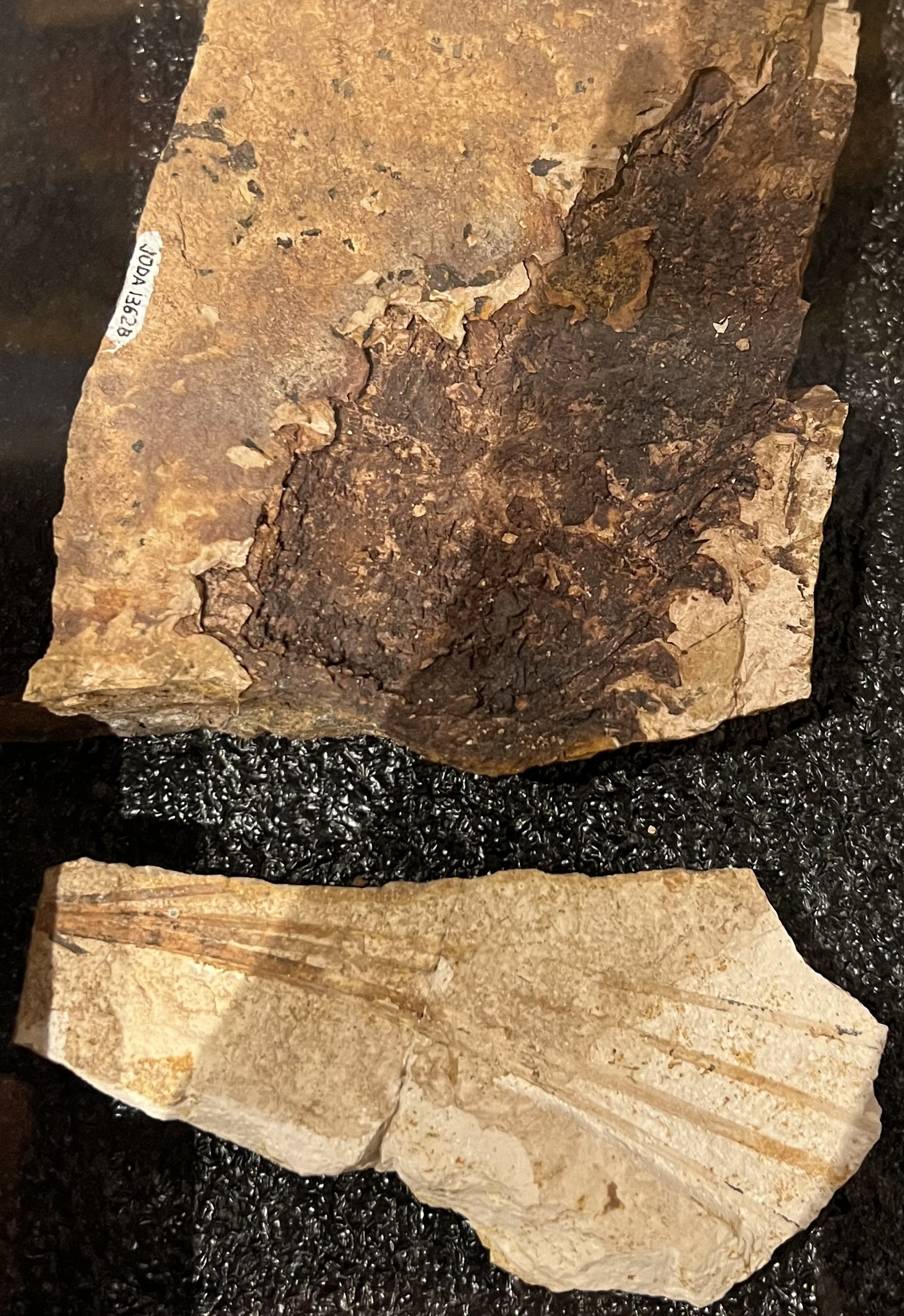
Fossil cone and needles of Pinus johndayensis, Oligocene, 33 mya

=== External phylogeny ===
Based on transcriptome analysis, Pinus is most closely related to the genus Cathaya, which in turn is closely related to the genus Picea, the spruces. These genera, with firs and larches, form the pinoid clade of the Pinaceae.

- Pinaceae
  - Abietoideae (firs, cedars, hemlocks)
  - Pinoideae
    - Lariceae
      - Pseudotsuga (Douglas firs)
      - Larix (larches)
    - Pineae
      - - Cathaya (1 sp.)
        - Picea (spruces)
      - Pinus

=== Internal phylogeny ===
The evolutionary history of the genus Pinus has been complicated by hybridisation. Pines are prone to inter-specific breeding. Wind pollination, long life spans, overlapping generations, large population size, and weak reproductive isolation make breeding across species more likely. As the pines have diversified, gene transfer between different species has created a complex history of genetic relatedness. Research using large genetic datasets has clarified these relationships. Two 21st-century phylogenies are given below; the differences between them demonstrate these complications:

Jin et al. 2021

- Pinus
  - (Strobus)
    - section Parrya
      - - subsection Nelsonii
          P. nelsonii
        - subsection Balfouriana
          - P. aristata
          - - P. balfouriana
            - P. longaeva
      - - subsection Cembroides
          - - - P. pinceana
              - P. maximartinezii
            - P. rzedowskii
          - - - P. quadrifolia
              - P. monophylla
            - - - - P. culminicola
                  - P. discolor
                - P. remota
              - - P. edulis
                - P. cembroides
    - section Quinquefoliae
      - - subsection Gerardiana
          - P. bungeana
          - - P. squamata
            - P. gerardiana
      - - subsection Krempfii
          P. krempfii
        - subsection Strobus
          - P. peuce
          - - - P. lambertiana
              - - - P. strobus
                  - P. chiapensis
                - - P. monticola
                  - - P. flexilis
                    - - P. strobiformis
                      - P. ayacahuite
            - - - P. albicaulis
                - - P. koraiensis
                  - - P. sibirica
                    - P. cembra
              - - P. parviflora
                - - P. wallichiana
                  - - - - P. armandii
                        - P. dabeshanensis
                      - - P. fenzeliana
                        - P. mastersiana
                    - - P. bhutanica
                      - - P. morrisonicola
                        - - P. wangii
                          - - P. kwangtungensis
                            - P. dalatensis
  - (Pinus)
    - section Pinus
      - subsection Pinaster
        - P. heldreichii
        - - P. pinaster
          - - - P. halepensis
              - P. brutia
            - - P. pinea
              - - P. canariensis
                - P. roxburghii
      - subsection Pinus
        - - P. latteri
          - P. merkusii
        - - P. resinosa
          - - P. nigra
            - - - P. densiflora
                - - P. sylvestris
                  - - P. mugo
                    - P. uncinata
              - - - P. massoniana
                  - - P. thunbergii
                    - P. luchuensis
                - - - P. kesiya
                    - - P. yunnanensis
                      - P. densata
                  - - - P. henryi
                      - P. tabuliformis
                    - - P. hwangshanensis
                      - P. taiwanensis
    - section Trifoliae
      - - subsection Sabiniana
          - P. jeffreyi
          - - P. coulteri
            - - P. torreyana
              - P. sabiniana
      - - - subsection Ponderosae
            - - P. washoensis
              - P. ponderosa
            - - P. hartwegii
              - - - P. engelmannii
                  - - P. durangensis
                    - P. arizonica
                - - - P. devoniana
                    - P. montezumae
                  - - P. pseudostrobus
                    - - P. gordoniana
                      - P. maximinoi
        - - - subsection Attenuata
              - - P. radiata
                - P. attenuata
              - P. muricata
          - - subsection Contorta
              - - P. contorta
                - P. banksiana
              - - P. virginiana
                - P. clausa
            - subsection Australes
              - - P. pungens
                - - P. serotina
                  - P. rigida
              - - P. glabra
                - - - P. taeda
                    - P. echinata
                  - - - P. elliottii
                      - P. palustris
                    - - P. caribaea
                      - - - P. oocarpa
                          - P. tecunumanii
                        - - - P. greggii
                            - - P. patula
                              - P. teocote
                          - - - P. lawsonii
                              - - P. herrerae
                                - P. pringlei
                            - - - P. leiophylla
                                - P. lumholtzii
                              - - - P. praetermissa
                                  - P. jaliscana
                                - - P. luzmariae
                                  - P. georginae

Stull et al. 2021

- Pinus
  - (Strobus)
    - section Parrya
      - - subsection Nelsonii
          P. nelsonii
        - subsection Balfouriana
          - P. aristata
          - - P. balfouriana
            - P. longaeva
      - - subsection Cembroides
          - - P. monophylla
            - - P. juarezensis
              - P. quadrifolia
          - - - P. pinceana
              - P. maximartinezii
            - - P. rzedowskii
              - - P. edulis
                - - - P. discolor
                    - P. johannis
                  - - P. culminicola
                    - - P. cembroides
                      - P. remota
    - section Quinquefoliae
      - - subsection Gerardiana
          - P. bungeana
          - P. gerardiana
      - - subsection Krempfii
          P. krempfii
        - subsection Strobus
          - - series Macedonia
              P. peuce
          - - - series Strobi
                - P. strobus
                - - P. flexilis
                  - - P. ayacahuite
                    - P. strobiformis
            - - series Cembrae
                - P. parviflora
                - - P. monticola
                  - - P. cembra
                    - - P. lambertiana
                      - - P. albicaulis
                        - P. dalatensis
              - series Pumilae
                - P. pumila
                - - P. wallichiana
                  - - - P. koraiensis
                      - P. sibirica
                    - - P. squamata
                      - - P. morrisonicola
                        - - P. armandii
                          - - P. fenzeliana
                            - - P. kwangtungensis
                              - - P. bhutanica
                                - P. wangii
  - (Pinus)
    - section Pinus
      - subsection Pinaster
        - P. heldreichii
        - - - P. halepensis
            - P. brutia
          - - - P. pinaster
              - P. pinea
            - - P. canariensis
              - P. roxburghii
      - subsection Pinus
        - - series Pinus
            - - P. densata
              - - P. latteri
                - P. kesiya
            - - - P. nigra
                - P. resinosa
              - - P. sylvestris
                - - P. mugo
                  - P. uncinata
        - - series Tropicales
            - P. tropicalis
            - - P. hwangshanensis
              - - P. massoniana
                - P. merkusii
          - series Tabuliformes
            - P. densiflora
            - - - P. thunbergii
                - P. taiwanensis
              - - P. yunnanensis
                - - P. luchuensis
                  - P. tabuliformis
    - section Trifoliae
      - - subsection Contorta
          - P. virginiana
          - - P. contorta
            - P. clausa
      - - - subsection Ponderosae
            - P. maximinoi
            - - P. montezumae
              - - - P. sabiniana
                  - P. torreyana
                - - P. ponderosa
                  - - - P. gordoniana
                      - P. yecorensis
                    - - P. cooperi
                      - - P. durangensis
                        - - P. nubicola
                          - - P. coulteri
                            - - - P. jeffreyi
                                - P. washoensis
                              - - P. arizonica
                                - - P. engelmannii
                                  - - P. devoniana
                                    - - P. hartwegii
                                      - P. pseudostrobus
        - - subsection Attenuata
            - series Leiophyllae
              - P. patula
              - P. leiophylla
            - series Attenuatae
              - P. tecunumanii
              - - P. muricata
                - - P. radiata
                  - - P. attenuata
                    - P. glabra
          - subsection Australes
            - - series Palustres
                - P. herrerae
                - - P. caribaea
                  - - P. palustris
                    - - P. echinata
                      - P. occidentalis
            - - P. praetermissa
              - - series Taeda
                  - P. serotina
                  - - P. rigida
                    - - P. pungens
                      - P. taeda
                - series Oocarpae
                  - P. elliottii
                  - - - P. teocote
                      - - P. greggii
                        - P. lumholtzii
                    - - P. jaliscana
                      - - P. luzmariae
                        - - P. georginae
                          - - P. maestrensis
                            - - P. pringlei
                              - - P. lawsonii
                                - - P. cubensis
                                  - P. oocarpa

=== Taxonomy ===
Pines are gymnosperms. The genus is divided into two subgenera based on the number of fibrovascular bundles in the needle, and the presence or absence of a resin seal on the scales of the mature cones before opening. The subgenera can be distinguished by cone, seed, and leaf characters:

- Pinus subg. Pinus, the yellow, or hard pine group, with cones with a resin seal on the scales, and generally with harder wood; the needle fascicles mostly have a persistent sheath (two exceptions, Pinus leiophylla and Pinus lumholtzii, have deciduous sheaths).
- Pinus subg. Strobus, syn. Pinus subg. Ducampopinus, the white or soft pine, and pinyon pine groups, with cones without a resin seal on the scales, and usually have softer wood; the needle fascicles mostly have a deciduous sheath (one exception, Pinus nelsonii, has a persistent sheath).

Phylogenetic evidence indicates that the subgenera diverged anciently from one another. Each subgenus is further divided into sections and subsections.

World Flora Online accepts 134 species-rank taxa (119 species and 15 nothospecies) of pines as current, with additional synonyms, and Plants of the World Online 126 species-rank taxa (113 species and 13 nothospecies), making it the largest genus among the conifers. The highest species diversity of pines is found in Mexico.

== Distribution ==
Pines are native to the Northern Hemisphere, with the most species in North America, some in Asia, and a few in Europe. Only two species, Pinus sylvestris and Pinus sibirica, occur in more than one of those regions (Asia and Europe). They occupy large areas of boreal forest (taiga) in latitudes between 50° and 60° N; about a third of this biome is in North America and Scandinavia, the rest in Siberia. The northernmost species is Scots pine, reaching just north of 70° N in Stabbursdalen National Park in Norway. One species, Pinus merkusii, crosses the equator in Sumatra to 2°S. In North America, various species occur in regions at latitudes from as far north as 66° N to as far south as 12°N.

Various species have been introduced to temperate and subtropical regions of both hemispheres, where they are grown as timber or cultivated as ornamental plants in parks and gardens. A number of such introduced species have become naturalised, and species such as Pinus radiata are considered invasive in some regions.

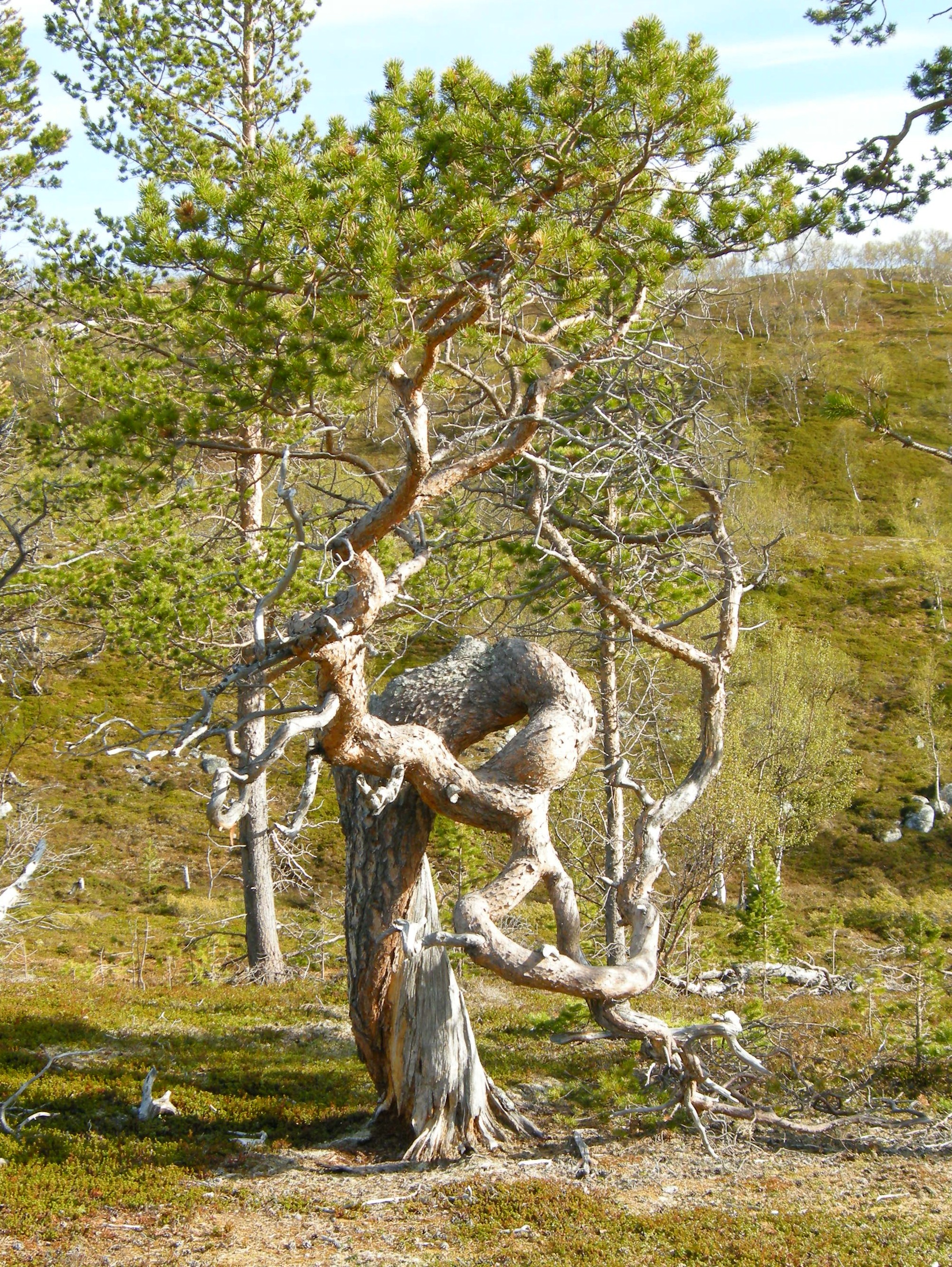
Most northerly: Pinus sylvestris in Stabbursdalen National Park, Norway, at 70° North

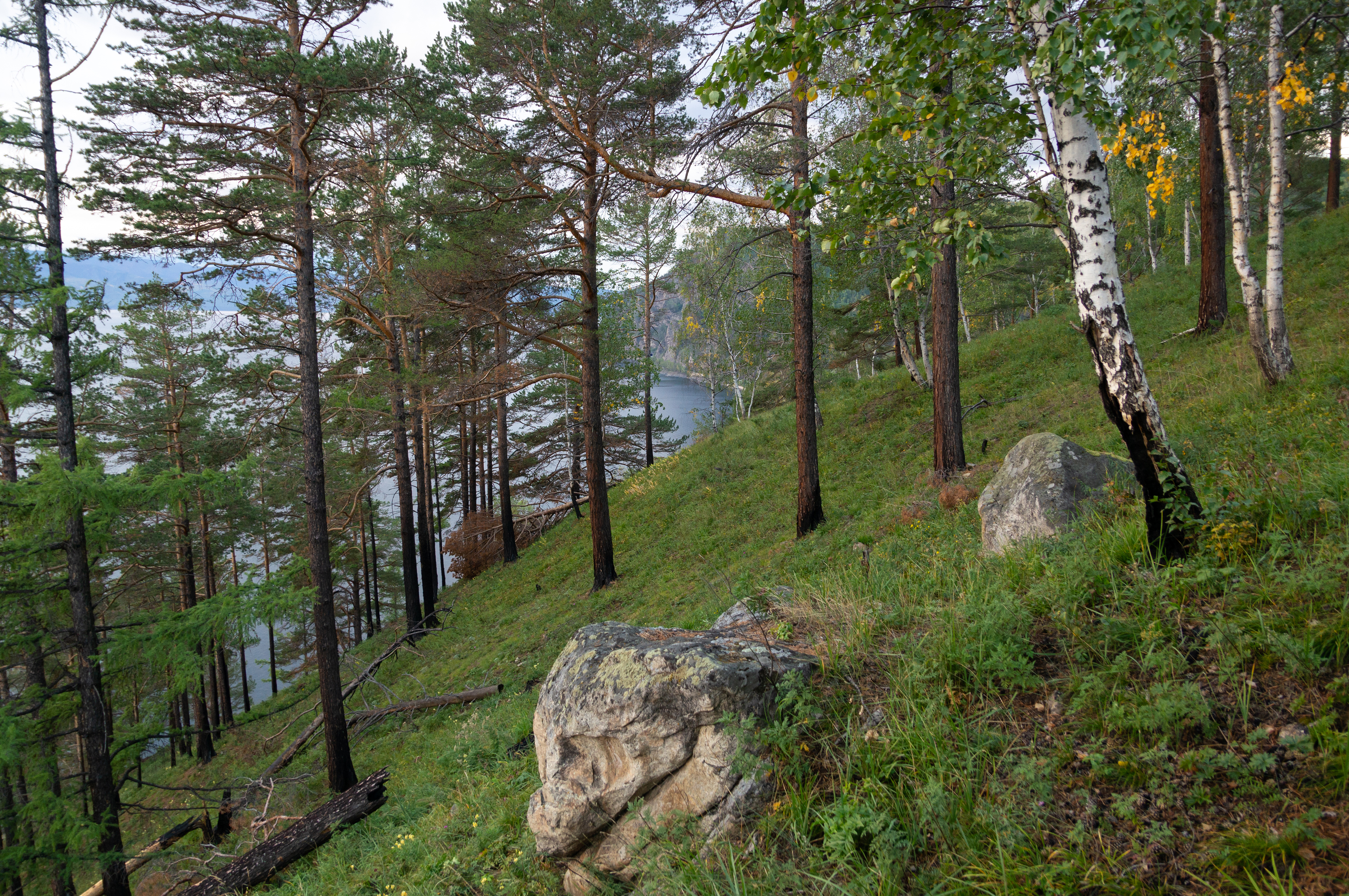
Pines and birches in the Siberian taiga by Lake Baikal

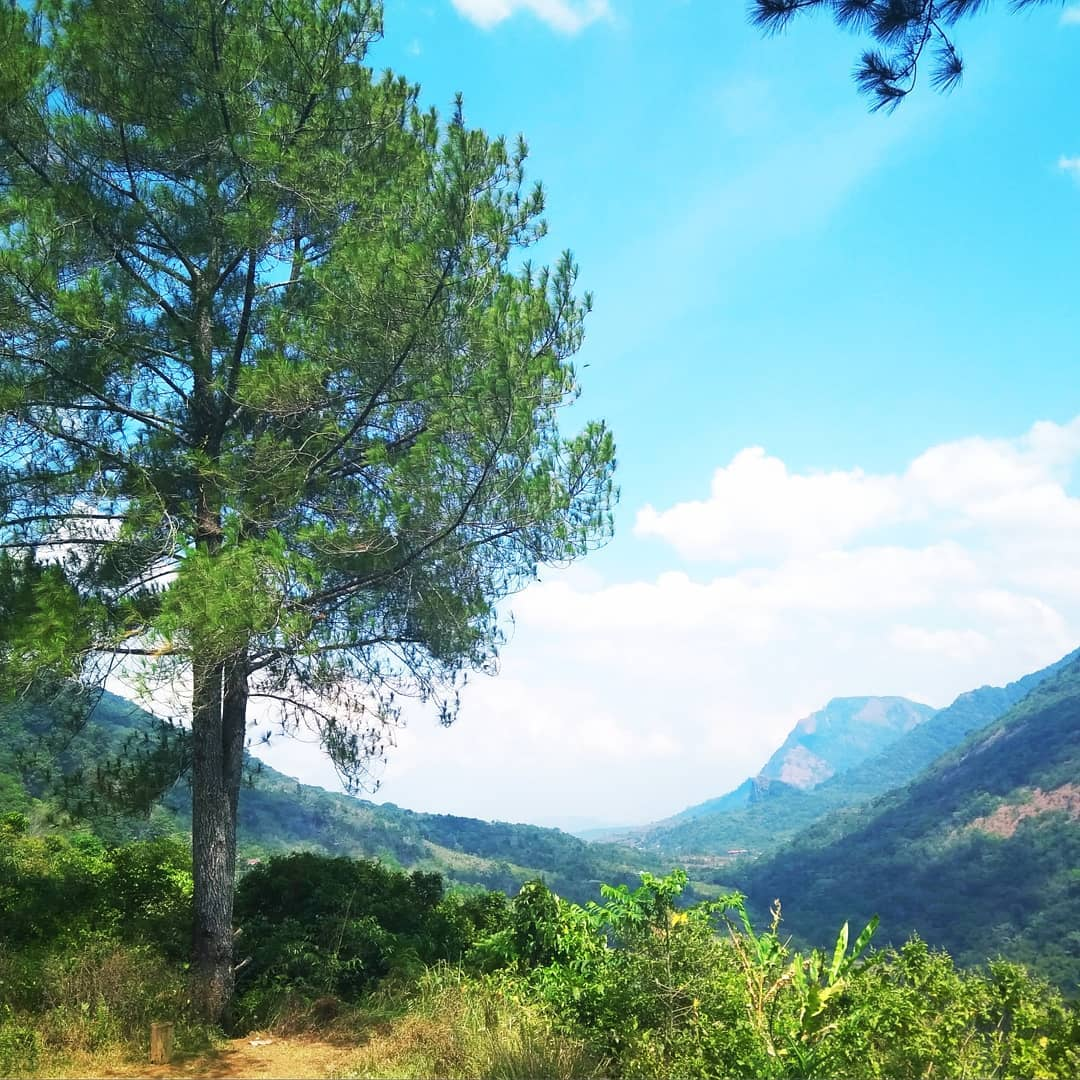
Pinus merkusii in Sumatra: the only pine whose range extends south of the equator

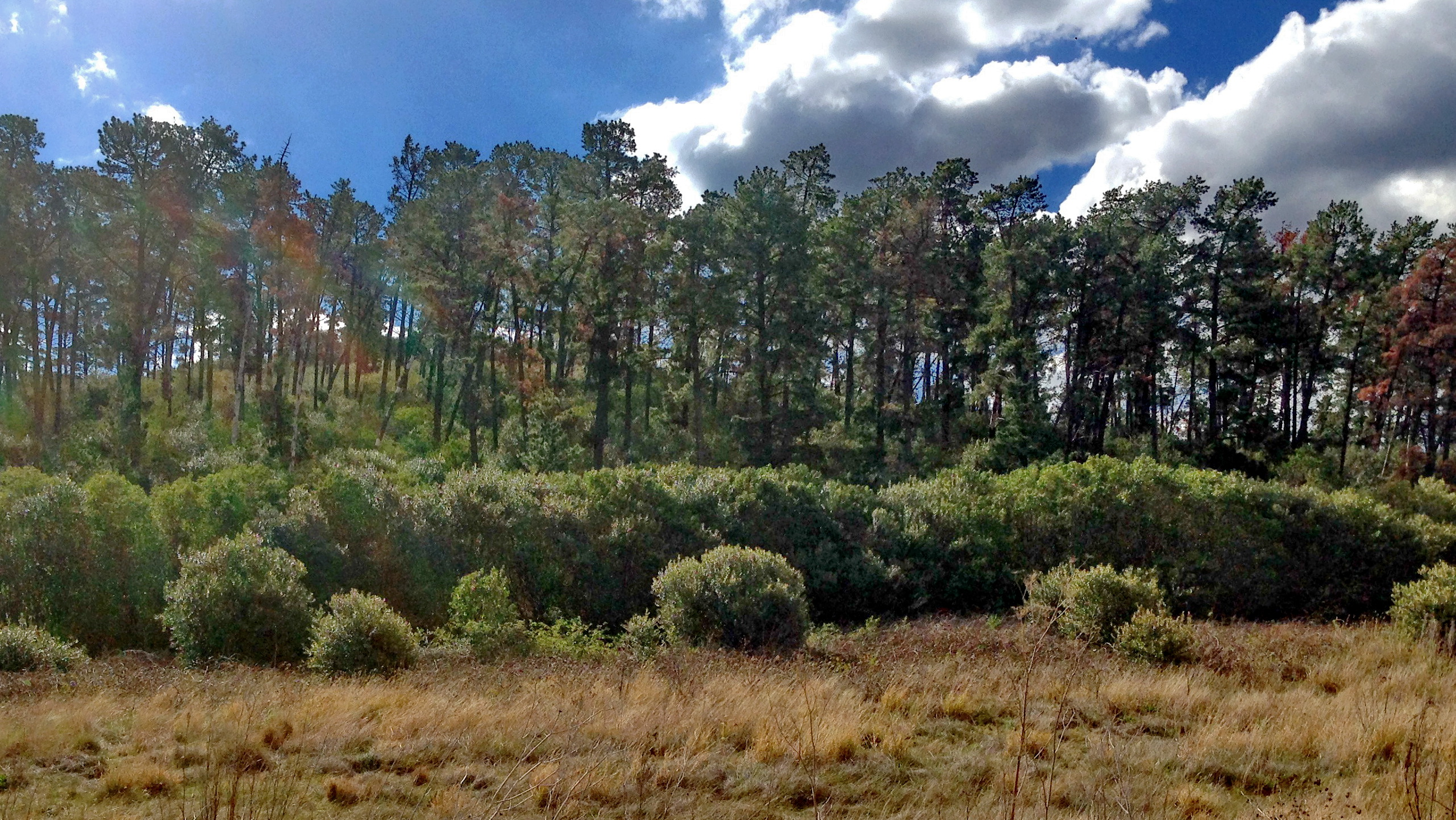
Pinus radiata in Australia, where it was introduced in the late 19th century.

== Ecology ==
=== Environmental factors ===
Pines grow in a very large variety of environments, ranging from semi-arid desert to rainforests, from sea level up to 5,200 m (17,100 ft), from the coldest to the hottest environments on Earth. They often occur in mountainous areas with favourable soils.

Pinus contorta is a fire-dependent species, requiring wildfires to maintain healthy populations of diverse ages. Pinus canariensis is highly fire-resistant, with adaptations such as growing epicormic sprouts after losing its needles in a fire. Some species such as Pinus muricata need fire to open their cones, allowing them to disperse their seeds. Other pines such as Pinus mugo and Pinus yunnanensis can grow at high elevation. Some pines, such as Pinus sabiniana, are adapted to growth in hot, dry semidesert climates.

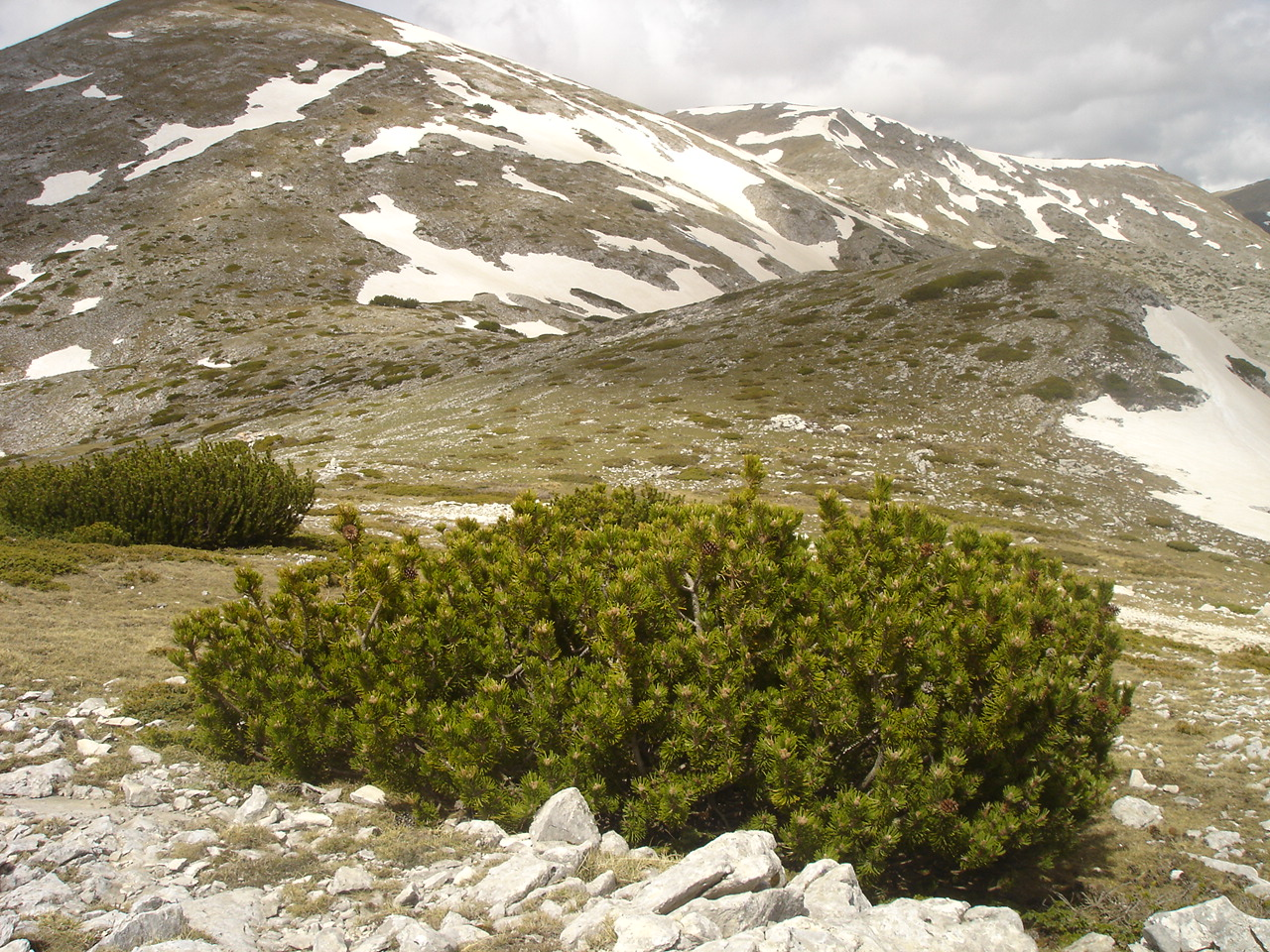
Pinus mugo, a dwarf mountain species at altitude in North Macedonia

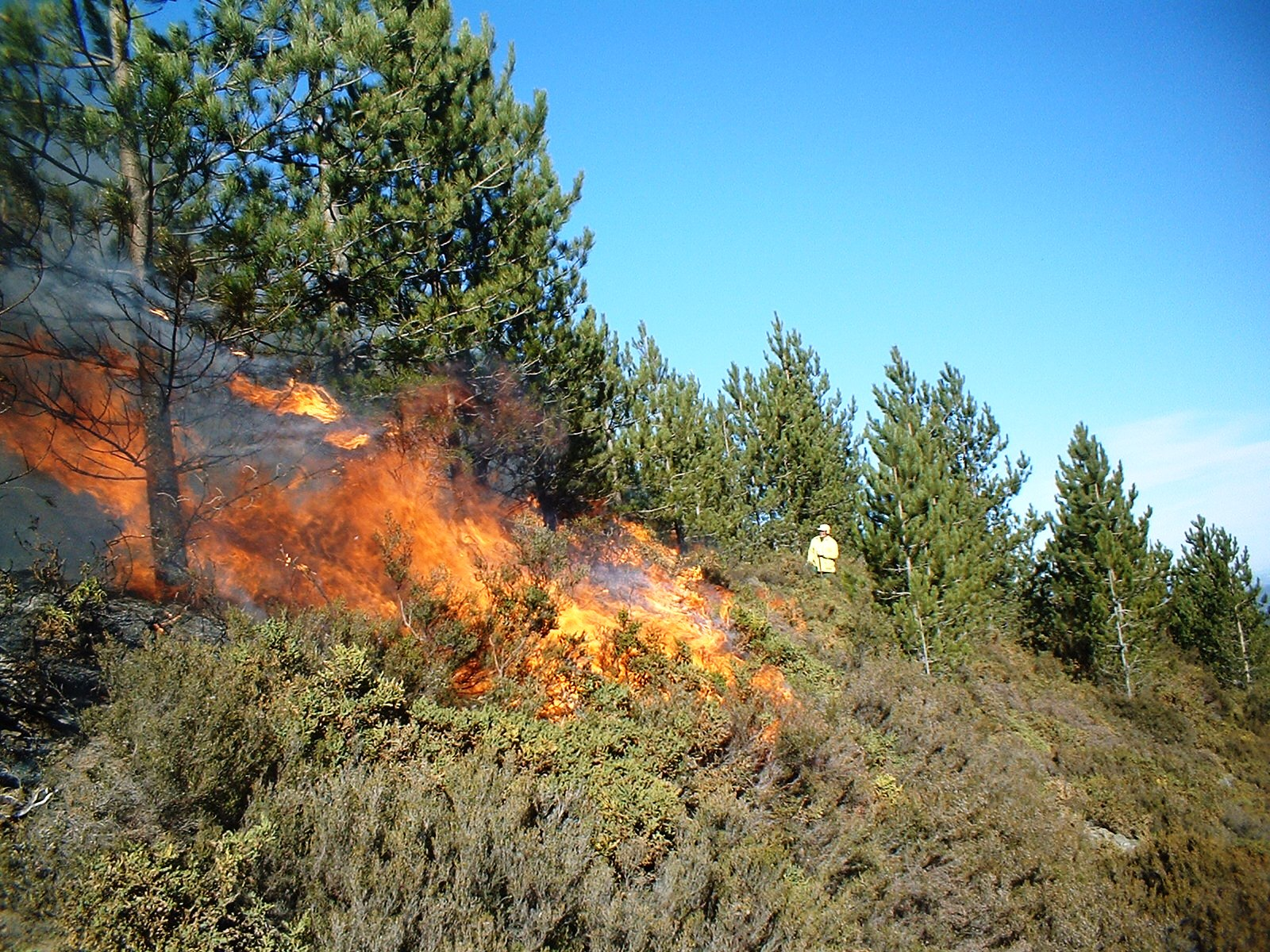
A controlled burn in a Pinus nigra stand, Portugal

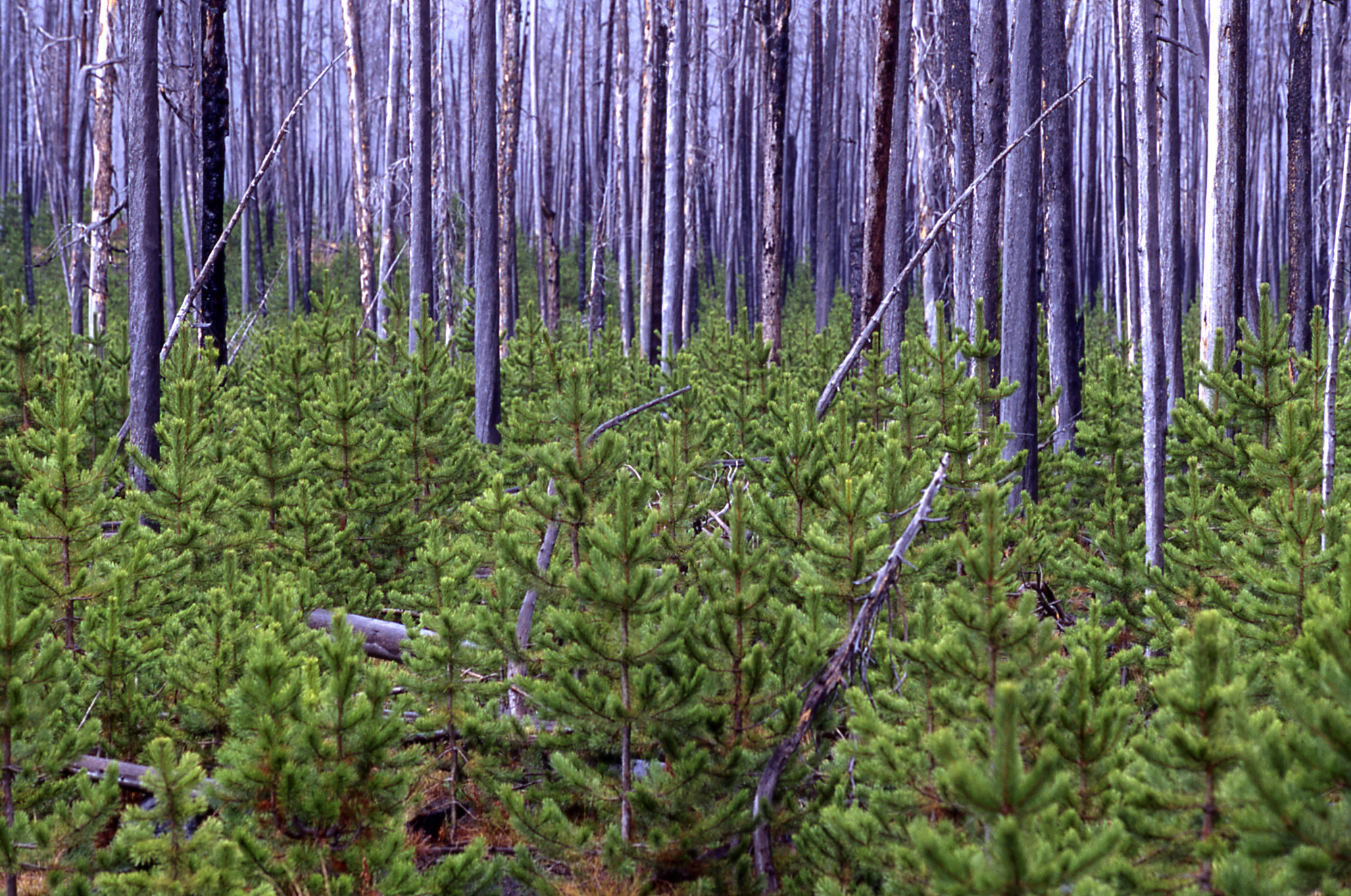
A stand of Pinus contorta regenerating 10 years after a major fire at Yellowstone National Park

=== Species interactions ===
Pine needles serve as food for the caterpillar larvae of several moth species including the pine beauty, a pest of mature stands of pine trees, and the pine hawk-moth, a large species which causes only occasional damage. Some moths, notably the pine processionary, whose caterpillars can completely defoliate pine trees, and the pine-tree lappet, are serious pests of commercial forestry.

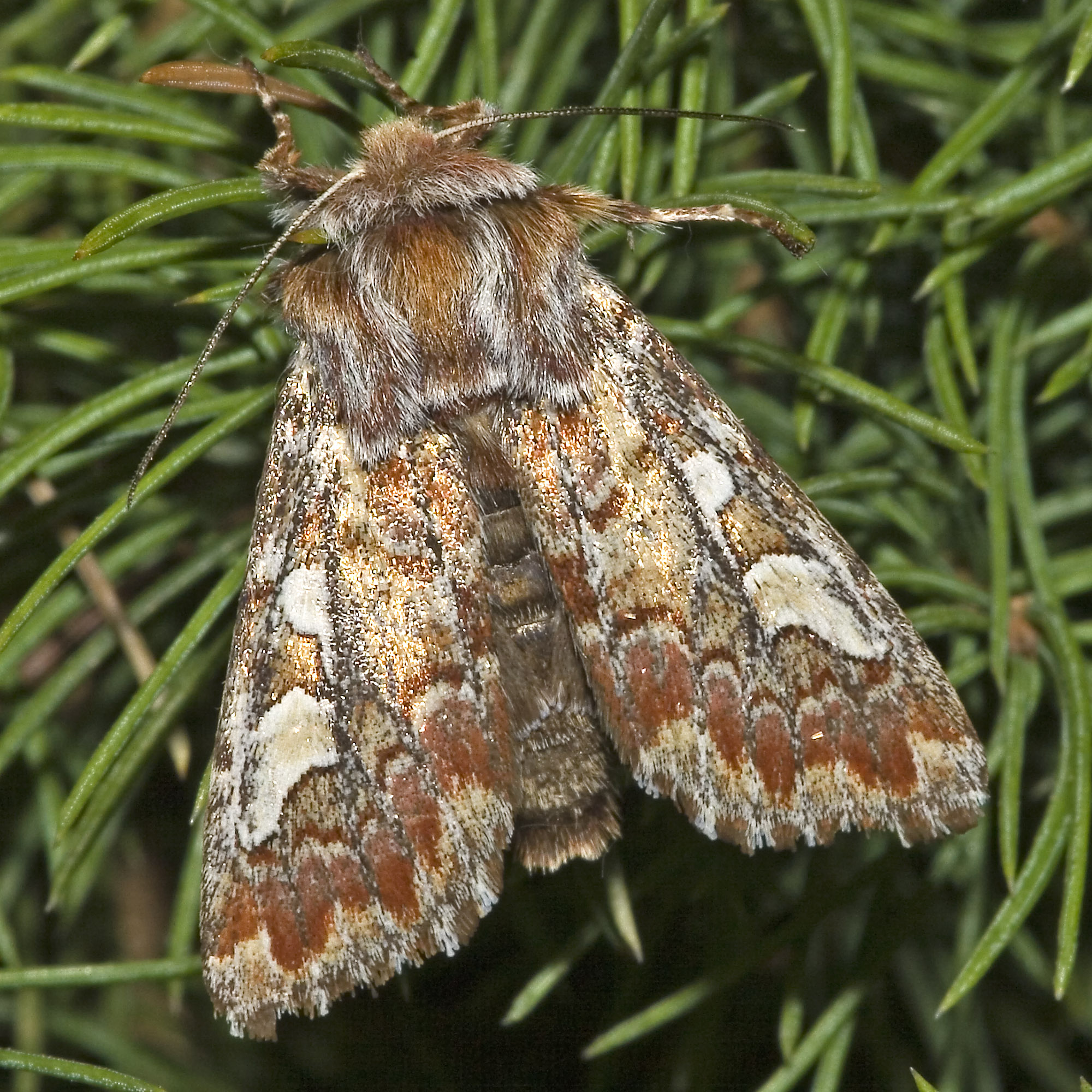
Pine beauty moth (Panolis flammea)

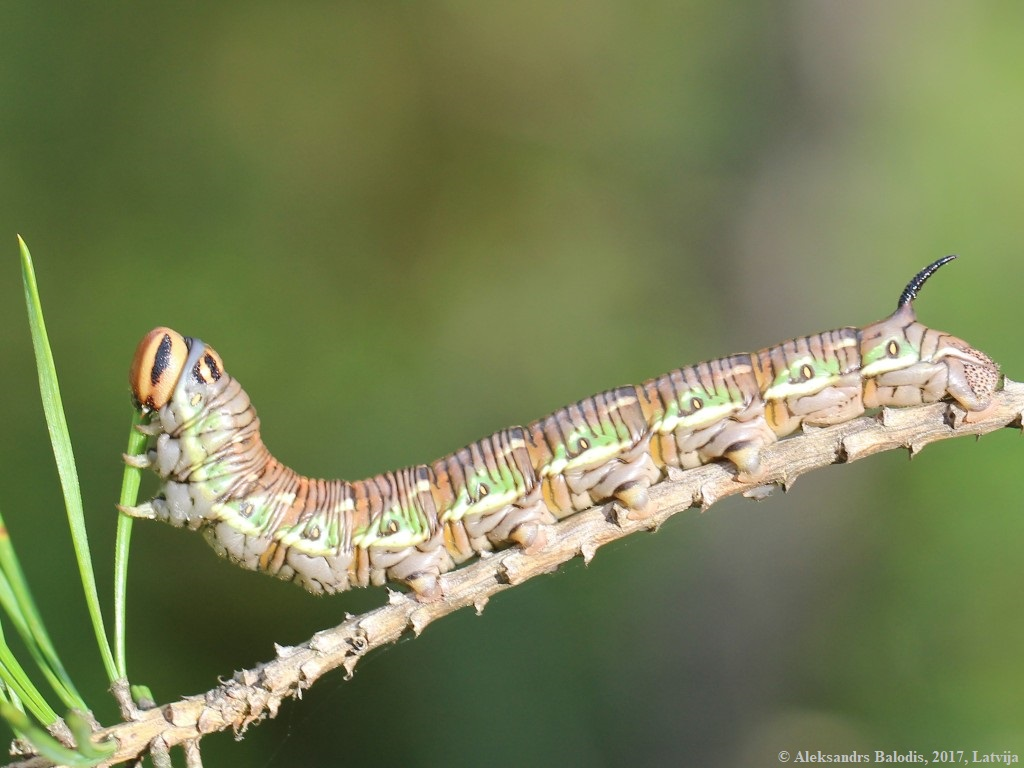
Pine hawk-moth (Sphinx pinastri) caterpillar feeding on pine needles

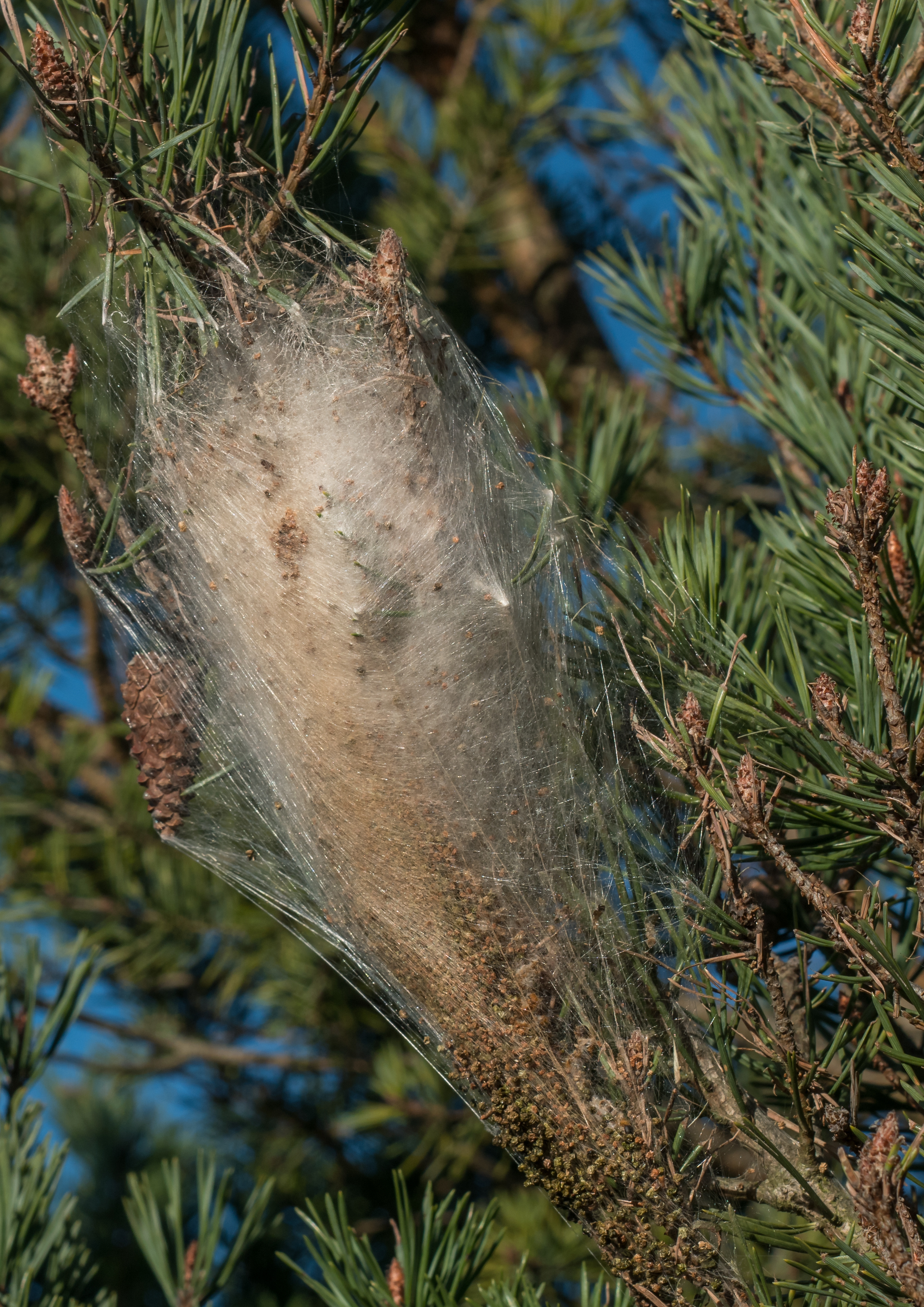
Tent of pine processionary moth (Thaumetopoea pityocampa) caterpillars

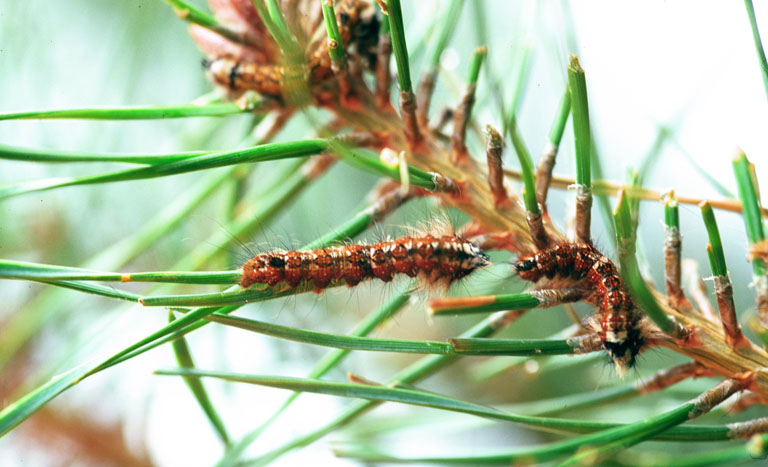
Pine-tree lappet (Dendrolimus pini) caterpillars on Scots pine with damage to needles

Several species of pine are attacked by nematodes, causing pine wilt disease, which can quickly kill trees. The sawfly Diprion pini is likewise a serious commercial pest of pine forestry, especially of Pinus sylvestris. Some birds such as nutcrackers are specialist feeders on pine seeds, and are important in distributing the seeds widely. Crossbills rely on Pinus sylvestris seeds in Scotland, and similarly help significantly to disperse the seeds, whereas red squirrels feed on the seeds but do little for seed dispersal. Pine pollen may contribute to food webs involving detritivores. Nutrients from pollen aid detritivores in development, growth, and maturation, and may enable fungi to decompose plant litter which is low in nutrients. The edible basidiomycete fungus Boletus pinophilus (pine bolete) forms an ectomycorrhizal association with pines such as P. cembra, P. nigra, and P. sylvestris.

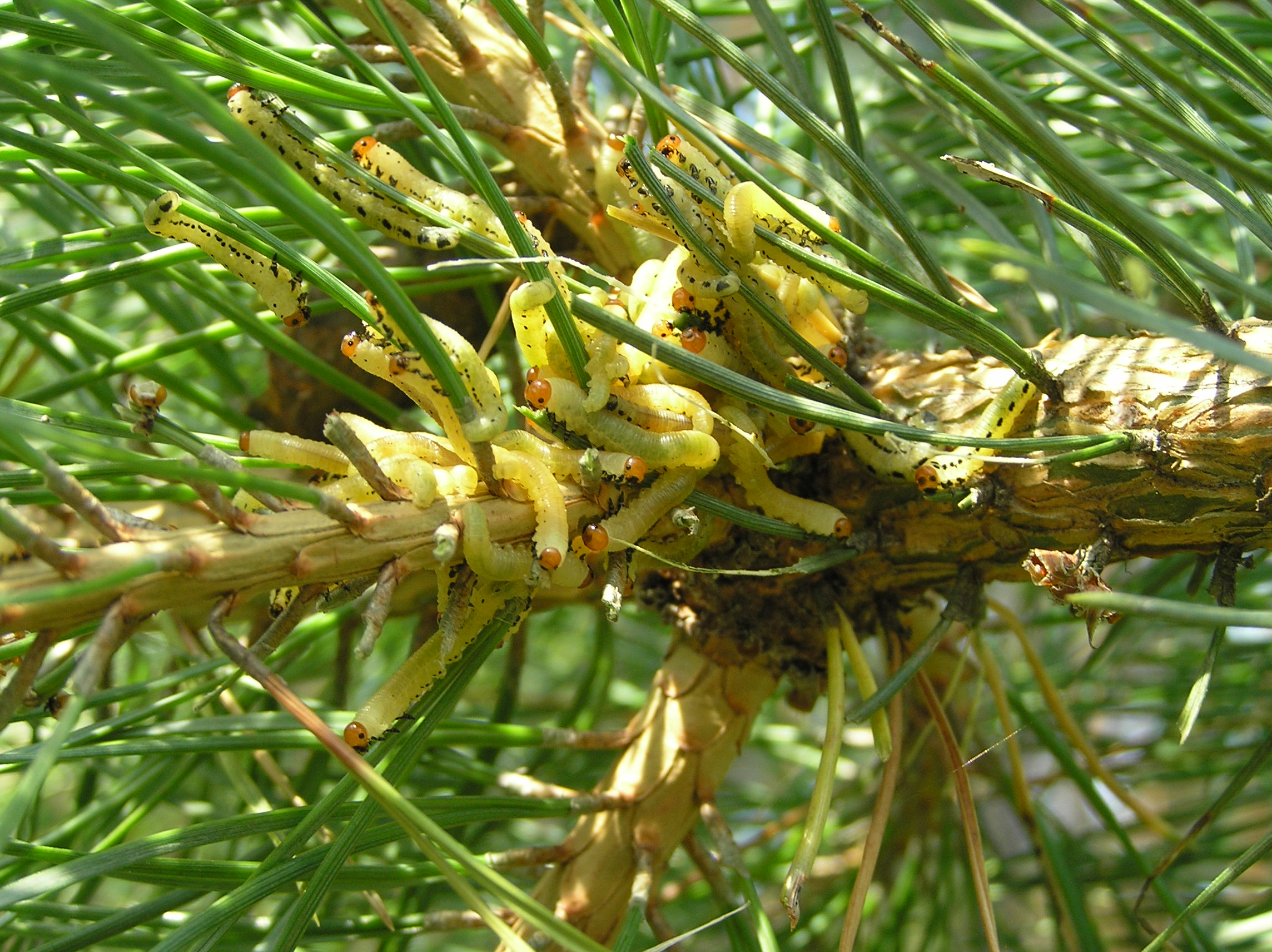
Mass of Diprion pini sawfly caterpillars on pine tree

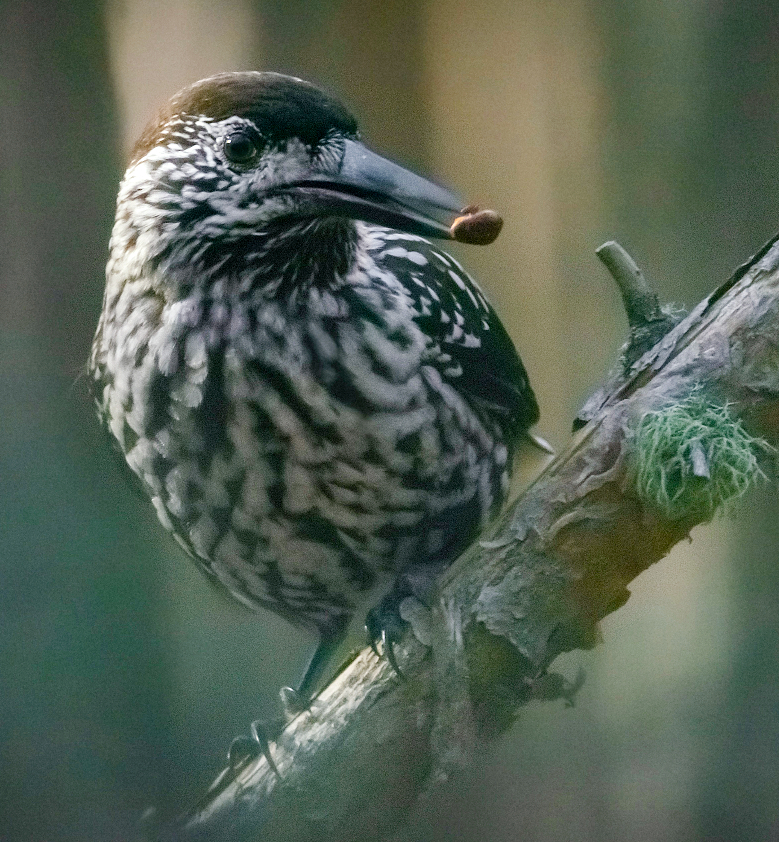
Northern nutcracker with nut of Pinus sibirica

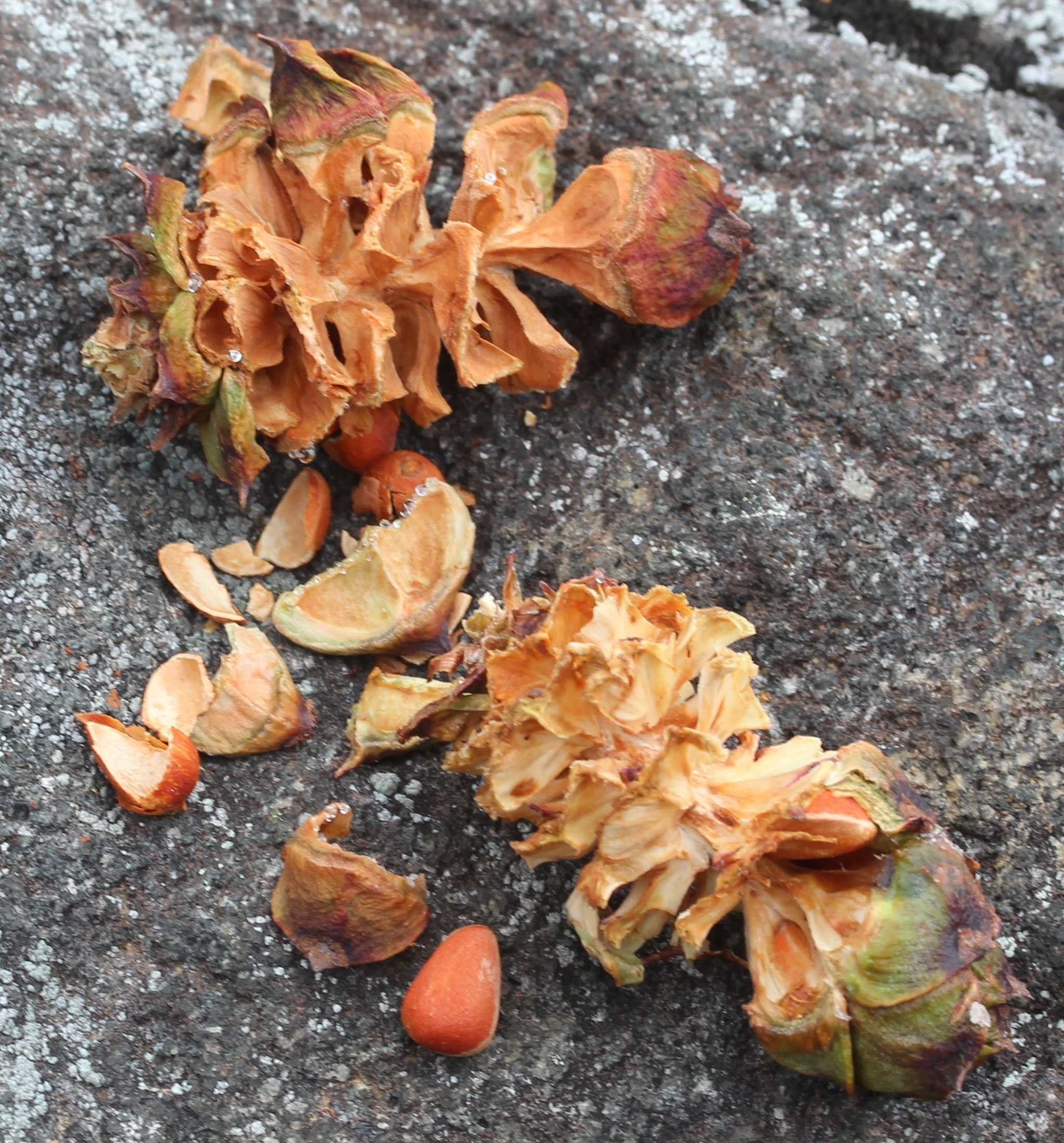
Pinus pumila cone opened by nutcrackers

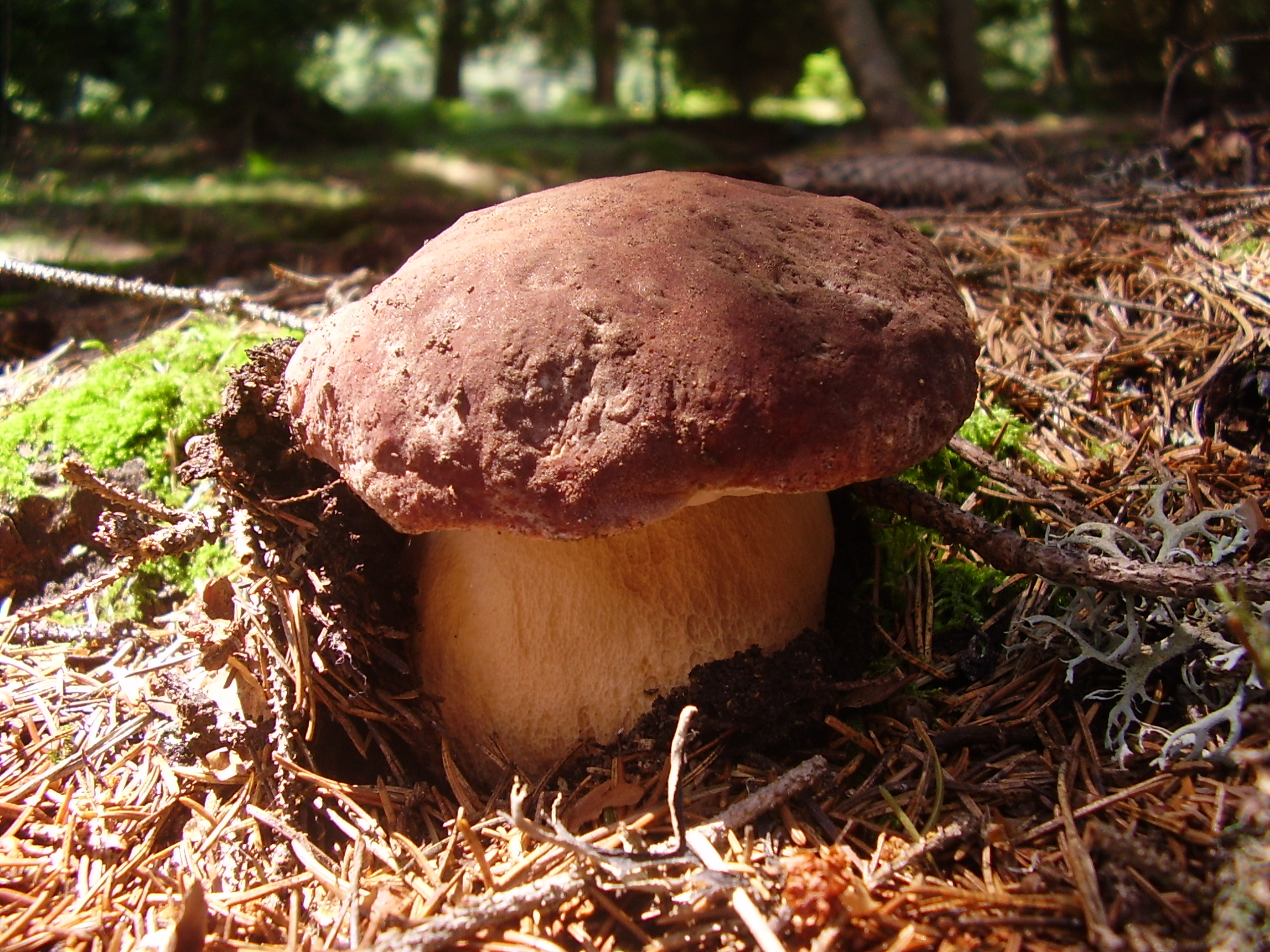
The pine bolete Boletus pinophilus forms an ectomycorrhizal association with several pines.

== Uses ==
=== Timber ===
Pines are among the most commercially important tree species, valued for their timber and wood pulp throughout the world. In temperate and tropical regions, they are fast-growing softwoods that grow in relatively dense stands. Commercial pines are grown in plantations for timber that is denser and therefore more durable than spruce (Picea). Pine wood is widely used in high-value carpentry items such as furniture, window frames, panelling, floors, and roofing due to its abundance and low cost.

As pine wood has little resistance to insects or decay after logging, in its untreated state it is generally recommended for indoor construction purposes only, such as indoor drywall framing. It is commonly used in Canadian Lumber Standard graded wood. For outside use, pine needs to be treated with copper azole, chromated copper arsenate or other suitable chemical preservatives.

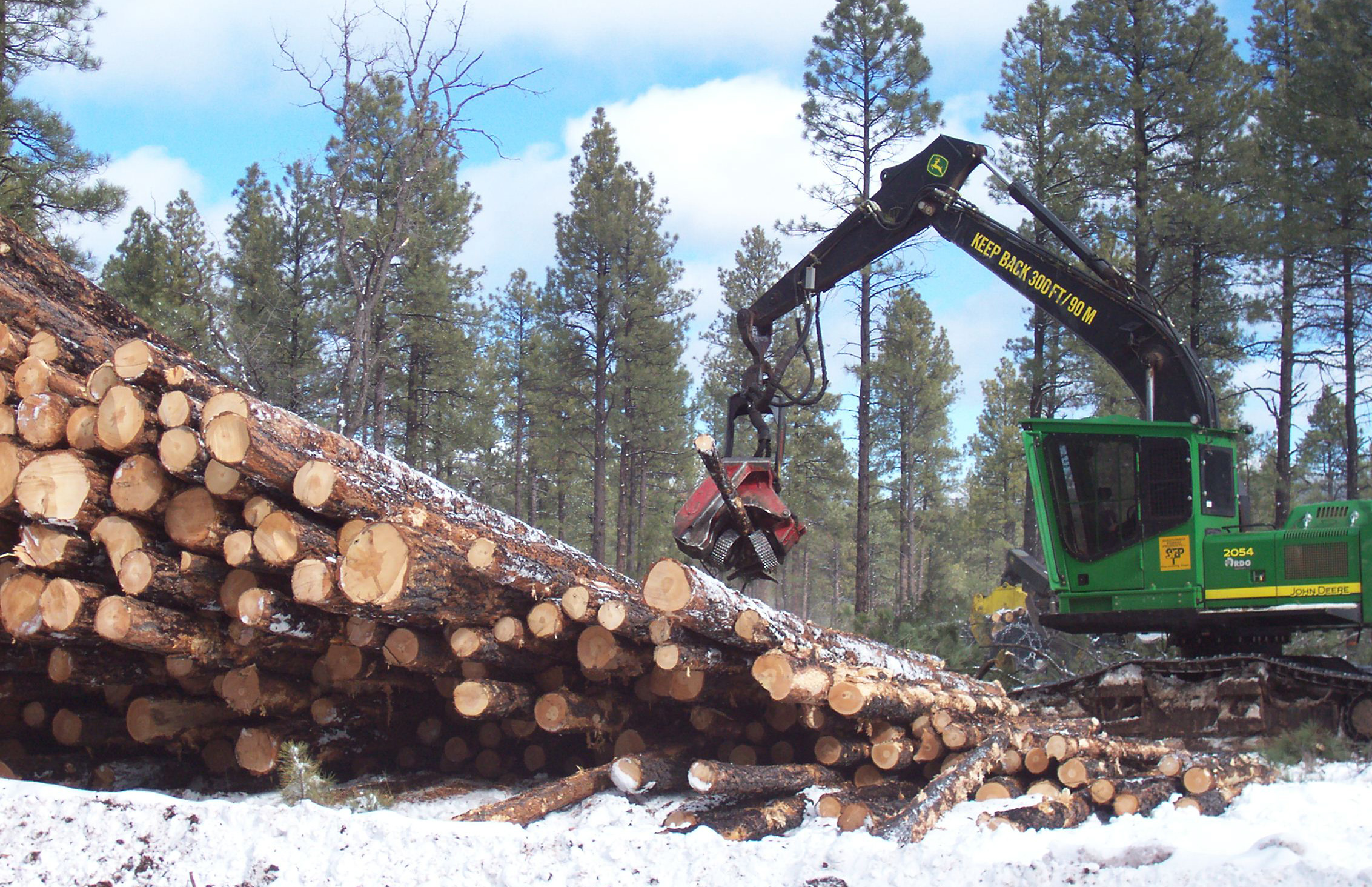
Logging Pinus ponderosa, Arizona

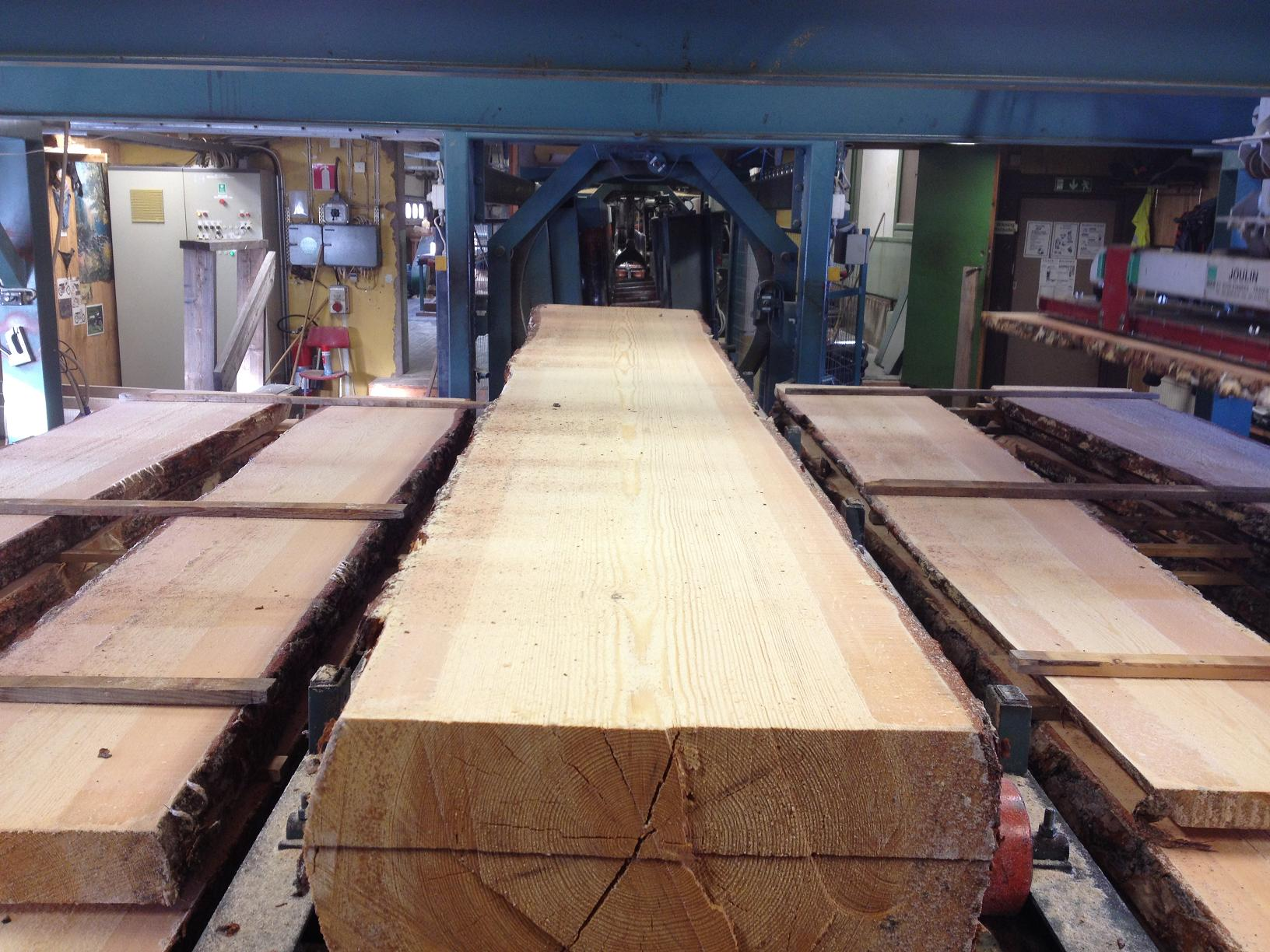
100 mm (4 inch) thick pine timber sawn in sawmill, Sweden

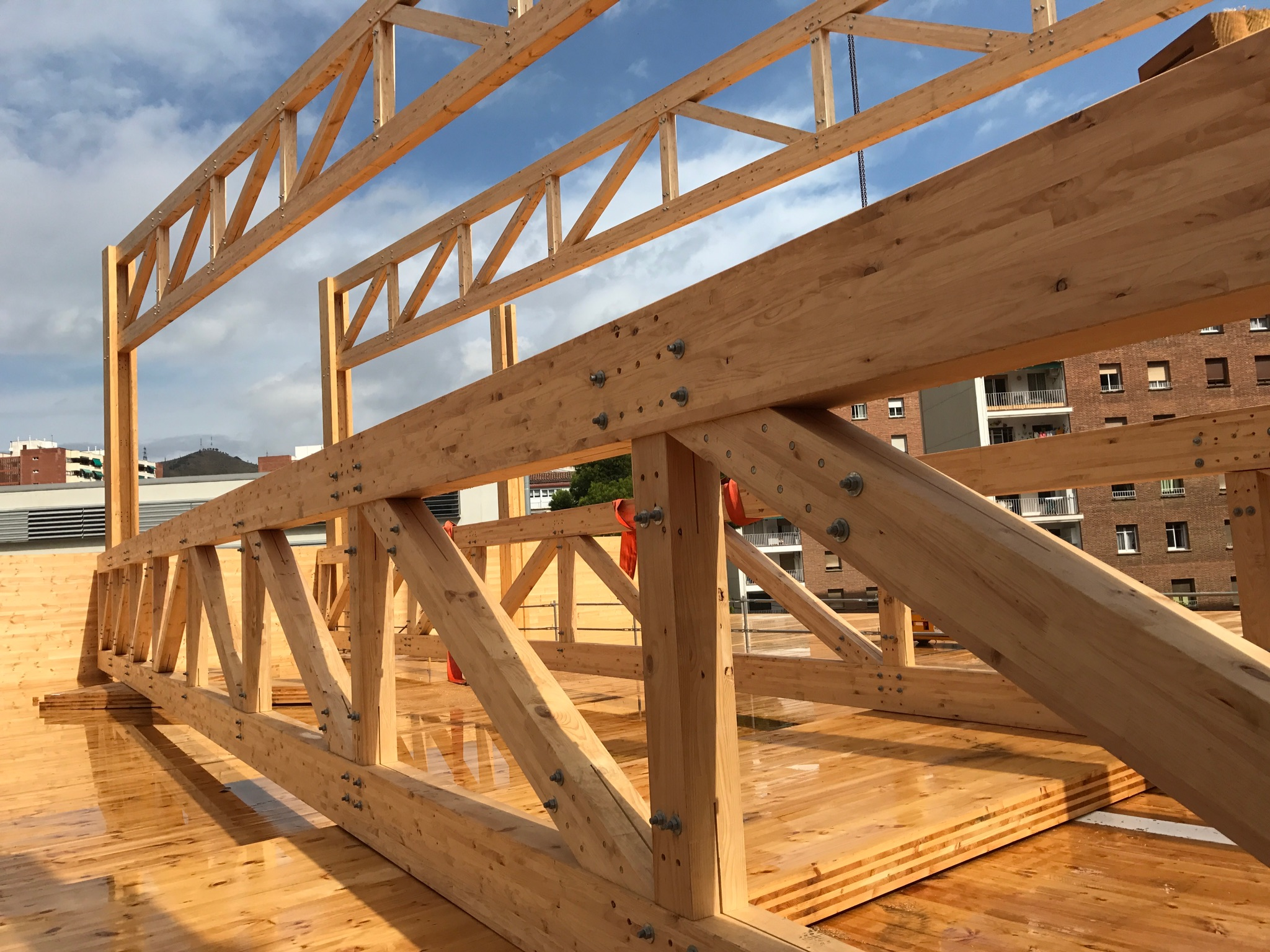
Pine as an architectural material, Spain

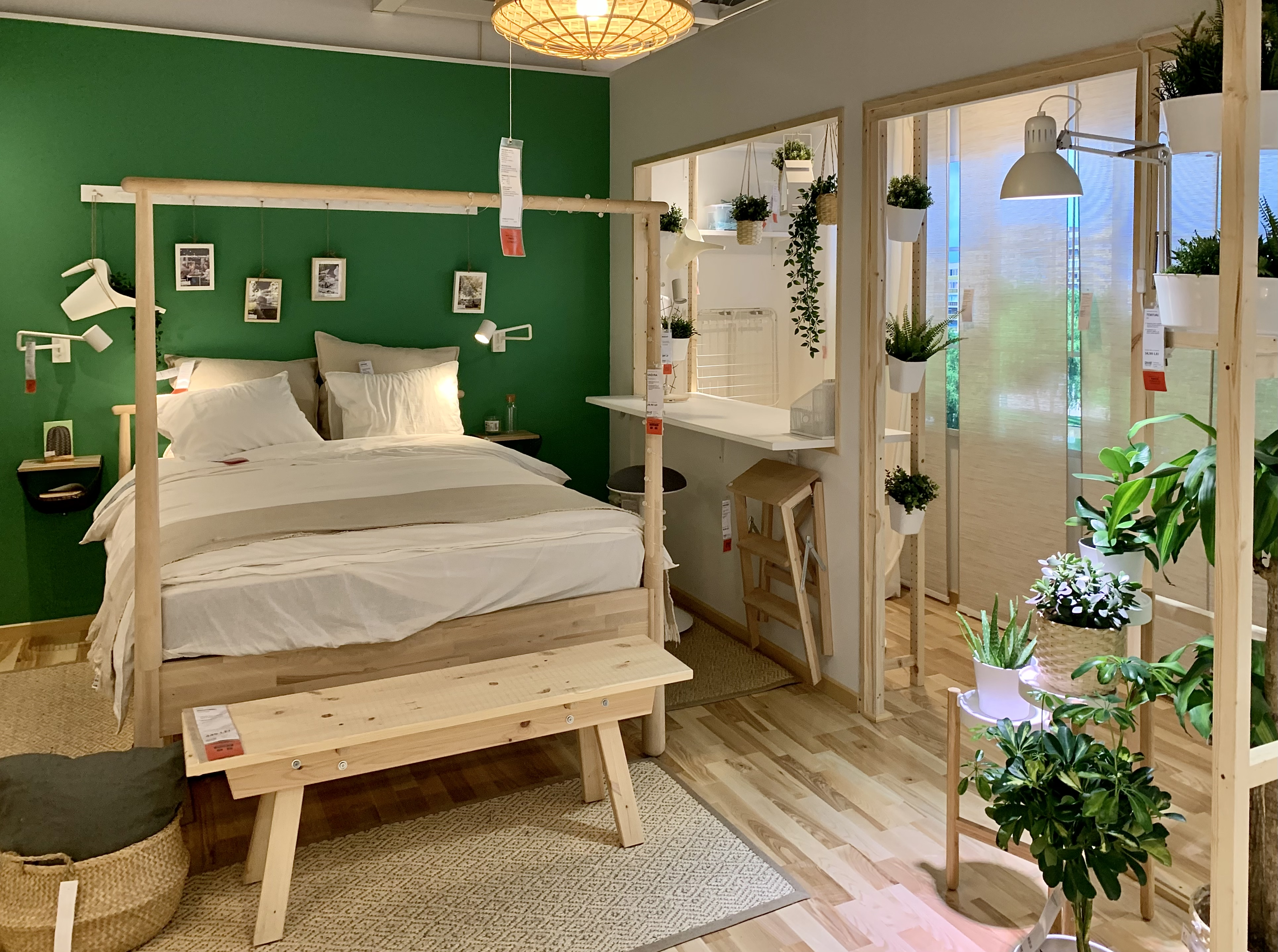
Pine furniture, 2019

=== Ornamental uses ===
Many pine trees make attractive ornamental plantings for parks and larger gardens, while dwarf cultivars are suitable for smaller spaces. There are at least 818 named cultivars (or trinomials) recognised by the American Conifer Society ACS.

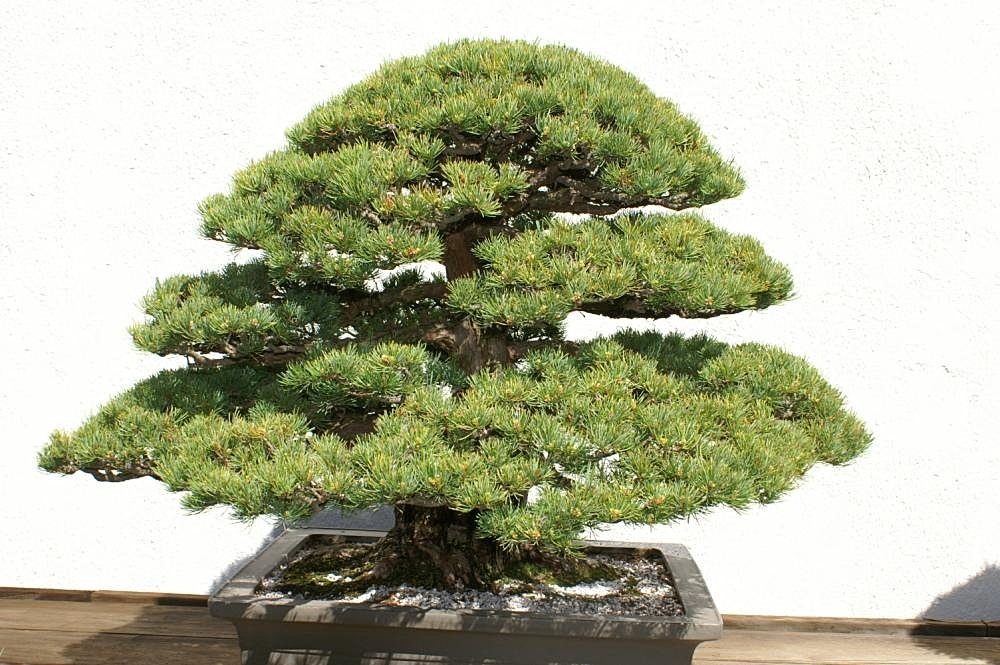
Pinus parviflora 'Miyajima' ornamental cultivar

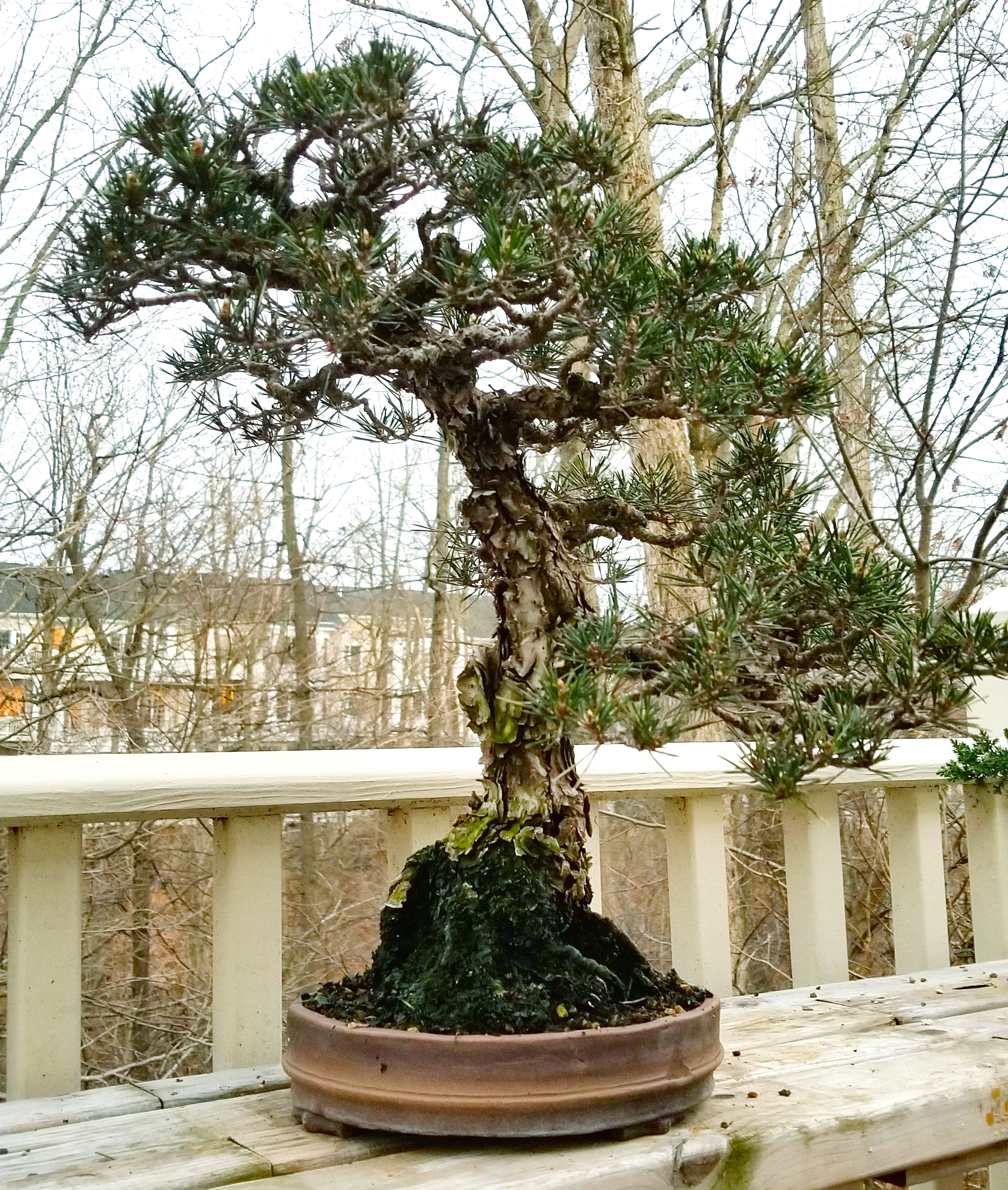
Pinus thunbergii 'Kotobuki'
as a 65-year-old bonsai

=== Food ===
The seeds (pine nuts) are generally edible; the young male cones can be cooked and eaten, as can the bark of young twigs. Some species have large pine nuts, which are harvested and sold for cooking and baking. They are an ingredient of pesto alla genovese.

The soft, moist, white inner bark (cambium) beneath the woody outer bark is edible and very high in vitamins A and C. It can be eaten raw in slices as a snack or dried and ground up into a powder for use as an ersatz flour or thickener in stews, soups, and other foods, such as bark bread. The use of pine cambium gave the Adirondack Indians their name, from the Mohawk Indian word atirú:taks, meaning "tree eaters".

A herbal tea is made by steeping young, green pine needles in boiling water (known as tallstrunt in Sweden). In eastern Asia, pine and other conifers are accepted among consumers as a beverage product, and used in teas, as well as wine. In Greece, the wine retsina is flavoured with resin from Pinus halepensis (Aleppo pine).

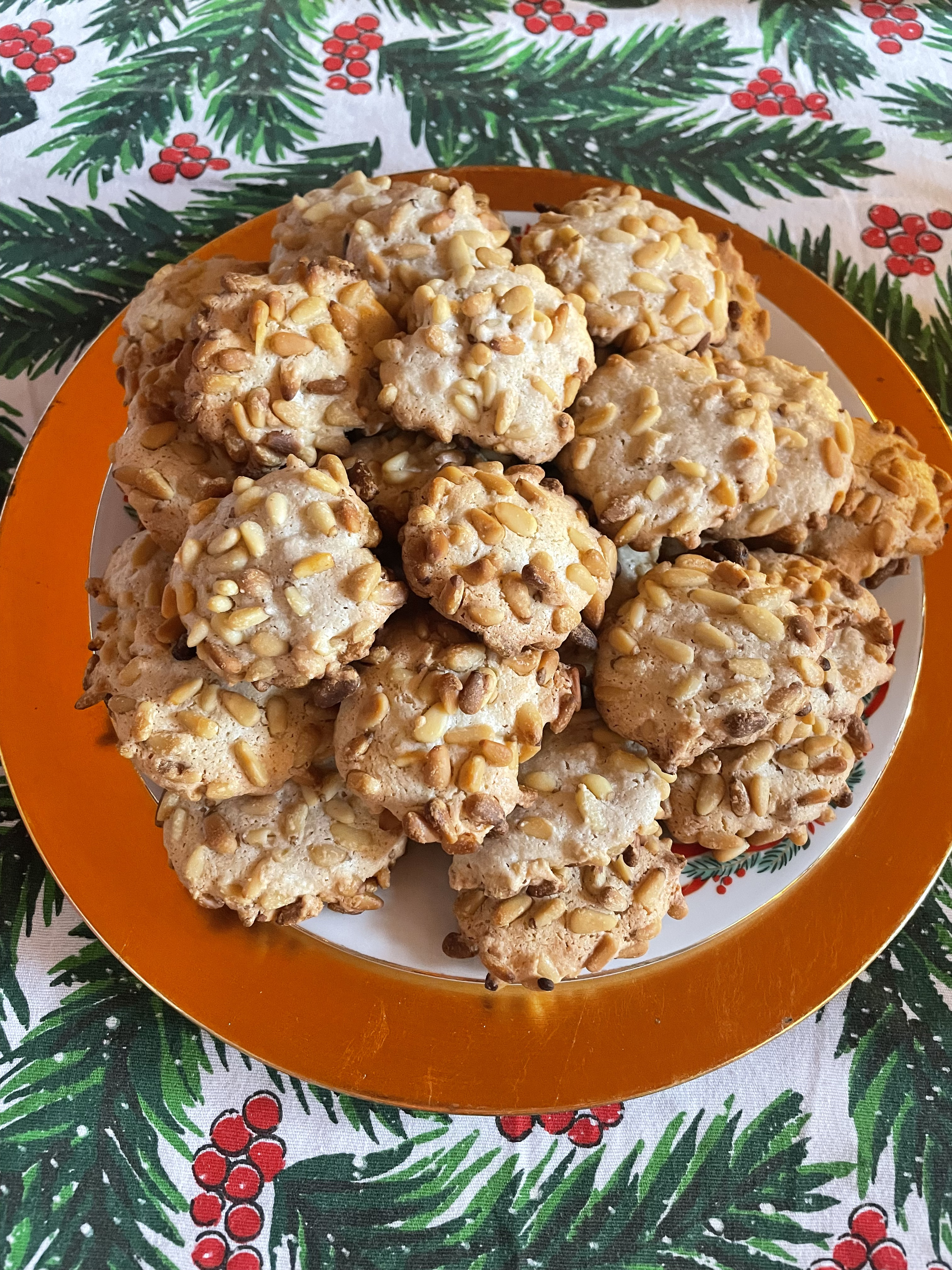
Pinolate biscuits with pine nuts

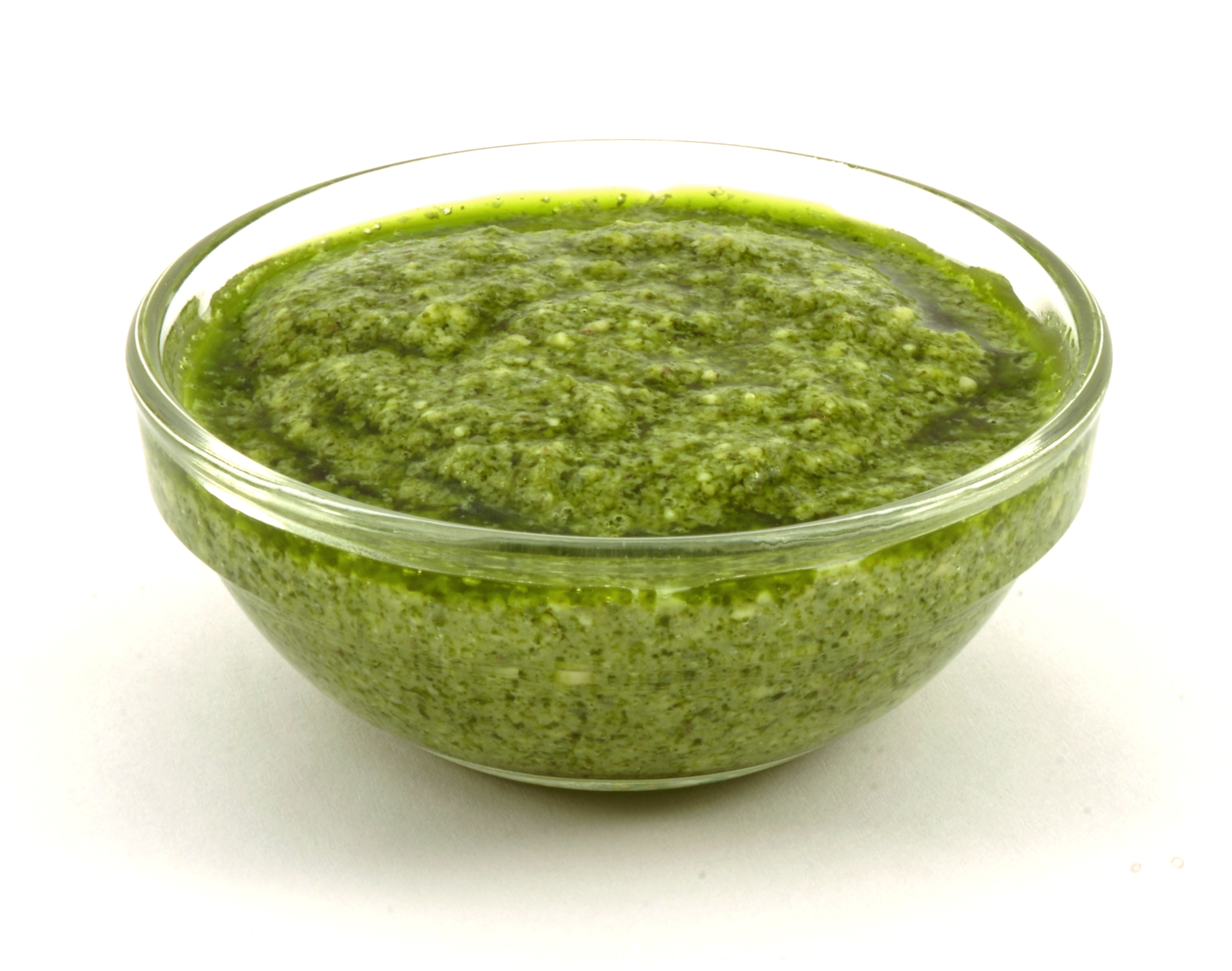
Pesto with basil and pine nuts

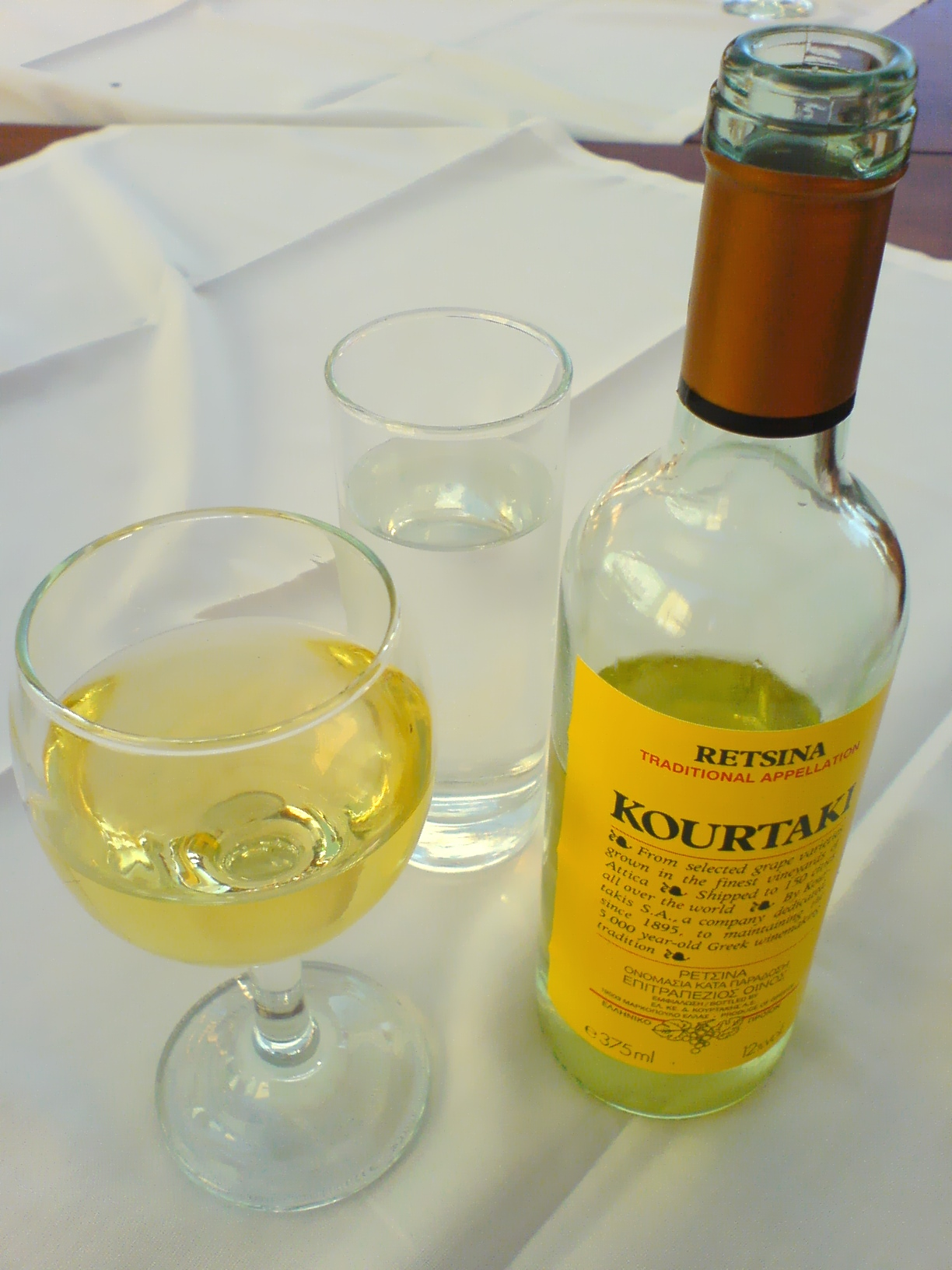
A bottle of retsina,
a Greek wine flavoured with Pinus halepensis resin

=== Other uses ===
Turpentine oil, traditionally used as a solvent in paints, resins and varnishes, is extracted from pine resin or pine wood. Pine needles are woven into baskets in Latin America. In traditional Chinese medicine, pine resin is used for burns, wounds and skin complaints. Chinese ink sticks for calligraphy are often made of pine soot, producing a matt black ink when mixed with water. Pine needles have been used by Latvian designer Tamara Orjola to create biodegradable products including paper, furniture, textiles and dyestuffs.

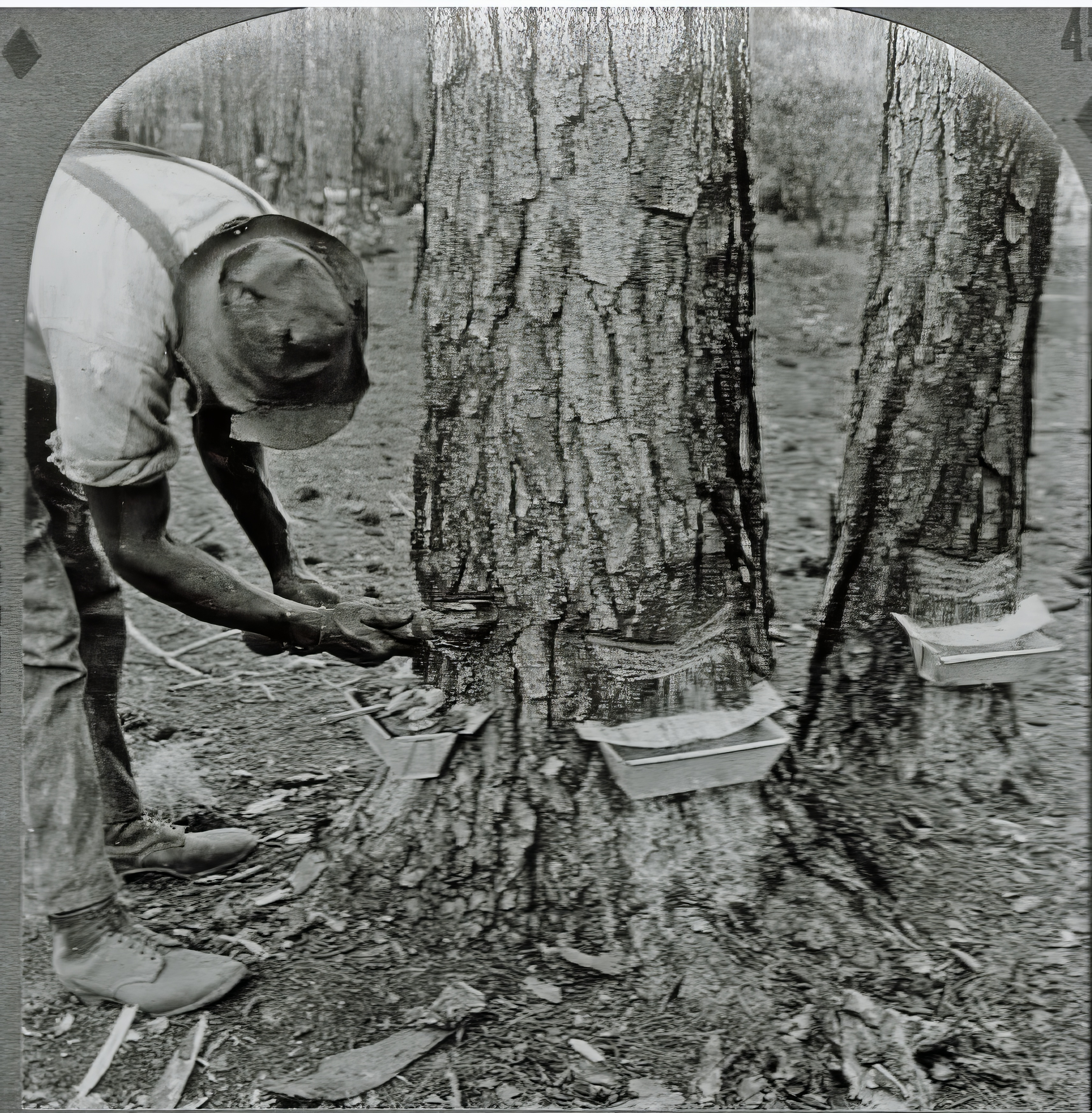
Extracting resin to make turpentine and rosin (before 1920)

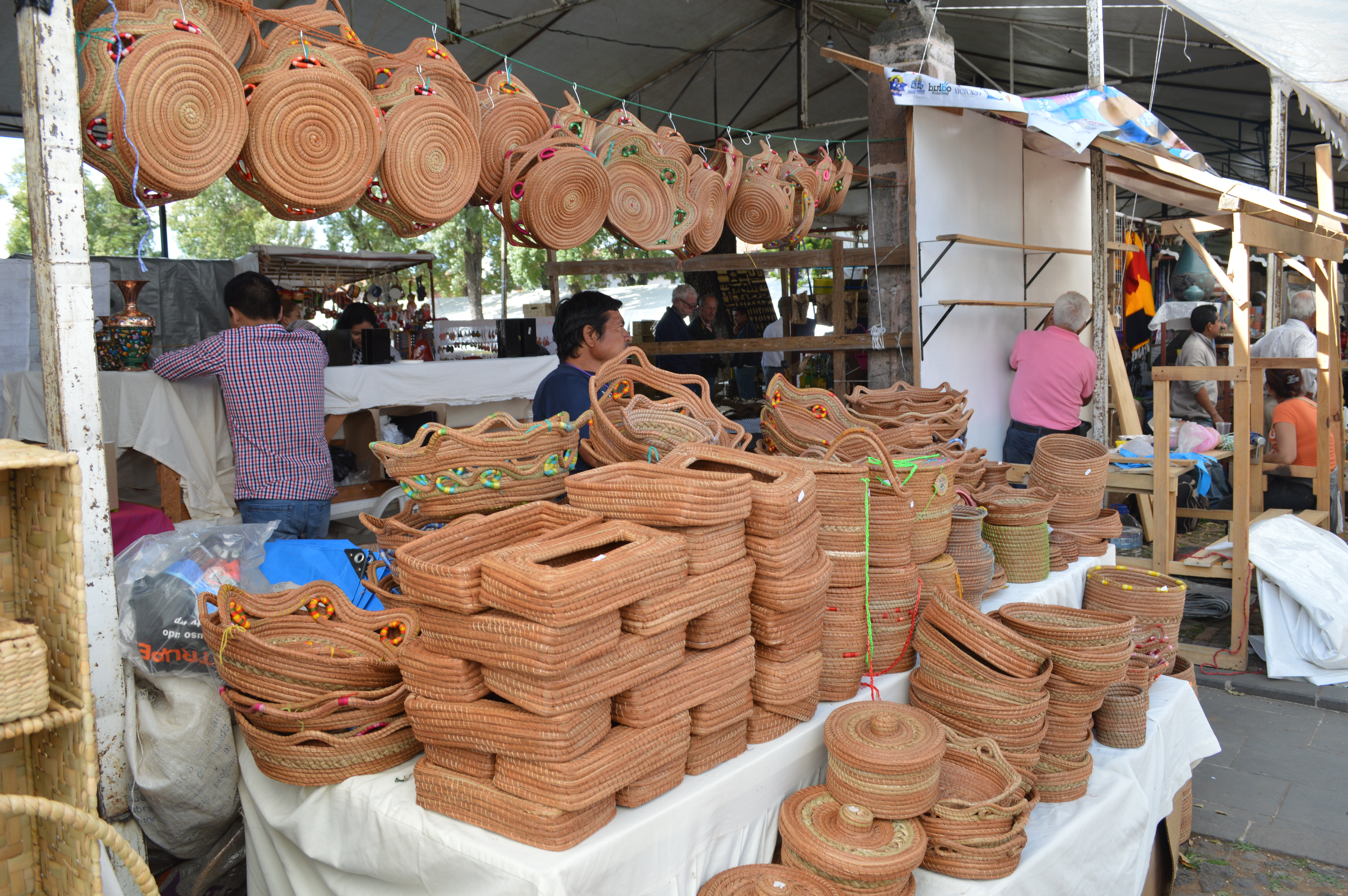
Pine needle baskets, Pátzcuaro, Mexico, 2016

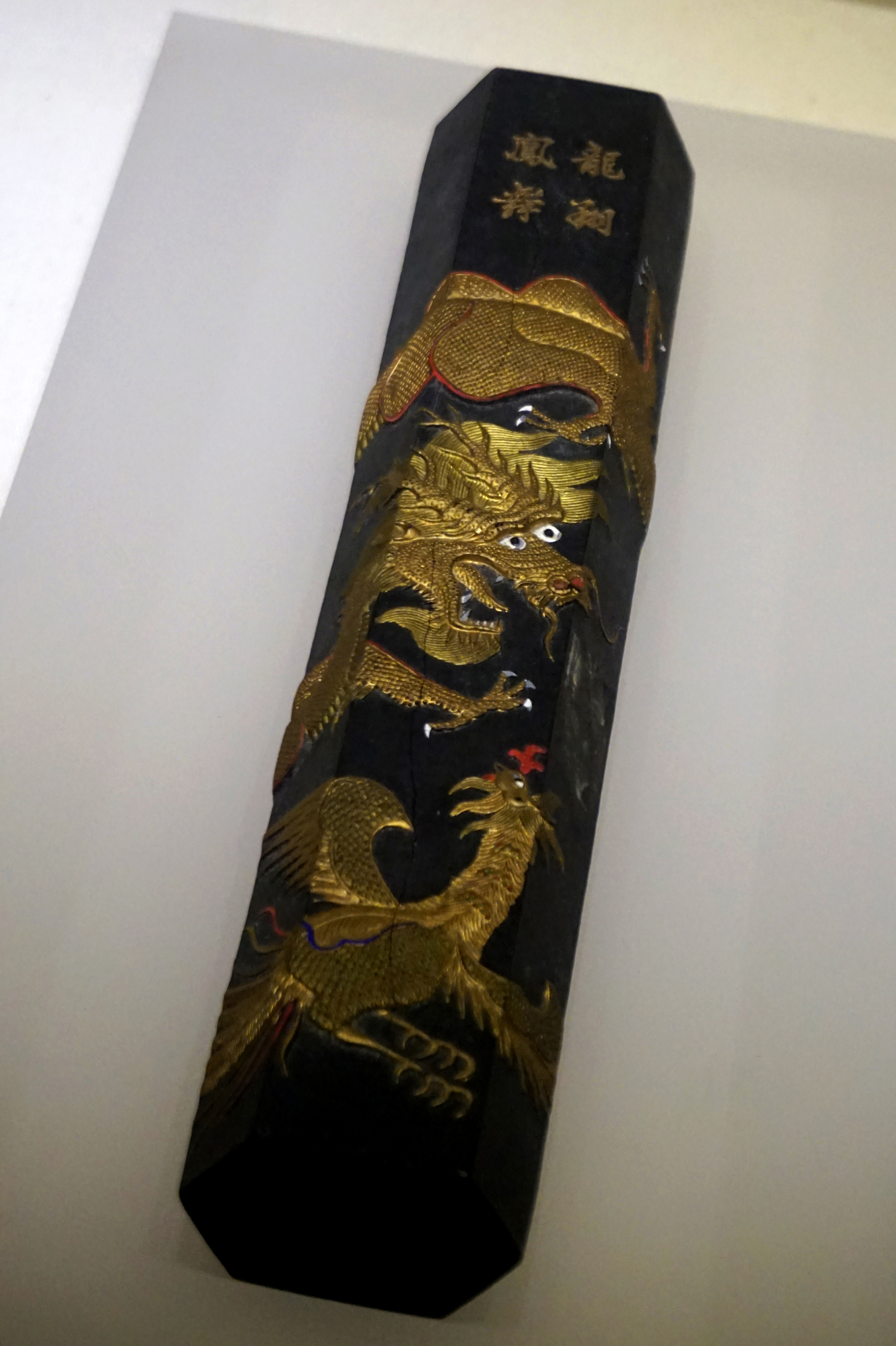
Chinese ink sticks can be made of pine soot

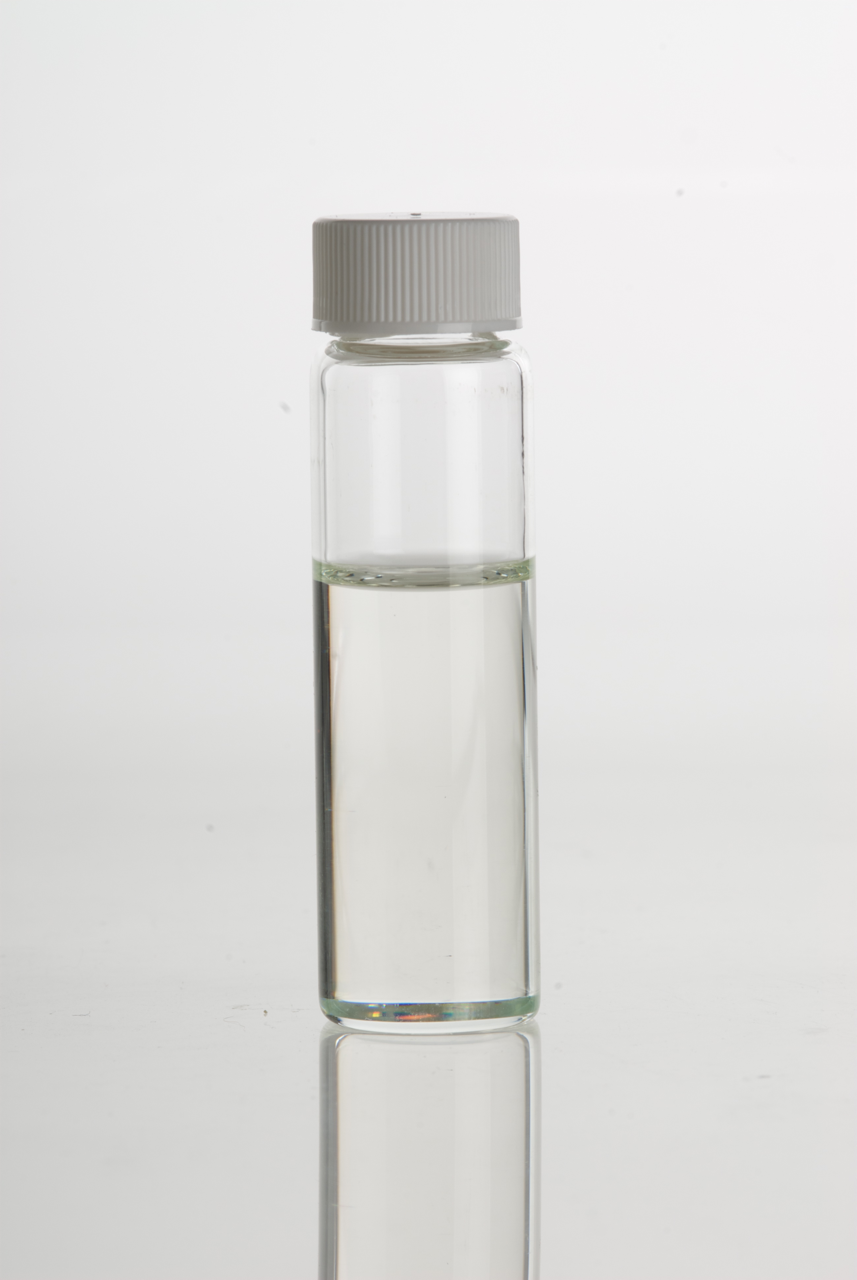
Essential oil from Pinus sylvestris

== Culture ==
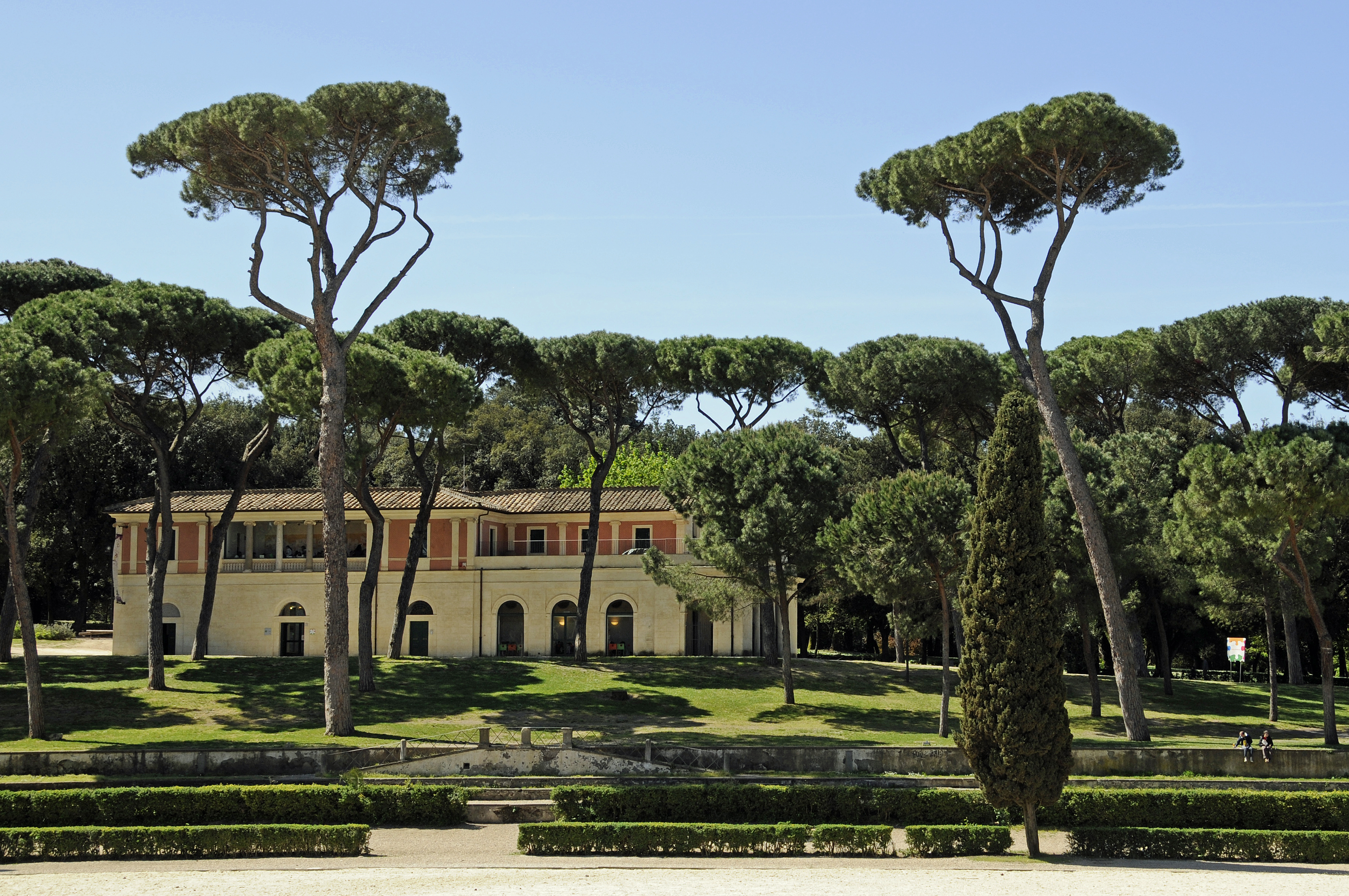
A movement of Respighi's tone poem Pines of Rome depicts the stone pines of the Villa Borghese gardens.

In ancient Egypt, the god Osiris was honoured with an image placed in a cavity inside a pine tree. In ancient Greece, the goddess Pitthea was linked with pines, while in ancient Rome, the tree was worshipped in the festival of the god Attis and the goddess Cybele. The Greek god of wine, Dionysus (also called Bacchus), was associated with pine as a symbol of fertility, and his devotees carried a stick topped with a pine cone (a thyrsus), a phallic symbol. The Buryat people of Siberia revered groves of Pinus sylvestris, while ancient Celtic Druids marked the midwinter solstice with fires of the same species.

The Pines of Rome
Respighi's tone poem played by the United States Army Band

In 1924, the Italian composer Ottorino Respighi completed his tone poem Pines of Rome. Each of its four movements depicts a pine-clad setting in the city of Rome, namely the Villa Borghese gardens, near a catacomb, on the Janiculum Hill, and along the Appian Way.

Pines are often featured in paintings. A 2021 study lists over a hundred works: many are by artists from the Mediterranean region, such as Paul Cézanne and Jean-Baptiste-Camille Corot; Northern Europe, such as Akseli Gallen-Kallela and James William Giles; and North America, with works by Tom Thomson and others. The paintings often depict Pinus pinea by the Mediterranean sea; other species include P. sylvestris and P. pinaster. The pine is a particular motif in Chinese art and literature, which sometimes combines painting and poetry in the same work. The pine symbolises longevity and steadfastness, as it retains its green needles throughout the year. Sometimes the pine and cypress are paired. At other times the pine, plum, and bamboo are considered as the "Three Friends of Winter".

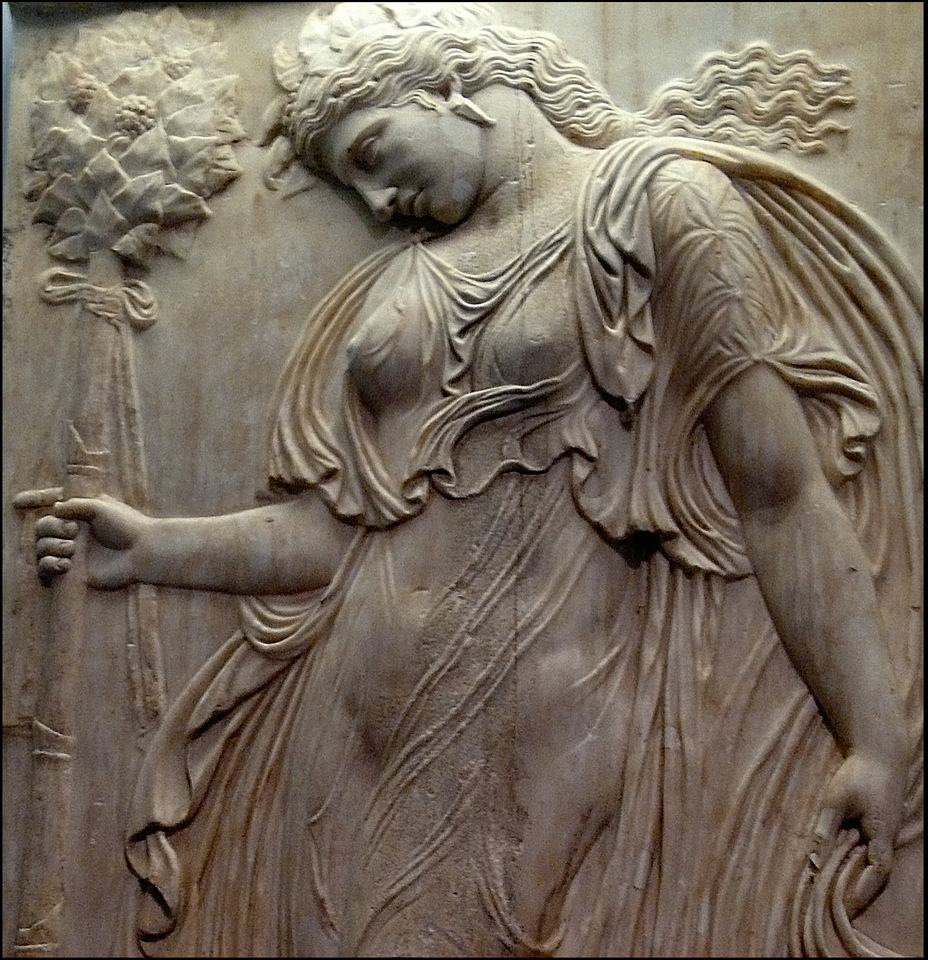
A maenad (follower of Dionysus) holding a thyrsus topped with a pine cone. Roman, 120–140 AD

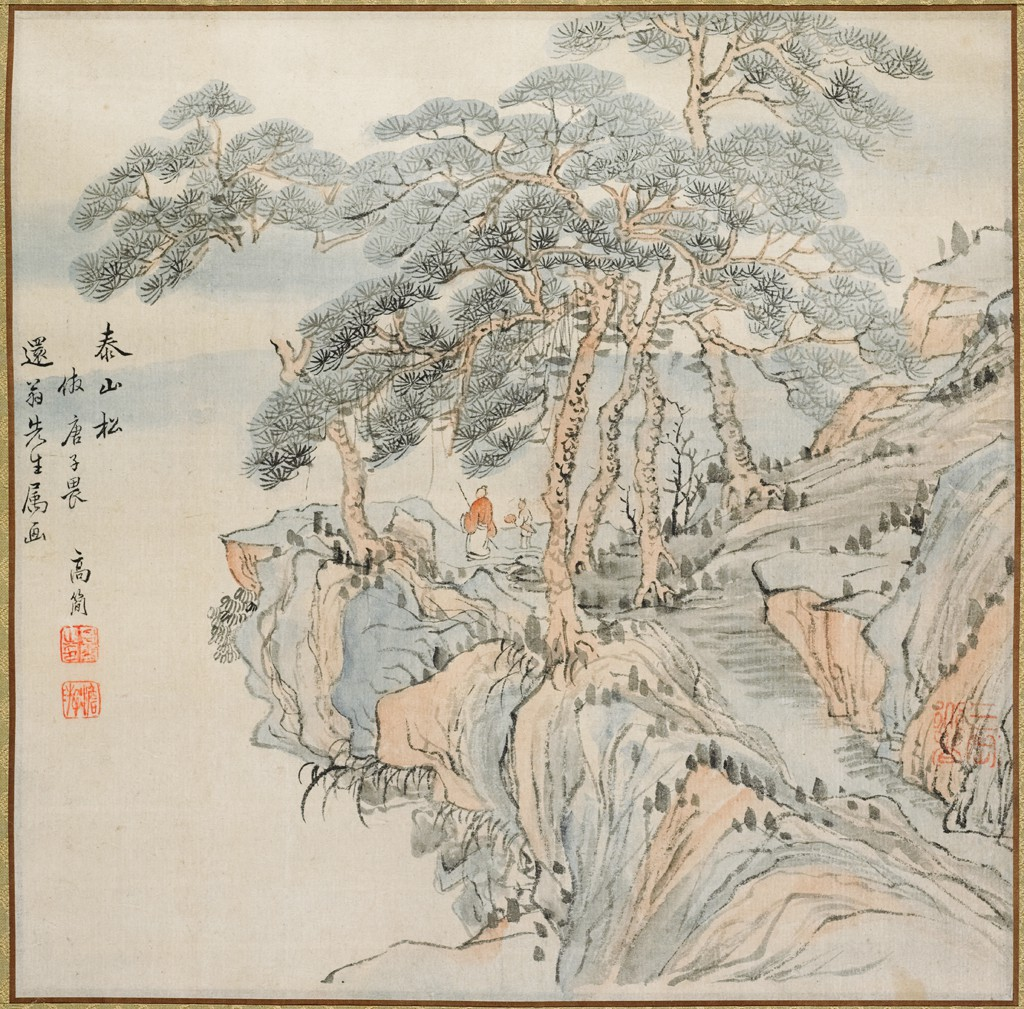
Pines on Mount Tai, Ike no Taiga, Japan, 18th century

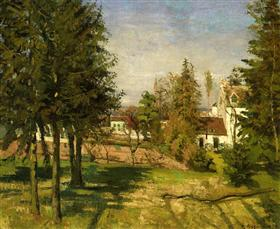
The Pine Trees of Louveciennes, Camille Pissarro, 1870

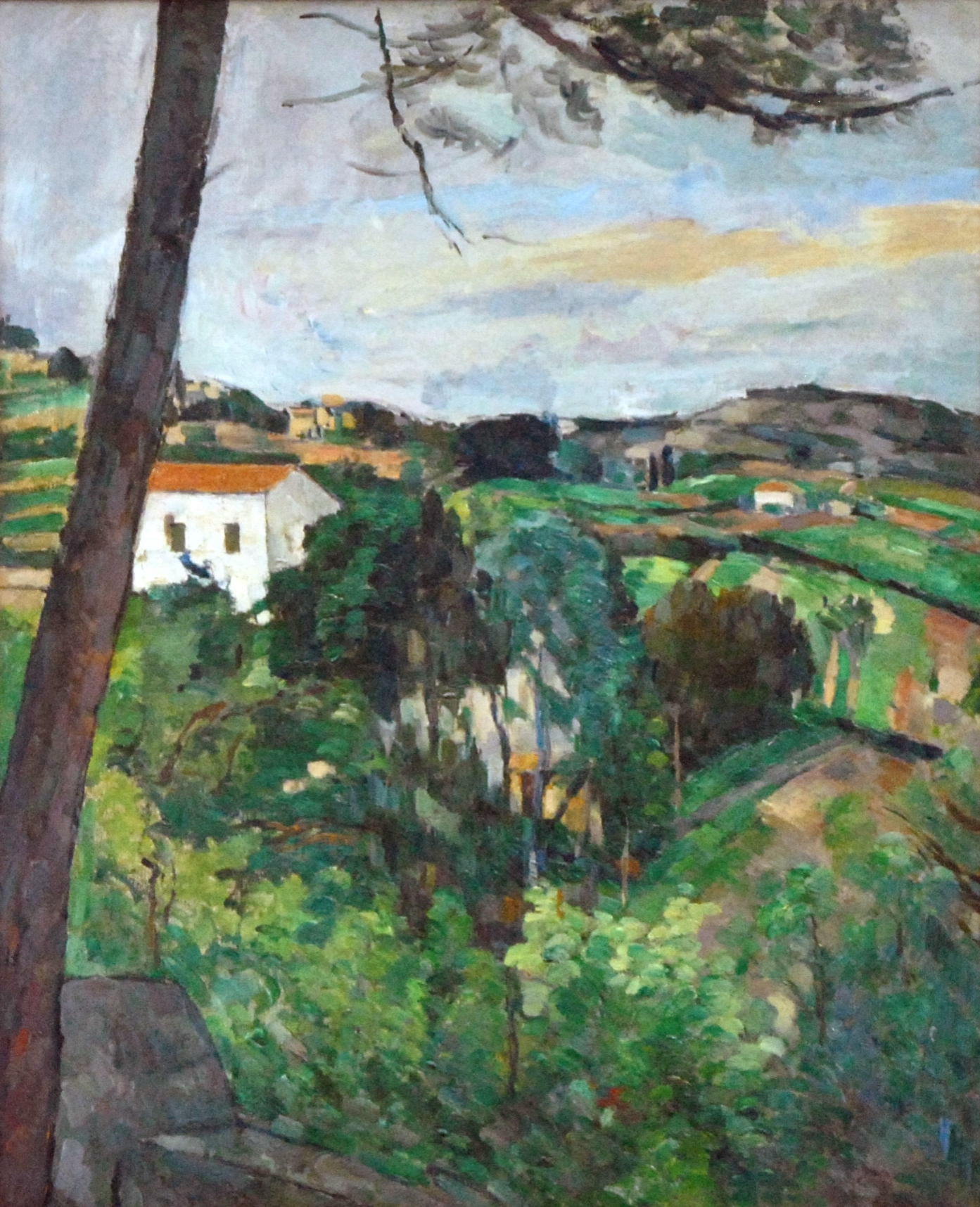
Le pin à l'Estaque,
Paul Cézanne, 1875

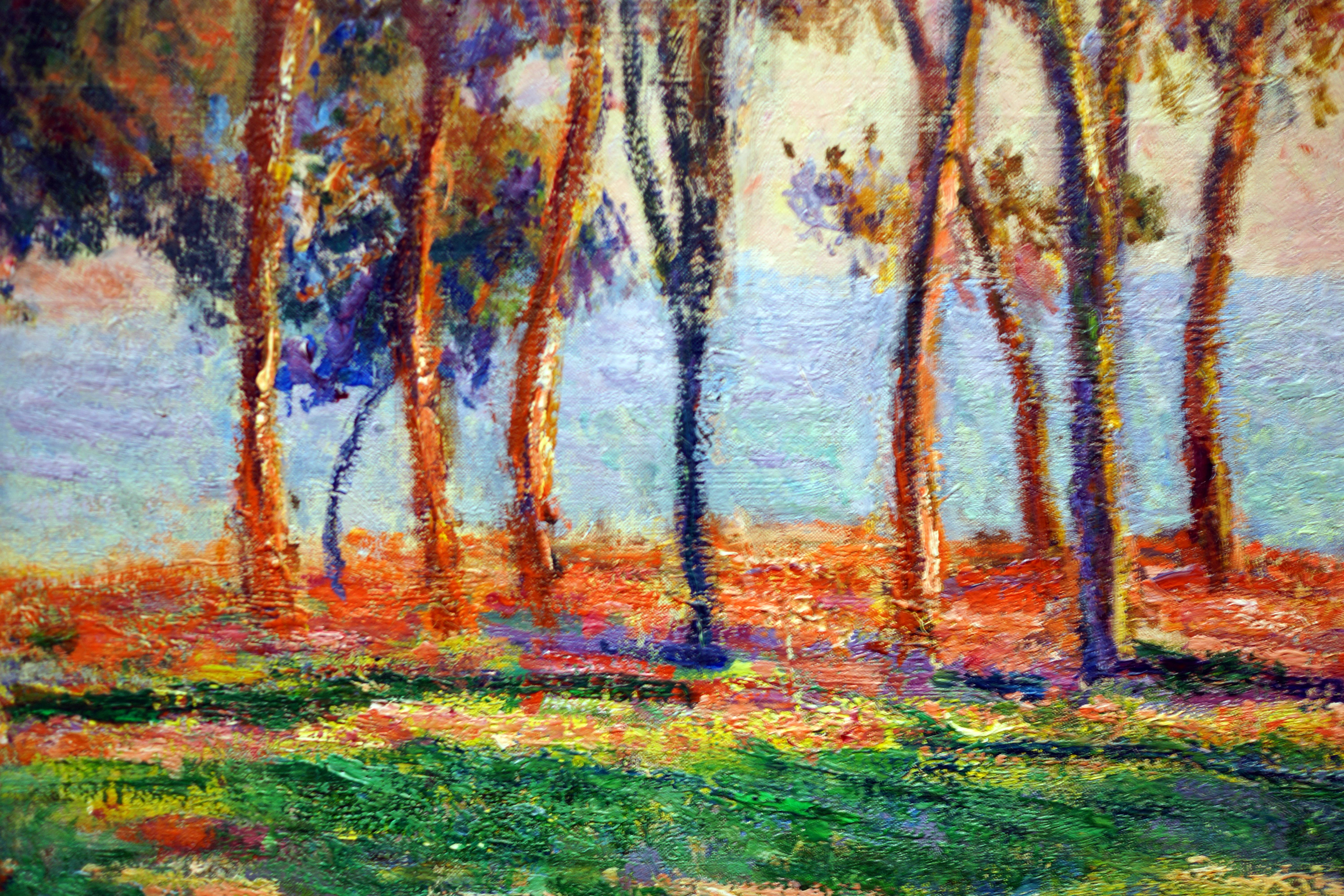
Under the Pines, Evening, Claude Monet, 1888

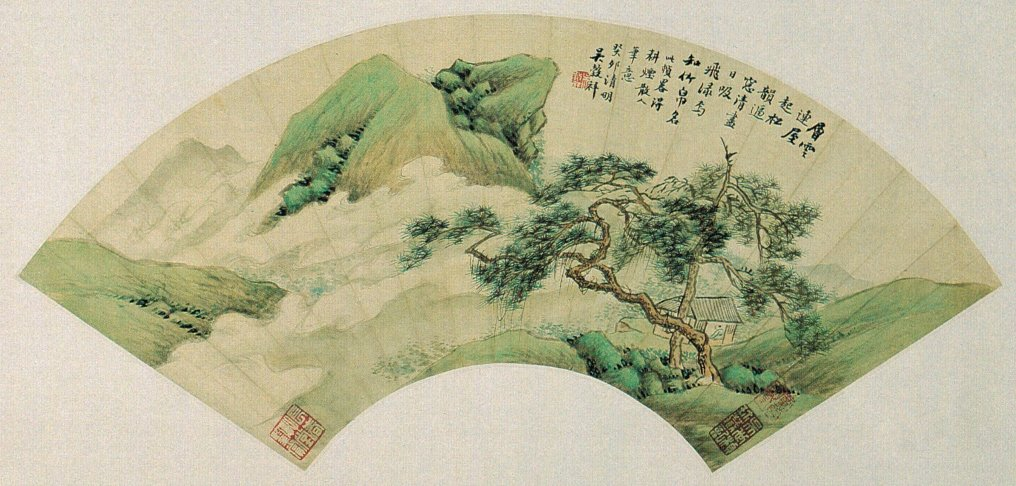
"Pine Clouds", fan painting by Wu Ku-hsiang, China, 1903

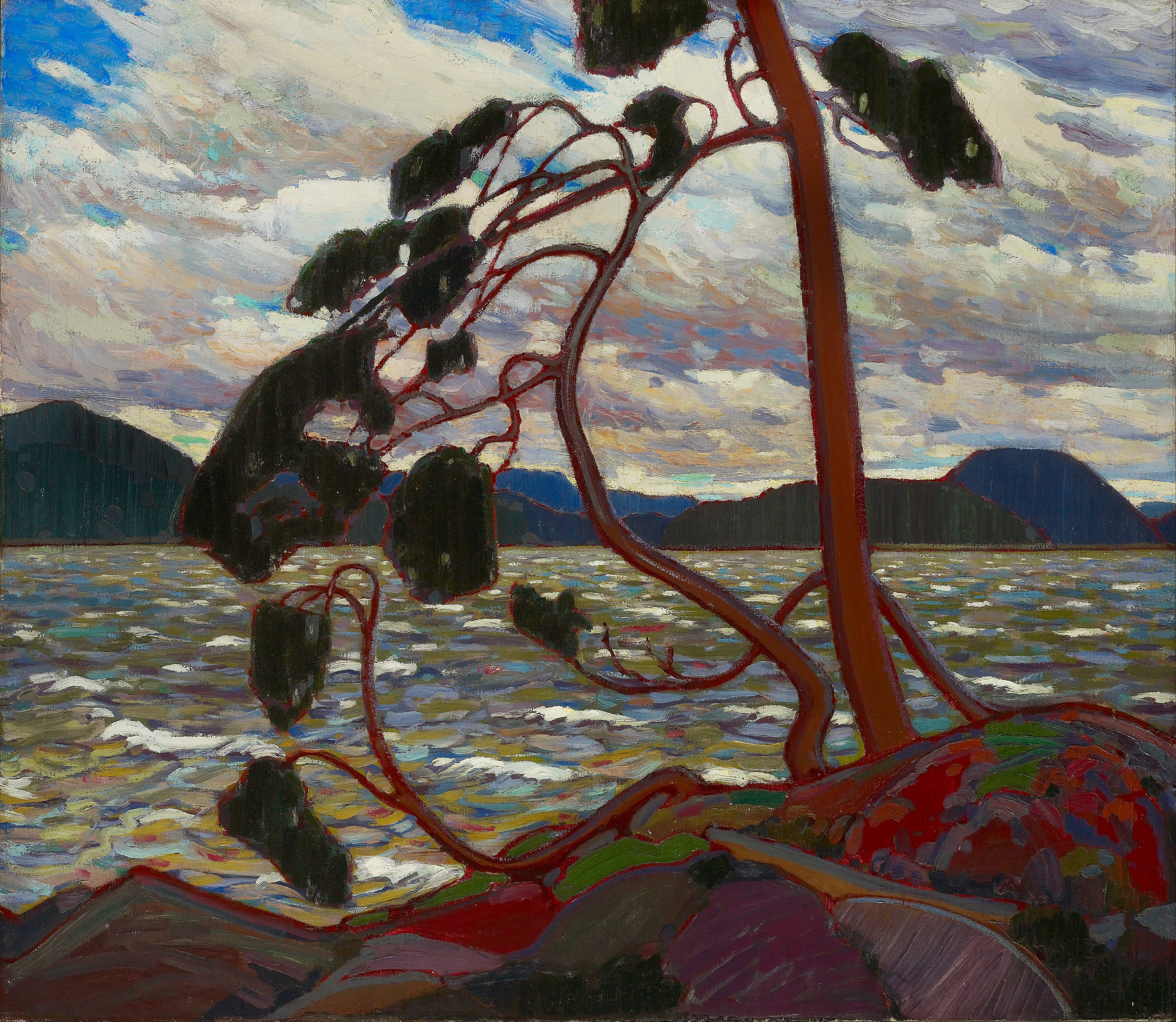
The West Wind,
Tom Thomson, 1917,
depicting Pinus resinosa

== See also ==
- El Pino (The Pine Tree)
- Pine barrens
- Pine-cypress forest
- Pine Tree Flag
- Tree of Peace
