= List of Pinus species =

Pinus, the pines, is a genus of approximately 110–120 extant tree and shrub species. The genus is currently split into two subgenera, subgenus Pinus (hard pines), and subgenus Strobus (soft pines). Each of the subgenera have been further divided into sections and subsections based in the past on morphology, ecology and biogeography, and more recently increasingly from chloroplast DNA sequencing and whole plastid genomic analysis. While the genetic analysis has given robust results at the higher levels, they often give conflicting results lower in the phylogenetic trees, with species allocated to different subsections (and sometimes different sections) by different studies or even within a study. Within subsections, the genetic relationships between species can be even more complex and conflicting; in one study, three samples of the very distinctive and morphologically constant Pinus lambertiana were placed in three different clades of the subsection Strobus, and similar problems with many other species with widespread nonmonophyly.

- Pinus
  - Subgenus Pinus
    - Section Trifoliae
      - Subsection Ponderosae
      - - Subsection Contortae
        - Subsection Australes
    - Section Pinus
      - Subsection Pinus
      - Subsection Pinaster
  - Subgenus Strobus
    - Section Quinquefoliae
      - Subsection Gerardianae
      - - Subsection Krempfianae
        - Subsection Strobus
    - Section Parrya
      - Subsection Nelsonianae
      - - Subsection Balfourianae
        - Subsection Cembroides

Several features are used to distinguish the subgenera, sections, and subsections of pines; the number of leaves (needles) per fascicle, whether the fascicle sheaths are deciduous or persistent, the number of fibrovascular bundles per needle (two in Pinus, one in Strobus), the position of the resin ducts in the needles (internal or external), the presence or shape of the seed wings (rudimentary or effective, articulate or adnate), and the position of the umbo (dorsal or terminal) and presence of a prickle on the scales of the seed cones.

The two subgenera are thought to have ancient divergence from each other, having diverged at some point between the late Jurassic (around 160 million years ago), the mid Cretaceous (around 125 million years ago), to the late Cretaceous (around 100 million years ago).

== Subgenus Pinus ==
Subgenus Pinus includes the yellow and hard pines. Pines in this subgenus have two to five needles per fascicle (rarely as many as eight, in P. durangensis). They have two fibrovascular bundles per needle, and the fascicle sheaths are persistent, except in P. leiophylla and P. lumholtzii. The cone scales are thicker and more rigid than those of subgenus Strobus, and have a resin sealing band before opening (resulting in the cones opening with an audible crack); the cones either open soon after they mature or are serotinous.

=== Section Pinus ===
Section Pinus has two or three needles per fascicle. The cones have moderately thin to thick scales; in most they open at maturity, but are weakly serotinous in some species in subsection Pinaster. Species in this section are native to Europe, Asia, and the Mediterranean, except for P. resinosa in northeastern North America and P. tropicalis in western Cuba.

Subsection Incertae sedis

- †P. driftwoodensis – Early Eocene, British Columbia, Canada

==== Subsection Pinus ====
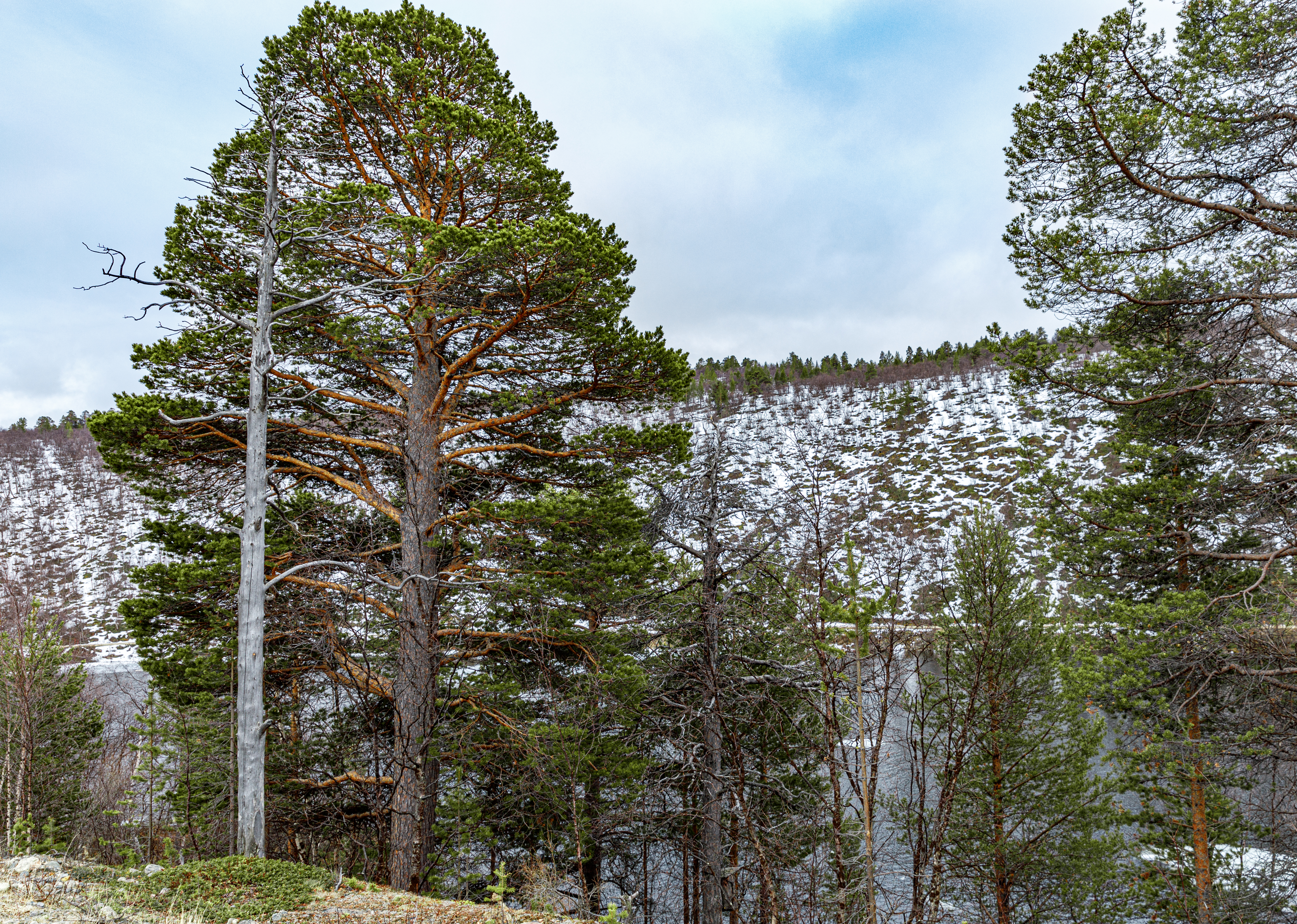
Pinus sylvestris

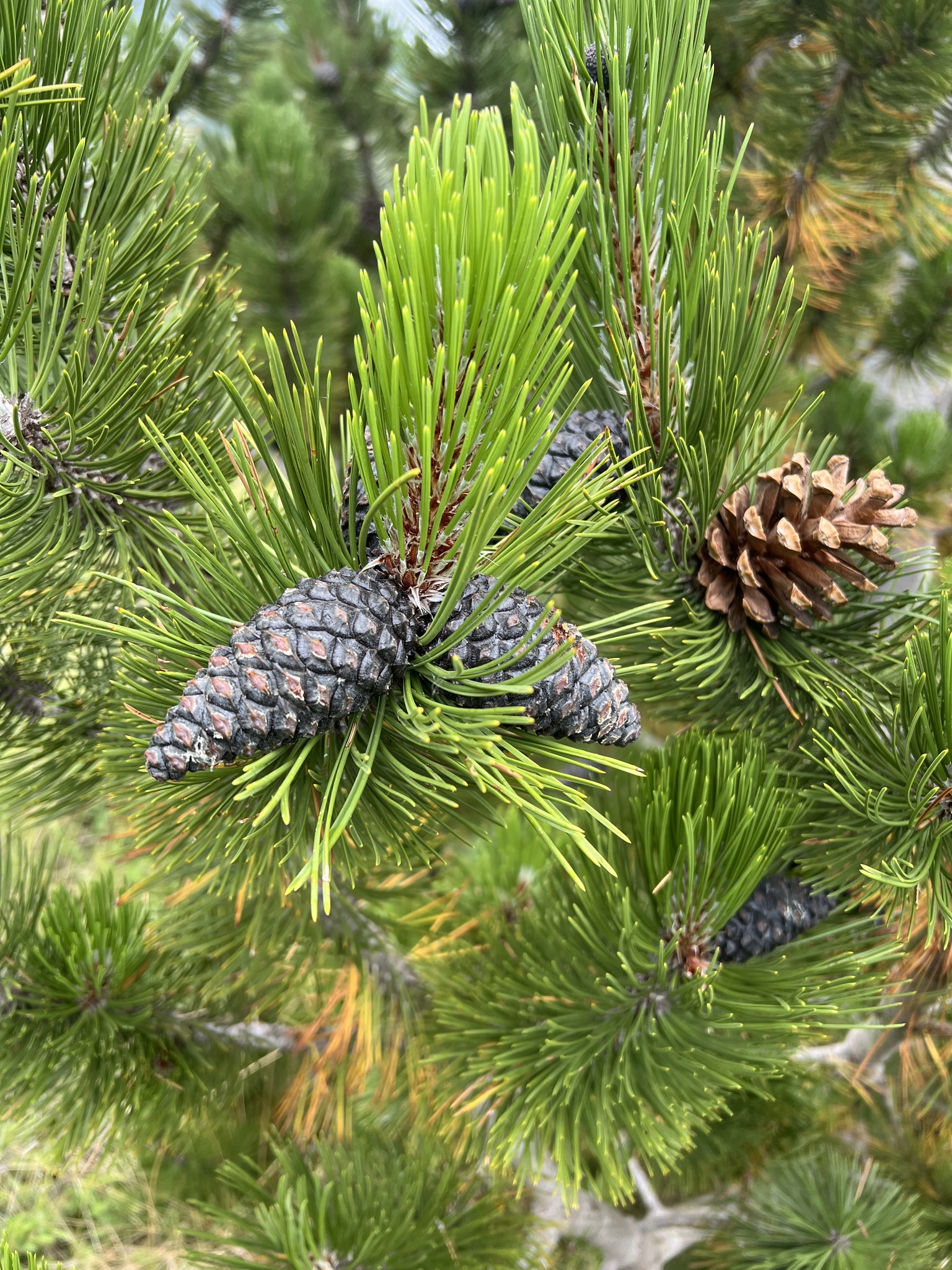
Pinus heldreichii

All but two species (P. resinosa and P. tropicalis) in Subsection Pinus are native to Eurasia. The cones have moderate thickness scales, and are characterised by a slightly off-centre prickle ('excentromucronate') on the umbo.

- †P. allisonii – Early Eocene, British Columbia, Canada
- P. densata – Sikang pine
- P. densiflora – Japanese red pine or Korean red pine
- P. henryi – Henry's pine
- P. hwangshanensis – Huangshan pine
- P. kesiya – Khasi pine
- P. luchuensis – Luchu pine
- P. massoniana – Masson's pine
- P. mugo – mountain pine
  - P. m. subsp. mugo
  - P. m. subsp. uncinata (treated as a separate species P. uncinata by POWO, but with minimal genetic distinction from P. mugo)
- P. nigra – Austrian pine
- †P. princetonensis – Early Eocene, British Columbia, Canada
- P. resinosa – red pine
- P. sylvestris – Scots pine
- P. tabuliformis – Chinese red pine
- P. taiwanensis – Taiwan red pine
- P. thunbergii – Japanese black pine
- P. tropicalis – tropical pine
- P. yunnanensis – Yunnan pine
- †P. prehwangshanensis
- †P. yorkshirensis

==== Subsection Incertae sedis ====
This pine is commonly resolved into subsection Pinaster by genetic studies, but this is in strong conflict with its morphology and ecology, which is much closer to subsection Pinus, or alternatively placed in its own subsection Leucodermes close to subsection Pinus.

- P. heldreichii – Bosnian pine

==== Subsection Incertae sedis ====
These pines are placed in subsection Pinus by some genetic studies, but in subsection Pinaster by others. In morphology and ecology, they belong in the latter group. The subsection Merkusia has also been proposed for them.

- P. latteri – Tenasserim pine
- P. merkusii – Sumatran pine
- P. ustulata – Philippine pine (split from P. merkusii in 2014)

==== Subsection Pinaster ====
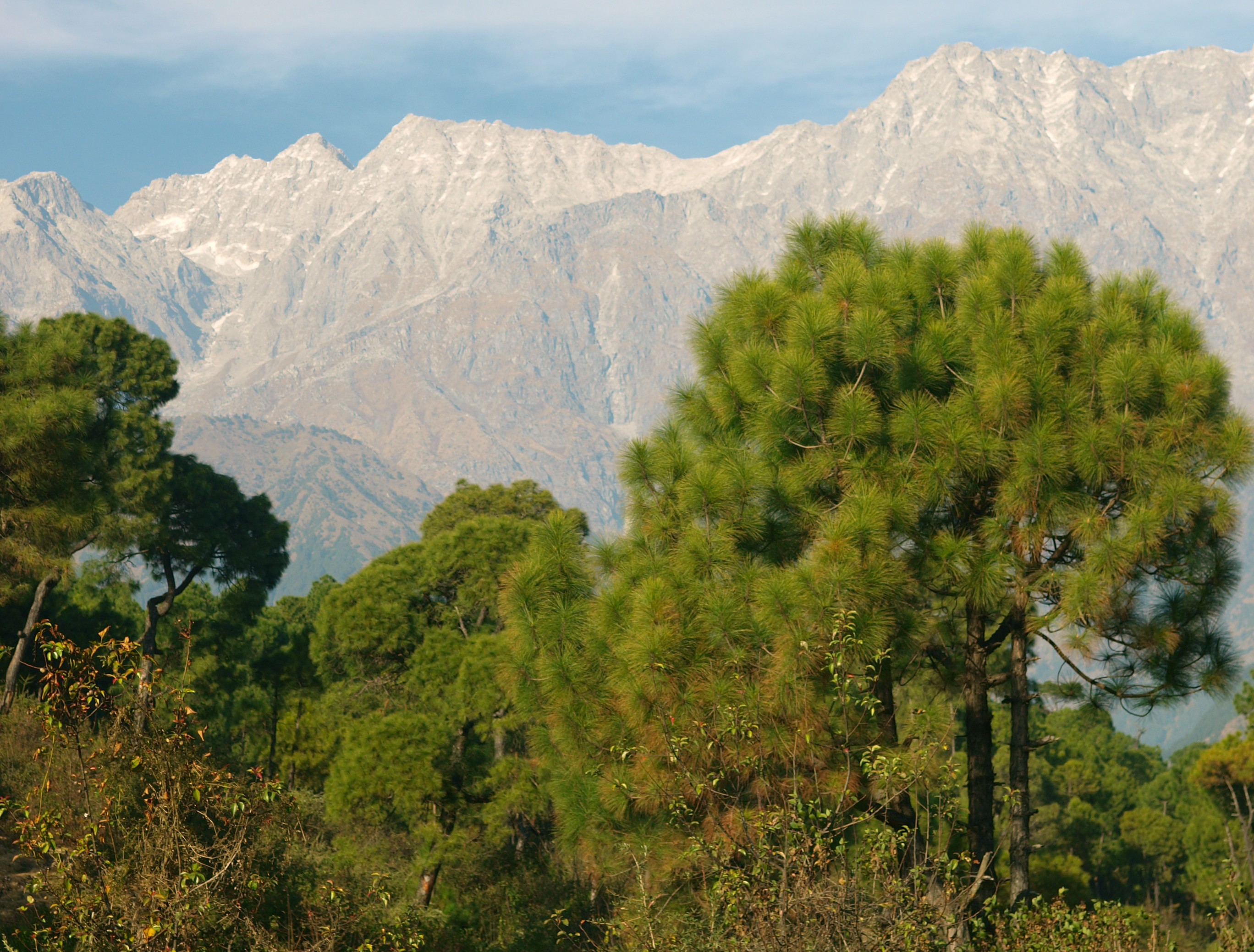
Pinus roxburghii

Subsection Pinaster contains species native to warm climates in the Mediterranean region at low altitudes, as well as P. roxburghii from the Himalayas. The cones are thick-scaled and orange-brown to red-brown, and the cone scales are glossy and lack umbo spines. It is named after P. pinaster.

- P. brutia – Turkish pine
- P. canariensis – Canary Islands pine
- P. halepensis – Aleppo pine
- P. pinaster – maritime pine
- P. pinea – stone pine
- P. roxburghii – chir pine

=== Section Trifoliae ===
Section Trifoliae (American hard pines), despite its name (which means "three-leaved"), has two to five needles per fascicle, or rarely eight. The cones of most species open at maturity, but a few are serotinous. All but two American hard pines belong to this section.

The timing of divergences within this section is disputed, with subsections Australes and Ponderosae having diverged during the mid Cretaceous (about 110 million years ago) according to one study, but not until the mid Oligocene (about 30–35 million years ago) in others.

==== Subsection Attenuatae ====
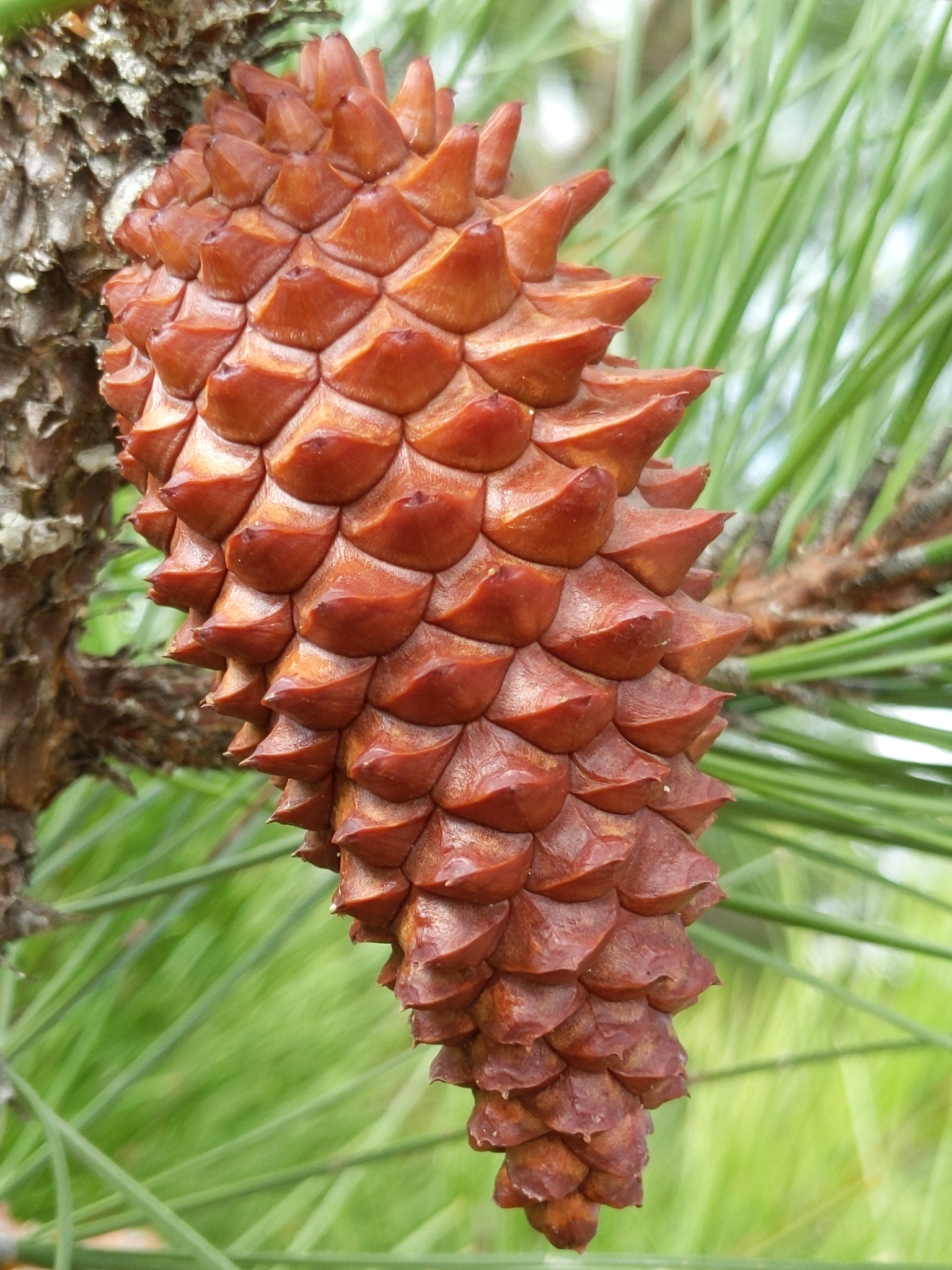
Pinus attenuata

The three closed-cone (serotinous) and fire adapted species of California and Baja California form a small subsection; closely related to, and often included within subsection Australes. Some studies suggest Pinus glabra may also belong here (despite its morphological dissimilarity) though others include it in subsection Australes.

- P. attenuata – knobcone pine
- P. muricata – Bishop pine
- P. radiata – Monterey pine

==== Subsection Australes ====
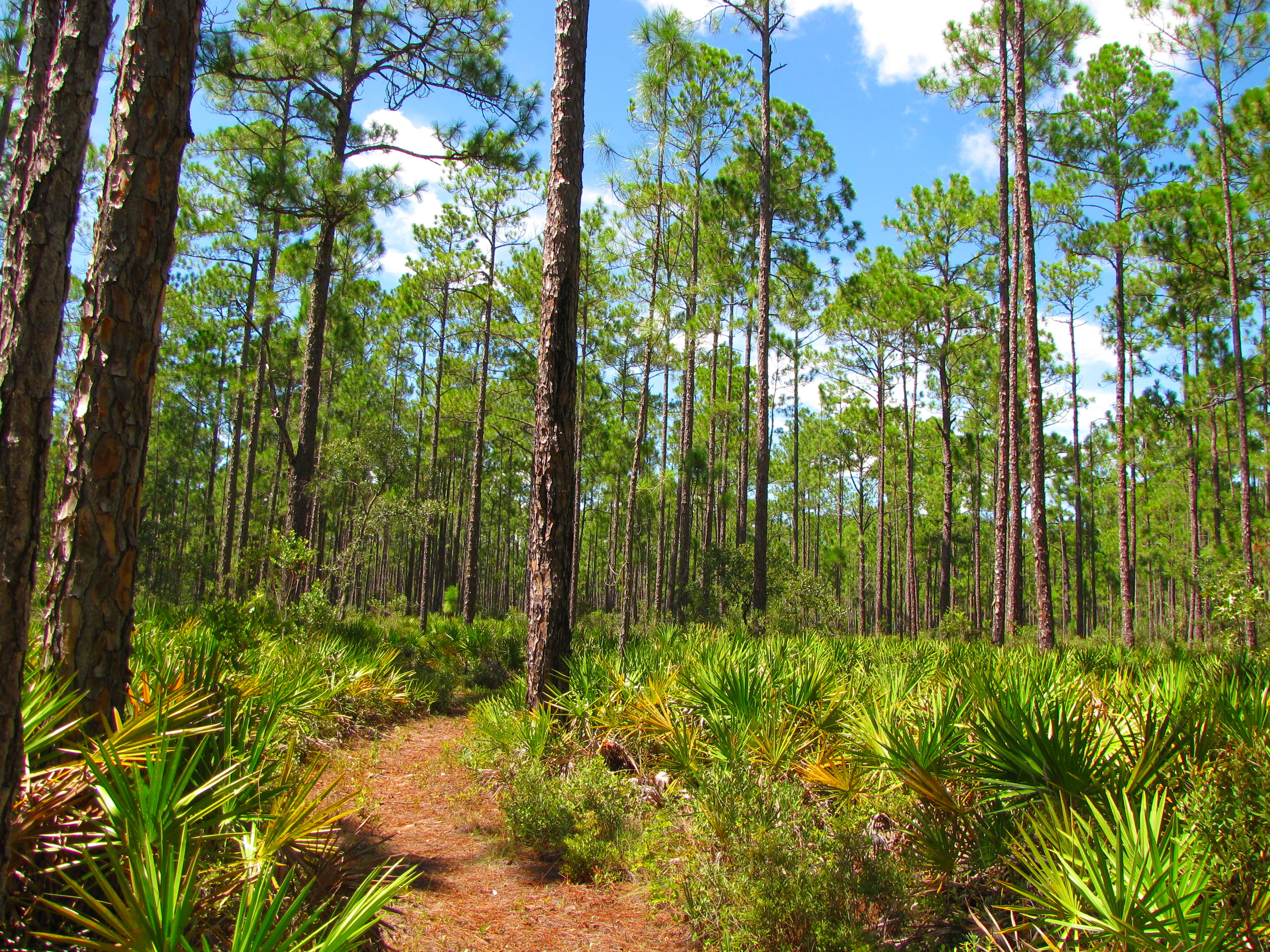
Pinus elliottii

This subsection is native to North and Central America and islands in the Caribbean. It has 26 living species.

- P. caribaea – Caribbean pine
- P. cubensis – Cuban pine
- P. echinata – shortleaf pine
- P. elliottii – slash pine
- P. glabra – spruce pine
- P. georginae
- P. greggii – Gregg's pine
- P. herrerae – Herrera's pine
- P. hondurensis – Honduras pine (treated as a variety of P. caribaea by POWO, but considered distinct by Businský)
- P. jaliscana – Jalisco pine
- P. lawsonii – Lawson's pine
- P. leiophylla – Chihuahua pine
- P. lumholtzii – Lumholtz's pine
- P. luzmariae
- P. occidentalis – Hispaniolan pine
- P. oocarpa – egg-cone pine
- P. palustris – longleaf pine
- P. patula – patula pine
- P. praetermissa – McVaugh's pine
- P. pringlei – Pringle's pine
- P. pungens – table mountain pine
- P. rigida – pitch pine
- P. serotina – pond pine
- P. taeda – loblolly pine
- P. tecunumanii – Tecun Uman's pine
- P. teocote – ocote pine
- P. vallartensis
- †P. foisyi – extinct

==== Subsection Contortae ====
The Contortae are native to North America and Mexico. It contains four accepted species.

- P. banksiana – jack pine
- P. clausa – sand pine
- P. contorta (infraspecific taxa traditionally cited at varietal rank, but with marked divergence in morphology and ecology, better treated at subspecific rank)
  - P. c. subsp. contorta – shore pine
  - P. c. subsp. latifolia – lodgepole pine
  - P. c. subsp. murrayana – tamarack pine
- P. virginiana – Virginia pine
- †P. matthewsii – extinct Pliocene species from Yukon Territory, Canada

==== Subsection Ponderosae ====
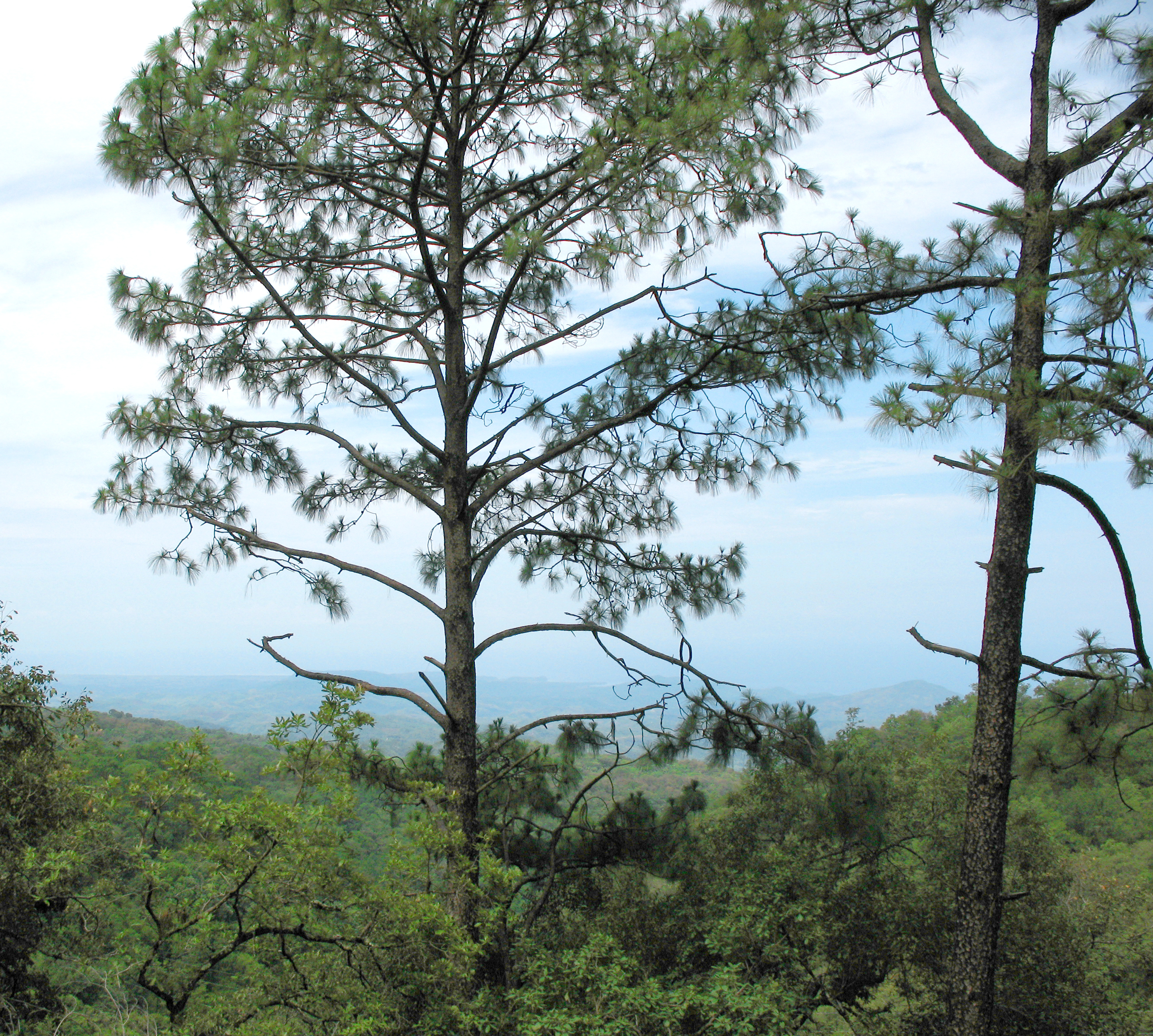
Pinus gordoniana

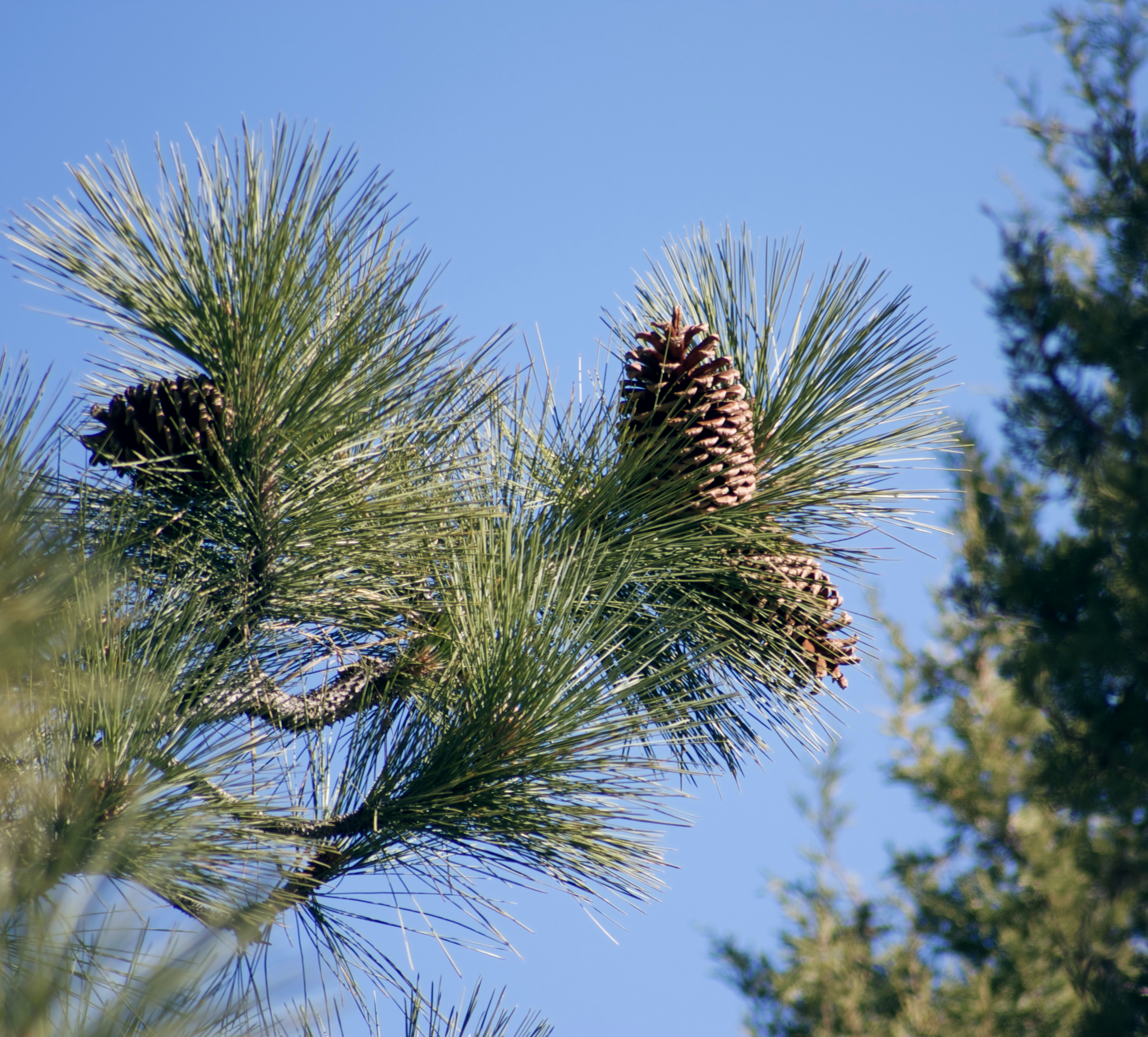
Pinus jeffreyi

This subsection is native to Central America, Mexico, the western United States, and southwestern Canada, although its former range was possibly much wider as evidenced by upper Miocene fossils belonging to this subsection found in Japan It contains at least 13 living species and may contain five more if the disputed species become widely accepted.

- †P. andersonii – Early Eocene, British Columbia, Canada
- P. arizonica – Arizona pine
- P. cooperi – Cooper's pine
- P. devoniana – Michoacan pine
- P. durangensis – Durango pine
- P. engelmannii – Apache pine
- P. estevezii – (not currently accepted by POWO)
- P. gordoniana – Gordon's pine
- P. hartwegii – Hartweg's pine
- P. martinezii – (not accepted)
- P. maximinoi – thinleaf pine
- P. montezumae – Montezuma pine
- P. ponderosa – ponderosa pine
  - P. p. subsp. benthamiana – Pacific ponderosa
  - P. p. subsp. brachyptera – Southwestern ponderosa (disputed, P. brachyptera in POWO and a subspecies in GRIN)
  - P. p. subsp. ponderosa – Columbia Basin ponderosa
  - P. p. subsp. readiana – central high plains ponderosa
  - P. p. subsp. scopulorum – Rocky Mountain ponderosa (disputed, P. scopulorum in POWO and a subspecies in GRIN)
- P. pseudostrobus – smooth-bark Mexican pine
  - P. pseudostrobus var. apulcensis (syn. P. oaxacana; currently treated as a variety of P. pseudostrobus by POWO)
- P. stormiae – Storm's pine
- P. yecorensis – Yecora pine
- †P. fujiii
- †P. johndayensis – Oligocene

==== Subsection Sabinianae ====
These are pines of the western United States and Mexico with four existing species. Within the subsection the Coulter pine is closely related with the Jeffery pine and the gray pine is likewise paired with the Torrey pine.

- P. coulteri – Coulter pine
- P. jeffreyi – Jeffrey pine
- P. sabiniana – gray pine
- P. torreyana – Torrey pine

== Subgenus Strobus ==
Subgenus Strobus includes the white and soft pines. Pines in this subgenus have one to five needles per fascicle and one fibrovascular bundle per needle, and the fascicle sheaths are deciduous, except in P. nelsonii, where they are persistent. Cone scales are thinner and more flexible than those of subgenus Pinus, except in some species like P. maximartinezii, and cones usually open soon after they mature.

=== Section Nelsonia ===
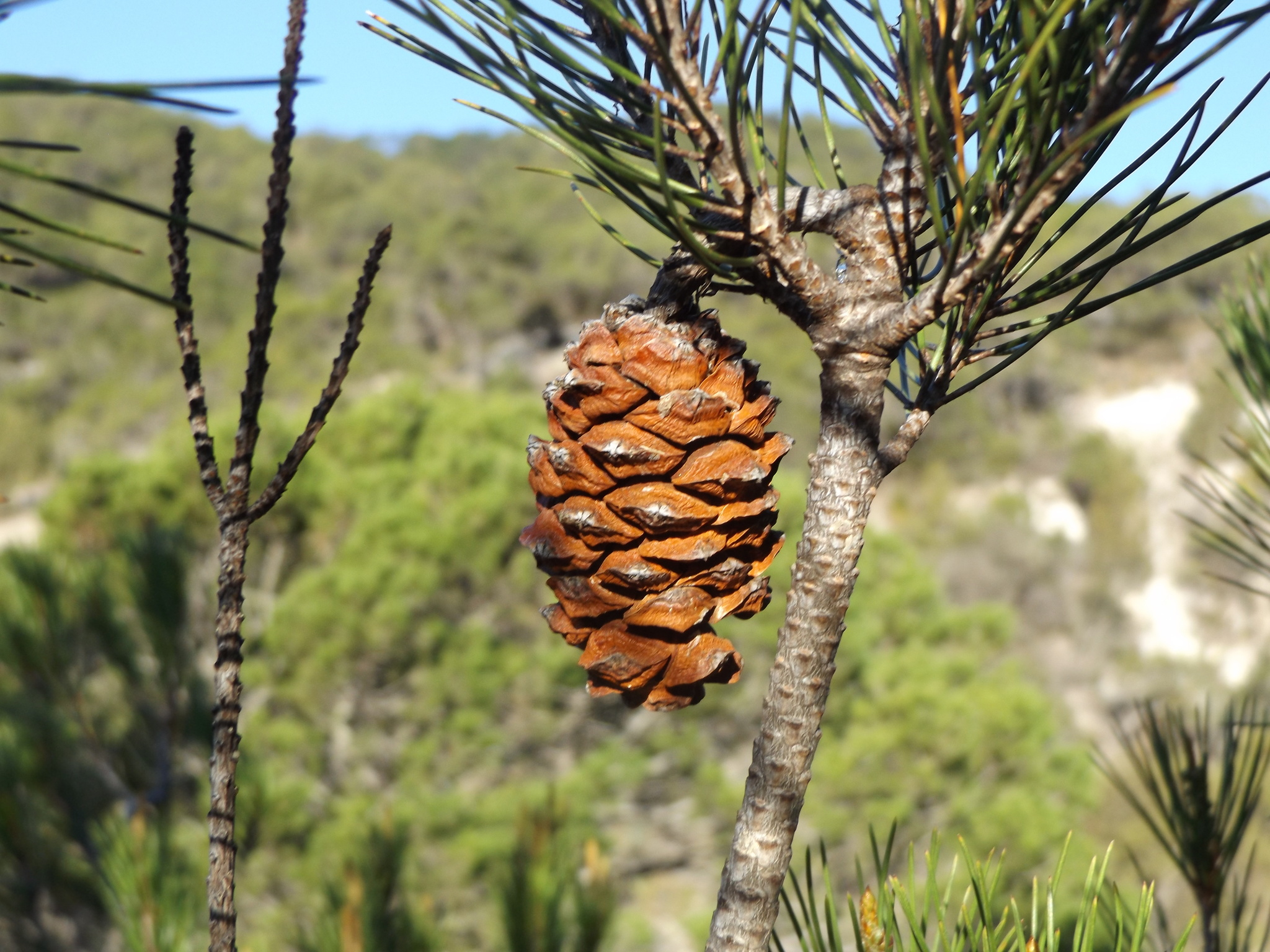
Pinus nelsonii

This unique pine is remarkable in differing from all other pines in multiple cone and foliage characters. Genetically, its position has varied between and within studies; three nuclear genes and chloroplast DNA placed it as sister taxon to the rest of Section Parrya, while a late embryogenesis abundant (LEA)-like gene (IFG8612) resolved it as sister to Section Quinquefoliae; another study resolved it as sister to Subsection Balfourianae. It has probably evolved separately from the rest of the genus since the late Eocene, with its most recent common ancestor around 37 million years ago. These unique characters warrant recognition as a monotypic section.

==== Subsection Nelsonianae ====
Subsection Nelsonianae is native to northeastern Mexico. It consists of the single species with persistent fascicle sheaths.

- P. nelsonii – Nelson's pinyon

=== Section Parrya ===
Section Parrya has one to five needles per fascicle. The seeds have articulate (jointed) wings; in most, the wing is vestigial, and remains attached to the cone scale when the seed is released apparently wingless. In all species, the fascicle sheaths curl back to form a rosette before falling away. The cones have thick scales (thin in subsection Balfourianae) and release the seeds at maturity. This section is native to the southwestern United States and Mexico.

==== Subsection Balfourianae ====
Subsection Balfourianae (bristlecone and foxtail pines) is native to southwest United States.

- P. aristata – Rocky Mountains bristlecone pine
- P. balfouriana – foxtail pine
- †P. crossii - (Chattian; Creede Formation, Colorado)
- P. longaeva – Great Basin bristlecone pine

==== Subsection Rzedowskiae ====
The 'big-cone' pinyons, with larger cones than subsection Cembroides.

- P. maximartinezii – big-cone pinyon
- P. pinceana – weeping pinyon
- P. rzedowskii – Rzedowski's pinyon

==== Subsection Cembroides ====
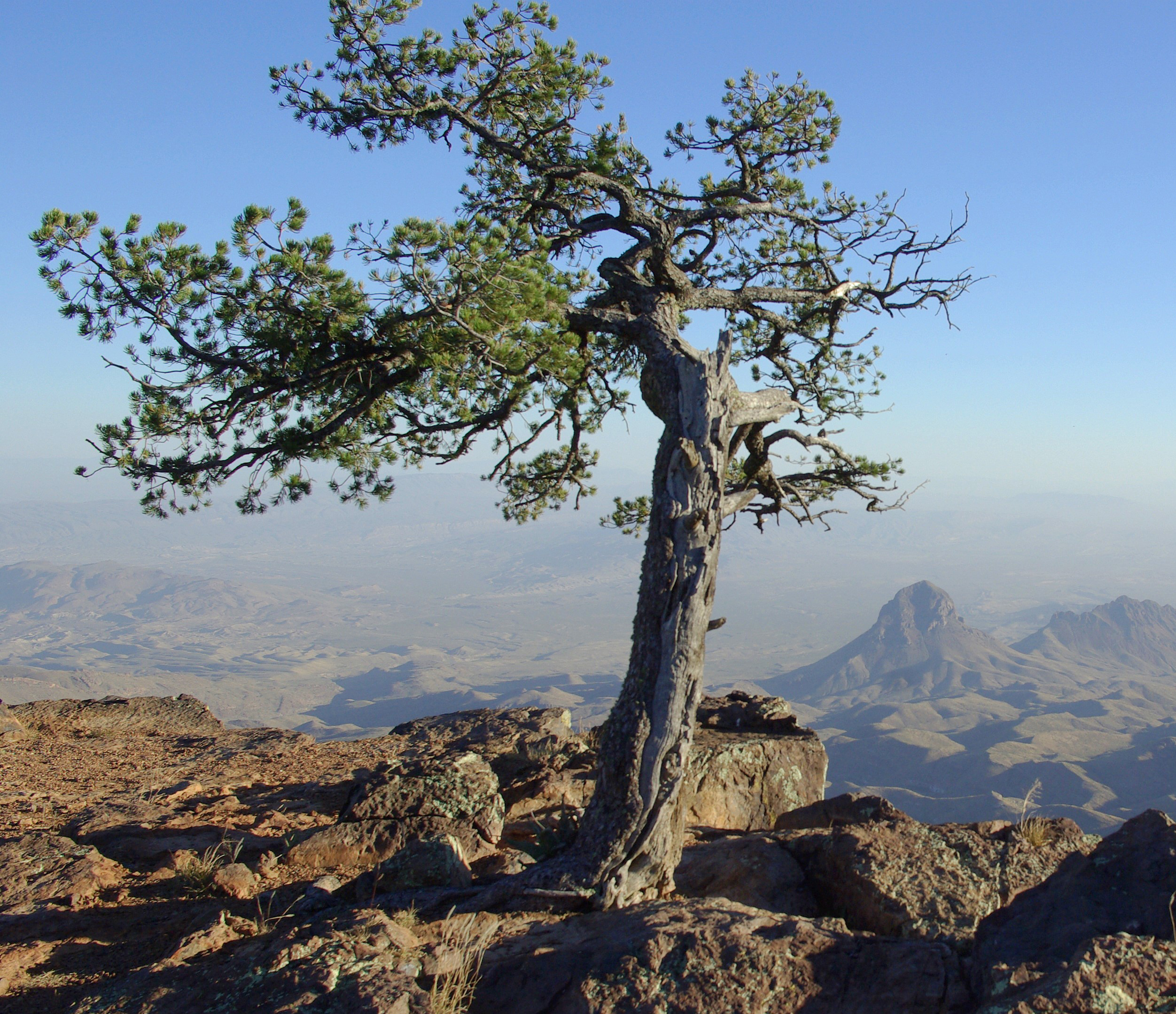
Pinus cembroides

Subsection Cembroides (pinyons or piñons) is native to Mexico and the southwestern United States.

- P. cembroides – Mexican pinyon
- P. culminicola – Potosi pinyon
- P. discolor – border pinyon
- P. edulis – Colorado pinyon
- P. johannis – Johann's pinyon
- P. monophylla – single-leaf pinyon
- P. orizabensis – Orizaba pinyon
- P. quadrifolia – Parry pinyon
- P. remota – Texas pinyon or papershell pinyon

=== Section Quinquefoliae ===
Section Quinquefoliae (white pines), as its name (which means "five-leaved") suggests, has five needles per fascicle except for P. krempfii, which has two, and P. gerardiana and P. bungeana, which have three. All species have cones with thin or thick scales that open at maturity or do not open at all; none are serotinous. Species in this section are found in Eurasia and North America, and one species, P. chiapensis reaches Guatemala.

==== Subsection Gerardianae ====
Subsection Gerardianae is native to East Asia. It has three or five needles per fascicle.

- P. bungeana – lacebark pine
- P. gerardiana – chilgoza pine
- P. squamata – Qiaojia pine

==== Subsection Krempfianae ====
Subsection Krempfianae is currently native to Vietnam, with a fossil record extending into the Oligocene. It has two needles per fascicle, and they are atypically flattened. The cone scales are thick and have no prickles. Until 2021, the subsection was considered monotypic, when an Oligocene fossil species was described from Yunnan Province, China.

- P. krempfii – Krempf's pine
- †P. leptokrempfii – Oligocene

==== Subsection Strobus ====
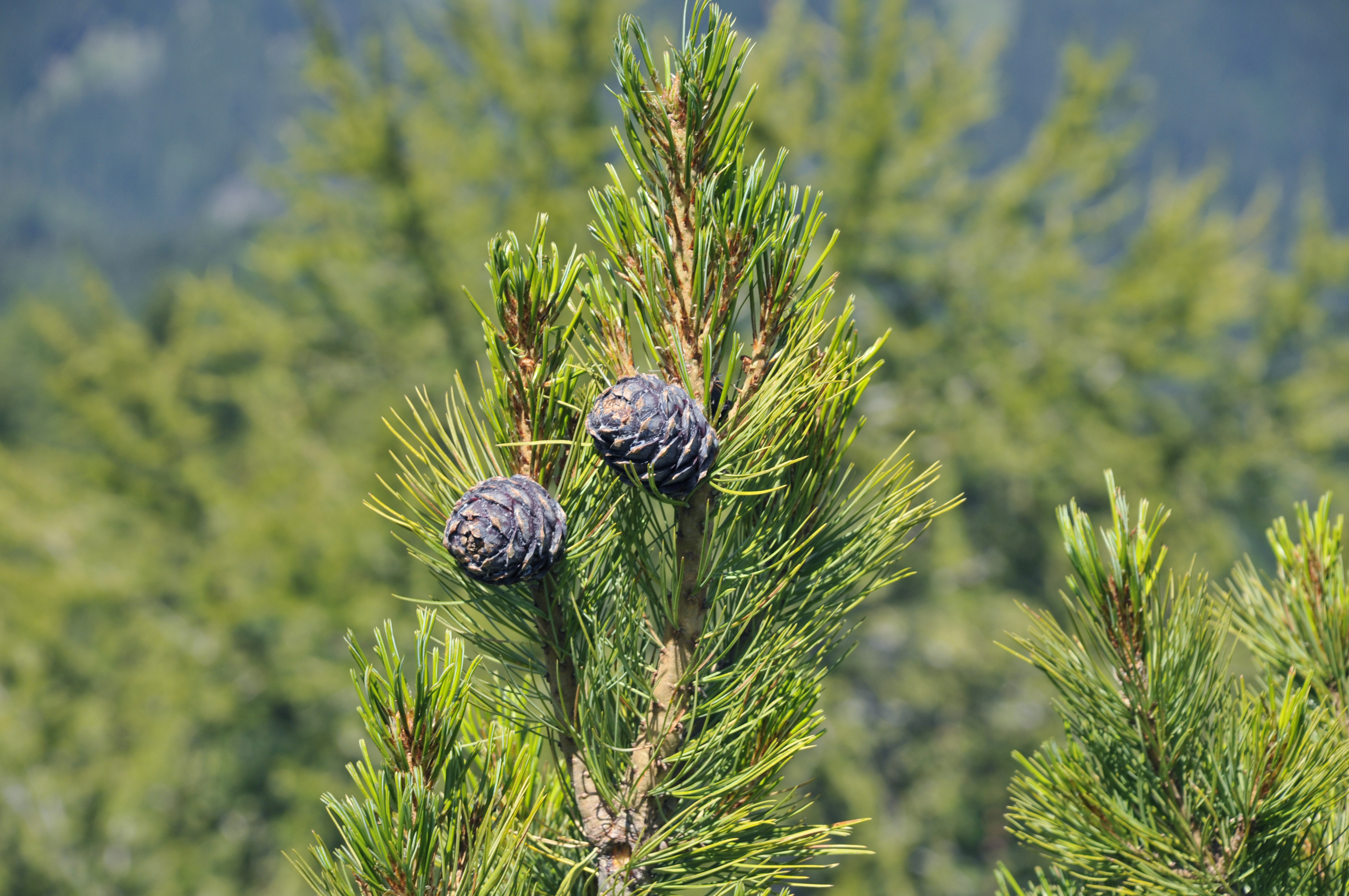
Pinus cembra

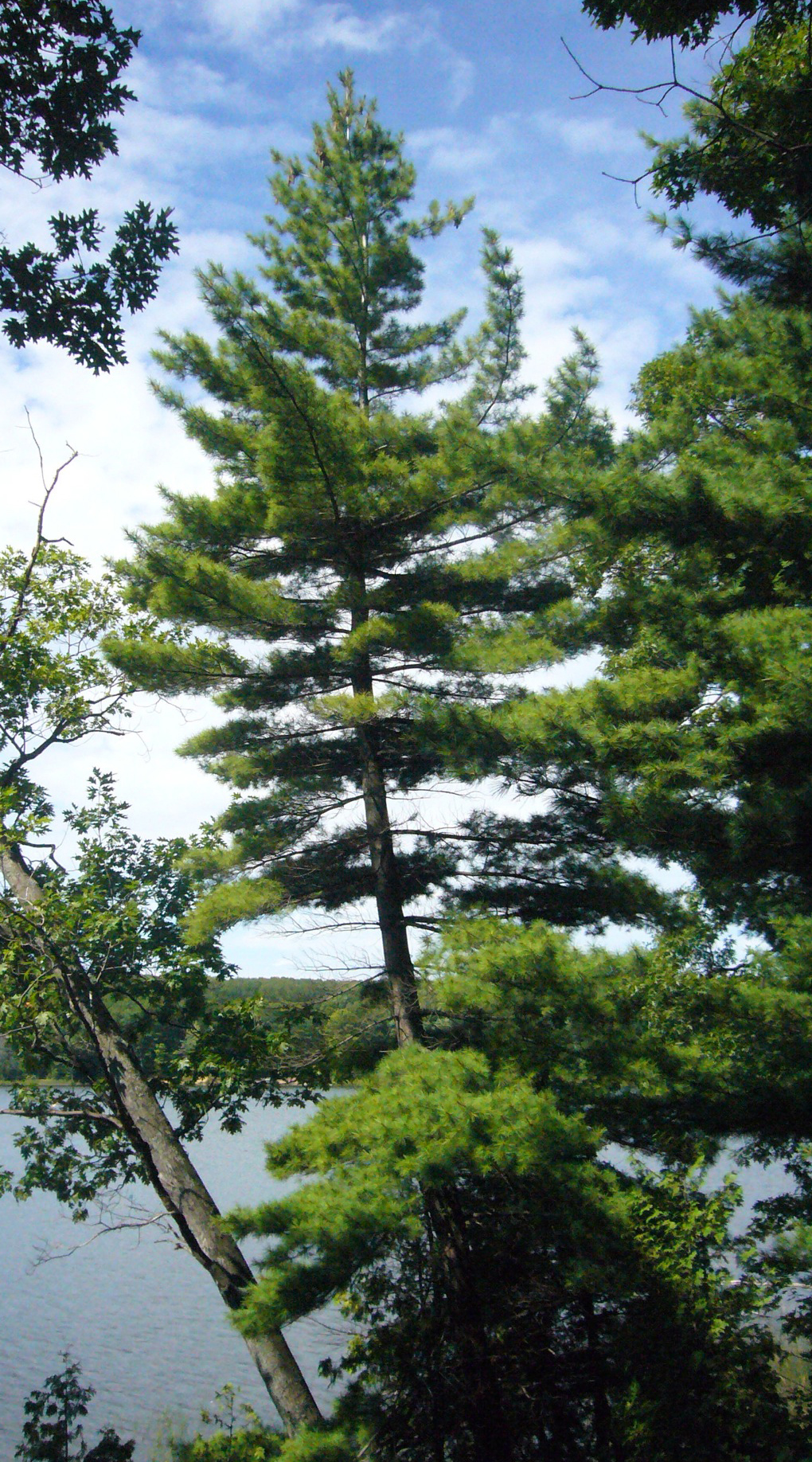
Pinus strobus

Subsection Strobus has five needles per fascicle and thin cone scales with no prickles. Needles tend to be flexible and soft with slightly lighter side underneath. It is native to North and Central America, Europe, and Asia.

- P. albicaulis – whitebark pine
- P. amamiana – Yakushima white pine
- P. armandii – Chinese white pine
- P. arunachalensis
- P. ayacahuite – Mexican white pine
- P. bhutanica – Bhutan white pine
- P. cembra – Swiss pine
- P. chiapensis – Chiapas pine
- P. dabeshanensis – Dabieshan pine
- P. dalatensis – Vietnamese white pine
- P. fenzeliana – Hainan white pine
- P. flexilis – limber pine
- P. koraiensis – Korean pine
- P. lambertiana – sugar pine
- P. monticola – western white pine
- P. morrisonicola – Taiwan white pine
- P. parviflora – Japanese white pine
- P. peuce – Macedonian pine
- P. pumila – Siberian dwarf pine
- P. ravii
- P. reflexa – Southwestern white pine
- P. sibirica – Siberian pine
- P. strobus – eastern white pine
- P. strobiformis – Chihuahuan white pine
- P. stylesii – Styles's white pine
- P. veitchii – Veitch's pine
- P. wallichiana – blue pine
- P. wangii – Guangdong white pine
- †P. longlingensis – Late Pliocene, Mangbang Formation – Yunnan, China

== Incertae sedis ==
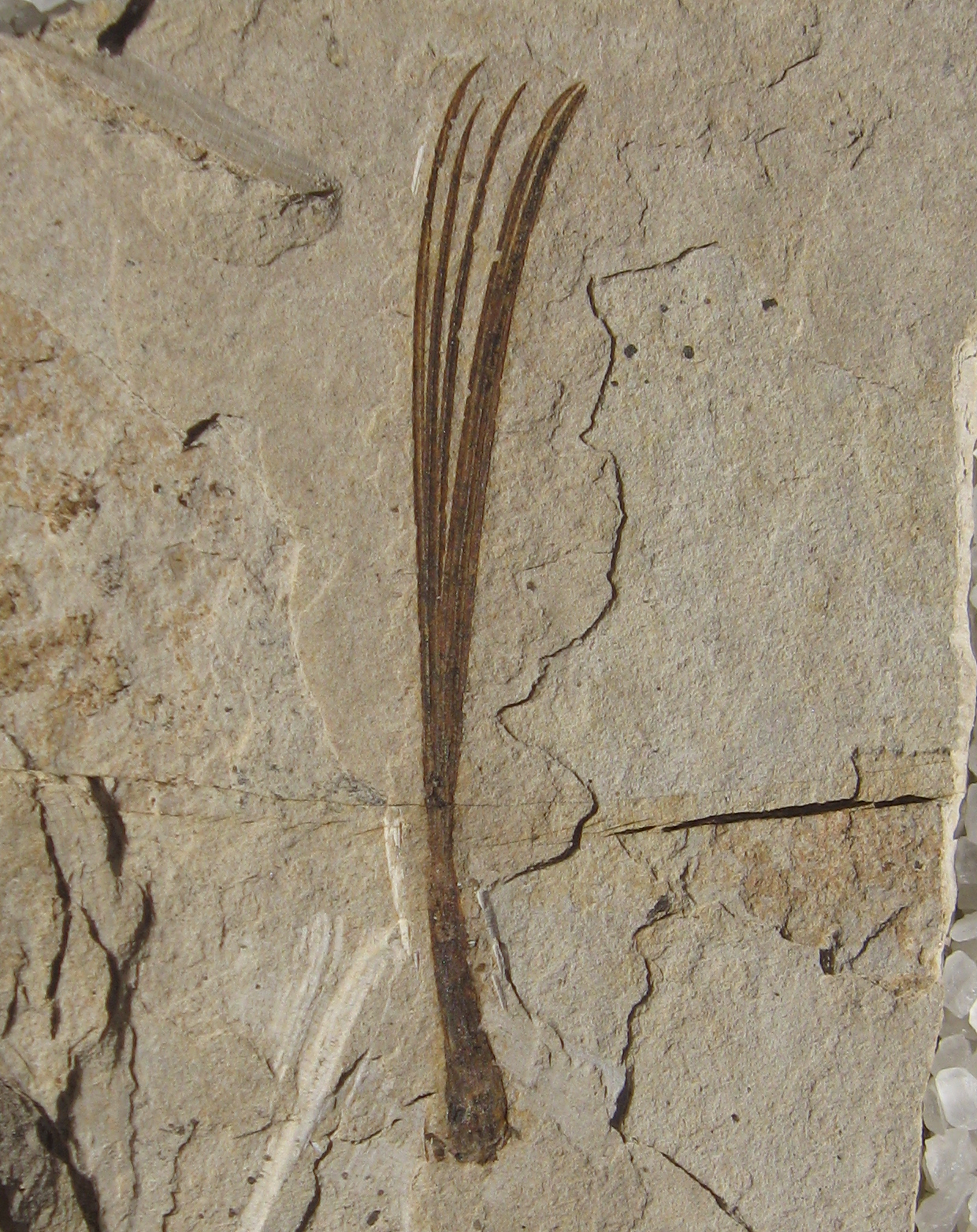
Pinus latahensis

Species which are not placed in a subgenus at this time.

- †Pinus arnoldii (syn. P. similkameenensis) – Early Eocene, Allenby Formation – Okanagan Highlands Floras
- †Pinus columbiana - Early Eocene, Kettle River Formation – Okanagan Highlands Floras
- †Pinus latahensis – Early Eocene, Klondike Mountain Formation, Allenby Formation – Okanagan Highlands Floras
- †Pinus macrophylla – Early Eocene, Klondike Mountain Formation, Allenby Formation – Okanagan Highlands Floras
- †Pinus monticolensis – Early Eocene, Klondike Mountain Formation, Allenby Formation – Okanagan Highlands Floras
- †Pinus peregrinus – Middle Eocene, Golden Valley Formation, North Dakota, US
- †Pinus tetrafolia – Early Eocene, Klondike Mountain Formation – Okanagan Highlands Floras
- †Pinus trunculus – Early Eocene, Allenby Formation – Okanagan Highlands Floras
- †Pinus tulameenensis – Early Eocene, multiple sites – Okanagan Highlands Floras

== See also ==
- Hybridization in pines (list of pine hybrids)
