= Pinus leptokrempfii =

Pinus leptokrempfii Temporal range: Oligocene

Scientific classification
- Kingdom: Plantae
- Clade: Tracheophytes
- Clade: Gymnosperms
- Division: Pinophyta
- Class: Pinopsida
- Order: Pinales
- Family: Pinaceae
- Genus: Pinus
- Subgenus: P. subg. Strobus
- Section: P. sect. Quinquefoliae
- Subsection: P. subsect. Krempfianae
- Species: P. leptokrempfii

Binomial name
- Pinus leptokrempfii Zhang

Species of extinct conifer

Pinus leptokrempfii was a species of large-sized conifer in the family Pinaceae. It was an early relative of Pinus krempfii, being present in the Oligocene Period. The extinct species had shorter, narrower needles than Pinus krempfii, which is where the name "leptokrempfii" derived for "lepto" means "short and narrow". The first specimens were described in the Yunnan Province, China, where fossils revealed the noticeable trait of flat needles, like Pinus krempfii. Pinus krempfii evolved to survive in warmer climates, such as northern Vietnam, where it broke off of Pinus leptokrempfii after the Oligocene Period. The fossils of the species were discovered by Jian-Wei Zhang (Chinese botanist) in 2021, and was eventually placed in the Pinus subsect. Krempfianae.
