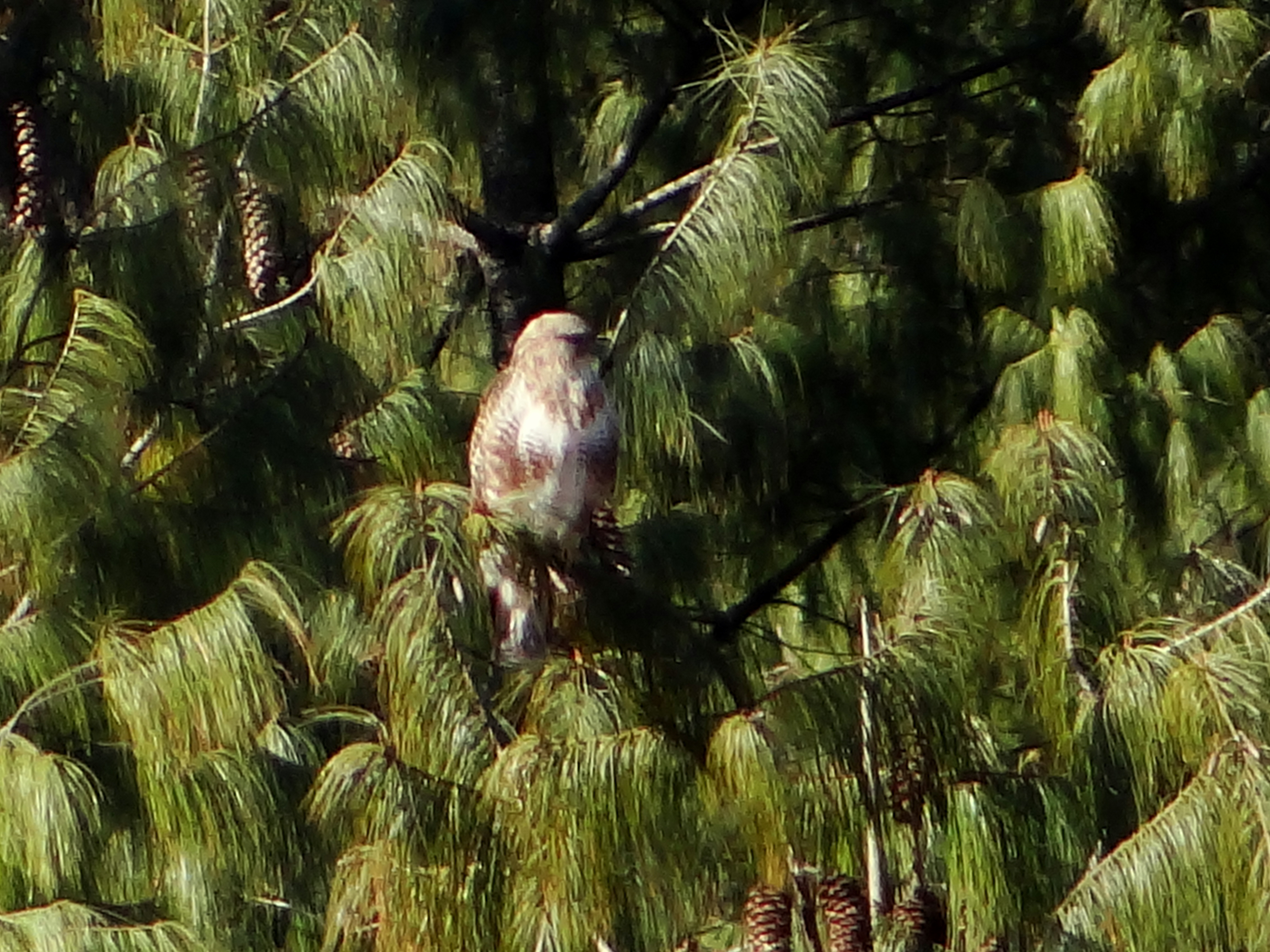
- Himalayan buzzard (Buteo burmanicus) on Pinus bhutanica

Conservation status
- Least Concern (IUCN 3.1)

Scientific classification
- Kingdom: Plantae
- Clade: Tracheophytes
- Clade: Gymnospermae
- Division: Pinophyta
- Class: Pinopsida
- Order: Pinales
- Family: Pinaceae
- Genus: Pinus
- Subgenus: P. subg. Strobus
- Section: P. sect. Quinquefoliae
- Subsection: P. subsect. Strobus
- Species: P. bhutanica

Binomial name
- Pinus bhutanica Grierson, Long & Page

= Pinus bhutanica =

Bhutan white pine

Species of conifer

Pinus bhutanica, which may be called the Bhutan white pine, is a tree restricted to Bhutan and adjacent parts of northeast India (Arunachal Pradesh) and southwest China (Yunnan and Tibet). Along with the related Pinus wallichiana it is a constituent of lower altitude blue pine forests. This pine reaches a height of 76 meters. Note that P. wallichiana is sometimes called by the common name 'Bhutan pine'.

The needles are in bundles of five, up to 25 cm long. The cones are 12–20 cm in length, with thin scales; the seeds are 5–6 mm long, with a 20–25 mm wing. It differs from P. wallichiana in the much longer, strongly drooping needles, and the cones being slightly smaller and red-brown, rather than yellow-buff, when mature. It is also adapted to generally warmer, wetter climates at lower altitudes, with an intense summer monsoon. Despite the two being closely related and at least occasionally growing together, no hybrids or intermediates have ever been reported.
