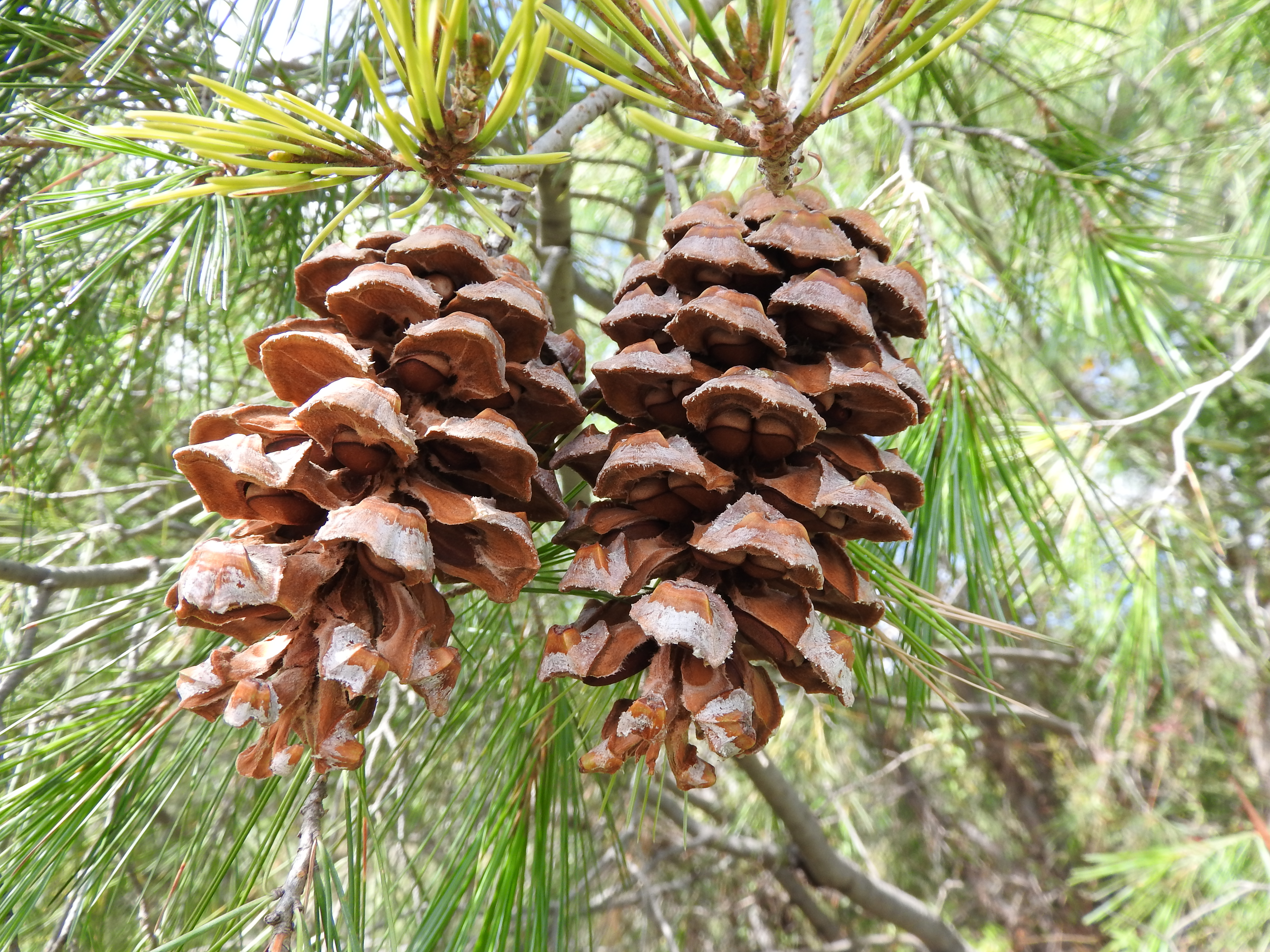

Conservation status
- Near Threatened (IUCN 3.1)

Scientific classification
- Kingdom: Plantae
- Clade: Embryophytes
- Clade: Tracheophytes
- Clade: Gymnosperms
- Division: Pinophyta
- Class: Pinopsida
- Order: Pinales
- Family: Pinaceae
- Genus: Pinus
- Subgenus: P. subg. Strobus
- Section: P. sect. Parrya
- Subsection: P. subsect. Cembroides
- Species: P. pinceana

Binomial name
- Pinus pinceana Gord.
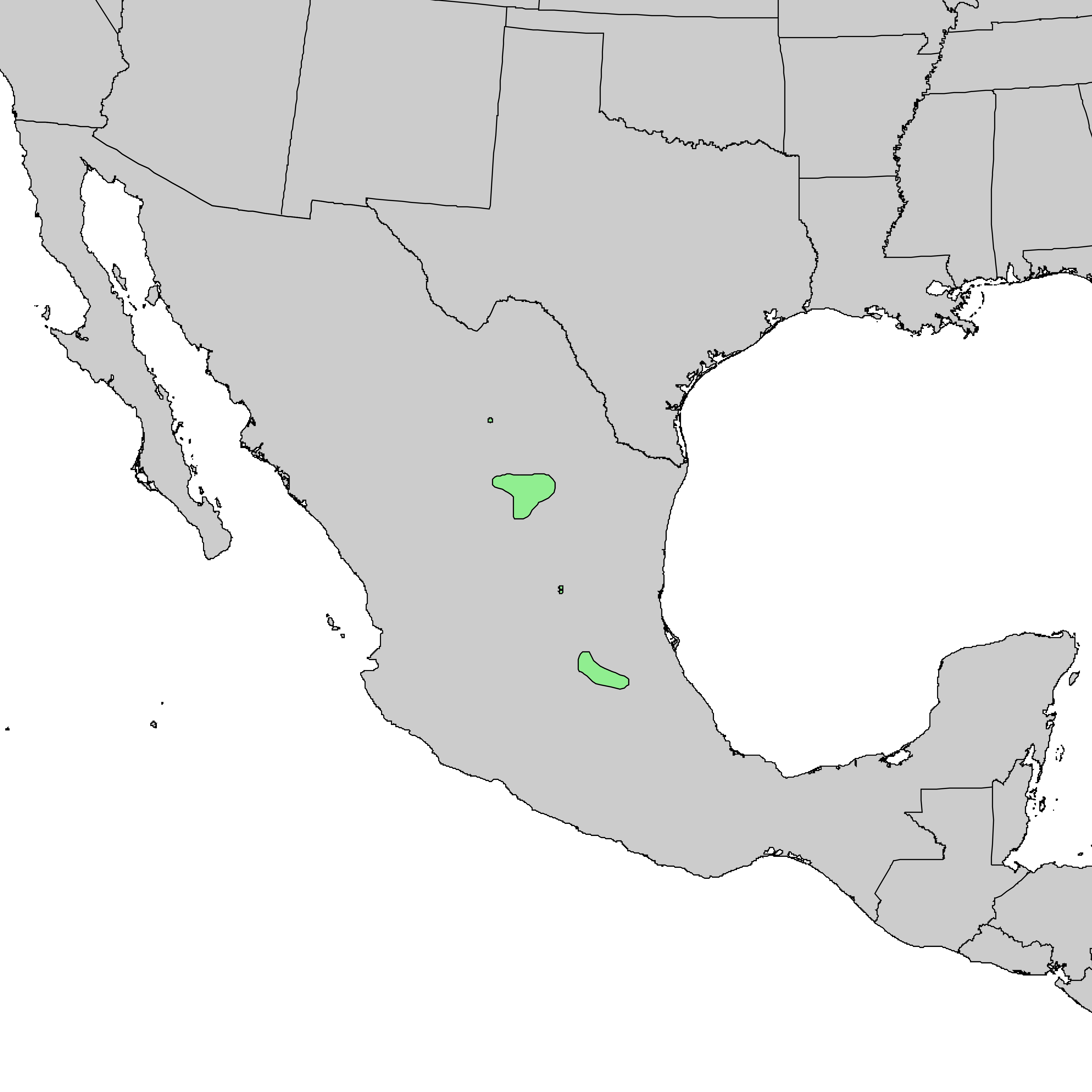
- Natural range of Pinus pinceana

= Pinus pinceana =

Species of conifer

Pinus pinceana, with the common names weeping pinyon and Pince's pinyon pine, is a species of conifer in the family Pinaceae.

== Distribution ==
This pine species is endemic to Mexico, in the states of: Durango; northern Coahuila, Nuevo León, and Zacatecas; central San Luis Potosí; and southern Querétaro and Hidalgo.

Its distribution extends over a distance of more than 750 kilometres (470 mi) from north to south.

The majority of its range it is found at altitudes between 1,100–2,600 metres (3,600–8,500 ft) in elevation, within arid areas.

== Description ==
Pinus pinceana forms a small tree or large shrub. Seeds are edible but produced infrequently.

It is an IUCN Red List Near threatened species, endangered by habitat loss.

The species is also listed as endangered in the Norma Oficial Mexicana.
