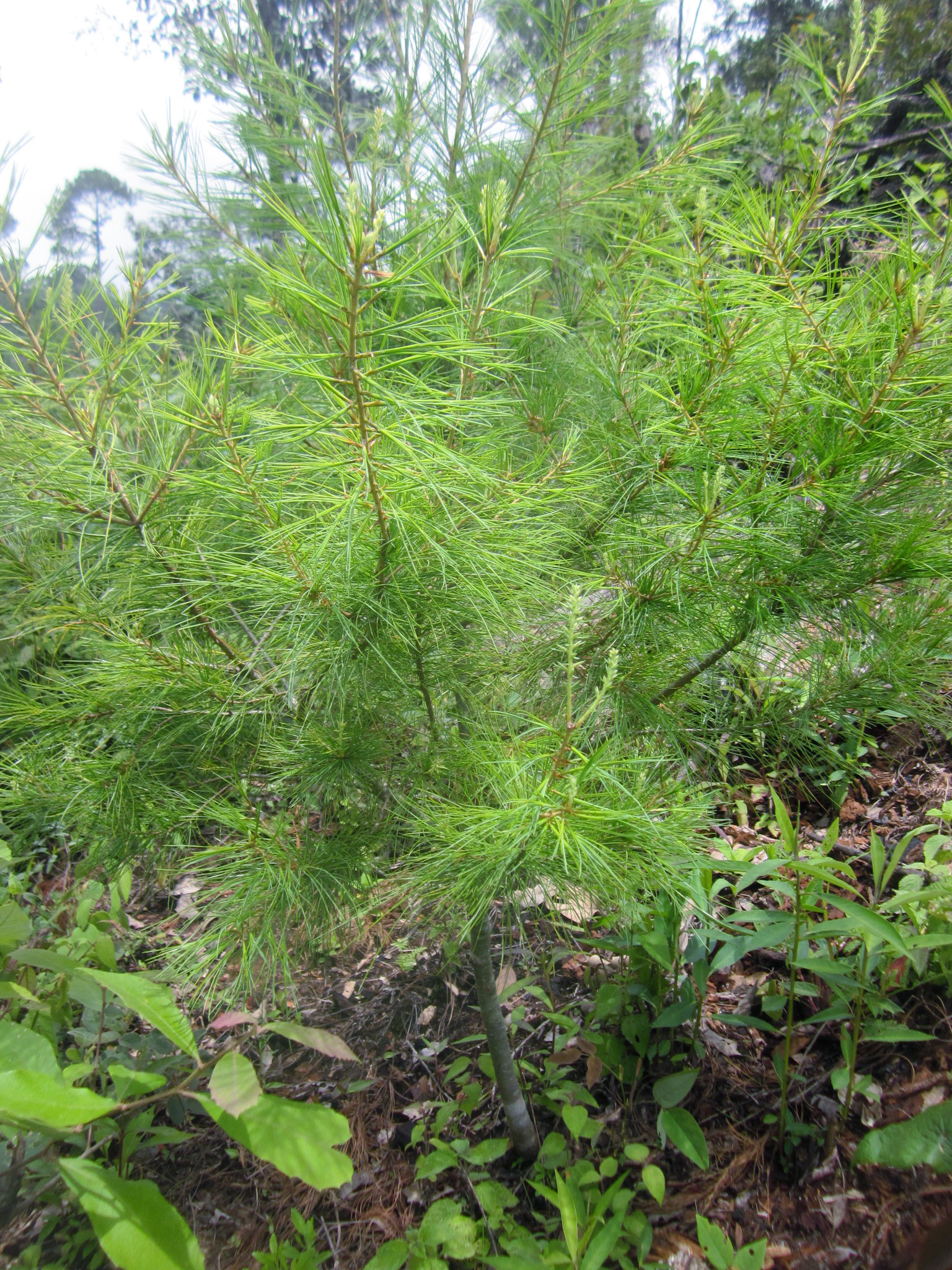

Conservation status
- Endangered (IUCN 3.1)

Scientific classification
- Kingdom: Plantae
- Clade: Tracheophytes
- Clade: Gymnospermae
- Division: Pinophyta
- Class: Pinopsida
- Order: Pinales
- Family: Pinaceae
- Genus: Pinus
- Subgenus: P. subg. Strobus
- Section: P. sect. Quinquefoliae
- Subsection: P. subsect. Strobus
- Species: P. chiapensis

Binomial name
- Pinus chiapensis (Martínez) Andresen
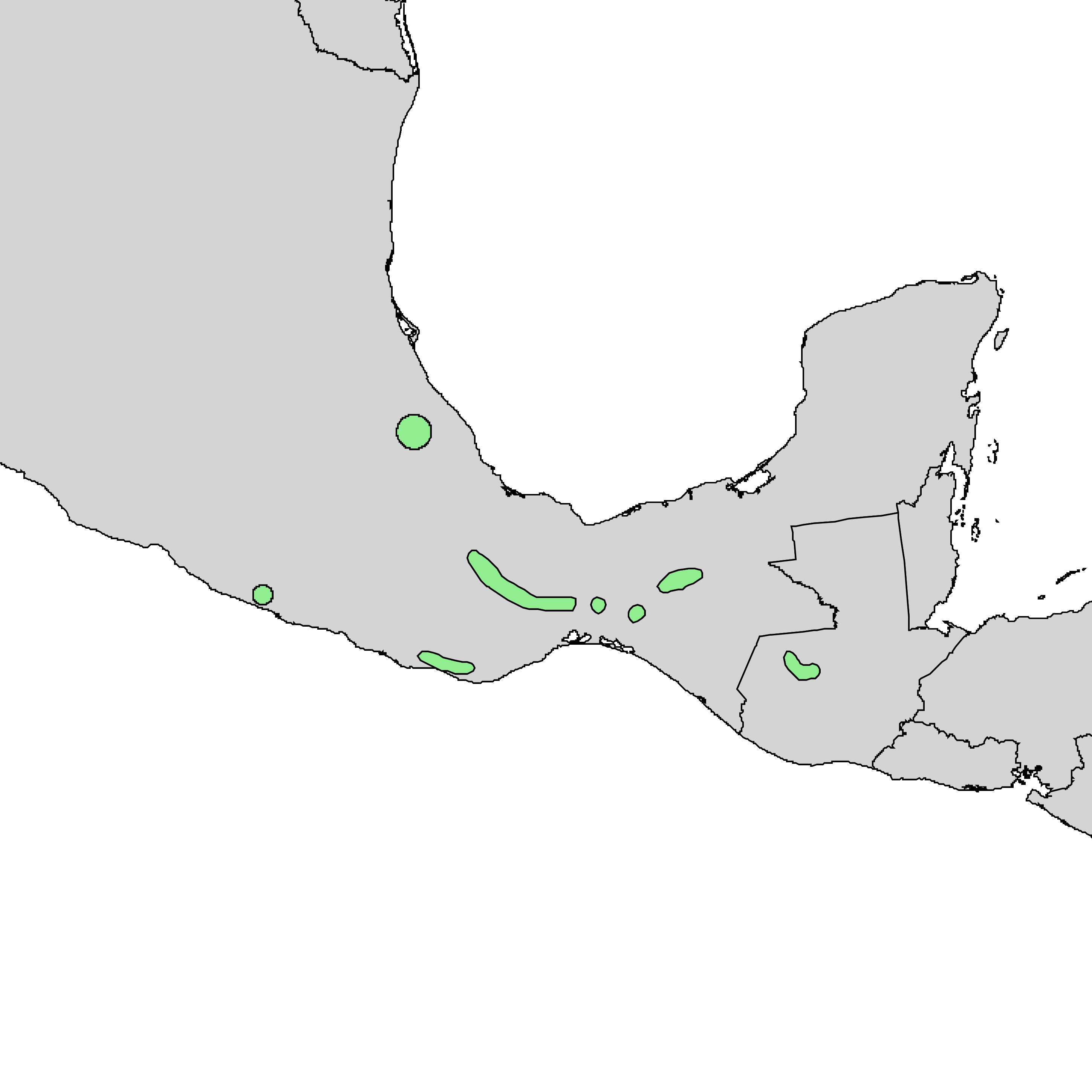
- Natural range of Pinus chiapensis

Synonyms
- Pinus strobus var. chiapensis

= Pinus chiapensis =

Species of conifer

Pinus chiapensis is a pine tree species in the family Pinaceae, and is commonly known as Chiapas pine, in Spanish as pino blanco, pinabete, or ocote. Chiapas pine was formerly considered to be a variant of Pinus strobus, but is now understood to be a separate species.

== Distribution ==
The tree is native to southern Mexico and Guatemala, where it is found from 600–2,200 metres (2,000–7,200 ft). It is found in Central American pine-oak forests habitats, including in the Sierra Madre de Chiapas.

Pinus chiapensis can grow to a height of 30–35 metres (98–115 ft).

Introduced

It is an introduced species in Colombia, Brazil, South Africa, and Queensland in Australia.

== See also ==
- Mesoamerican pine-oak forests
