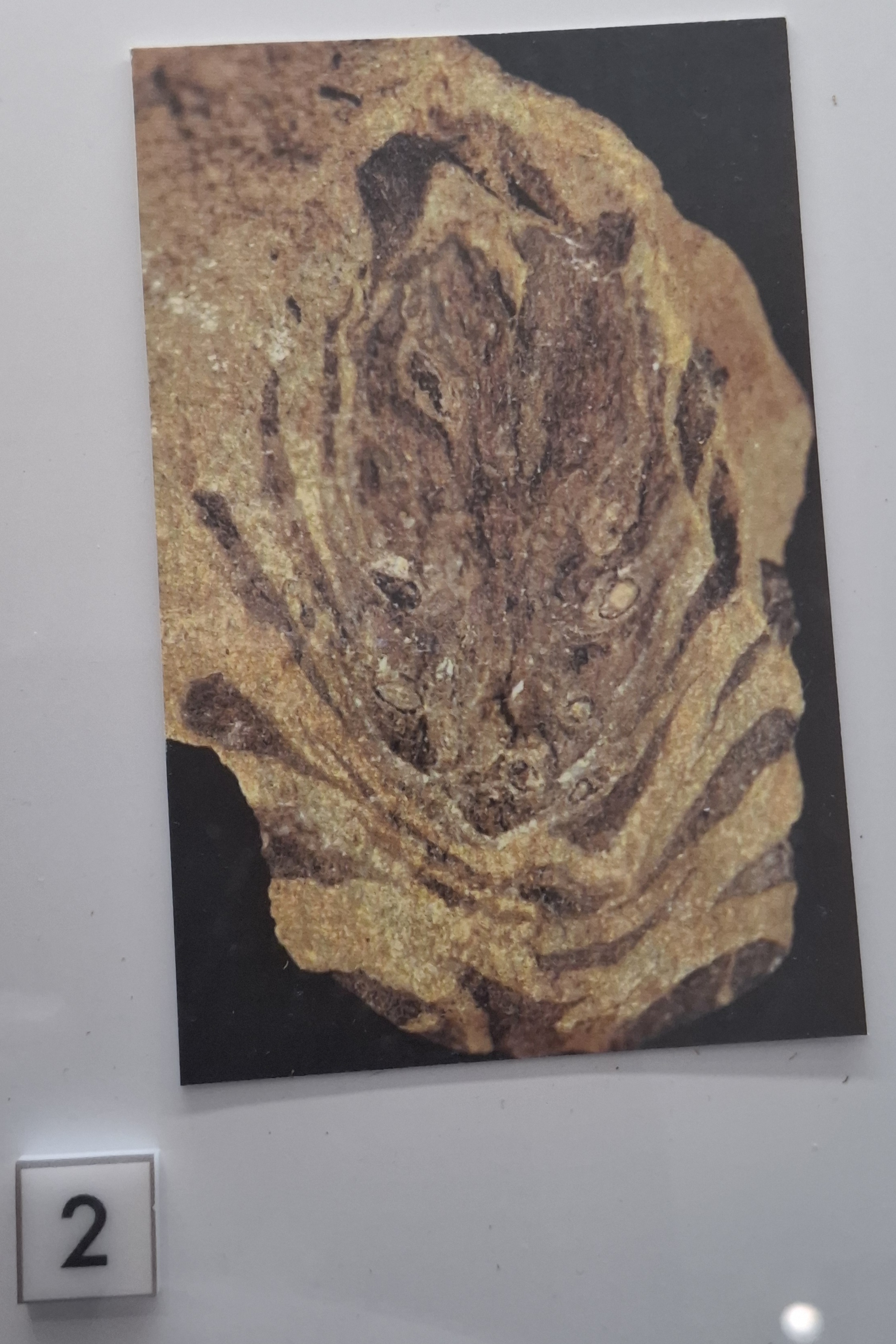
- The holotype before thin sectioning

Scientific classification
- Kingdom: Plantae
- Clade: Tracheophytes
- Clade: Gymnosperms
- Division: Pinophyta
- Class: Pinopsida
- Order: Pinales
- Family: Pinaceae
- Genus: Pinus
- Subgenus: P. subg. Pinus
- Species: †P. yorkshirensis

Binomial name
- †Pinus yorkshirensis Ryberg et al., 2012

= Pinus yorkshirensis =

Pinus yorkshirensis Temporal range: Early Cretaceous, 131–129 Ma

Extinct species of conifer

Pinus yorkshirensis is an extinct species of pine tree, a conifer in the family Pinaceae. The fossil pine cone came from Hauterivian and Barremian-aged sedimentary rocks located in the Speeton Clay Formation in Yorkshire (hence the species epithet).

== Discovery and naming ==
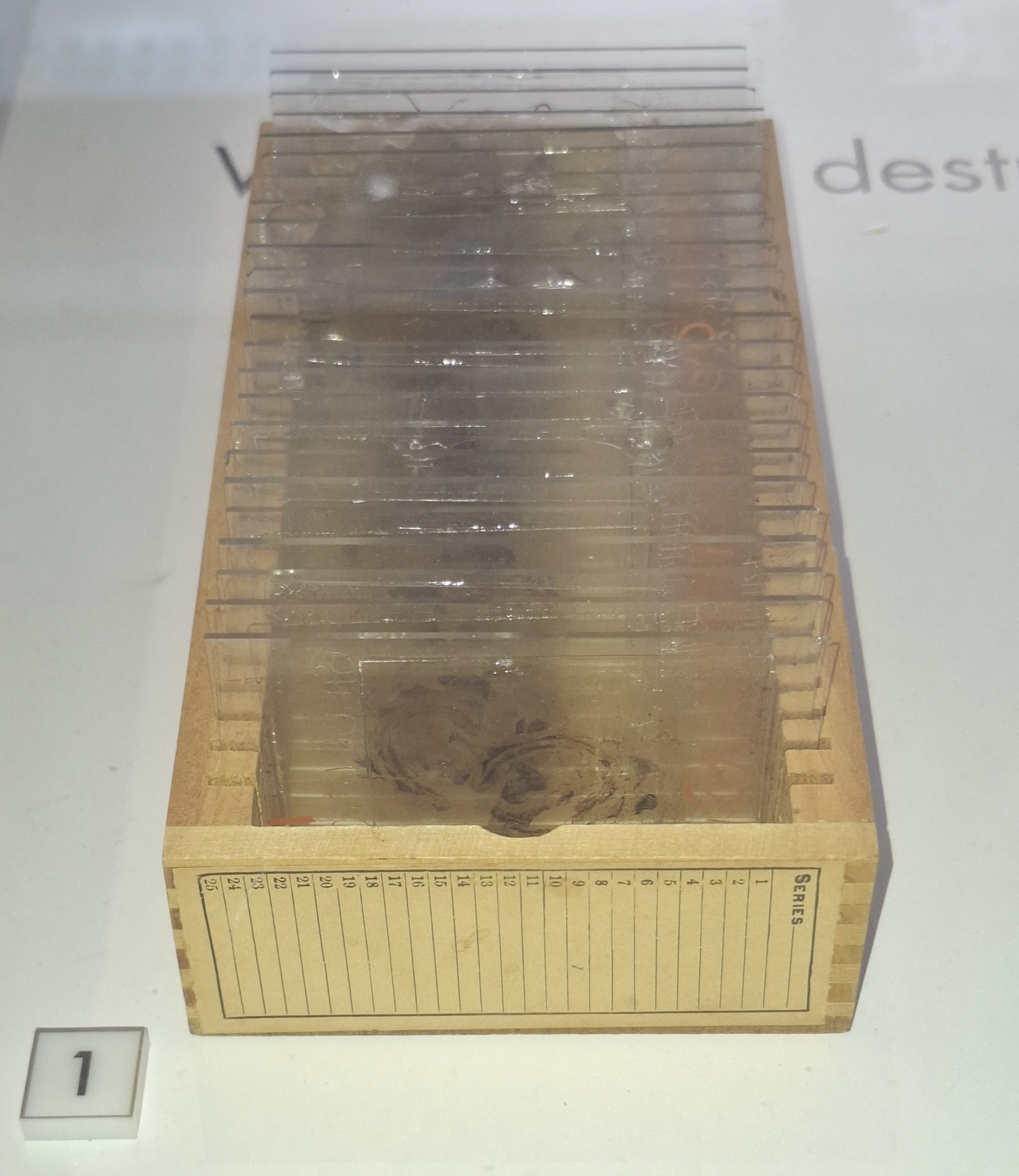
Microscope slides of the holotype

The type specimen of Pinus yorkshirensis, BiRUG BU4737, was discovered during a field trip with the University of Birmingham to the Speeton Clay Formation. It is one of four known fossil pine cones from Europe and it was found within a weathered concretion that had split into seven fragments. It was 5 million years older than the previous record holder, Pinus belgica.

The fossil was sectioned and mounted in a series of microscope slides to facilitate cellular study of the fossil in more detail. All that remains are a few microscope slides and a single image. They are currently housed at Lapworth Museum of Geology.

Pinus yorkshirensis was named and described by Ryberg et al. (2012).

== Description ==
The preserved cones of P. yorkshirensis are conical in shape.
