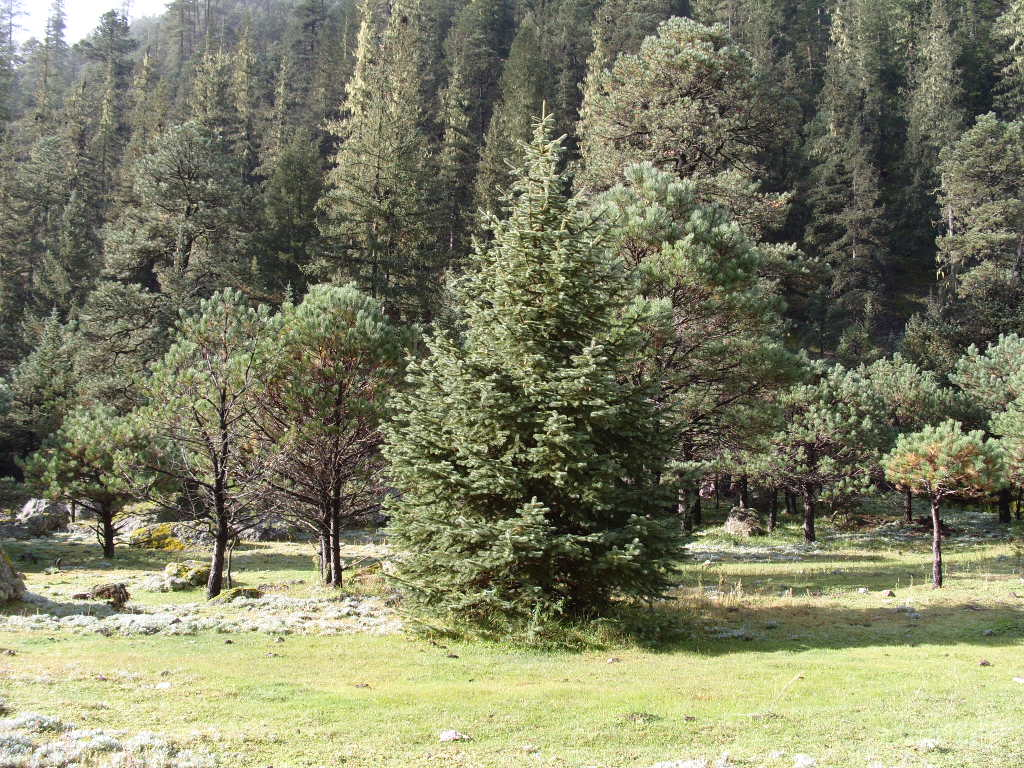
- Mixed forest of Pinus cooperi and Picea chihuahuana

Scientific classification
- Kingdom: Plantae
- Clade: Tracheophytes
- Clade: Gymnospermae
- Division: Pinophyta
- Class: Pinopsida
- Order: Pinales
- Family: Pinaceae
- Genus: Pinus
- Subgenus: P. subg. Pinus
- Section: P. sect. Trifoliae
- Subsection: P. subsect. Ponderosae
- Species: P. cooperi

Binomial name
- Pinus cooperi Blanco
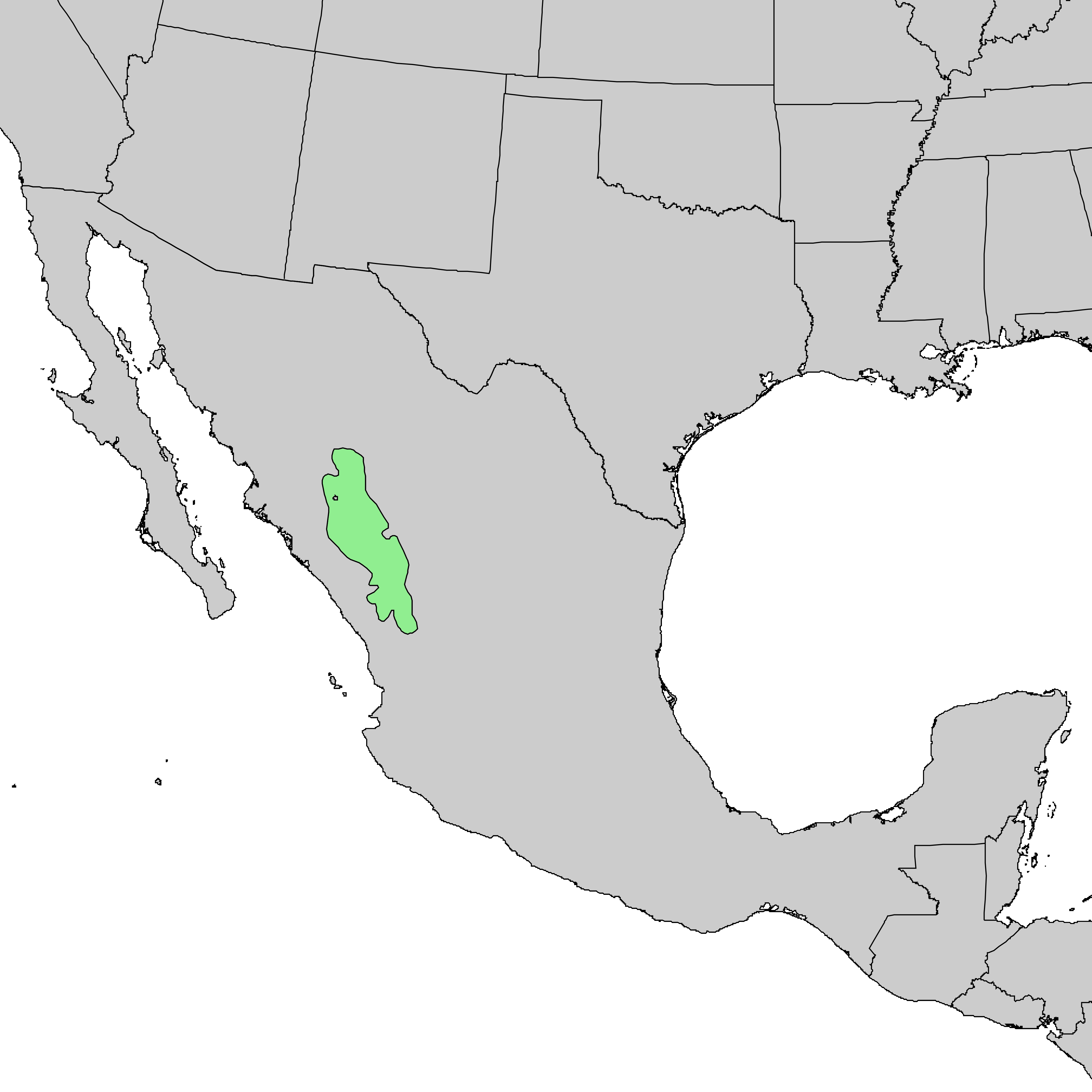
- Natural range of Pinus cooperi

= Pinus cooperi =

Species of conifer

Pinus cooperi, sometimes called Cooper's pine or Cooper pine, is a medium-sized pine which is endemic to Mexico.
