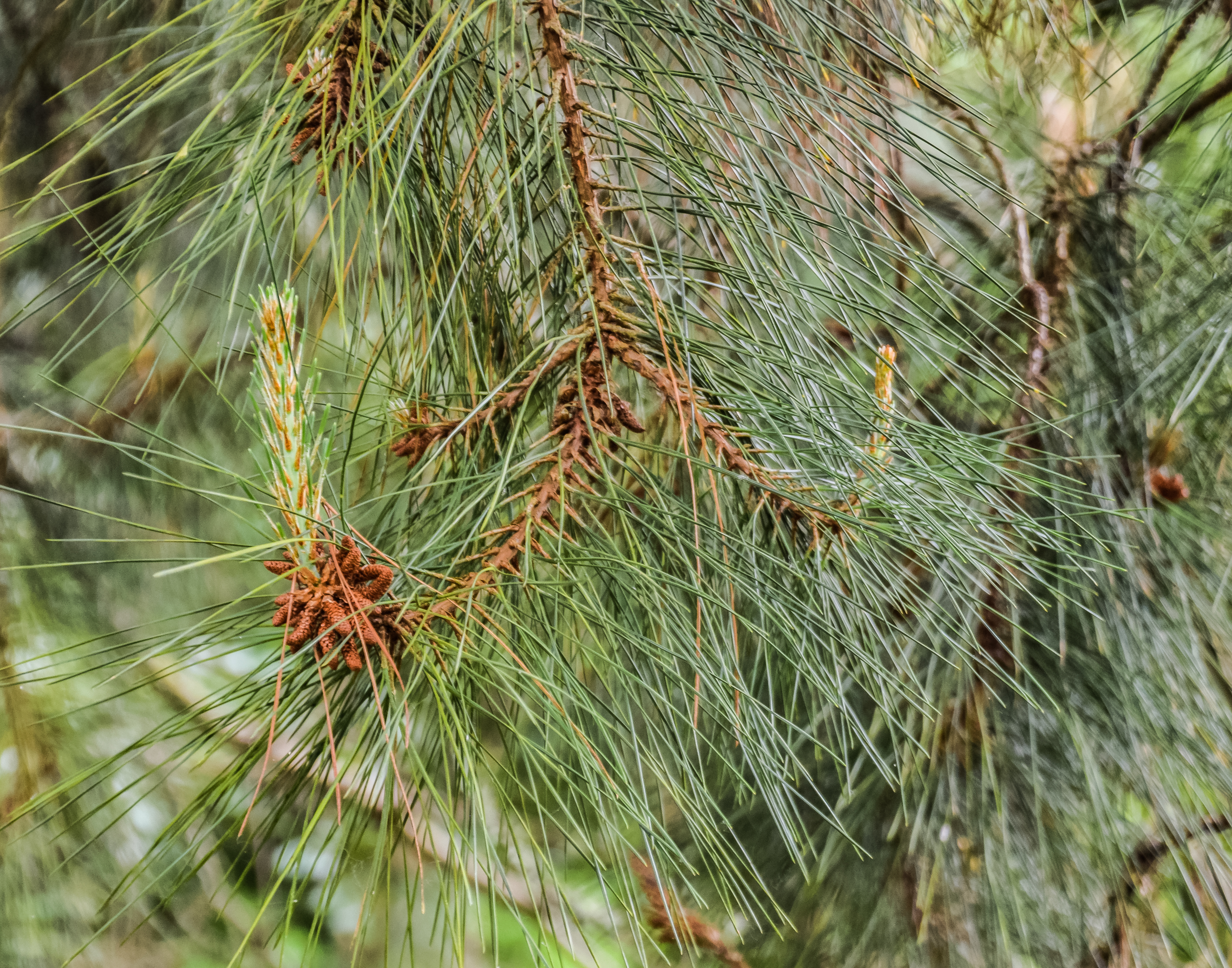

Conservation status
- Least Concern (IUCN 3.1)

Scientific classification
- Kingdom: Plantae
- Clade: Tracheophytes
- Clade: Gymnosperms
- Division: Pinophyta
- Class: Pinopsida
- Order: Pinales
- Family: Pinaceae
- Genus: Pinus
- Subgenus: P. subg. Pinus
- Section: P. sect. Trifoliae
- Subsection: P. subsect. Australes
- Species: P. lawsonii

Binomial name
- Pinus lawsonii Roezl ex Gordon
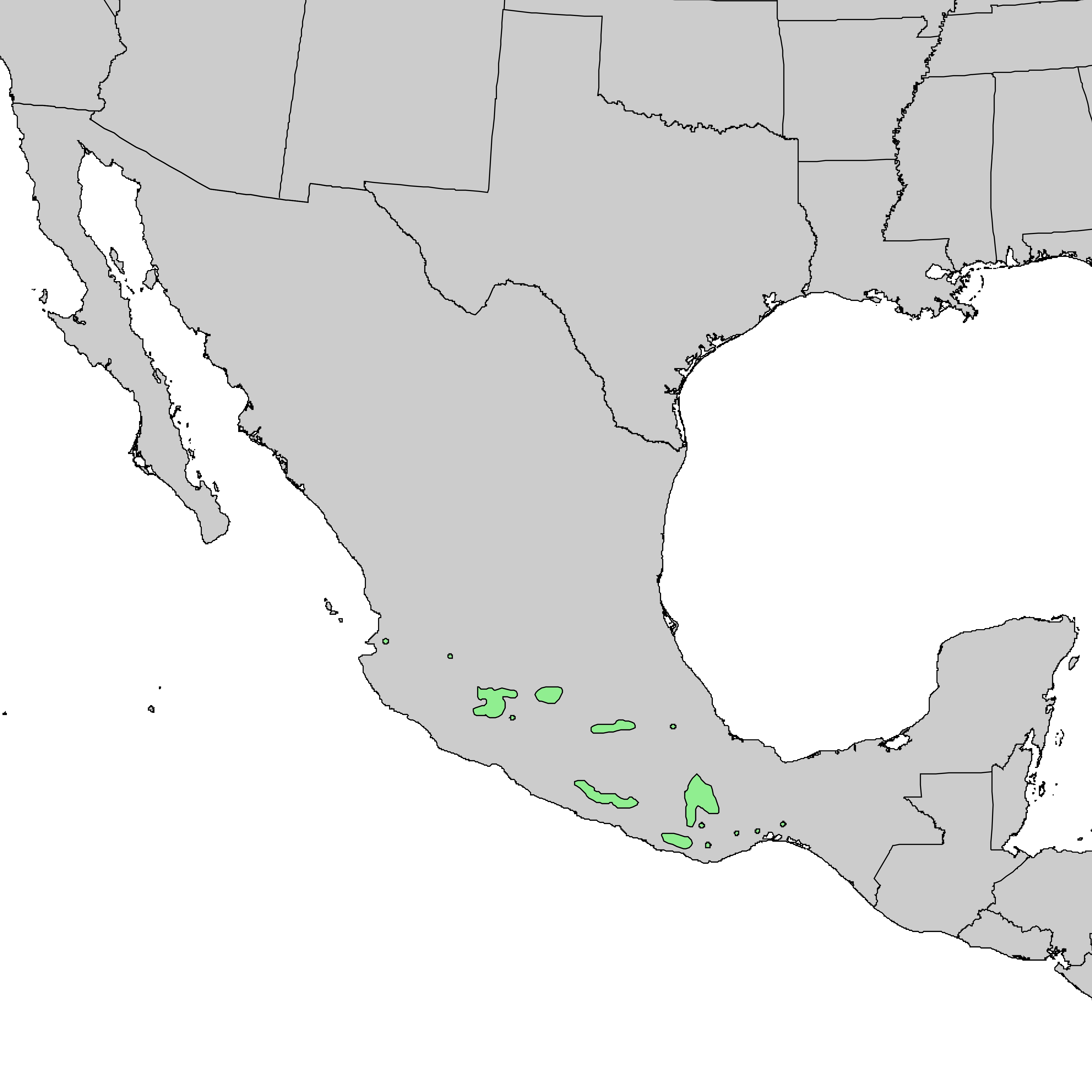
- Natural range of Pinus lawsonii

= Pinus lawsonii =

Species of conifer

Pinus lawsonii, Lawson's pine, is a species of conifer in the family Pinaceae. It is a pine endemic to Mexico.
