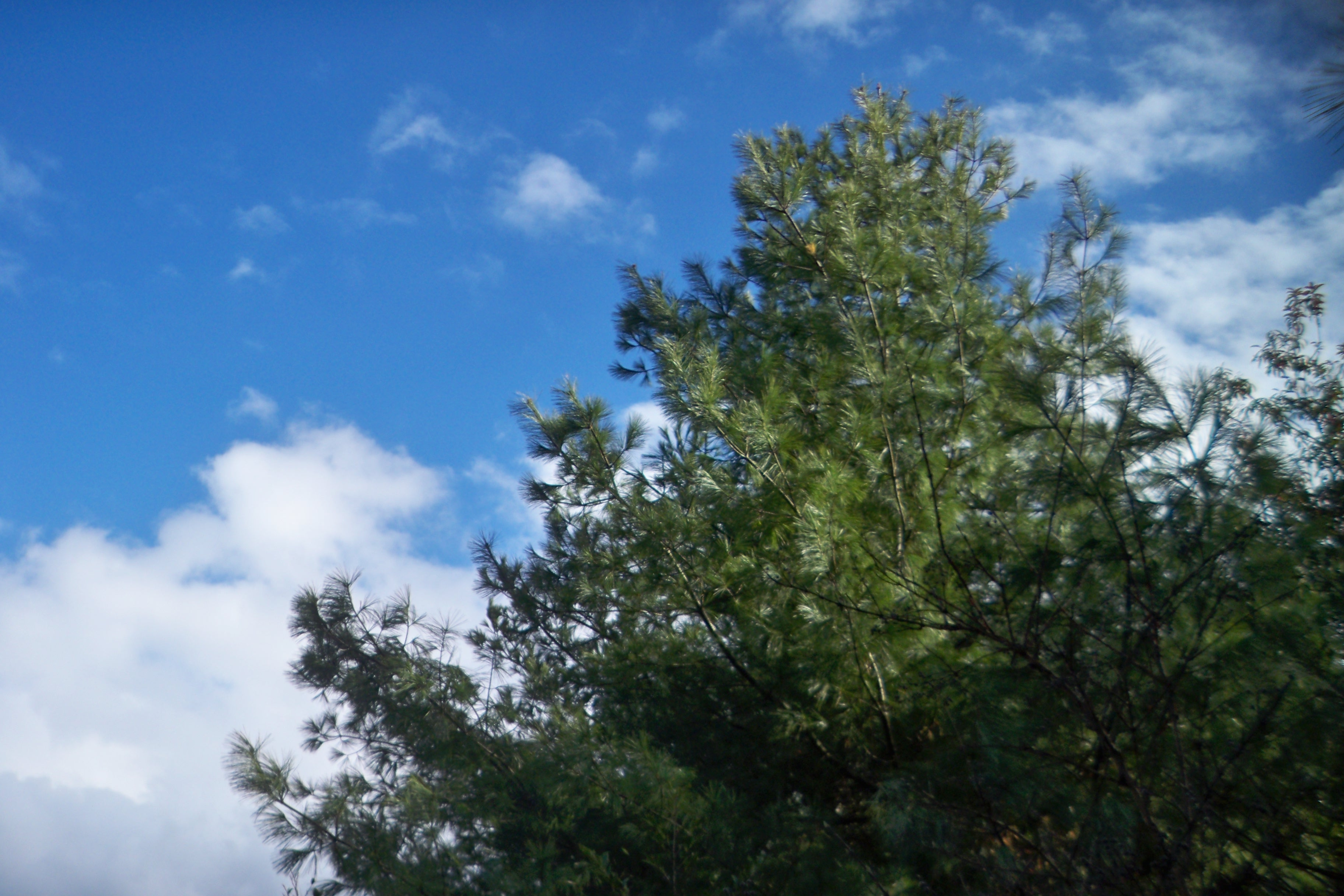

Conservation status
- Near Threatened (IUCN 3.1)

Scientific classification
- Kingdom: Plantae
- Clade: Tracheophytes
- Clade: Gymnospermae
- Division: Pinophyta
- Class: Pinopsida
- Order: Pinales
- Family: Pinaceae
- Genus: Pinus
- Subgenus: P. subg. Strobus
- Section: P. sect. Quinquefoliae
- Subsection: P. subsect. Strobus
- Species: P. morrisonicola

Binomial name
- Pinus morrisonicola Hayata

Synonyms
- Pinus formosana Hayata; Pinus hayatana Businský; Pinus uyematsui Hayata

= Pinus morrisonicola =

Species of conifer

Pinus morrisonicola (Taiwan white pine; Chinese: 台灣五葉松; pinyin: taiwan wuyesong; lit. 'Taiwan five-leave pine'), is a species of conifer in the family Pinaceae. It is a large tree, up to 15–25 m (50–80 ft) high and 1.2 m (4 ft) in diameter. The trunk is often crooked. Needles are in bundles of five. Mature cones are large, to 10 cm (4 in) long and 4–5 cm (1.6–2.0 in) wide.

== Distribution ==
Pinus morrisonicola is endemic to Taiwan. It grows at altitudes of 300–2,300 m (980–7,550 ft) throughout the island. At present, it is scarce at lower elevations and mostly present at higher elevations and less accessible places.

== Uses ==
Compared with the similar-looking black pine (Pinus thunbergii), Taiwan white pine's needles are slenderer and more delicate. When the new leaves sprout, the green color in different shades is stunningly beautiful. Because of these features, the plant plays an important role in garden landscaping and bonsai production. The quality wood can be used as building materials, furniture and paper making. The leaves can also be juiced as a drink or used as medicine and the fruits can be refined into aromatic essential oils.

== Gallery ==
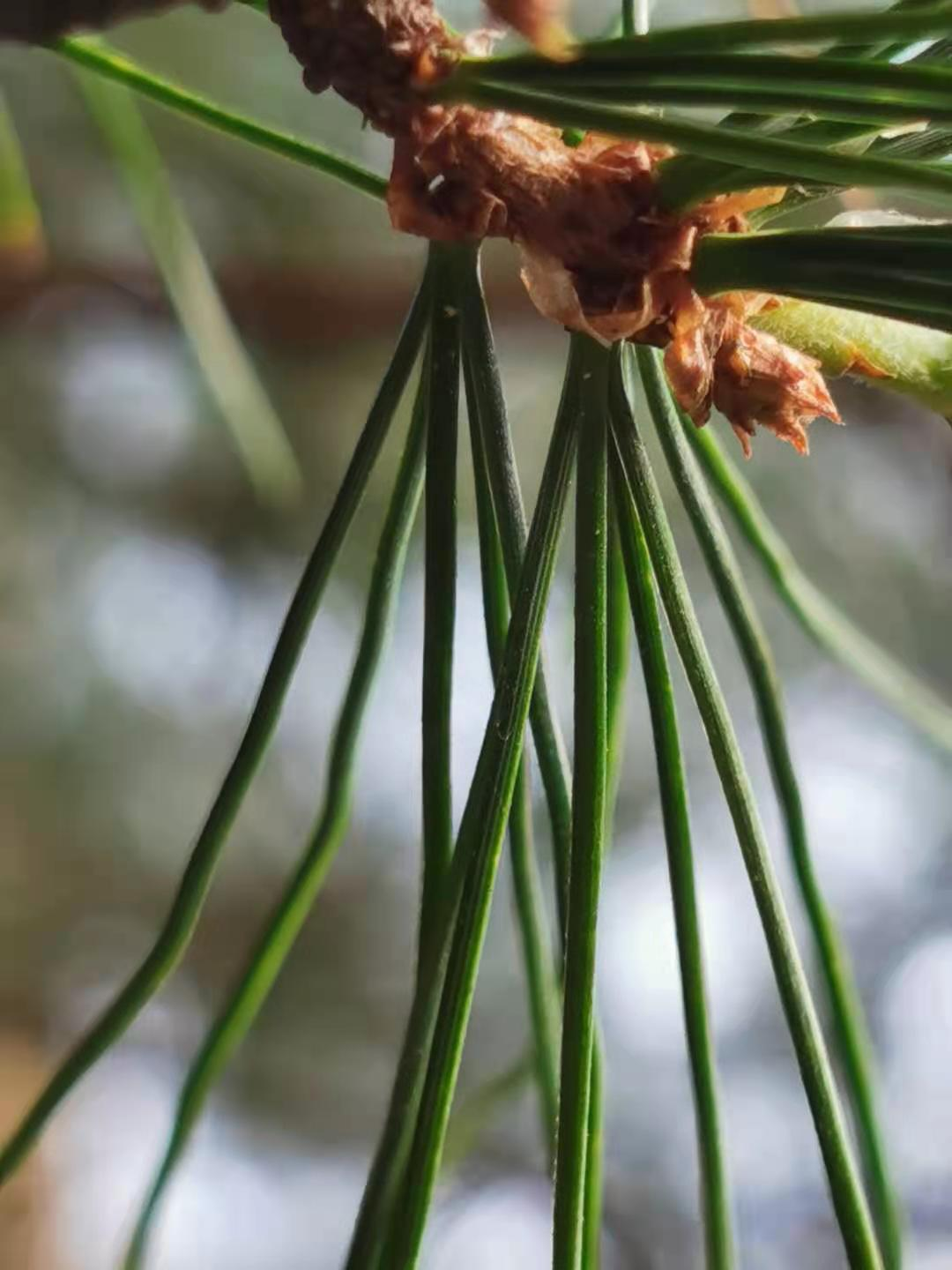

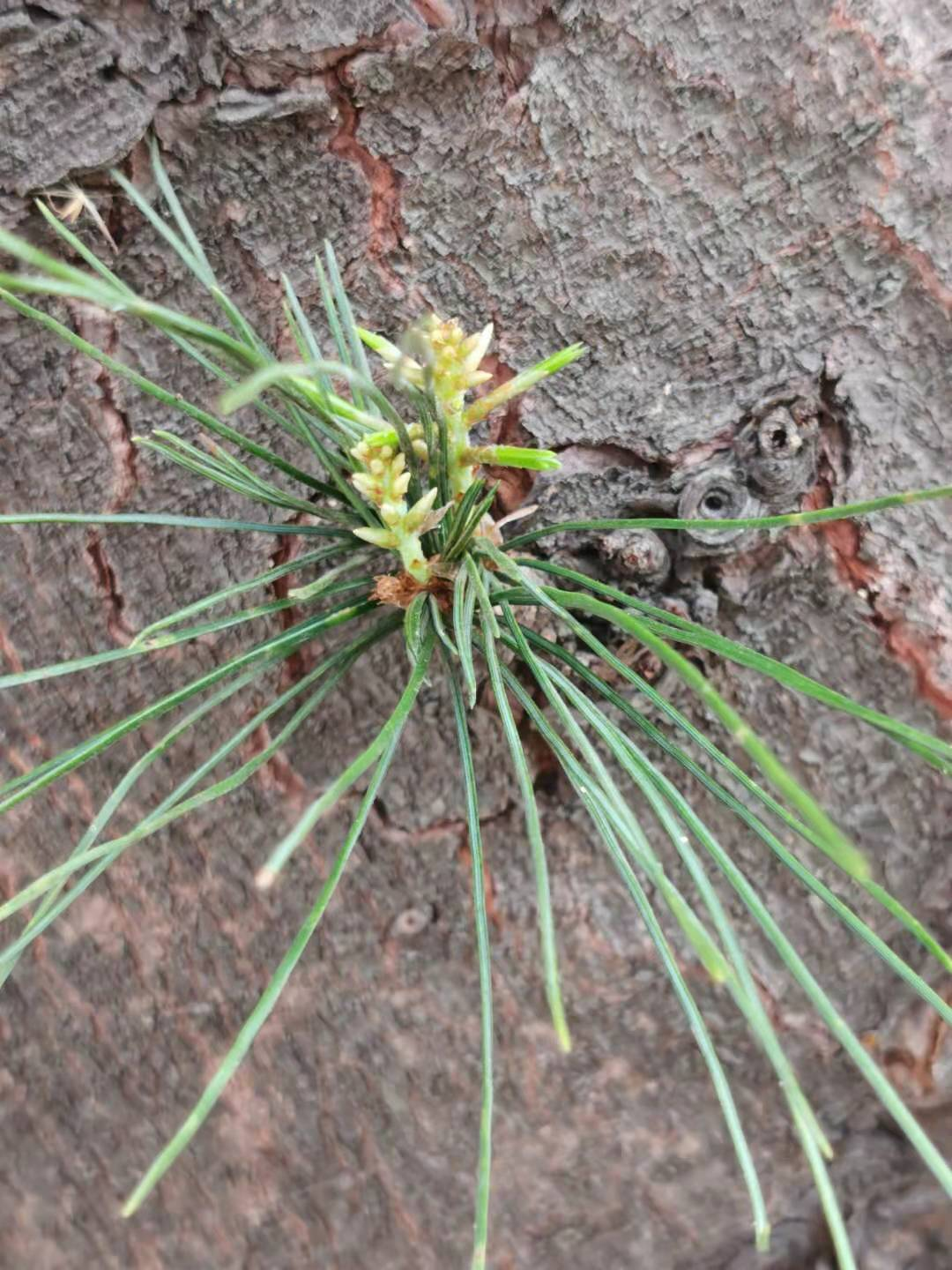

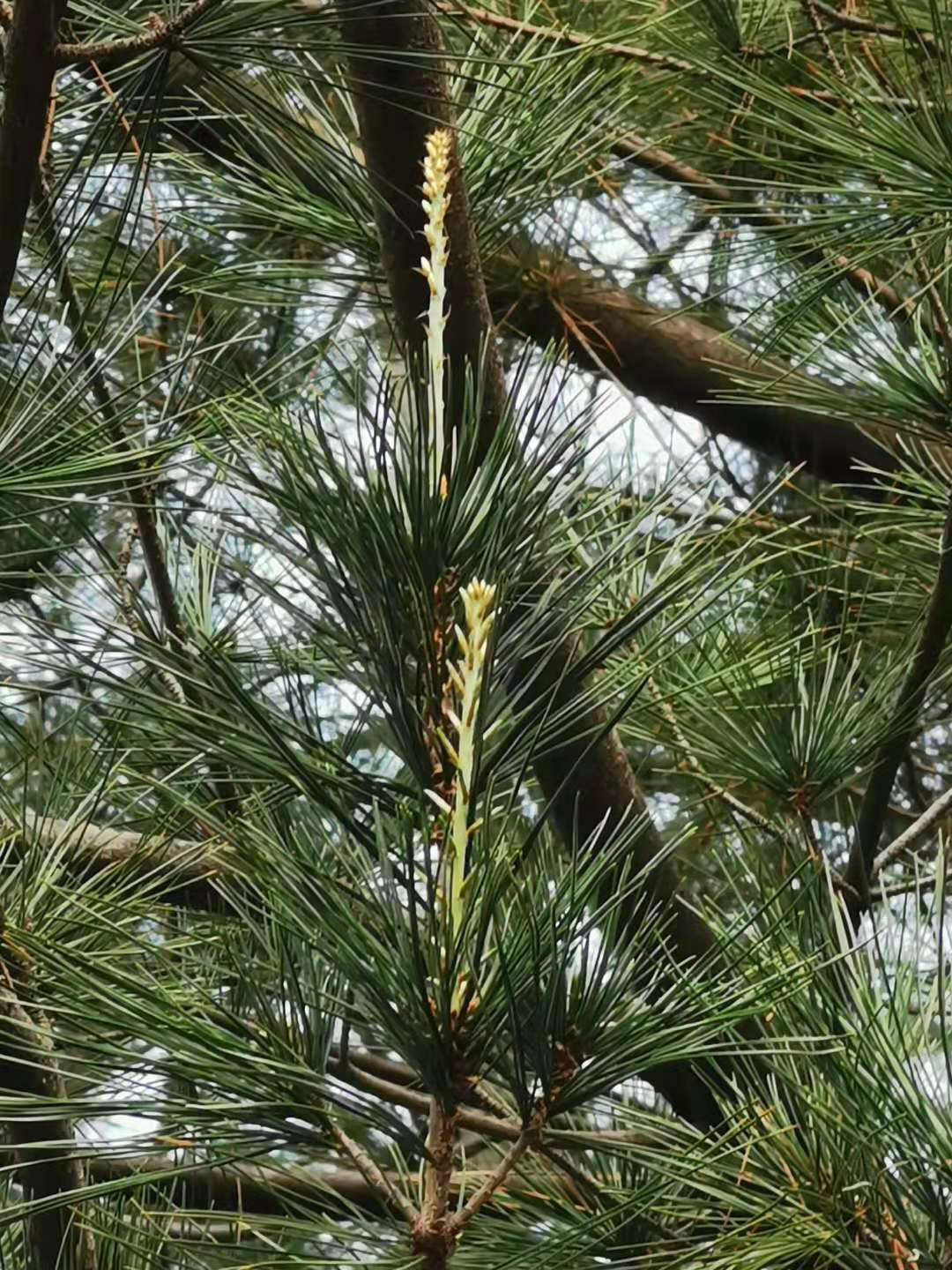

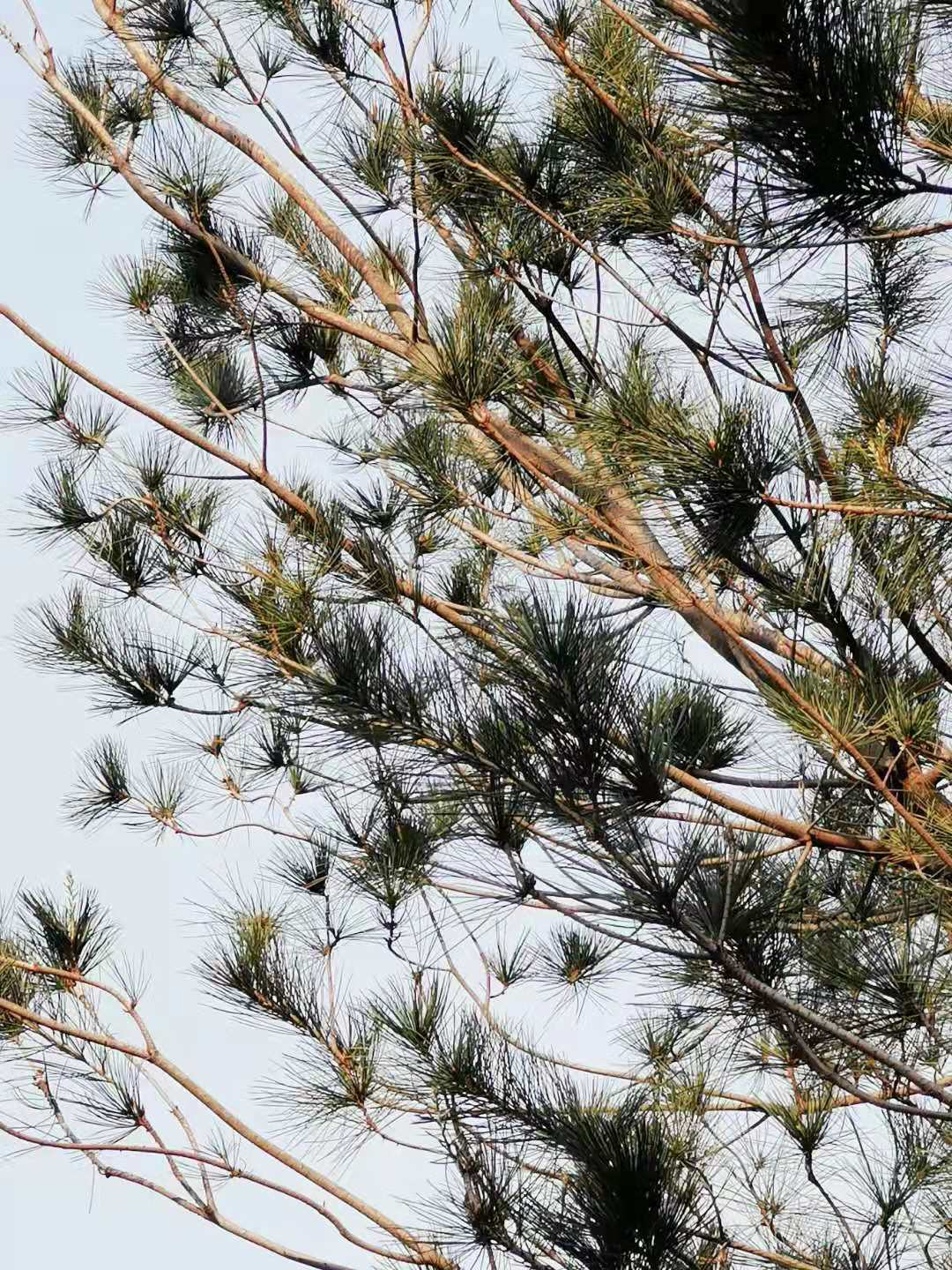
