= Pinus praetermissa =

Conservation status
- Near Threatened (IUCN 3.1)

Scientific classification
- Kingdom: Plantae
- Clade: Tracheophytes
- Clade: Gymnosperms
- Division: Pinophyta
- Class: Pinopsida
- Order: Pinales
- Family: Pinaceae
- Genus: Pinus
- Subgenus: P. subg. Pinus
- Section: P. sect. Trifoliae
- Subsection: P. subsect. Australes
- Species: P. praetermissa

Binomial name
- Pinus praetermissa Styles & McVaugh

Synonyms
- Pinus oocarpa var. microphylla Shaw

Species of conifer

Pinus praetermissa, commonly known as McVaugh's pine, is a species of conifer in the family Pinaceae. Originally classified as a variety of Pinus oocarpa (P. oocarpa var. microphylla) in 1909, it was promoted to specific status in 1990 after further study.

It is a pine tree endemic to western Mexico.
