= Pinus amamiana =

- Pinus amamiana trees on Yakushima island, Japan

Conservation status
- Endangered (IUCN 3.1)

Scientific classification
- Kingdom: Plantae
- Clade: Tracheophytes
- Clade: Gymnosperms
- Division: Pinophyta
- Class: Pinopsida
- Order: Pinales
- Family: Pinaceae
- Genus: Pinus
- Subgenus: P. subg. Strobus
- Section: P. sect. Quinquefoliae
- Subsection: P. subsect. Strobus
- Species: P. amamiana

Binomial name
- Pinus amamiana Koidz.

Species of conifer

Pinus amamiana (Amami pine, Yakushima white pine) is a species of pine. It is a native of southern Japan, on the islands of Yakushima and Tanegashima south of Kyūshū. It has also been grown horticulturally in Japanese parks. This pine can grow to a height of 25 m with a trunk diameter of up to 1 m.

The needles grow in bundles of five and the cones are 5–8 cm in length.

This tree is known in Japanese as amami-goyōmatsu, amami-goyō, and yakutane-goyō.
