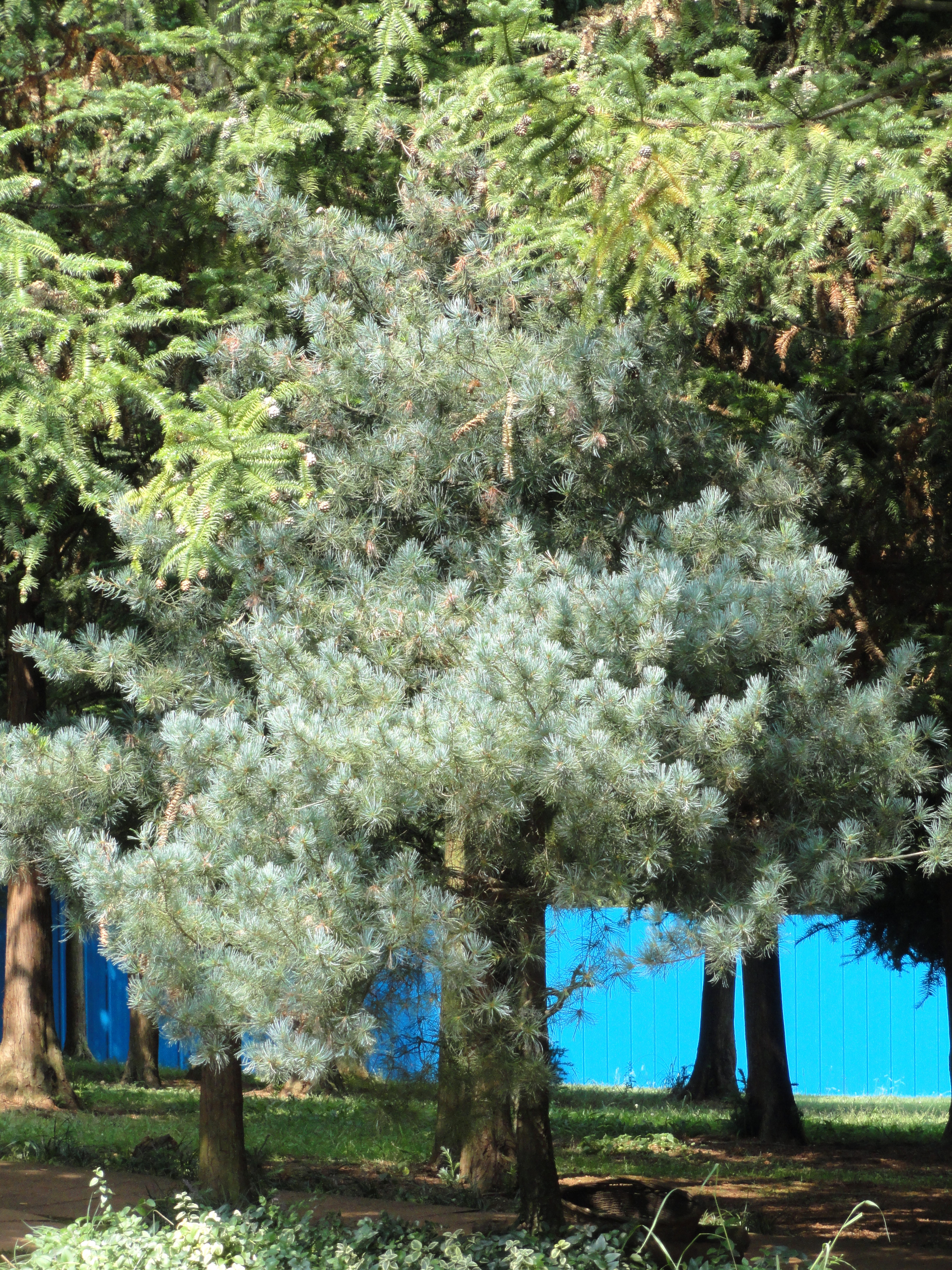
- In Kunming Botanical Garden

Conservation status
- Endangered (IUCN 3.1)

Scientific classification
- Kingdom: Plantae
- Clade: Tracheophytes
- Clade: Gymnosperms
- Division: Pinophyta
- Class: Pinopsida
- Order: Pinales
- Family: Pinaceae
- Genus: Pinus
- Subgenus: P. subg. Strobus
- Section: P. sect. Quinquefoliae
- Subsection: P. subsect. Strobus
- Species: P. wangii

Binomial name
- Pinus wangii Hu & Cheng

= Pinus wangii =

Species of conifer

Pinus wangii, the Guangdong white pine (Chinese: 毛枝五针松), is a species of conifer in the family Pinaceae. It was named after Dr. Shao-Ping Wang, a professor of forest genetics.

== Distribution ==
This pine tree is native to Yunnan Province of southern China, where two populations are known from Wenshan Prefecture. It is uncertain whether it occurs in northern Vietnam.

Pinus wangii is an endangered species on the IUCN Red List, threatened by continued logging. It is under second-class national protection in China.
