= Pinus ustulata =

Scientific classification
- Kingdom: Plantae
- Clade: Tracheophytes
- Clade: Gymnosperms
- Division: Pinophyta
- Class: Pinopsida
- Order: Pinales
- Family: Pinaceae
- Genus: Pinus
- Species: P. ustulata

Binomial name
- Pinus ustulata (Businský) Businský

Species of conifer

Pinus ustulata, the Philippine pine, is a tropical species of conifer in the family Pinaceae, a pine native to Luzon and Mindoro in the Philippines, which was split from the Pinus merkusii aggregate in 2014. As of August 2026, Plants of the World Online did not accept the split and regarded it as a synonym of Pinus merkusii.
