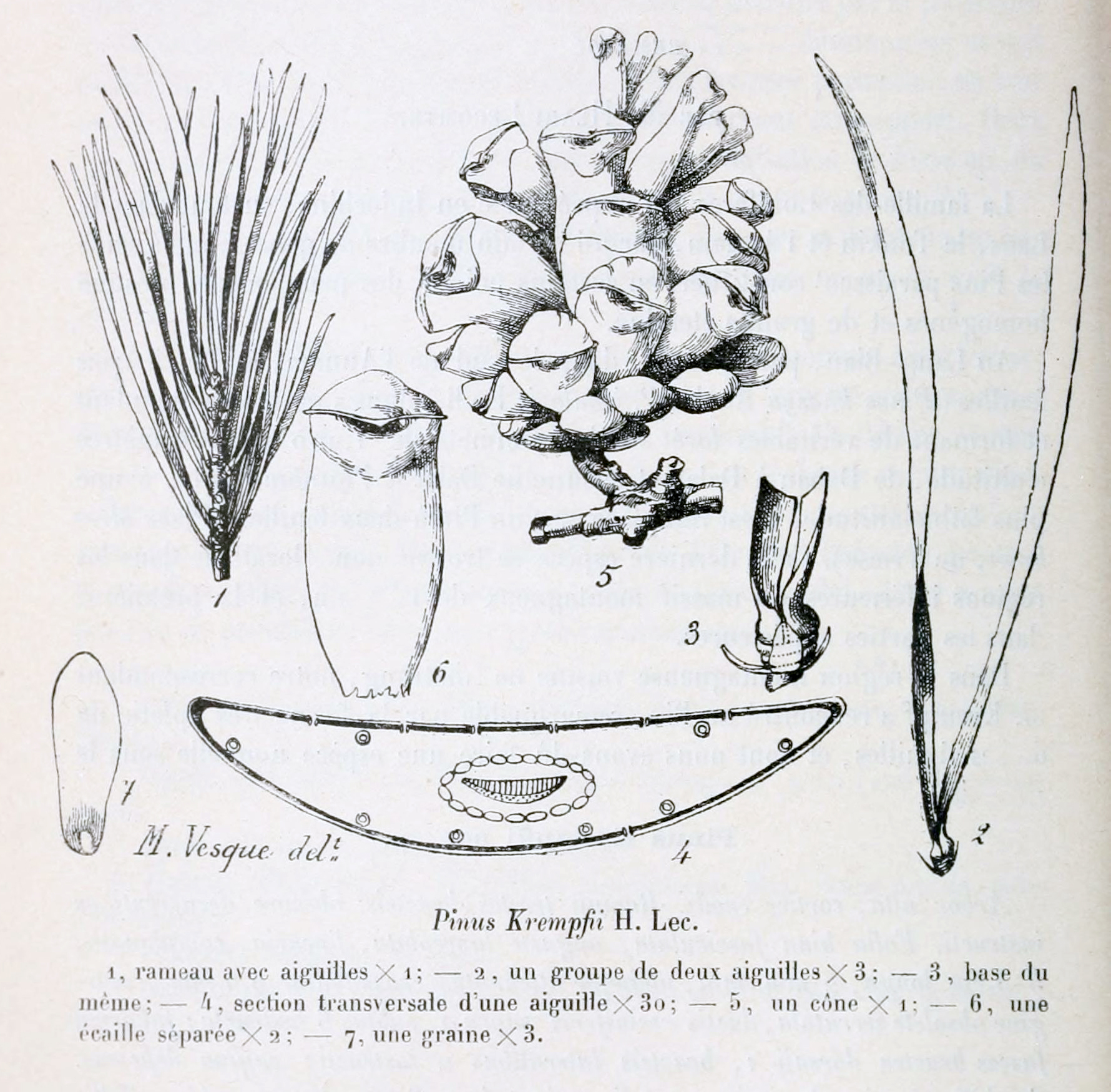

Conservation status
- Vulnerable (IUCN 3.1)

Scientific classification
- Kingdom: Plantae
- Clade: Tracheophytes
- Clade: Gymnospermae
- Division: Pinophyta
- Class: Pinopsida
- Order: Pinales
- Family: Pinaceae
- Genus: Pinus
- Subgenus: P. subg. Strobus
- Section: P. sect. Quinquefoliae
- Subsection: P. subsect. Krempfianae
- Species: P. krempfii

Binomial name
- Pinus krempfii Lecomte
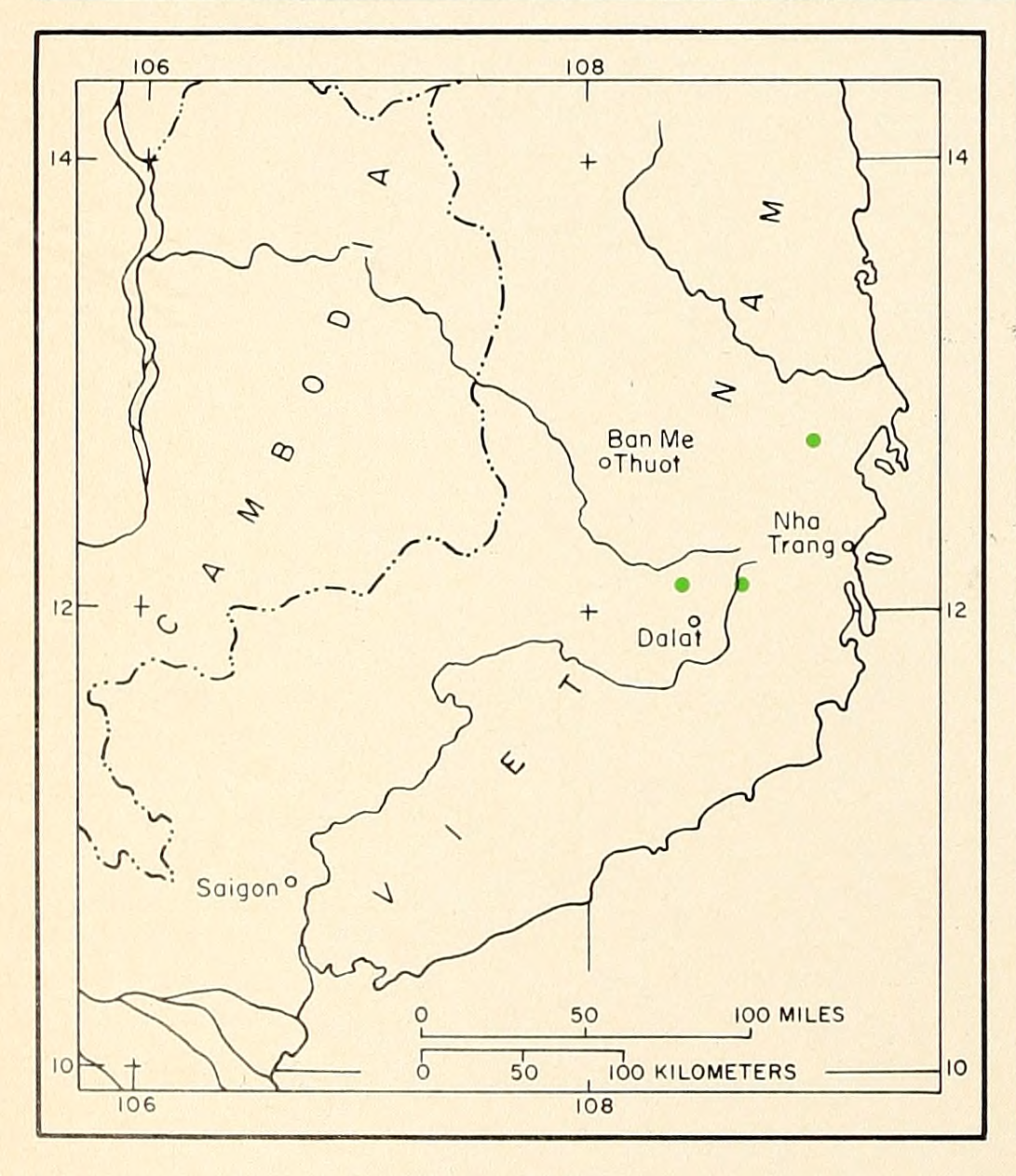
- Natural range of Pinus krempfii

= Pinus krempfii =

Species of conifer

Pinus krempfii, or Krempf's pine, is a rare species of pine, endemic to the central highlands of Vietnam in the Da Lat–Nha Trang area. It is unusual in that it has flat needles. Because of this anomaly, it is put in its own subsection, the Krempfianae. In adult trees these needles are up to 4 mm (0.16 in) wide, "but much larger on juveniles". The tree is a rainforest emergent to 55 m (180 ft) in height and up to 2 m (6 ft 7 in) DBH.
