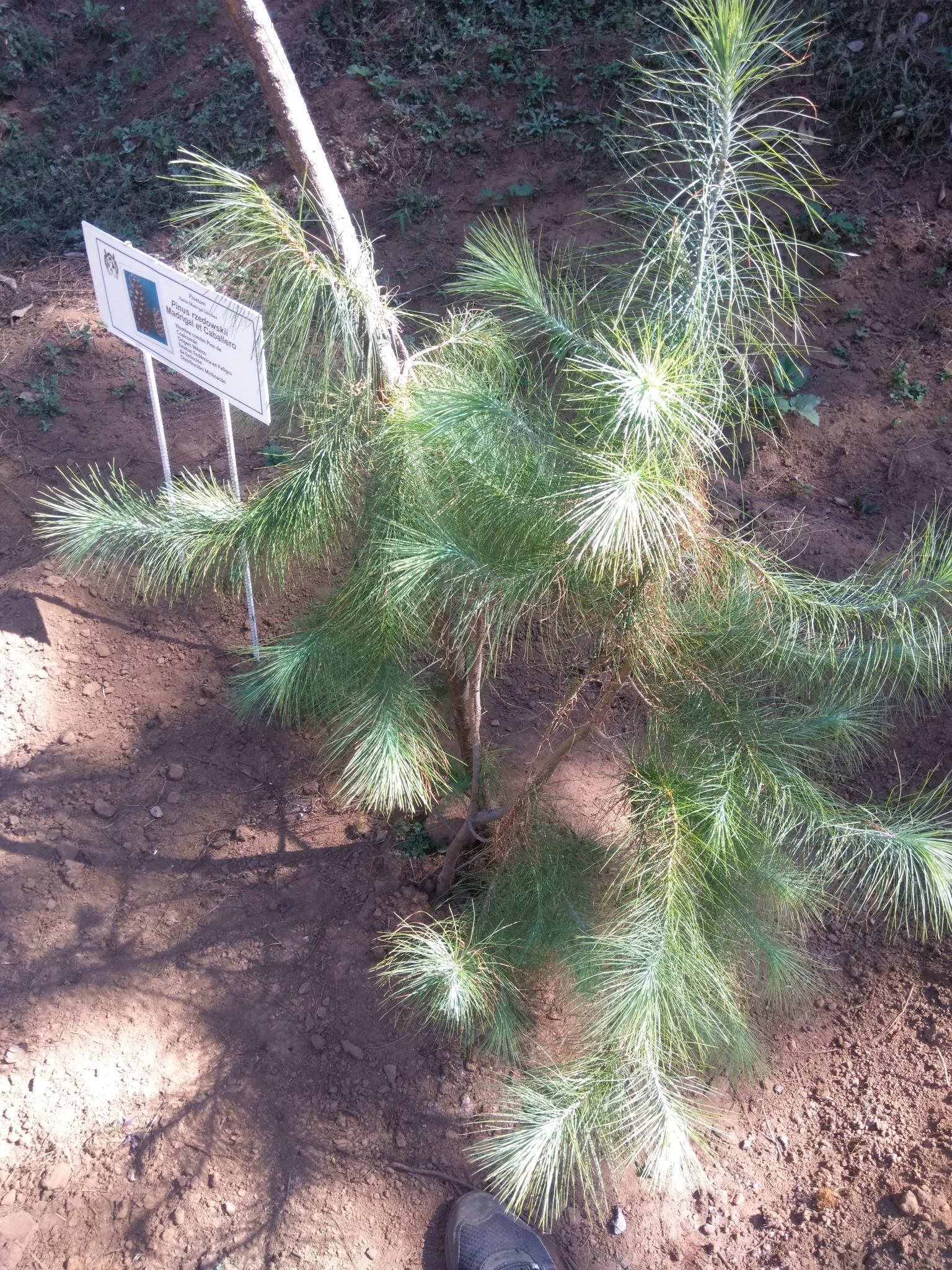

Conservation status
- Vulnerable (IUCN 3.1)

Scientific classification
- Kingdom: Plantae
- Clade: Tracheophytes
- Clade: Gymnospermae
- Division: Pinophyta
- Class: Pinopsida
- Order: Pinales
- Family: Pinaceae
- Genus: Pinus
- Subgenus: P. subg. Strobus
- Section: P. sect. Parrya
- Subsection: P. subsect. Cembroides
- Species: P. rzedowskii

Binomial name
- Pinus rzedowskii Madrigal & M.Caball.

= Pinus rzedowskii =

Species of conifer

Pinus rzedowskii, commonly known as Rzedowski's pine, is a species of conifer in the pine family, Pinaceae.

It is endemic to western Michoacán state, in southwestern Mexico.
