= Hillia =

Hillia may refer to:

- Hillia (moth), a genus in the tribe Xylenini
- Hillia (plant), a genus in the family Rubiaceae
