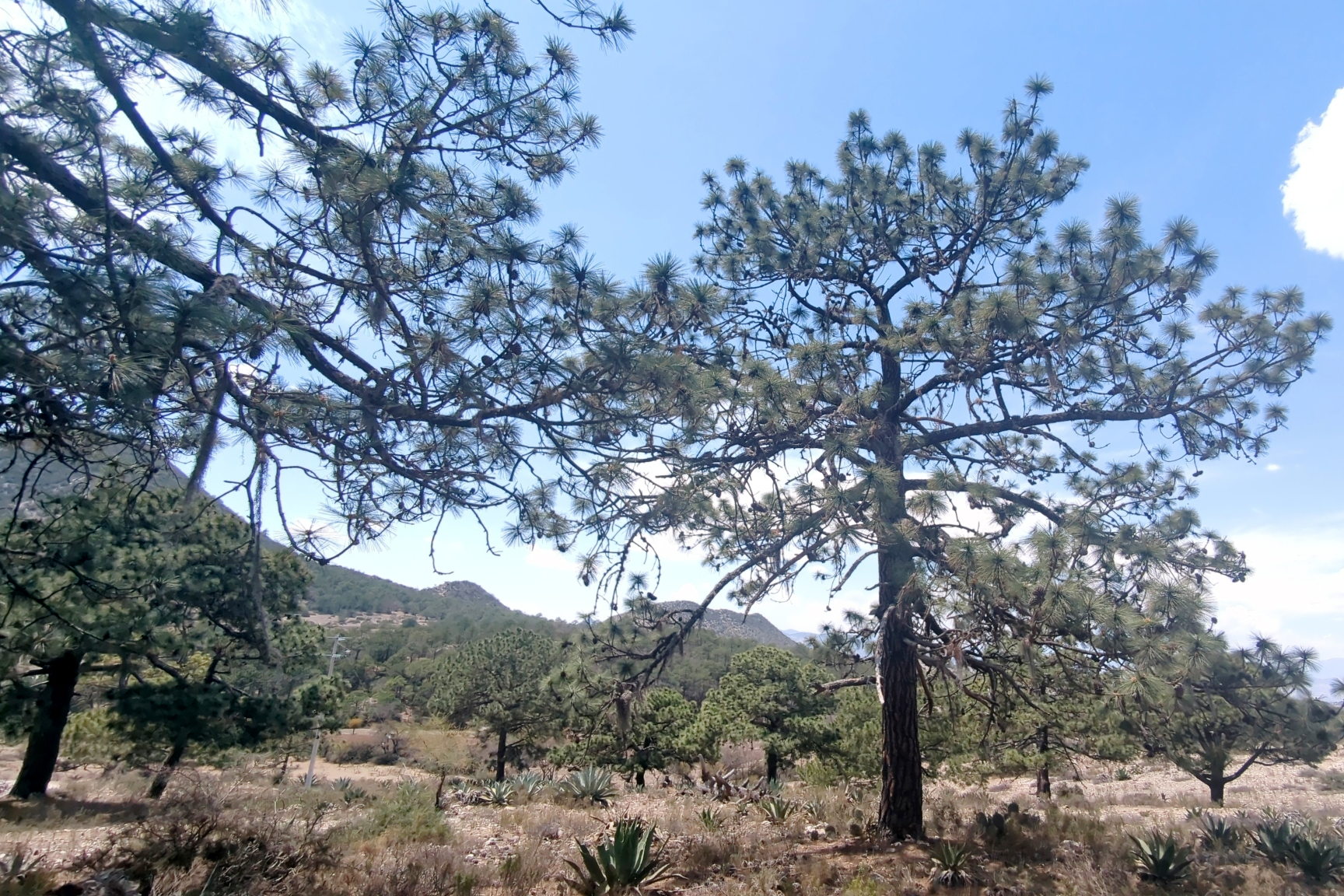
- Pinus stormiae west of Galeana, Nuevo León

Conservation status
- Vulnerable (IUCN 3.1)

Scientific classification
- Kingdom: Plantae
- Clade: Tracheophytes
- Clade: Gymnospermae
- Division: Pinophyta
- Class: Pinopsida
- Order: Pinales
- Family: Pinaceae
- Genus: Pinus
- Subgenus: P. subg. Pinus
- Section: P. sect. Trifoliae
- Subsection: P. subsect. Ponderosae
- Species: P. stormiae

Binomial name
- Pinus stormiae (Martínez) Frankis

Synonyms
- Pinus arizonica var. stormiae; Pinus arizonica subsp. stormiae; Pinus ponderosa var. stormiae

= Pinus stormiae =

North American species of pine tree

Pinus stormiae is a species of pine that mostly grows in the northeast of Mexico in the Sierra Madre Oriental pine–oak forests, but a small disjunct population also grows in a small area of far western Texas. It was only ranked as a species in 2024 and is still considered to be a variety of the Arizona pine Pinus arizonica in some sources.

== Description ==
Pinus stormiae is a moderate sized tree typically reaching 10–20 meters (33–66 ft) with a straight trunk. In older trees the trunk can be fairly wide, up to 120 cm (3.9 ft). The bark in young trees is rough and has deep cracks, and in older trees it takes the form of scaly brown to red-brown plates. The lower branches are thick and are horizontal to drooping, frequently almost brushing the ground. Higher up in the tree the branches usually have a slight upward bent. When new, the twigs are orange-brown and weather to dark gray-brown. The tree crowns are usually dense and somewhat round, though when young they will have a more conical shaped crown with more widely spaced branches.

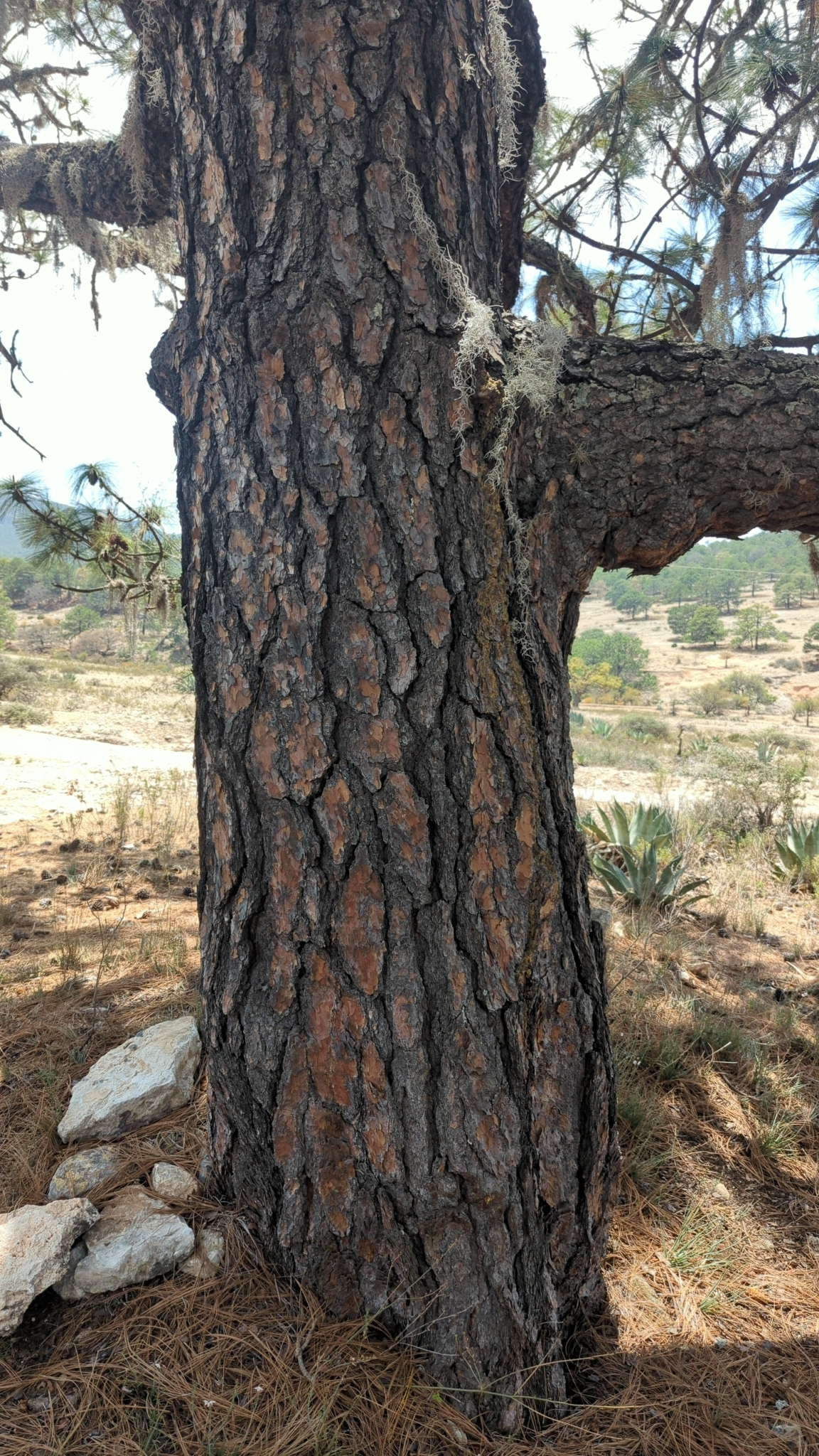
Bark on a larger tree

Its leaves resemble needles and are typically in fascicles or bundles of three, but quite often with four or five. Compared to other related pines its needles are particularly thick and rigid, and are also usually curved and twisted. They measure 14–25 cm long and 1.4–1.8 mm thick, and are typically a dull grayish green. The needle margins are very finely toothed.

The seed bearing cones are small to medium-sized and somewhat egg shaped, most often 4.5–10 cm long and 3.5–8 cm wide when opened. They are dark brown when mature with small, straight spines on the scales. On the trees they are in groups of two to four and release their seeds in November to December, though they do not fall from the branches for several months. The seeds are 5–6 mm long by 3.5–4 mm and a slightly flattened egg shape.

== Taxonomy ==
Pinus stormiae is classified in the subsection Ponderosae in the section named Trifoliae, part of the genus Pinus in the family Pinaceae.

Pinus stormiae was first described as a variety of Pinus arizonica in 1945 by the botanist Maximino Martínez. It was recombined as a variety of Pinus ponderosa in 1990 by John Silba (1961-2015), who then later published the combination as a subspecies of P. arizonica in 2009. In 2021, a genetic study found that its treatment in Pinus arizonica left that species paraphyletic, and in 2024 it was raised to the rank of species on the basis of this and its distinctive morphology.

Table of Synonyms
Name	Year	Rank
Pinus arizonica var. stormiae Martínez	1945	variety
Pinus arizonica subsp. stormiae (Martínez) Silba	2009	subspecies
Pinus ponderosa var. stormiae (Martínez) Silba	1990	variety

There is disagreement about its status as a species. It is listed as an accepted species by Plants of the World Online and World Plants, but is listed as an accepted variety of Pinus arizonica by World Flora Online. Similarly, when it was evaluated in 2013 by the IUCN and in 1994 by NatureServe it was as a variety.

=== Names ===
The species name is derived from its description of a variety named in honor of the American journalist Marian Isabel Storm. In its native Mexican range it is known by the Spanish common name of pino real meaning "royal pine" or as pino blanco meaning "white pine", however both Pinus teocote and Pinus engelmannii are known as pino real and eight species are sometimes known as pino blanco.

== Range and habitat ==
The majority of the species range is in the Mexican state of Nuevo León, but there is also a significant populations in southern Coahuila. There are also scattered populations in the north of Coahuila, a small one in the southwestern corner of Tamaulipas, and isolated populations in San Luis Potosí. In the United States it only grows in the Chisos Mountains western in Texas, close to the Mexican border. It can be found between elevations of 1,500 and 3,000 m (4,900 and 9,800 ft). The main part of its range is approximately 6,685 square kilometers (2,581 sq mi) with the total area occupied 768 km^{2} (297 sq mi) in three or four locations.

It grows in the Sierra Madre Oriental, often on west or southwest facing dry mountainsides. They often grow together, but also grow with oaks, junipers, and other pine species like Mexican pinyons and smooth-bark Mexican pines.

=== Conservation ===
In the 2011 IUCN Red List Pinus stormiae was evaluated as vulnerable, though at that time it was considered a variety of the Arizona pine. The population of the pines is decreasing in its range due to logging. Likewise, when NatureServe evaluated it in 1994 they considered it to be a vulnerable variety (T3) and rated it as critically imperiled at the state level (S1) in Texas.
