= Blepharidium =

Conservation status
- Least Concern (IUCN 3.1)

Scientific classification
- Kingdom: Plantae
- Clade: Tracheophytes
- Clade: Angiosperms
- Clade: Eudicots
- Clade: Asterids
- Order: Gentianales
- Family: Rubiaceae
- Subfamily: Cinchonoideae
- Tribe: Rondeletieae
- Genus: Blepharidium; Standl.
- Species: B. guatemalense

Binomial name
- Blepharidium guatemalense Standl.

Genus of plants

Blepharidium is a monotypic genus of flowering plants in the family Rubiaceae. The genus contains only one species, viz. Blepharidium guatemalense, which is native to Guatemala, Honduras and southern Mexico (Chiapas, Campeche, Tabasco). Older works might mention two species (viz. B. guatemalense and B. mexicanum).

== Systematics ==
Blepharidium was named by Paul Standley in 1918. The name is derived from the Ancient Greek words blepharitis or blepharidos, meaning "on an eyelid". The similar term, blepharis means "an eyelash".

A cladistic analysis of morphological characters found Blepharidium to be closely related to Cosmibuena, Balmea, and Hillia, but a molecular phylogenetic study placed it closer to Rondeletia.
