= Hillieae =

Scientific classification
- Kingdom: Plantae
- Clade: Tracheophytes
- Clade: Angiosperms
- Clade: Eudicots
- Clade: Asterids
- Order: Gentianales
- Family: Rubiaceae
- Subfamily: Cinchonoideae
- Tribe: Hillieae; Bremek. ex S.P.Darwin

Type genus
- Hillia Jacq.

Tribe of plants

Hillieae is a tribe of flowering plants in the family Rubiaceae and contains about 29 species in 3 genera. Its representatives are found in tropical America. The tribe is sometimes included in its sister tribe Hamelieae.

== Genera ==
Currently accepted names

- Balmea Martinez (1 sp)
- Cosmibuena Ruiz & Pav. (4 sp)
- Hillia Jacq. (24 sp)

Synonyms

- Buena Pohl = Cosmibuena
- Fereiria Vell. ex Vand. = Hillia
- Ravnia Oerst. = Hillia
- Saldanha Vell. = Hillia
