= Arboretum de Villardebelle =

Arboretum in Languedoc-Roussillon, France

Coordinates: 43°01′N 2°23′E

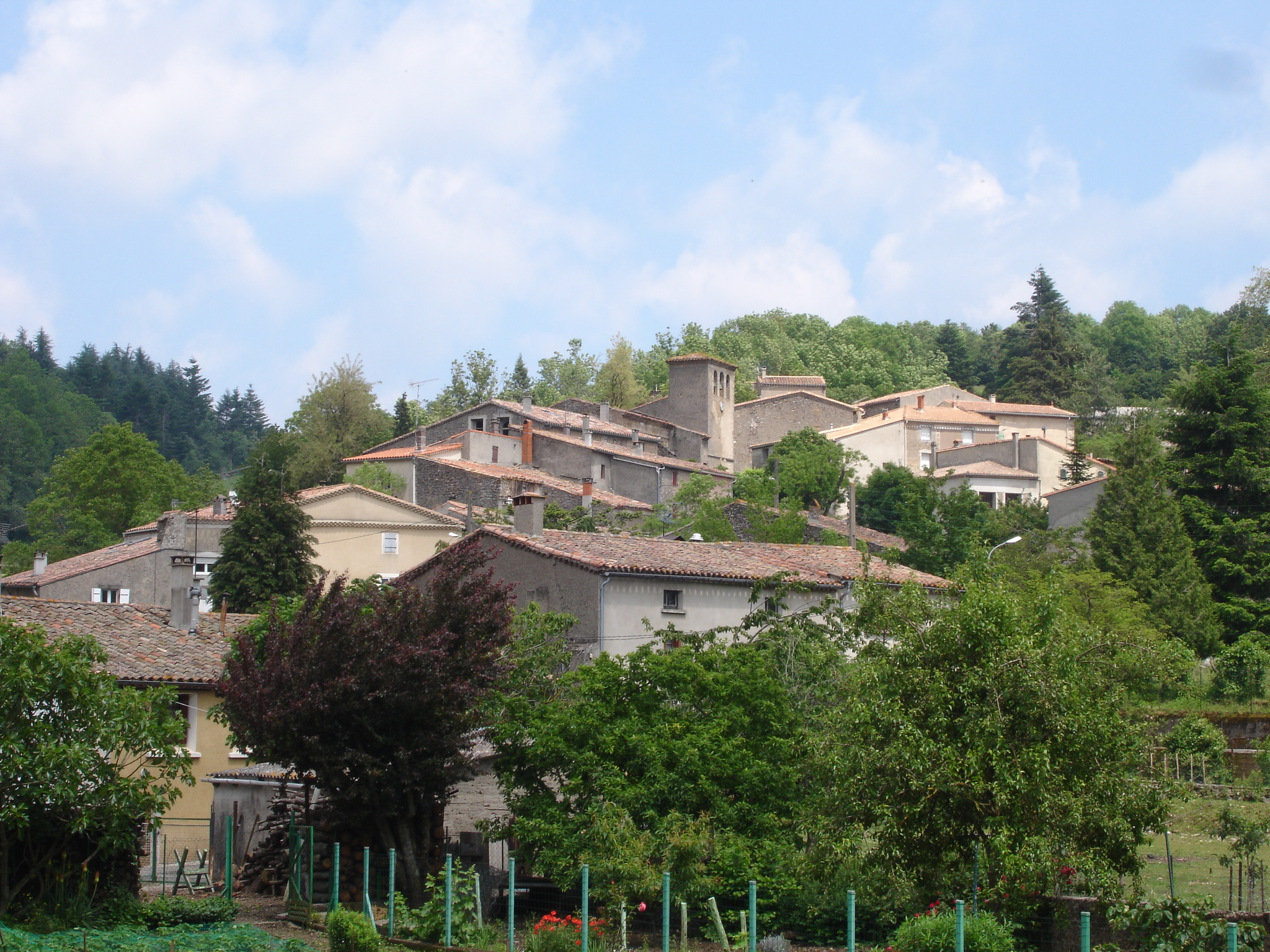

The Arboretum de Villardebelle (6 hectares) is an arboretum specializing in conifers located in Villardebelle, Aude, Languedoc-Roussillon, France.

The arboretum was established in 1994 on four locations across hilly terrain at an altitude of 510 to 670 meters, with stated aims including conservation of endangered species, scientific study and experimentation, education, environmental protection against erosion, and aesthetics. It is technically a pinetum because mainly dedicated to conifers.

== Specimens ==
The site's natural vegetation includes:

- Acer monspessulanum
- Buxus sempervirens
- Corylus avellana
- Crataegus monogyna
- Cupressus sempervirens
- Fraxinus excelsior
- Genista spp.
- Ilex aquifolium
- Juniperus communis
- Prunus avium
- Prunus spinosa
- Pteridium aquilinum
- Quercus ilex

Timber plantings in the region include:

- Cedrus atlantica
- Fagus sylvatica
- Picea sitchensis
- Pinus nigra laricio or calabrica
- Pinus sylvestris
- Pseudotsuga menziesii
- Quercus

Since 1994 the arboretum has planted over 3500 specimens, mainly from seeds, including more than 190 Gymnosperm species and subspecies. A further hundred species are being cultivated in the arboretum's nursery. Some specimens of interest include:

- Araucaria araucana
- Calocedrus decurrens
- Calocedrus formosana
- Cedrus atlantica
- Cupressus dupreziana
- Cupressus torulosa
- Cupressus chengiana
- Taiwania cryptomerioides
- Juniperus occidentalis
- Juniperus thurifera
- Juniperus deppeana
- Metasequoia glyptostroboides
- Picea chihuahuana
- Pinus attenuata
- Pinus coulteri
- Pinus ponderosa
- Platycladus orientalis
- Prumnopitys andina
- Sequoia sempervirens
- Thujopsis dolabrata
- Tetraclinis articulata

== See also ==
- List of botanical gardens in France
