= Balmea =

Conservation status
- Endangered (IUCN 3.1)
- CITES Appendix I (CITES)

Scientific classification
- Kingdom: Plantae
- Clade: Tracheophytes
- Clade: Angiosperms
- Clade: Eudicots
- Clade: Asterids
- Order: Gentianales
- Family: Rubiaceae
- Subfamily: Cinchonoideae
- Tribe: Hillieae
- Genus: Balmea; Martínez
- Species: B. stormiae

Binomial name
- Balmea stormiae Martínez
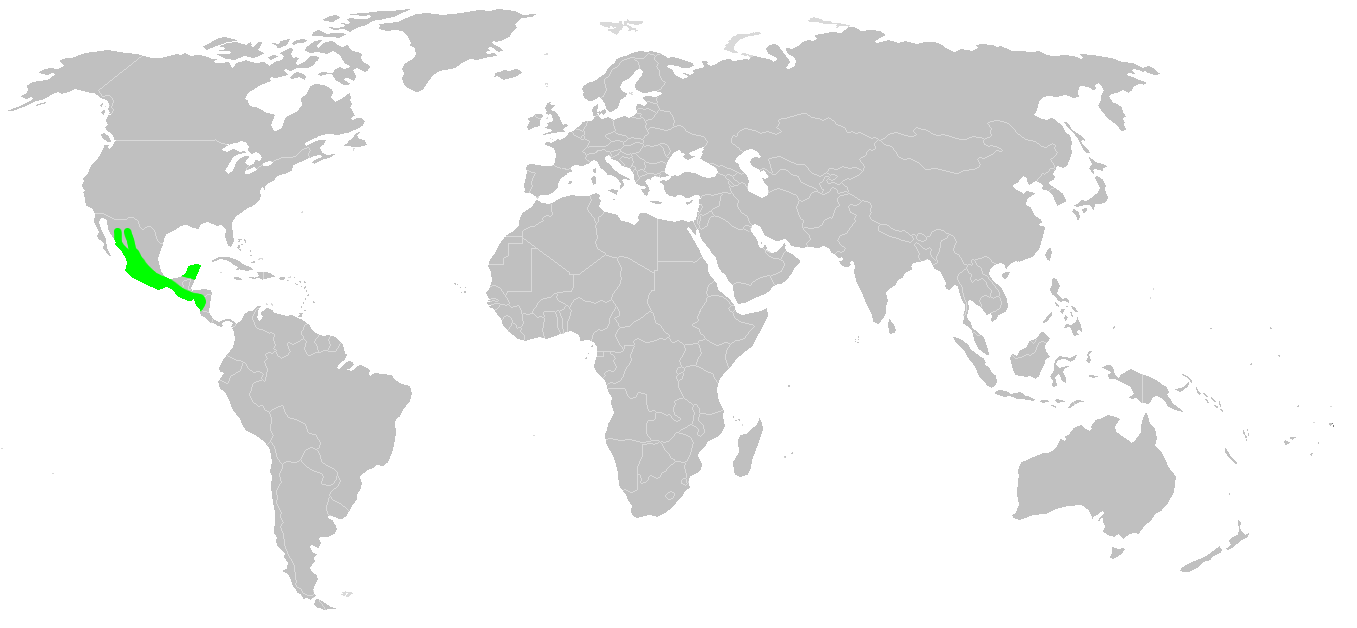

Species of plant

Balmea is a monospecific genus of flowering plants in the family Rubiaceae containing the single species Balmea stormiae. It is native to El Salvador, Guatemala and Mexico (Nayarit, Jalisco, Colima, Guerrero, Michoacán, Chiapas). It is locally known as ayuque. It is conical in shape and used as a Christmas tree in parts of Mexico. Because populations are depleted by this overharvest, this species is threatened with extinction.

== Description ==
The plant is a shrub of four to seven meters. The smooth, greenish purple bark peels off in irregular thin shreds. The hard wood is whitish. The broadly ovate and shortly acuminate leaves are clustered at the end of the branches. The shrub flowers from August to October and the hermaphroditic flowers are scarlet-red, tinged with purple. When fully open they turn dark purple and at night a sweet scent emanates from them. The fruits ripen from December to January and are erect capsules, about 25 mm long that open at the tip in two follicle-like portions. The numerous seed show reticulate wings of about 4 mm.

== Taxonomy ==
The genus is named in honor of botanist Juan Balme and the species name honors Marian Storm, a collaborator of the describer. The genus is closely related to Cosmibuena and Blepharidium.
