= Abies menziesii =

Abies menziesii is a botanical synonym of three species of plant:

- Picea pungens, synonym published in 1862 by George Engelmann
- Picea sitchensis, synonym published in 1833 by John Lindley
- Pseudotsuga menziesii, synonym published in 1825 by Charles-François Brisseau de Mirbel
