= Villardebelle =

Commune in Occitanie, France

- Commune
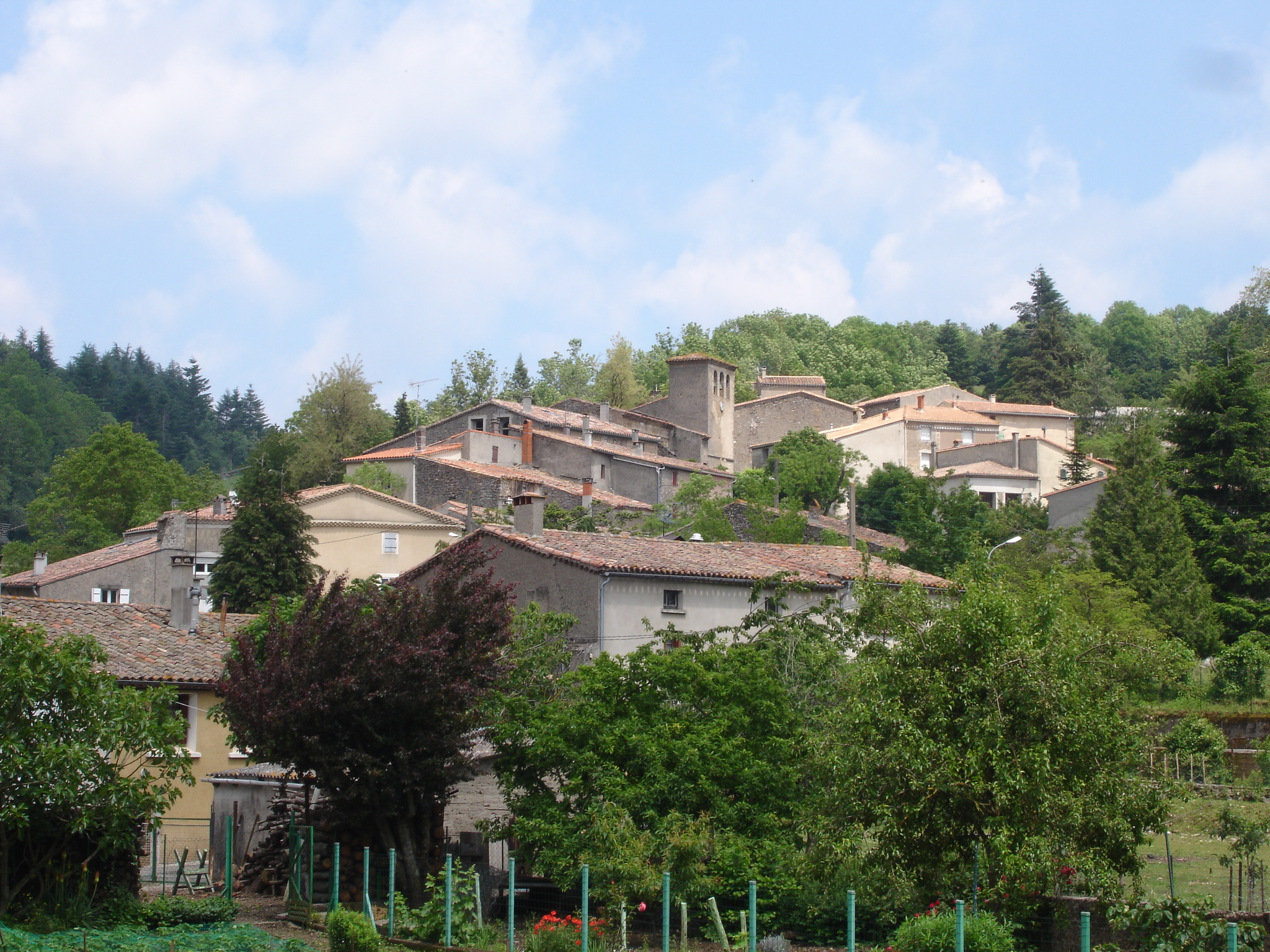
- A general view of Villardebelle

- Coat of arms
- Location of Villardebelle
- Location within France Location within Occitanie
- Coordinates: 43°01′19″N 2°23′36″E
- Country: France
- Region: Occitania
- Department: Aude
- Arrondissement: Limoux
- Canton: La Région Limouxine
- Intercommunality: Limouxin

Government
  - Mayor (2020–2026): Marguerite Falcou
- Area^{1}: 13.14 km^{2} (5.07 sq mi)
- Elevation: 540 m (1,770 ft)
- Highest elevation: 857 m (2,812 ft)
- Lowest elevation: 414 m (1,358 ft)
- Population (2023): 66
  - Density: 5.0/km^{2} (13/sq mi)
- Time zone: UTC+01:00 (CET)
  - Summer (DST): UTC+02:00 (CEST)
- INSEE/Postal code: 11412 /11580
- ^{1} French Land Register data, which excludes lakes, ponds, glaciers > 1 km^{2} (0.386 sq mi or 247 acres) and river estuaries.

Villardebelle (French pronunciation: [vilaʁdəbɛl]; Occitan: Vilardebèla) is a commune in the Aude department in southern France.

== Population ==
Historical population
Year	Pop.	±% p.a.
1968	101	—
1975	84	−2.60%
1982	64	−3.81%
1990	61	−0.60%
1999	74	+2.17%
2007	71	−0.52%
2012	59	−3.64%
2017	53	−2.12%
2023	66	+3.72%
Source: INSEE

== Sights ==
- Arboretum de Villardebelle
