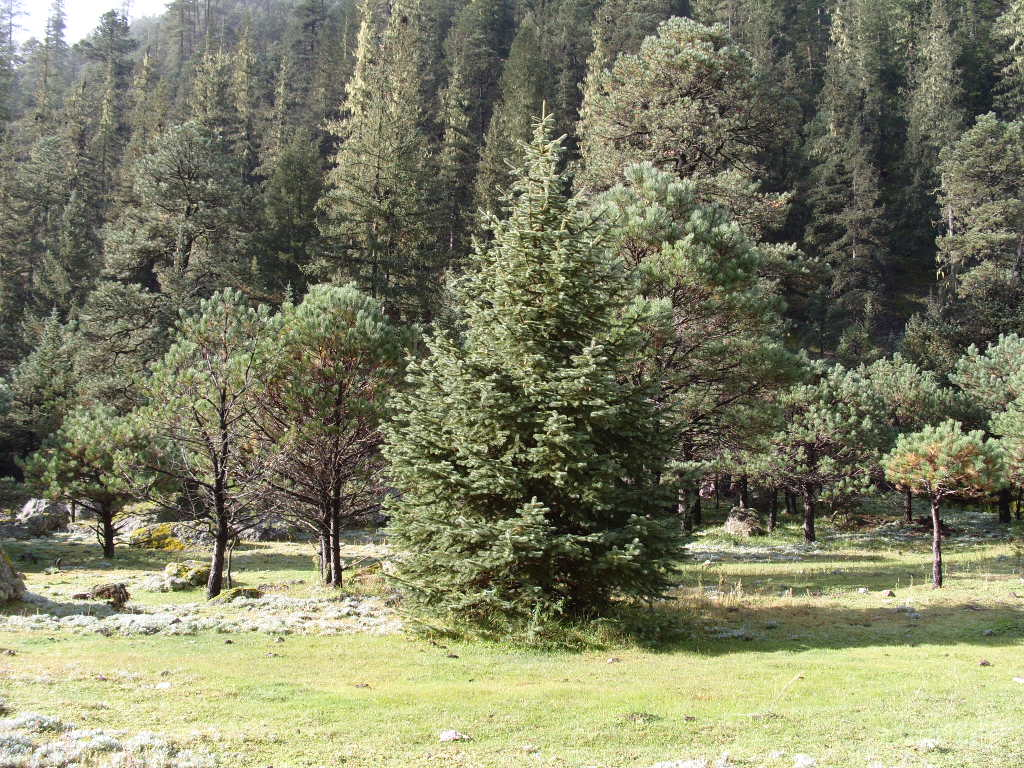
- Growing in Guanaceví, Durango, Mexico

Conservation status
- Endangered (IUCN 3.1)

Scientific classification
- Kingdom: Plantae
- Clade: Tracheophytes
- Clade: Gymnosperms
- Division: Pinophyta
- Class: Pinopsida
- Order: Pinales
- Family: Pinaceae
- Genus: Picea
- Species: P. chihuahuana

Binomial name
- Picea chihuahuana Martinez
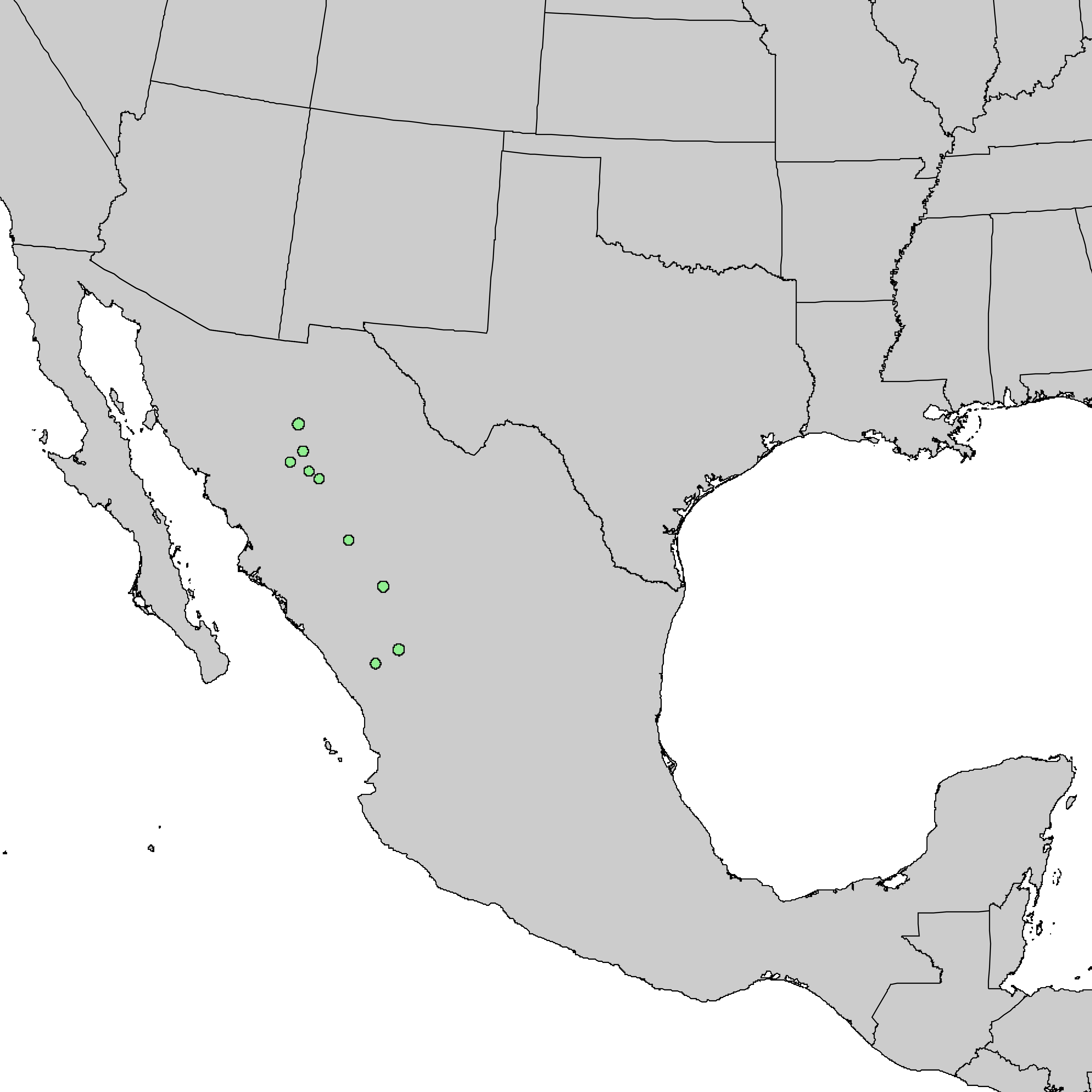
- Natural range of Picea chihuahuana

= Picea chihuahuana =

Chihuahua spruce

Species of conifer

Picea chihuahuana, the Chihuahua spruce, is a medium-sized evergreen tree growing to 25–35 m tall, and with a trunk diameter of up to 1 m. It is native to northwest Mexico, where it occurs in 25 small populations in the Sierra Madre Occidental mountains in Chihuahua and Durango. It grows at moderate altitudes from 2300 to 3200 m, growing along streamsides in mountain valleys, where moisture levels in the soil are greater than the otherwise low rainfall in the area would suggest.

The bark is thin and scaly, flaking off in small circular plates 5–10 cm across. The crown is conic, with widely spaced branches with drooping branchlets. The shoots are stout, pale buff-brown, glabrous, and with prominent pulvini. The leaves are needle-like, 17–23 mm long, stout, rhombic in cross-section, bright glaucous blue-green with conspicuous lines of stomata; the tip is viciously sharp.

The cones are pendulous, broad cylindrical, 7–12 cm long and 3 cm broad when closed, opening to 4–5 cm broad. They have stiff, bluntly rounded scales 1.5–2 cm broad, and are green, maturing pale brown 6–8 months after pollination. The seeds are black, 4 mm long, with a 10–13 mm long pale brown wing.

Chihuahua spruce was only discovered in 1942 by the Mexican botanist Maximino Martínez, and is endangered with just 25 small populations, none comprising more than a few hundred trees. It is related to Martinez's spruce (P. martinezii) from northeast Mexico, but differs in the shorter, blue-green leaves, and the smaller, narrower cones with smaller scales. No other related spruces are found in North America, with its next-closest relatives in eastern Asia.

As one of the most heat-tolerant spruces, it is increasingly starting to be planted as an ornamental tree in botanical gardens replacing the more sensitive Picea pungens.
