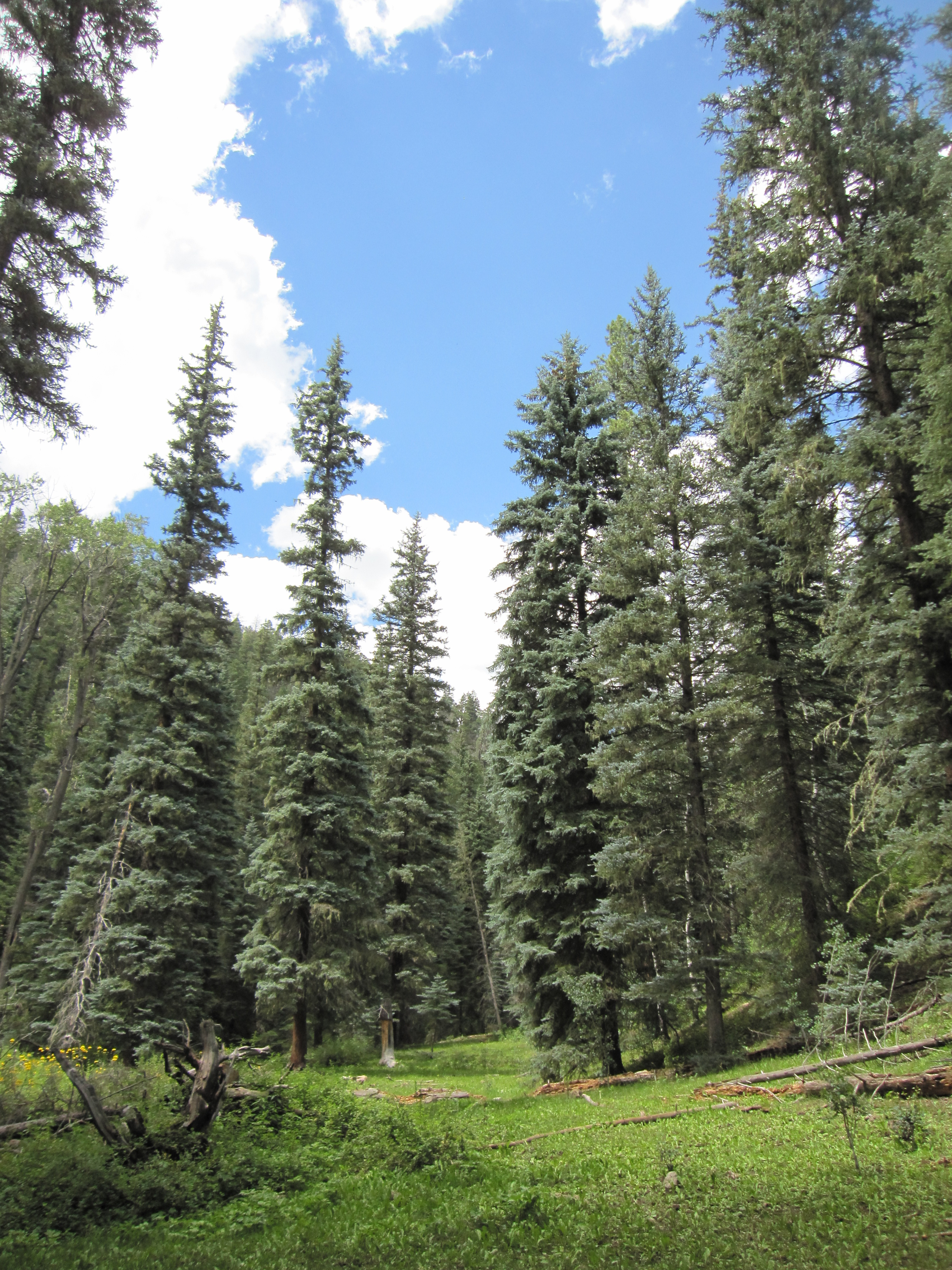
- Blue spruces in San Juan National Forest, Colorado

Conservation status
- Least Concern (IUCN 3.1)

- Secure (NatureServe)

Scientific classification
- Kingdom: Plantae
- Clade: Tracheophytes
- Clade: Gymnosperms
- Division: Pinophyta
- Class: Pinopsida
- Order: Pinales
- Family: Pinaceae
- Genus: Picea
- Species: P. pungens

Binomial name
- Picea pungens Engelm.
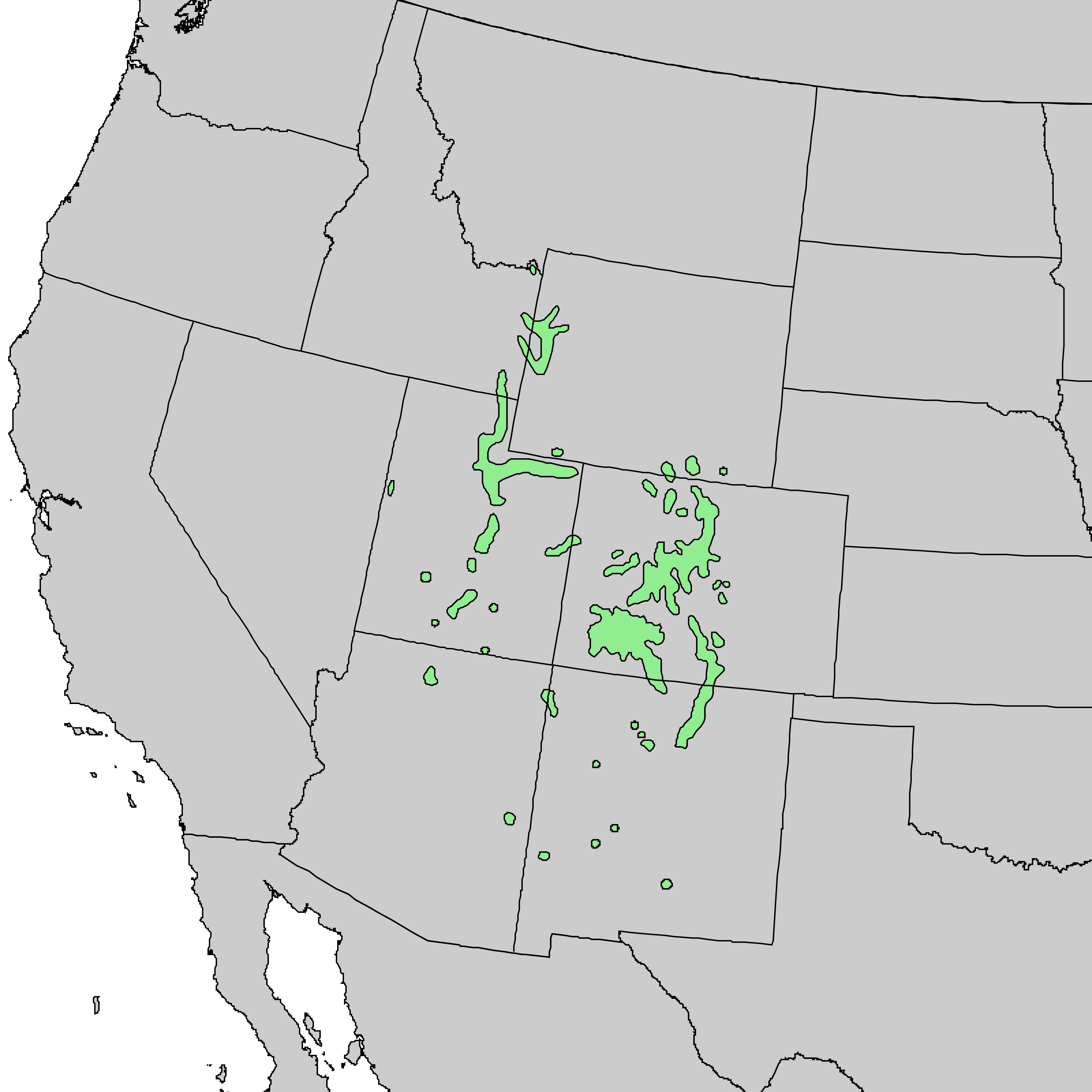

Synonyms
- Abies menziesii Engelm.; Abies parlatorei Dallim. & A.B.Jacks.; Picea commutata Beissn.; Picea menziesii Engelm.; Picea parryana (André) Sarg.; Pinus armata Voss; Pinus parryana (André) Voss

= Blue spruce =

Species of tree

The blue spruce (Picea pungens), also commonly known as Colorado spruce or Colorado blue spruce, is a species of spruce tree native to North America in Arizona, Colorado, Idaho, New Mexico, Utah and Wyoming. It is noted for its often strongly glaucous blue-green needles, and has therefore been used as an ornamental tree in many places far beyond its native range.

== Description ==
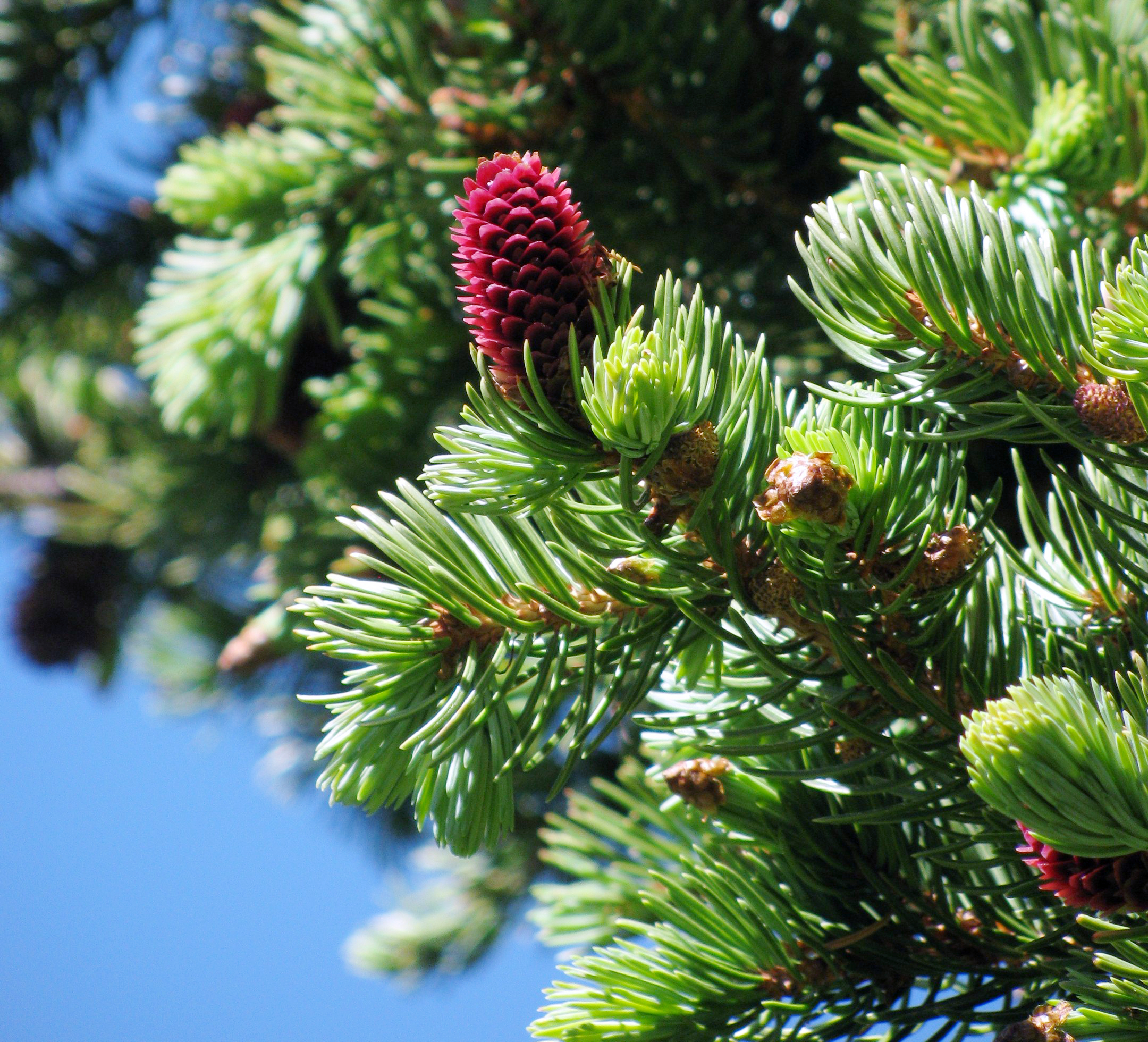
Foliage and young cone, Pecos Wilderness, New Mexico

In the wild, Picea pungens grows to as much as 50 meters (164 ft) in height, but more typically 30 m (98 ft) tall. When planted in parks and gardens it most often grows 9 to 18 m (30 to 60 ft) tall with a spread of 3 to 6 m (10 to 20 ft). It has scaly gray-brown bark with a slight amount of a cinnamon-red undertone on its trunk, not as rough as an Engelmann spruce. On older trees the trunk bark becomes deeply furrowed and scaly. The trunk diameter may reach as much as 1.5 m (4.9 ft). The root system is of the blue spruce is dense and compact, lacking a taproot.

Blue spruce is a conifer with a conical crown when young, but more open and irregular in shape as it becomes older. The stout branches grow out horizontally in well defined whorls, but lower branches droop downwards as trees age. Young twigs never hang downwards and are yellow-brown in color.

The narrow, needle-like, evergreen leaves are quite sharply pointed and may be dull green, blue, or pale white. The white or blue glaucous color is caused by surface waxes on the needles, is most visible on newly emerging foliage, and fades towards summer. In the wild stands of trees tend to have similar coloration. Each of the needles is four sided with stomata on every side, stiff, and 1.6–3 centimeters (3/4–1 1/4 in) long. The needles are attached radially to their shoots, but curve upward. The leaf buds are golden brown and cone shaped. The buds may be 6 to 12 millimeters (1/4 to 1/2 in) in size and the tip may either be blunt or pointed.

The pollen producing cones, more properly strobili, develop throughout the crown of blue spruce trees, but are more common in the upper half of the crown. Pollen cones are mainly yellow with a touch of red and average 1.5 cm (1/2 in) long. The seed cones begin growing in May or June and release their mature seeds in the autumn of the same year in which they start to grow. When young they are purple-brown in color. When fully mature they are light brown, longer than they are wide, circular in cross section with thin, papery scales and can be curved or straight. The cones can measure between 5 and 12 cm (2 and 4 3/4 in) long, but are more typically 6 to 11 cm (2 1/4 to 4 1/4 in). The seed cones are only found in the top tenth to quarter of the tree and are normally near the end of side branches.

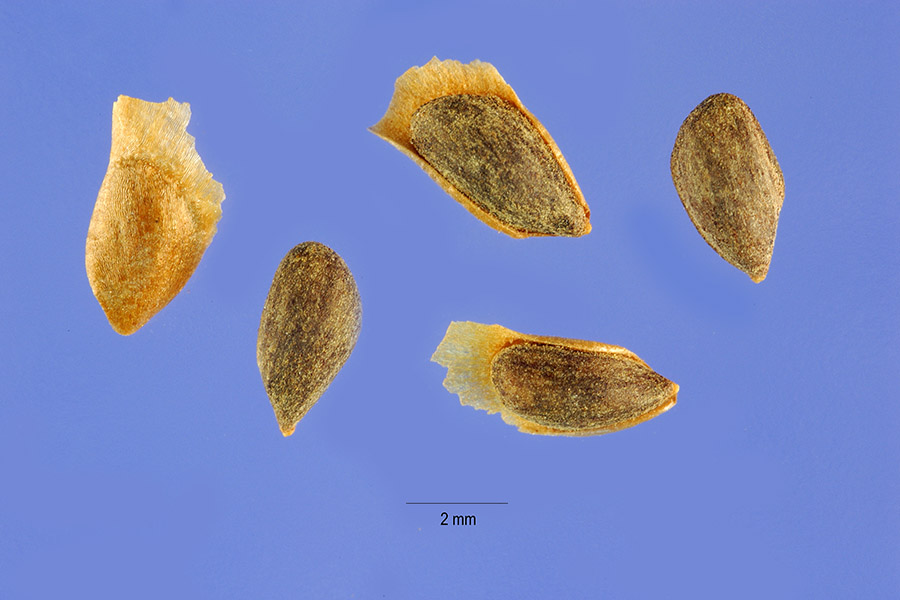
Seeds of blue spruce

The seeds are dark brown. They average 4 mm in length with the papery wing extending beyond the tip almost twice this length.

The blue spruce can be confused with four other spruce species, Engelmann spruce, European spruce (Picea abies), white spruce (Picea glauca), and black spruce Picea mariana), however only the range of the Engelmann spruce overlaps with the blue spruce in the wild. Though larger for the blue spruce, the measurements of their cones and cone scales overlap with the Engelmann spruce. The cones of the Engelmann measuring 3–8 cm with the scales measuring 3–8 mm beyond the seed impression while the blue spruce measures 5–12 cm with scales that measure 8–10 mm beyond the seed impression. However, the twigs of the Engelman are always finely hairy while those of the blue are usually hairless.

=== Chemistry ===
The phytochemistry of the blue spruce is relatively little studied. The ripe seeds have a 1.17% yield of essential oils while the cones produce only 0.38% when steam distilled for four hours. The main component, over 40%, of the essential oils is limonene with β-Pinene and α-Pinene the next most significant.

== Taxonomy ==
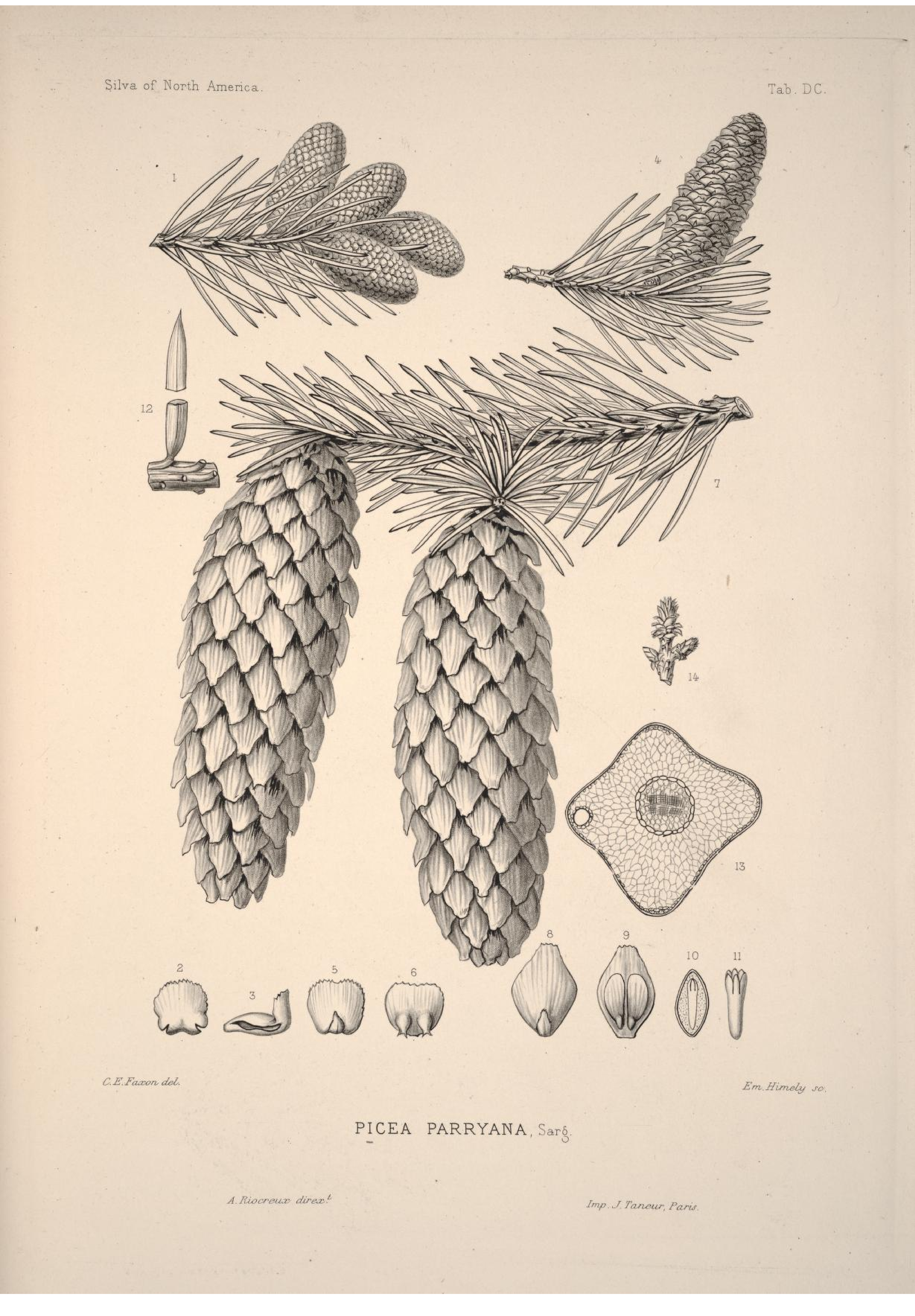
The branches and cones of Picea pungens, then called Picea parryana as illustrated by Charles Edward Faxon in The Silva of North America

Picea pungens was given its first valid scientific description by George Engelmann in 1879. He had previously named it Abies menziesii in 1862 and later as Picea menziesii in 1863, but both those names had already been used making them illegitimate names. The specimens of the tree used to describe it were collected by Charles Christopher Parry on Pikes Peak, also in 1862.

There was confusion regarding the correct scientific name for the species during the late 1800s and early 1900s with Picea parryana believed by many to be the correct name, though with various authorities attached to it. This was caused by the 1876 description of it as a variety of Abies menziesii named parryana by André Michaux coming before its description by Engelmann in 1879. Despite this, Picea pungens was used as the correct name throughout this time by well known scientists such as Ludwig Beissner, Alfred Rehder, and Augustine Henry. By 1925 Picea pungens was being used for the species in US government scientific publications. It is classified in the genus Picea as part of the family Pinaceae. It has no accepted varieties, but has several in its 35 heterotypic synonyms.

Table of Synonyms
Name	Year	Rank	Notes
Abies commutata var. glauca Chargueraud	1889	variety	
Abies menziesii Engelm.	1862	species	nom. illeg.
Abies menziesii var. parryana André	1876	variety	
Abies parlatorei Dallim. & A.B.Jacks.	1923	species	
Picea commutata Beissn.	1891	species	
Picea menziesii Engelm.	1863	species	nom. illeg.
Picea menziesii var. parryana André	1876	variety	
Picea parryana (André) Sarg.	1905	species	
Picea parryana argentea R.C.Rosenthal	1887		
Picea parryana glauca-pendens (Sudw.) Sudw.	1898		
Picea parryana glauca-pendula (H.Kost. ex Beissn.) André	1901		
Picea pungens f. argentea Branner	1918	form	nom. illeg.
Picea pungens f. argentea (R.C.Rosenthal) Beissn.	1887	form	
Picea pungens argentea-pendula Beissn.	1899		nom. subnud.
Picea pungens f. coerulea Beissn.	1891	form	
Picea pungens var. compacta (Rehder) Rehder	1916	variety	
Picea pungens f. compacta Rehder	1915	form	
Picea pungens var. glauca Regel	1883	variety	
Picea pungens f. glauca (Regel) Beissn.	1887	form	
Picea pungens glauca-pendens Sudw.	1897		
Picea pungens f. glauca-pendula H.Kost. ex Beissn.	1891	form	
Picea pungens var. hunnewelliana Hornibr.	1923	variety	
Picea pungens f. hunnewelliana (Hornibr.) Rehder	1949	form	
Picea pungens var. kosteriana A.Henry	1912	variety	
Picea pungens f. kosteriana (A.Henry) O.L.Lipa	1939	form	
Picea pungens f. pendens Rehder	1949	form	
Picea pungens var. pendula (Mouill.) Zederb.	1907	variety	
Picea pungens subvar. pendula Mouill.	1898	subvariety	
Picea pungens f. pendula Schwer.	1920	form	nom. illeg.
Picea pungens f. perpendicularis Schwer.	1920	form	
Picea pungens f. typica Schwer.	1920	form	not validly publ.
Picea pungens var. viridis Regel	1883	variety	
Picea pungens f. viridis (Regel) O.L.Lipa	1939	form	
Pinus armata Voss	1907	species	
Pinus parryana (André) Voss	1907	species	nom. illeg.

Genetic analysis of the genus Picea indicates that the closest living relative of the blue spruce may be Picea mexicana, a disputed species from northern Mexico also known as Picea engelmannii subsp. mexicana. Together they are part of a group with seven other related species that includes all the species from North America except for Brewer's spruce (Picea breweriana). The related species include Sitka spruce (Picea sitchensis), white spruce (Picea glauca) and Engelmann spruce (Picea engelmannii), black spruce (Picea mariana), red spruce (Picea rubens), Chihuahua spruce (Picea chihuahuana), and Nuevo León spruce (Picea martinezii). Though visually very similar, the blue spruce and Engelmann spruce split from their common ancestor between 10 and 20 million years ago.

=== Names ===
Picea, the genus name, is thought to come from the Latin word pix meaning "pitch", a reference to the typical sticky resin in spruce bark. The specific epithet pungens means "sharply pointed", referring to the leaves.

The most frequently used common name in English is blue spruce. It was first used for other trees in 1817 and is still used for any spruce tree with a glaucous blue color to their needles, but most frequently meaning Picea pungens. Though this is the most common name, in the wild only part of the population has the waxy blue-gray coating for which the tree is named. Less frequently, but still common, is Colorado blue spruce, a name first used in 1912. The usage of Colorado spruce dates to 1881, but is less frequent than the longer alternate. Due to its affinity with streams and well watered canyons it is also known as the water spruce. Occasionally encountered are the names Parry's spruce, prickly spruce, silver spruce, and white spruce. Blue spruces are also rarely called silvertip fir, but this name is also applied to Abies magnifica especially when sold as Christmas trees. In addition it is sometimes labeled as Colorado green spruce or green spruce by plant nurseries or tree farms.

Similar to the meaning of the scientific name, the Navajo name for this species is a compound c'ó deniní with c'ó meaning spruce and deniní meaning "it is sharp".

== Ecology ==
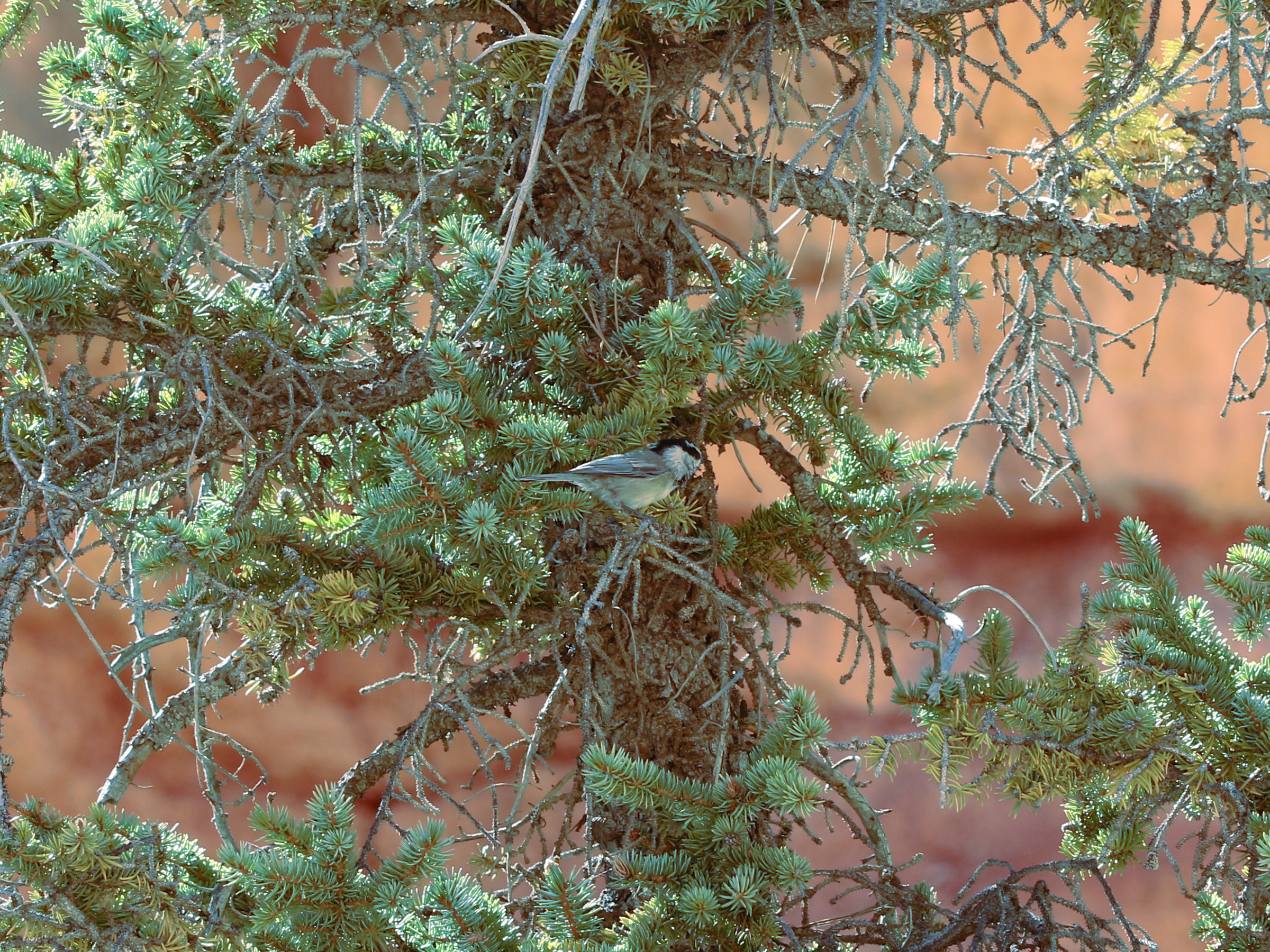
A mountain chickadee foraging in blue spruce foliage, Bryce Canyon

Blue Spruce occurs at high elevations, 1,830 to 2,740 meters (6,000 to 8,990 ft) in the forests of the South Central Rockies and 2,130 to 3,050 meters (6,990 to 10,010 ft) in the Southern Rocky Mountains. It grows in mesic montane conifer forests, often associating with Rocky Mountain Douglas-fir, ponderosa pine, or white fir. It has a riparian affinity, preferring moist soils such as those along streams or at the edges of wet meadows. The Douglas-fir or ponderosa pine only become associated with streams at lower, warmer elevations. It also may be found alongside the quaking aspen (Populus tremuloides) in the high mountain habitats of desert ranges in the Intermountain West. At the lowest elevations of its range it also becomes associated with aspens in the well watered stream bottoms with their deep alluvial soils. Though associated with the Rocky Mountain Douglas-fir, the blue spruce is more tolerant of drought and intense sunlight.

Blue spruce usually grows in cool and humid climatic zones where the annual precipitation mainly occurs in the summer. Blue spruce is generally considered to grow best with abundant moisture. Nevertheless, this species can withstand drought better than any other spruce. It can withstand extremely low temperatures (-40 degrees C) as well. Furthermore, this species is more resistant to frost damage compared to other associated species.

=== Distributed soil types and topography ===
Blue spruce generally exists on gentle uplands and sub irrigated slopes, in well-watered tributary drainage, extending down intermittent streams, and on lower northerly slopes.

Blue spruce is considered as a pioneer tree species in moist soil in Utah.

=== Rooting habits ===
Blue spruce seedlings have shallow roots that penetrate approximately 6 centimeters (2.5 in) into the soil during the first year of growth. Although freezing can't damage much in blue spruce, frost heaving will cause seedling loss. Shadows in late spring and early autumn minimize this frost heaving loss. Despite the shallow roots, blue spruce is able to resist strong winds.

=== Pests and diseases ===
The blue spruce is attacked by two species of Adelges, an aphid-like insect that causes galls to form. Nymphs of the pineapple gall adelgid form galls at the base of twigs which resemble miniature pineapples and those of the Cooley's spruce gall adelgid cause cone-shaped galls at the tips of branches. The larva of the spruce budworm eat the buds and growing shoots while the spruce needle miner hollows out the needles and makes them coalesce in a webbed mass. An elongated white scale insect, the pine needle scale feeds on the needles causing fluffy white patches on the twigs and aphids also suck sap from the needles and may cause them to fall and possibly dieback. Mites can also infest the blue spruce, especially in a dry summer, causing yellowing of the oldest needles. An occasional insect pest is the spruce beetle (Dendroctonus rufipennis) which bores under the bark. It is much more likely to use Engelmann spruces as the host trees and generally prefers to feed on trees that have been knocked over unless their numbers become very high.

The blue spruce is susceptible to several needle casting diseases which cause the needles to turn yellow, mottled or brown before they fall off. Various rust diseases also affect the tree causing yellowing of the needles as well as needle fall. Canker caused by Cytospora attacks one of the lower branches first and progressively makes its way higher up the tree. The first symptom is the needles turning reddish-brown and falling off. Meanwhile, patches of white resin appear on the bark and the branch eventually dies.

In Britain and central Europe ornamental blue spruces are damaged by the spruce aphid (Elatobium abietinum), particularly after mild winters. This species has become established in North America since 1915 and in the southwestern United States since 1976. In the southwest it attacks wild populations of Engelmann spruce and the blue spruce, though with a somewhat lower severity. Heavily infested trees will lose their needles or die for up to three years after being damaged.

It is also relatively intolerant of light pollution and when planted near street lights or other outdoor lighting its preparation for winter can be delayed and parts of the tree may be damaged.

== Range ==
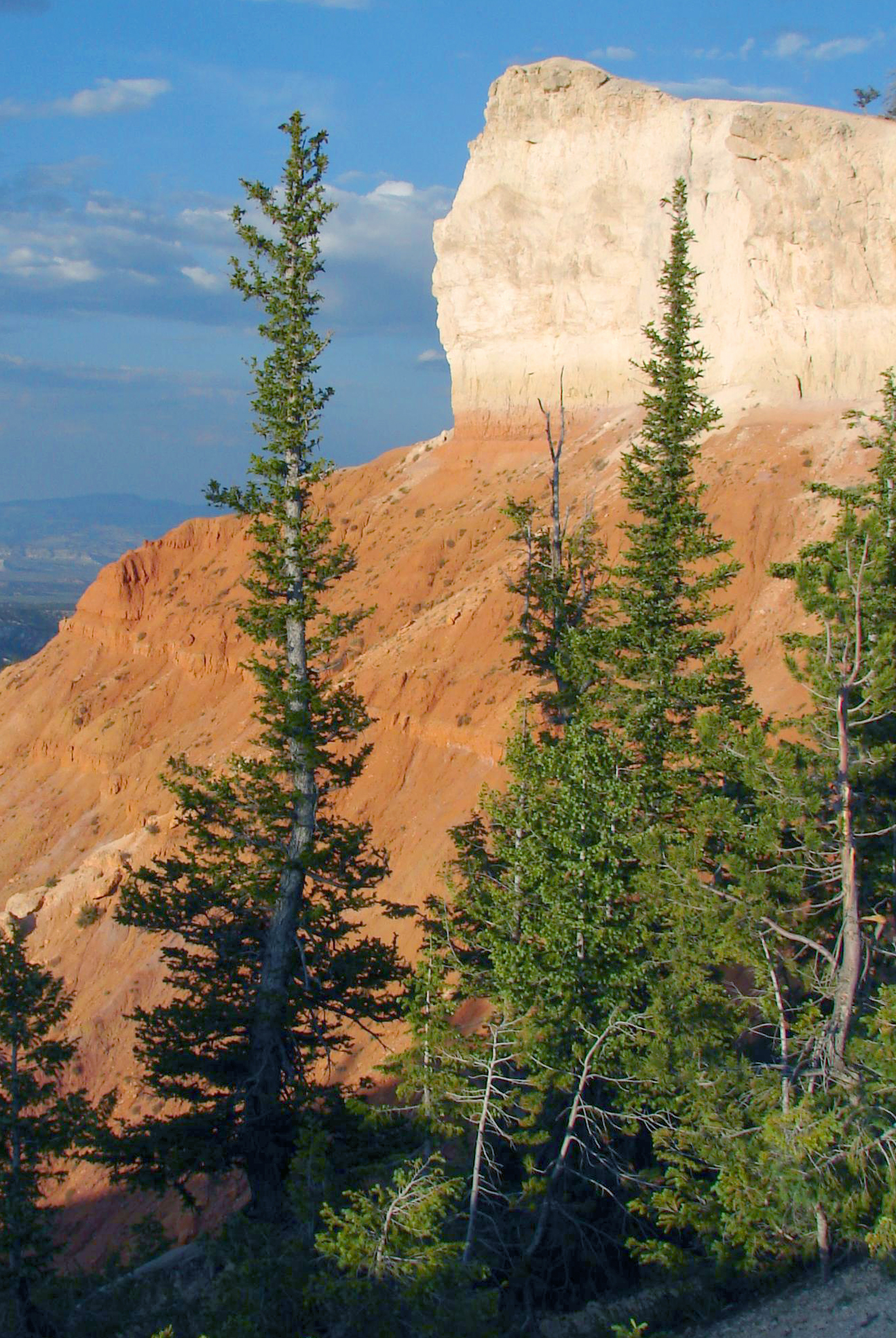
Blue spruces in Bryce Canyon, Utah

The native range of the blue spruce is largely in the Central and Southern Rocky Mountains and moist mountain valleys and canyons to the west. In New Mexico it only grows naturally in the higher mountain ranges of the state such as the Sandia–Manzano Mountains, Sangre de Cristo Mountains, Jemez Mountains, and San Juan Mountains, as well as on Sierra Blanca Peak to the south. In Arizona the range is even more limited, growing in just Coconino and Apache counties. In Apache County it is found in the White Mountains in central eastern Arizona and the Lukachukai Mountains in the northeastern corner of the state. In Coconino County they only grow on the Kaibab Plateau. The blue spruce grows in every county in the western two-thirds of Colorado; approximately half of natural range of the species is in the mountains of Colorado. In Utah they are a locally common part of forests in the Uinta Mountains. West of the Uintas blue spruces are less frequent in canyons south of Salt Lake City.

The blue spruce has only very rarely become naturalized outside of its native range and is not considered an invasive species. In North America has escaped from cultivation in the states of Minnesota, Maryland, Pennsylvania, New York, and Maine as well as in the Canadian provinces of Ontario and Nova Scotia, and it is considered naturalized in New York and New England. In Europe it has been found outside cultivation in many areas including Iceland, on Great Britain, in Norway, and Sweden. It is also known from France, Belgium, Germany, Switzerland, Italy, and Austria.

In the former Czechoslovakia in the 1970s and 1980s large areas of forest died due to sulpher dioxde pollution from coal fired power plants. In the Ore Mountains the Ministry of Agriculture of the Czech Republic replanted many areas with non-native species including 8,800 hectares (22,000 acres) with blue spruce, second in area only to the birch tree. Small numbers were also planted on the upper plateau of the Jizera Mountains when new forests were established in the 1990s alongside the Serbian spruces (Picea omorica), although the majority of spruces planted were the native European spruce. Despite the large areas planted they have not established themselves outside of cultivation.

In Eastern Europe they are an introduced species in the Baltic States, central European Russia, Bulgaria, and the Transcaucasus.

== Notable trees ==
The tallest documented blue spruce tree is an individual in the San Juan Mountains of southern Colorado in the Hermosa Creek area. When measured by Matt Markworth in 2015 it was 54.9 meters (180 ft) tall. Just three years later in 2018, it was threatened by the 416 Fire. Though the fire killed a shorter 50.4 m (165.5 ft) American champion tree with a larger trunk and crown spread, the tall tree was spared due to being located in a sheltered valley.

The National Champion Tree for the species is one located in the Wasatch Range in Utah. When last measured in 2020, it was 39 m (129 ft) tall with a crown spread of 12 m (41 ft) and a diameter at breast height of 1.6 m (63.5 in).

A tree named Old Blue by researchers found in the Cedar Breaks National Monument when cored in 2024 was dated to sprouting in 1564, an age of 462 years. This is the oldest known blue spruce tree.

== Cultivation ==
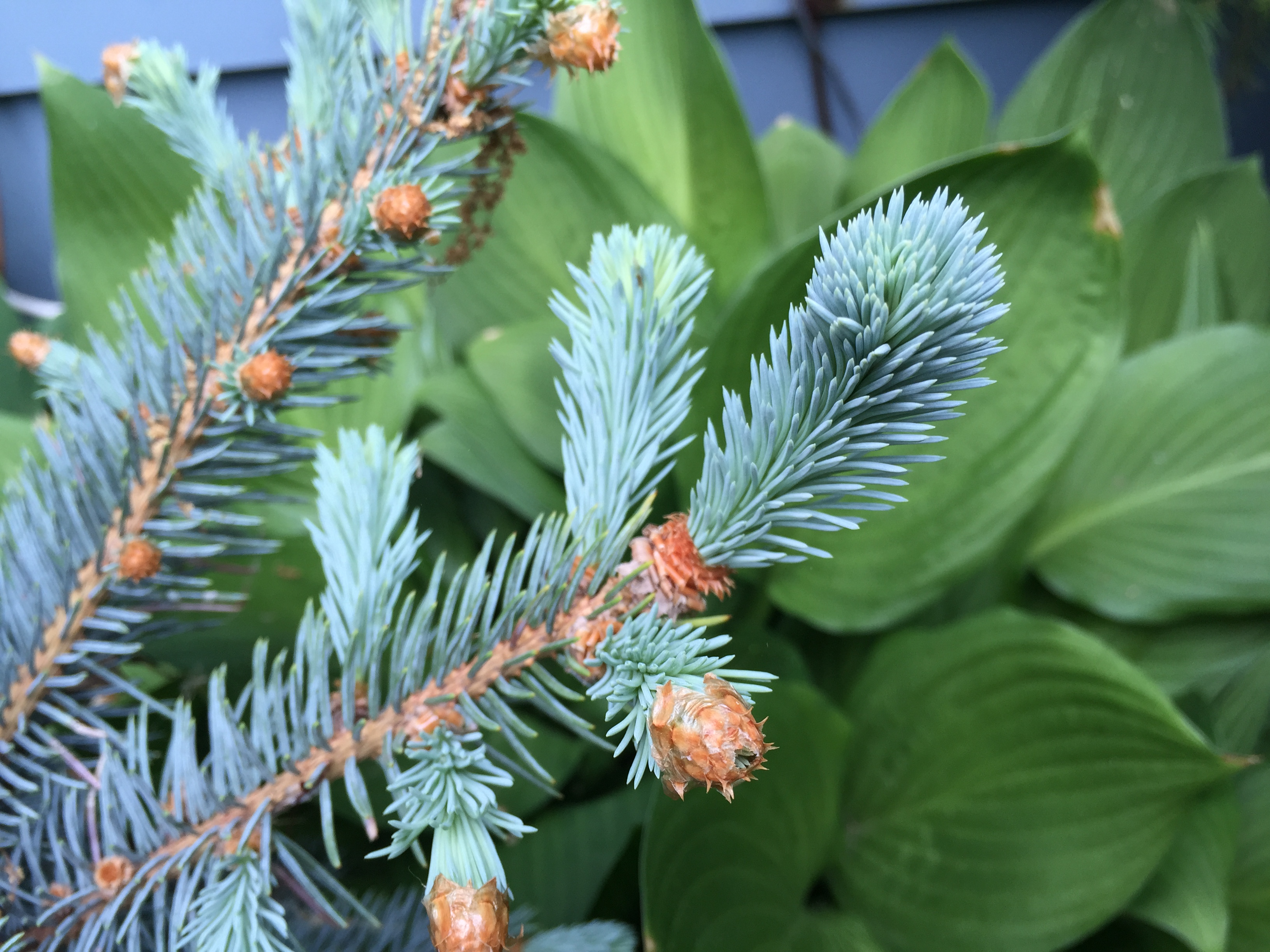
'Mission Blue' blue spruce new growth in spring

Picea pungens and its many cultivars are often grown as ornamental trees in gardens and parks. It is also grown for the Christmas tree industry. Though the blue spruce prefers moist soils, in particularly wet or rocky soils it will root very shallowly in the soil and will therefore be vulnerable to windthrow, being blown over in high winds, in exposed locations. It grows best in USDA growing zones 2 through 7, although when planted in zone 7 it has a hard time coping with high temperatures during the night.

Common cultivars (those marked agm have gained the Royal Horticultural Society's Award of Garden Merit):

- 'Baby Blue Eyes', 'Baby Blueeyes', or 'Baby Blueyes' – This is a semi-dwarf cultivar that grows slowly, but may eventually reach 4.6–6.1 m (15–20 ft) in height. It has a pyramidal shape and holds its color well.
- 'Edith' agm – A small and slow growing tree that takes 20 to 50 years to reach a height of 2.5–4 m (8 ft 2 in – 13 ft 1 in) with a spread of 1.5–2.5 m. Its shape is conical.
- 'Fat Albert' agm – A symmetrical perfect cone reaching 2.5–4 m (8 ft 2 in – 13 ft 1 in) in height and spreading 1.5–2.5 m after about 10 to 20 years. When allowed to grow longer it can reach 15–20 m (49–66 ft). The needles are blue with less gray/silver tones and are softer than many other cultivars.
- 'Globosa' agm – shrub from 90–150 cm (3–5 ft) in height, though it takes 20–50 years to reach full size
- 'Hoopsii' agm – A full size variety with a dense pyramidal habit known for "excellent" silver-blue color of its foliage. It reaches 9.1–15.2 m (30–50 ft) tall when full grown.
- 'Koster' or 'Kosteri' – A medium sized conical cultivar that will reach 8–12 m (26–39 ft) tall with a spread of 2.5–4 m after 20 to 50 years. It was introduced to the plant trade in 1915, but became less popular by the 2000s due to grafted trees having unpredictable qualities.
- 'Montgomery' or 'R.H. Montgomery' – A slow growing dwarf variety. It will typically only grow 90–120 cm (3–4 ft) tall in eight years, but may eventually reach a height of over 2.4 m (8 ft). It has tightly packed branches and silvery-blue needles.
- 'Pendula' or 'Glauca Pendula' – A Cultivar with drooping branches, spreads to about 1.2–3.0 m (4–10 ft) wide by 0.6–1.8 meters (2–6 ft) tall. It often must be tied to a stake for many years to prevent it growing on the ground.
- 'Walnut Glen' or 'Goldie' – A cultivar that grows slowly to 1.5–1.8 m (4 ft 11 in – 5 ft 11 in), but can eventually reach 7–10 m (23–33 ft). It has cream colored new shoots in the spring that turn a more typical gray-blue. It requires shade in the morning to prevent being damaged by the sun and is also vulnerable to frost damage.

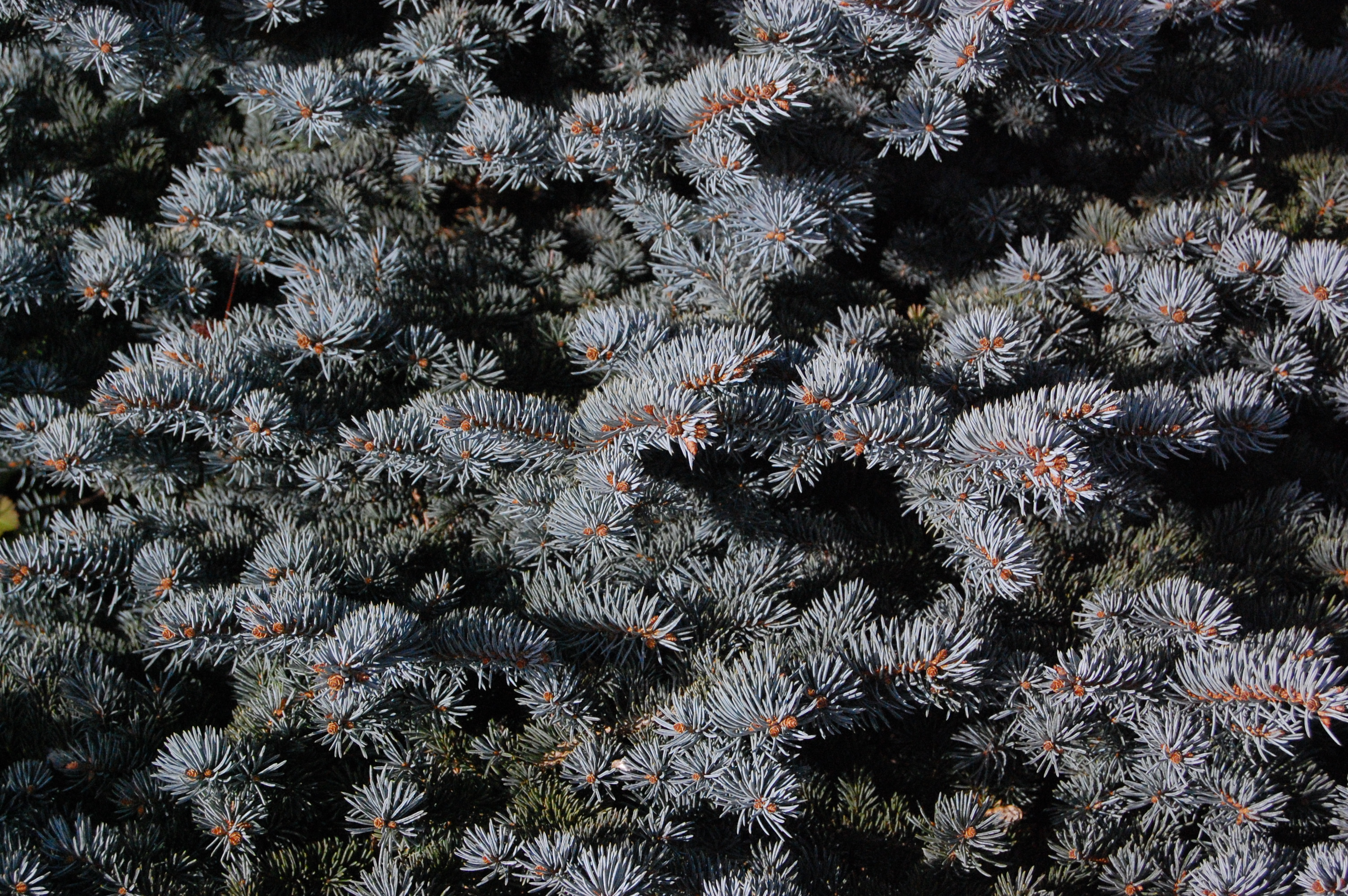
Foliage of the cultivar 'Globosa'

Blue spruce trees are used in windbreaks around gardens, fields, or farm structures. They are recommended for this use by extension services in Montana, North Dakota, Oregon, and Pennsylvania.

While in general broad leaved trees produce deeper and higher quality soils on mine reclamation sites, the blue spruce is among the best of the conifers. Though it is less tolerant of drought conditions than other trees such as the ponderosa pine. After 50 years on a reclaimed coal mine in Central Europe blue spruce trees formed organic soils with a depth of 4 cm.

The wood of the blue spruce is very infrequently used due to being brittle and with an excessive number of knots as well as being a less common tree. It has only 65% of the bending strength of the European spruce (Picea abies).

== Culture ==
In the traditions of the Acoma and Laguna pueblos, the western Keres people, the blue spruce is used as a treatment for rheumatism and the common cold. The needles are infused in hot water and the patient bathes in it. It was also used in ceremonies where dancers would have spruce twigs attached to their arms. Audience members would take parts of these twigs to steep and drink for stomach health. During the Navajo Chant of the Sun's House branches of Douglas-fir and blue spruce are used. They also traditionally use very ripe fruit of the plains pricklypear (Opuntia polyacantha) with the addition of a handful of the bark or roots of blue spruce to make a dye to color wool pink.

The blue spruce is the state tree of Colorado. It officially became Colorado's state tree on 7 March 1939 when House Joint Resolution 7 was enacted by the legislature. Previously a vote of the state's school children was taken on Arbor Day in 1892 expressing their preference for the blue spruce as the state tree.

From 1933 until 2014 the blue spruce was also the state tree of Utah. It was replaced by the quaking aspen because the aspen is a great deal more common than the blue spruce in Utah, making up 10% of the state's tree cover.

It is moderately popular as a Christmas tree in the United States and has been used as the Capitol Christmas Tree in Washington, D.C. four times since they began to be regularly erected in 1964.

== Gallery ==
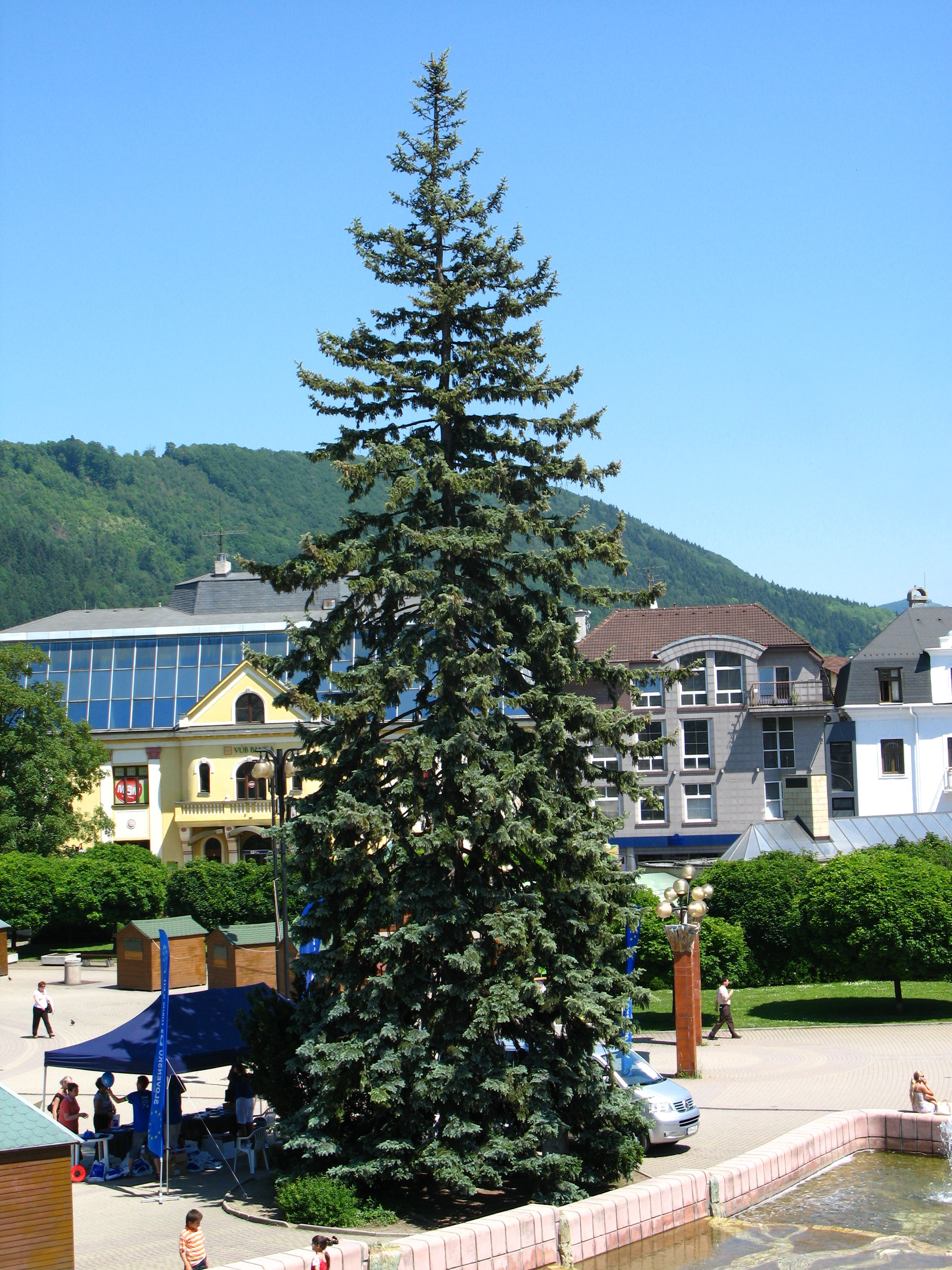
Mature tree

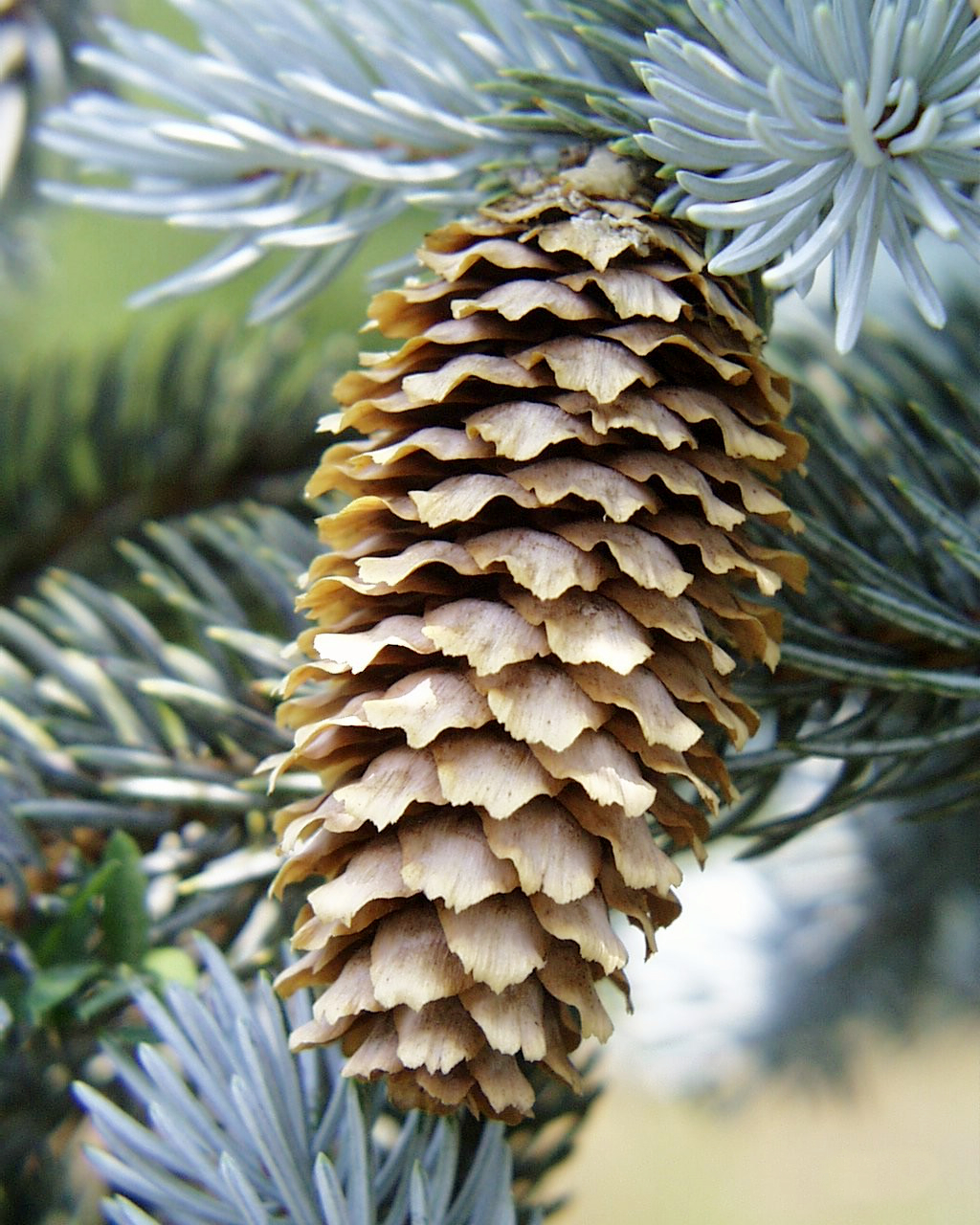
Mature cone

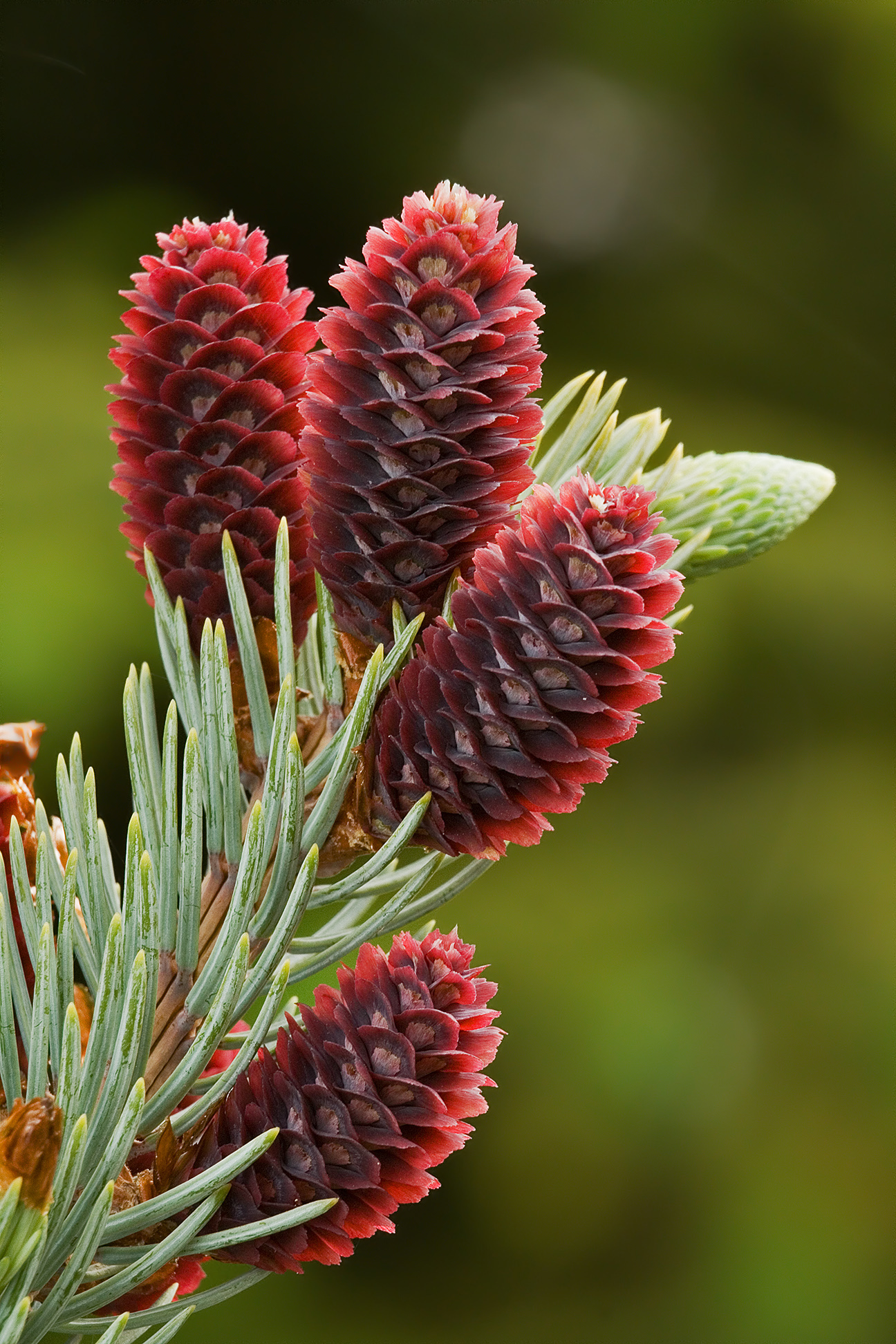
Immature cone

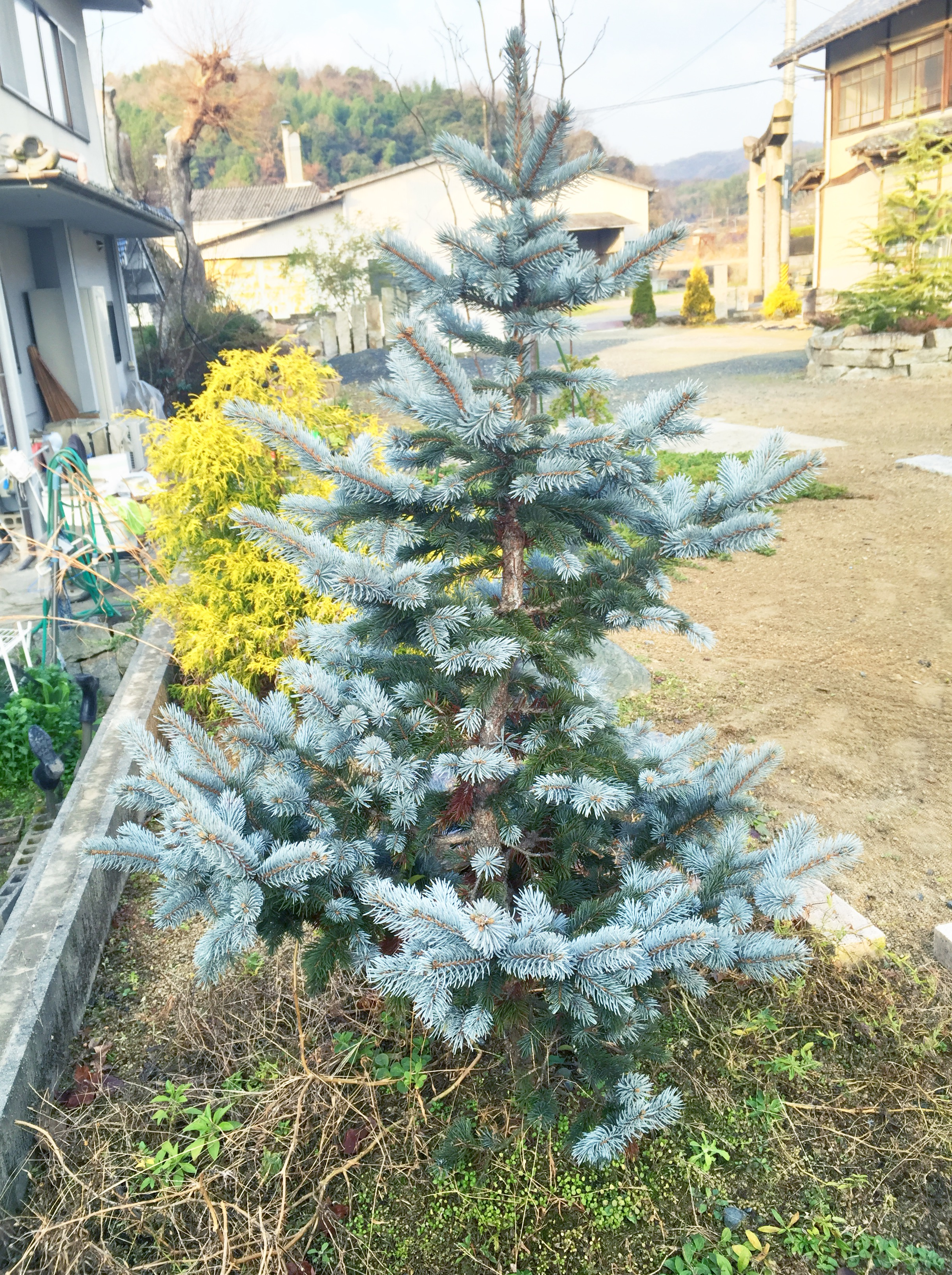
Hoopsii

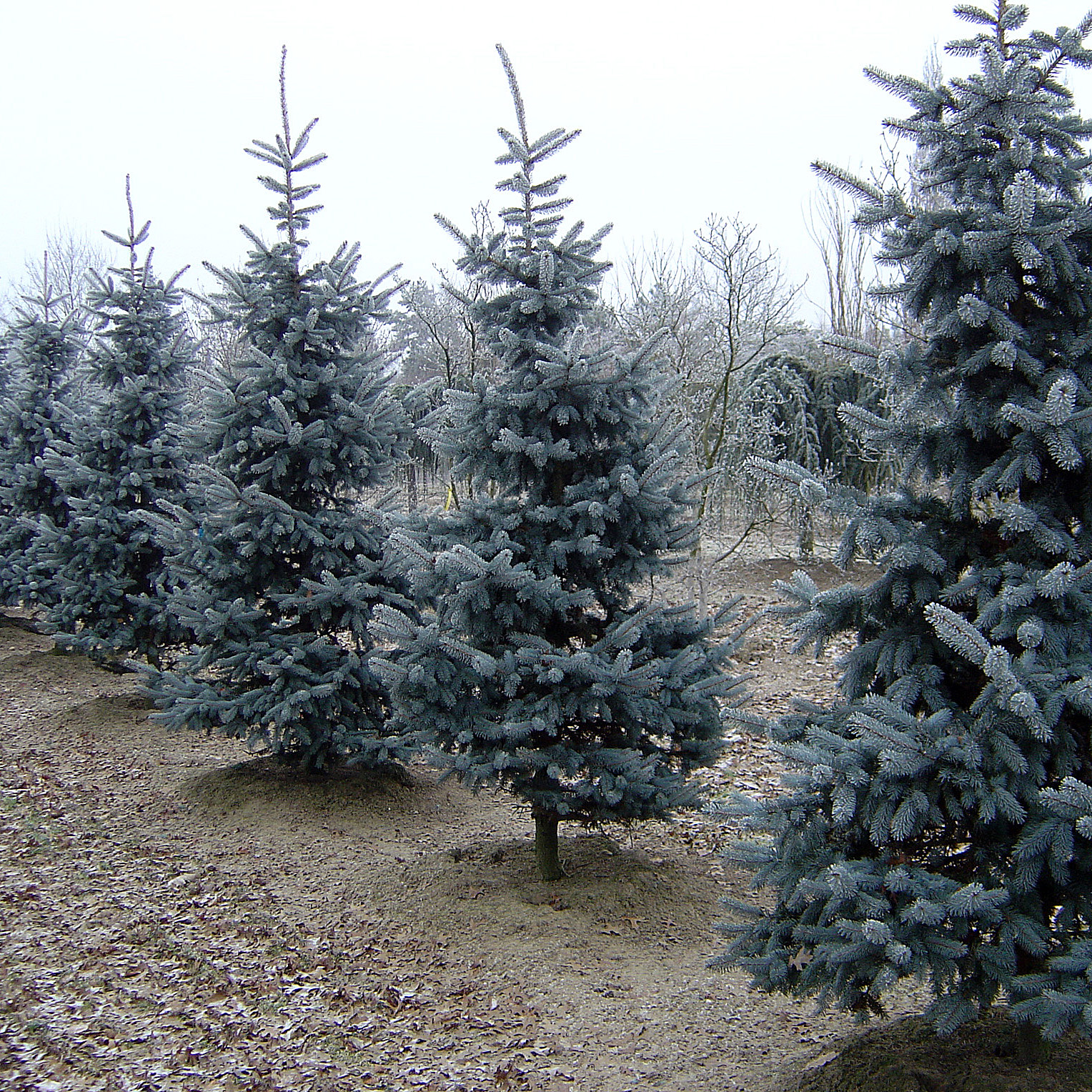
Koster

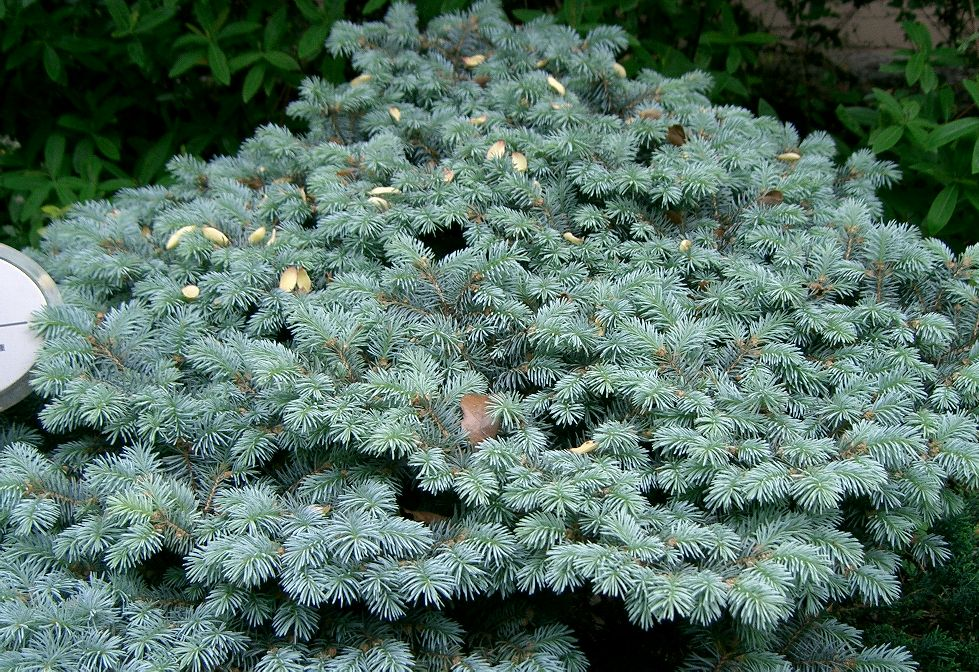
Globosa

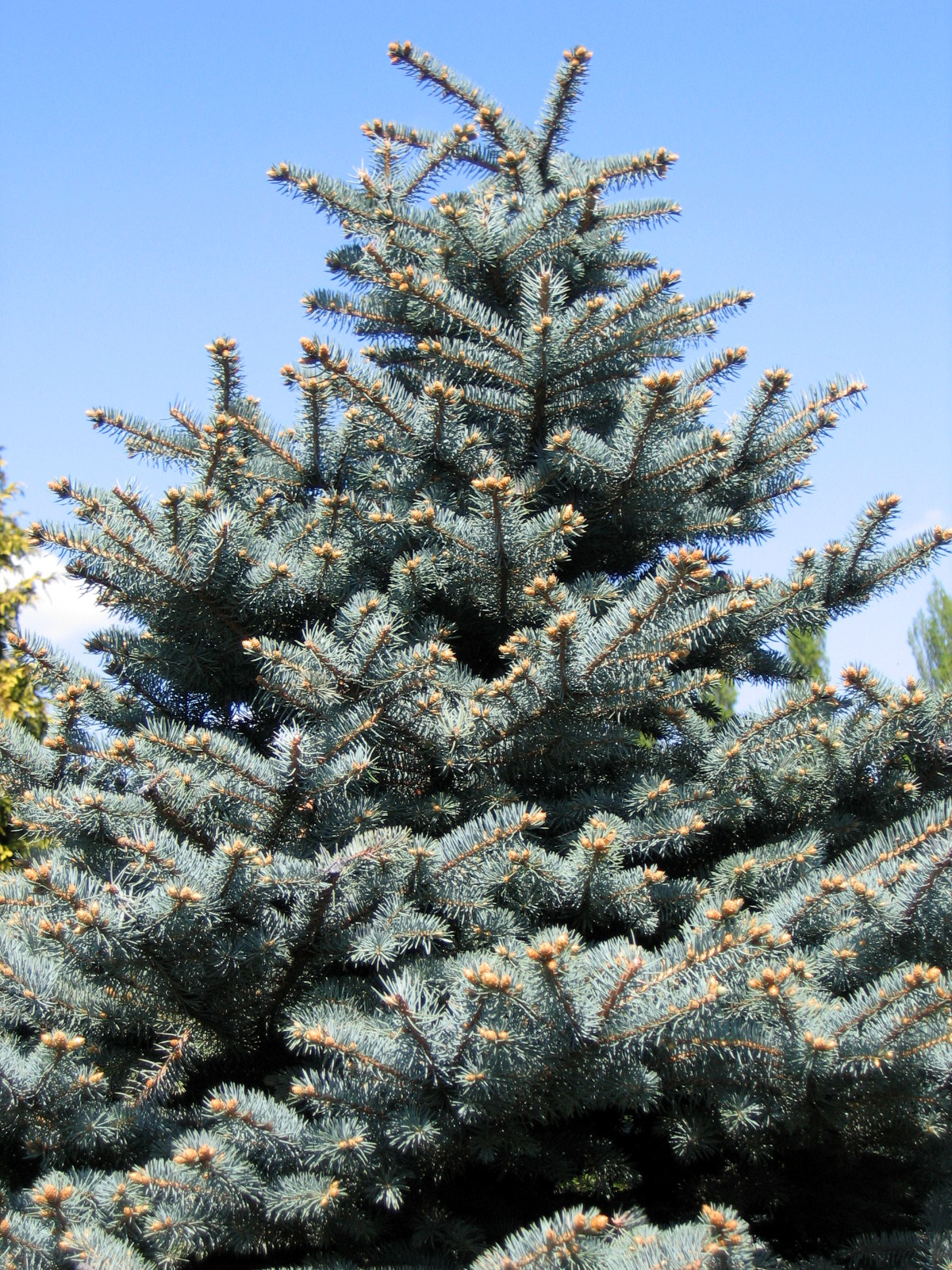
Montgomery

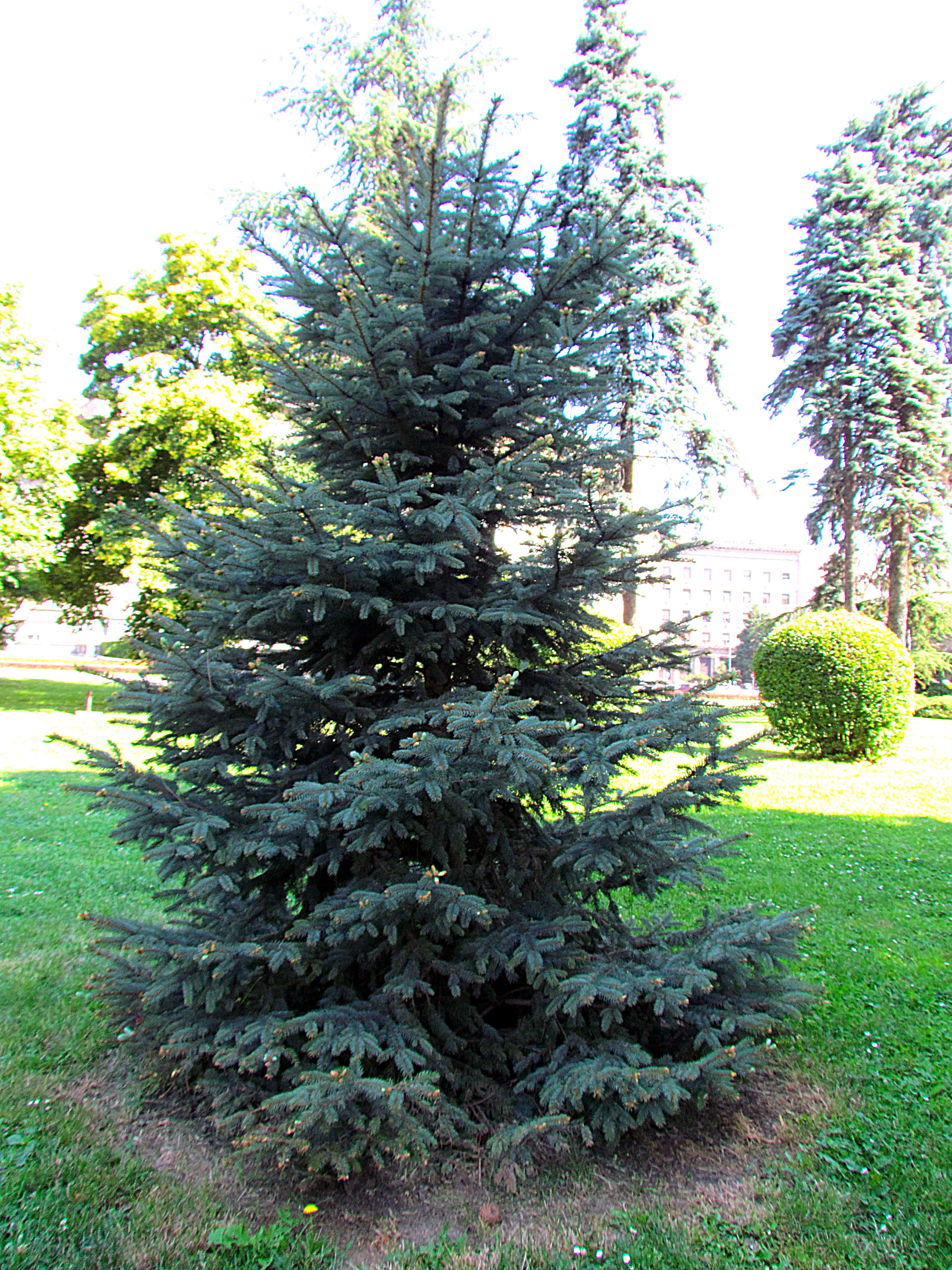
Fat Albert
