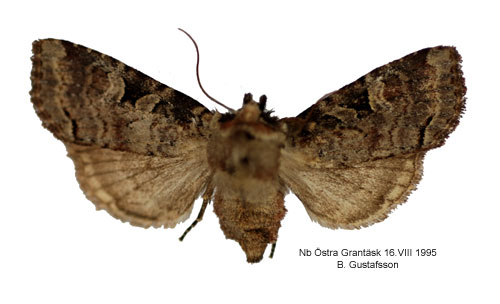

Scientific classification
- Domain: Eukaryota
- Kingdom: Animalia
- Phylum: Arthropoda
- Class: Insecta
- Order: Lepidoptera
- Superfamily: Noctuoidea
- Family: Noctuidae
- Subfamily: Noctuinae
- Genus: Hillia
- Species: H. iris

Binomial name
- Hillia iris (Zetterstedt, 1839)

= Hillia iris =

Species of moth

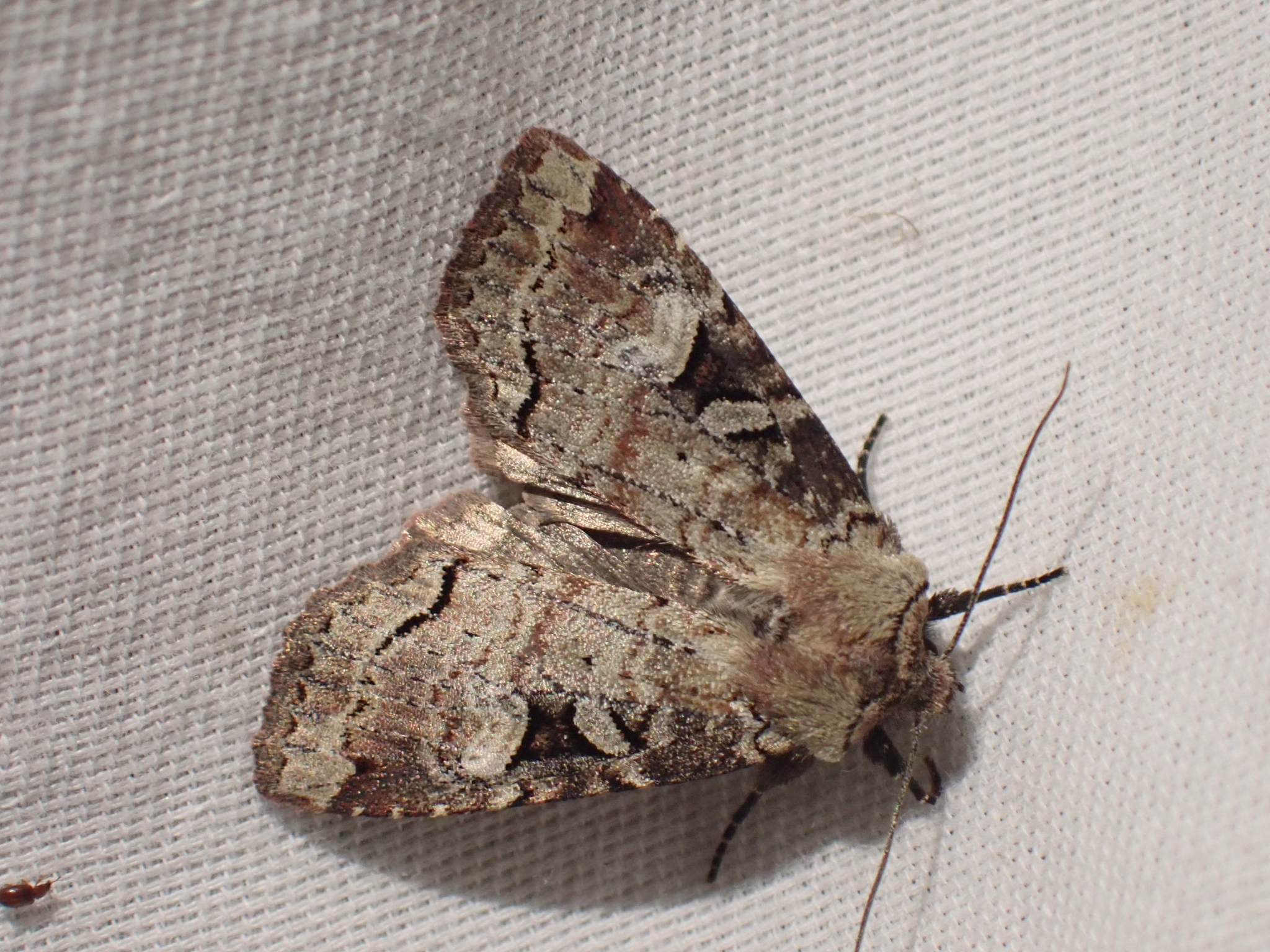
Hillia iris, Canada

Hillia iris, the iris rover, is a species of cutworm or dart moth in the family Noctuidae. It was described by Johan Wilhelm Zetterstedt in 1839 and is found in North America.

The MONA or Hodges number for Hillia iris is 9967.
