= Marian Storm =

American journalist and writer

- Born: January 30, 1892; Stormville, New York
- Died: August 20, 1975 (aged 83); Guadalajara
- Occupations: Journalist, writer

Marian Isabel Storm (January 30, 1892 – August 20, 1975) was an American writer, journalist, poet, animal rights advocate and conservationist.

== Biography ==
Storm was born in Stormville, New York. She was educated at Smith College and graduated in 1913. She worked as secretary to the Argentine Ambassador in Washington, D.C. (1917–1918). Storm was assistant editor for The Countryside Magazine (1915–1917) and was a reporter and freelance writer for the New York Evening Post (1918–1924) and the New York Tribune.

She moved to Mexico in the 1930s and wrote about Mexican culture and plant life. She contributed articles on Mexico and nature to leading magazines. She authored books on Mexican culture and history, natural history; animal rights, plant conservation and her travels in Central and South America, Caribbean and Europe.

Storm authored the first complete account in English of sixteenth-century saint Rose of Lima. It was positively reviewed in the Southwest Review as an "unusually interesting book, both for the wealth of curious facts it contains and for its sympathetic, thoughtful treatment of the leading character."

== Conservation ==
Storm was a conservationist and saved the Mexican shrub Ayuque from extinction. She was made an honorary member of the Sociedad de Mexico for her work. In 1941, Storm discovered the shrub and first brought it to the attention of botanist Professor Maximino Martínez who named it Balmea stormiae in her honour.

== Selected publications ==
- Minstrel Weather (1920)
- Prologue to Mexico (1931)
- Little Known Mexico: The Story of a Search for a Place (1932)
- The Life of Saint Rose (1937)
- Hoofways into Hot Country (1939)
- True Stories from Tarascan Places (1941)
- Enjoying Uruapan: A Book for Travelers in Michoacán (1945)
- Rights of Animals: An Appeal to Human Beings (1951)
- Poems of Sun and Snow (1955)
