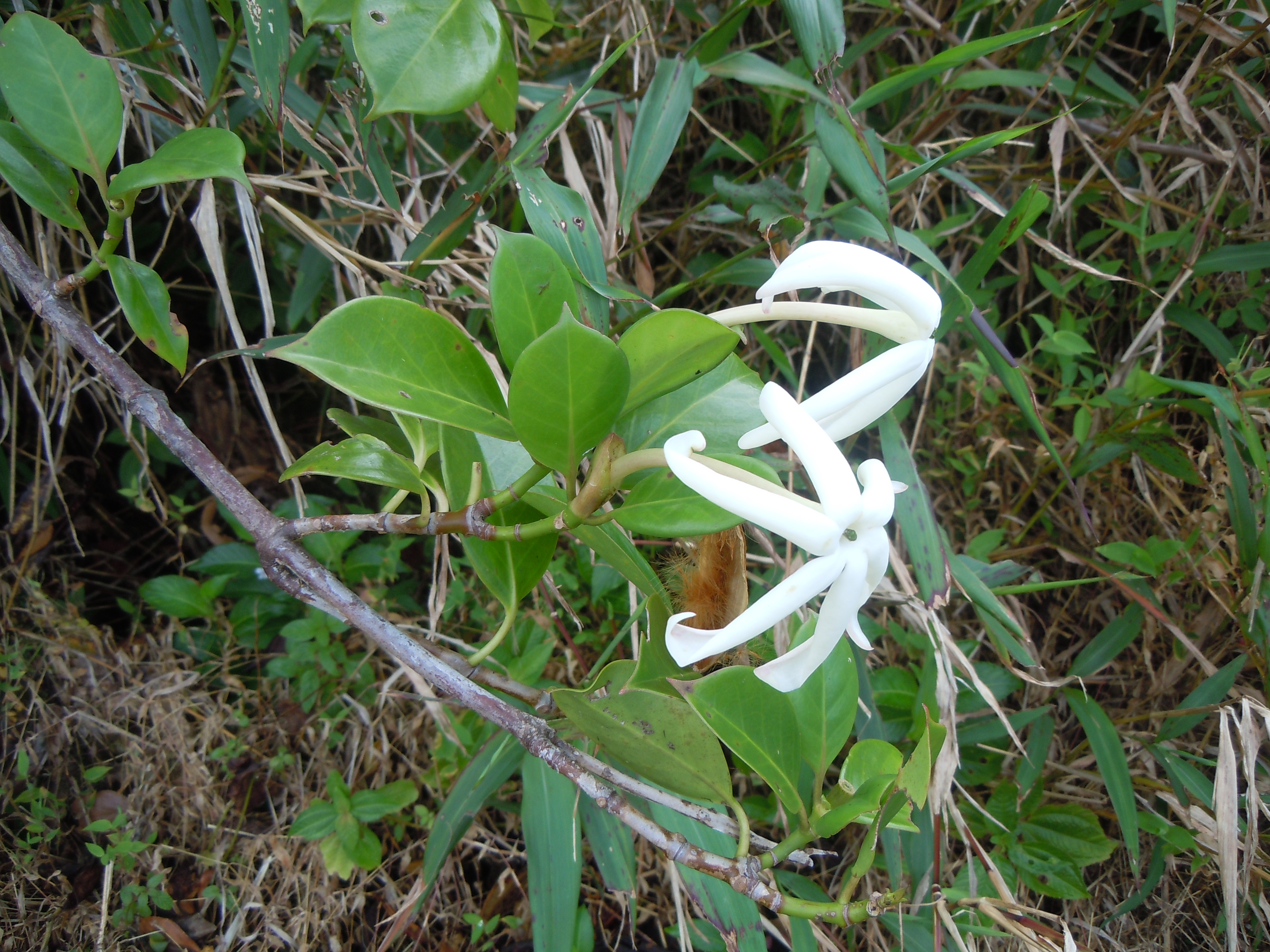
- Hillia parasitica

Scientific classification
- Kingdom: Plantae
- Clade: Tracheophytes
- Clade: Angiosperms
- Clade: Eudicots
- Clade: Asterids
- Order: Gentianales
- Family: Rubiaceae
- Subfamily: Cinchonoideae
- Genus: Hillia; Jacquin

Type species
- Hillia parasitica Jacquin

Species
- 24 species, see text.

Synonyms
- Ravnia Oersted

= Hillia (plant) =

Genus of plants

Hillia is a genus of flowering plants in the family Rubiaceae. It has 24 species, all of which are native to the Neotropics.

== Taxonomy ==
Hillia was named by Nicolaus Jacquin in 1760. It was named for the English botanist John Hill (1716–1775). Jacquin named only one species, Hillia parasitica. It has been suggested that the specific epithet as well as the generic name might well be a reference to John Hill.

Some authors have placed five of the species in a separate genus, Ravnia. A cladistic analysis of morphological characters found Ravnia to be embedded within Hillia. This hypothesis has not been tested with molecular data.

The genera Hillia, Balmea, and Cosmibuena form a monophyletic group. Some authors have designated this group as the tribe Hillieae, but it might be embedded within another tribe, Hamelieae.

== Species ==
The following species list may be incomplete or contain synonyms.

- Hillia macrophylla Standley
- Hillia parasitica Jacquin
- Hillia rivalis C.M. Taylor
- Hillia triflora (Oersted) C.M. Taylor

== Description ==
Most of the species are slightly succulent epiphytes or small trees. A few are subshrubs or lianas. Hillia rivalis is a rheophyte. The tissues of all the species contain raphides. The capsules have a beak-like appendage.

== Uses ==
Hillia triflora is cultivated as an ornamental plant.
