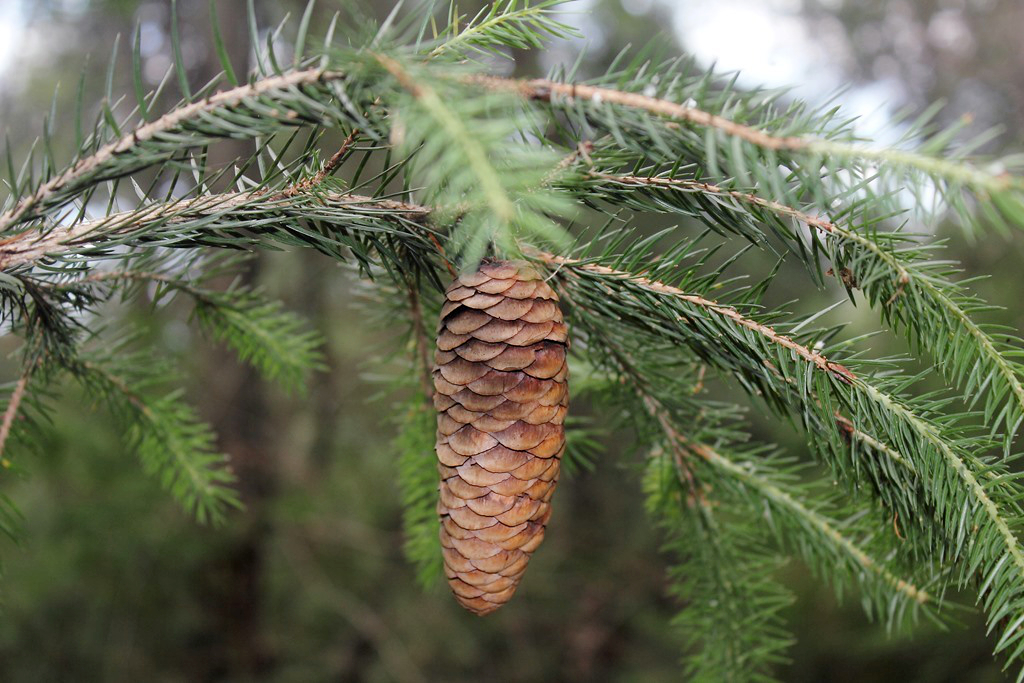
- At El Butano, Nuevo León, Mexico

Conservation status
- Endangered (IUCN 3.1)

Scientific classification
- Kingdom: Plantae
- Clade: Tracheophytes
- Clade: Gymnosperms
- Division: Pinophyta
- Class: Pinopsida
- Order: Pinales
- Family: Pinaceae
- Genus: Picea
- Species: P. martinezii

Binomial name
- Picea martinezii T.F.Patt.

= Picea martinezii =

Martinez spruce

Species of conifer

Picea martinezii, the Martinez's spruce, or Nuevo León spruce, is a medium-sized evergreen tree growing to 25–35 m tall, and with a trunk diameter of up to 1 m. It is native to northeast Mexico, where it occurs at six localities in the Sierra Madre Oriental mountains in Nuevo León. It grows at moderate altitudes from 2150–2600 m, growing along streamsides in mountain valleys, where moisture levels in the soil are greater than the otherwise low rainfall in the area would suggest.

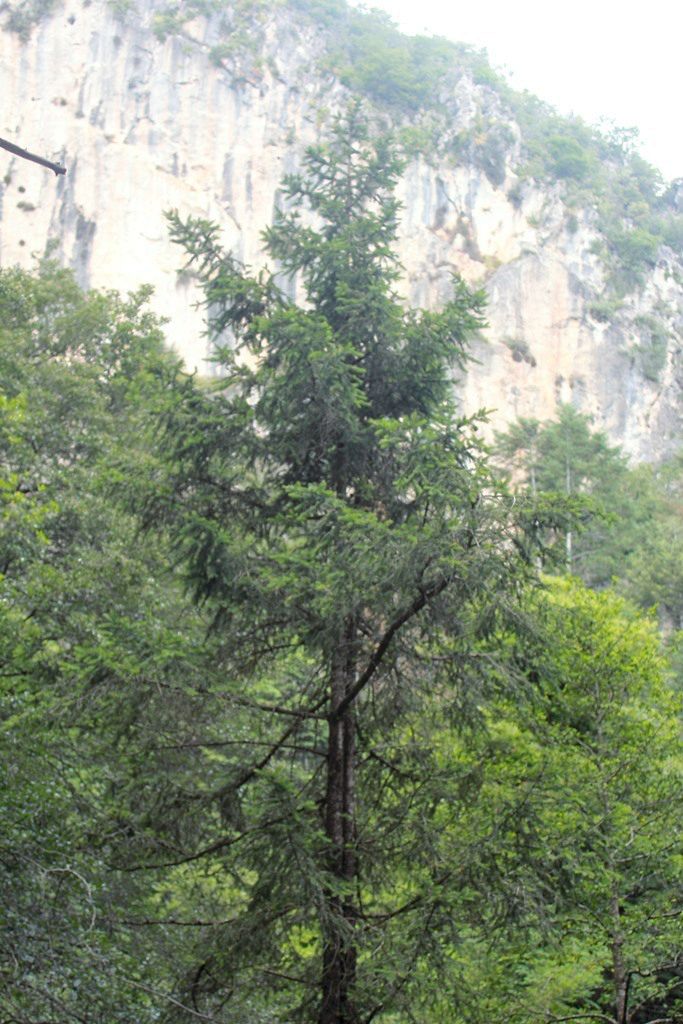
Tree at El Butano, Nuevo León, Mexico

The bark is thin and scaly, flaking off in small circular plates 5–10 cm across. The crown is conic, with widely spaced branches with drooping branchlets. The shoots are stout, pale buff-brown, glabrous, and with prominent pulvini. The leaves are needle-like, 23–35 mm long, stout, moderately flattened in cross-section (but unlike other spruces, flattened from side-to-side, not top-to-bottom), bright glossy green with inconspicuous lines of stomata; the tip is viciously sharp.

The cones are pendulous, broad cylindrical, 8.5–16 cm long (the largest of any North American spruce) and 3 cm broad when closed, opening to 6 cm broad. They have stiff, smoothly rounded scales 2-2.5 cm broad, and are green, maturing pale brown 6–8 months after pollination. The seeds are black, 4–8 mm long, with a 15–23 mm long pale brown wing.

Martinez's spruce was only discovered in 1981, and is endangered with just six small populations, comprising about 800 trees. Fossil evidence shows it had a wider distribution in the past, south to central Mexico. It is related to Chihuahua spruce from northwest Mexico, but differs in the longer, green leaves, and the larger, broader cones with larger scales. No other related spruces are found in North America, with its next-closest relatives in eastern Asia.

It is planted as an ornamental tree in botanical gardens, and is valued in warm areas as it is one of the most heat-tolerant of all spruces. It is named after the Mexican botanist Maximino Martínez.
