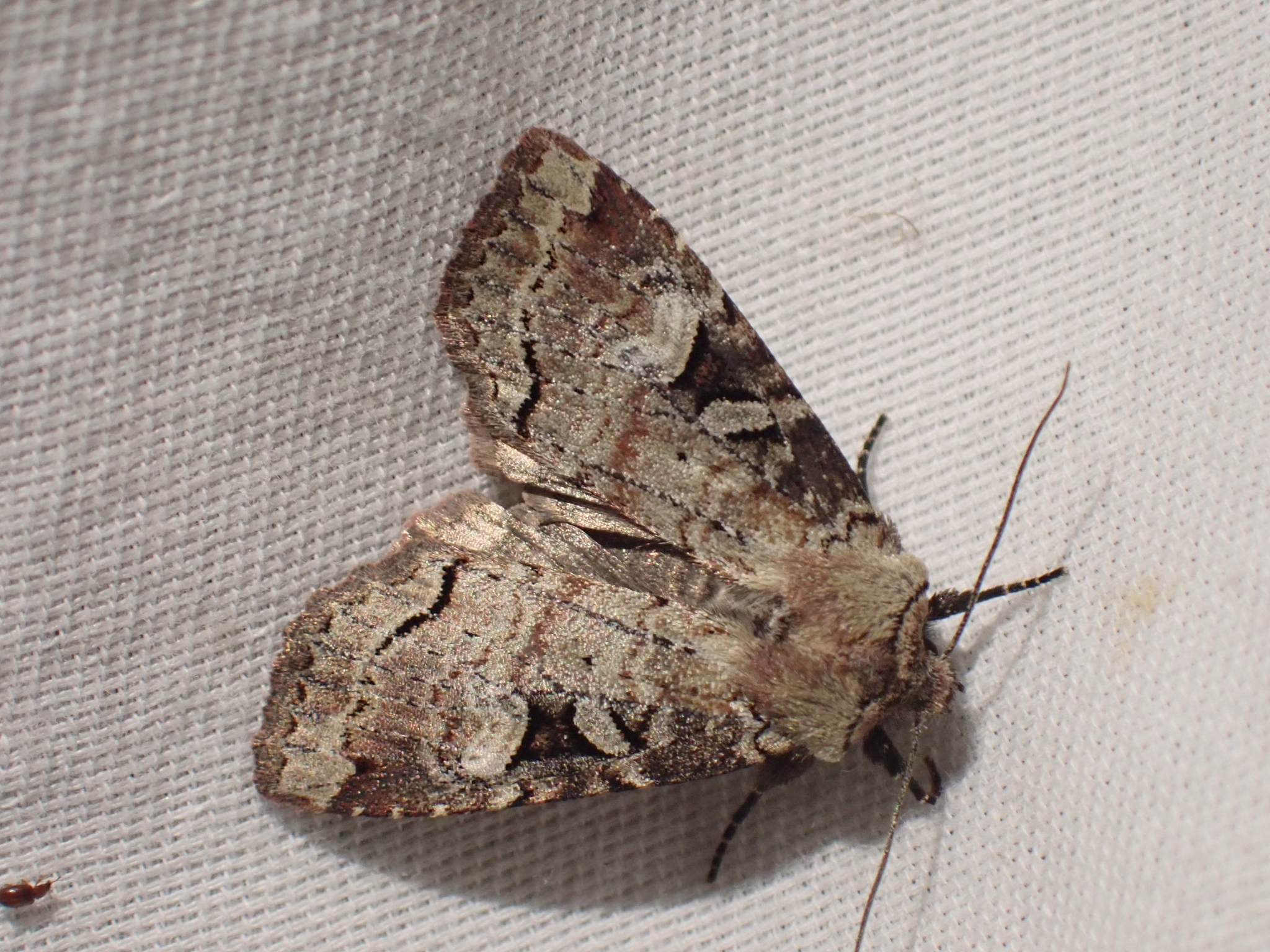
- Hillia iris, Canada

Scientific classification
- Kingdom: Animalia
- Phylum: Arthropoda
- Class: Insecta
- Order: Lepidoptera
- Superfamily: Noctuoidea
- Family: Noctuidae
- Subfamily: Noctuinae
- Genus: Hillia; Grote, 1883

= Hillia (moth) =

Genus of moths

Hillia is a genus of moths of the family Noctuidae.

== Species ==
- Hillia acronyctina Köhler, 1952
- Hillia iris (Zetterstedt, 1839)
- Hillia maida (Dyar, 1904)
- Hillia schildei
