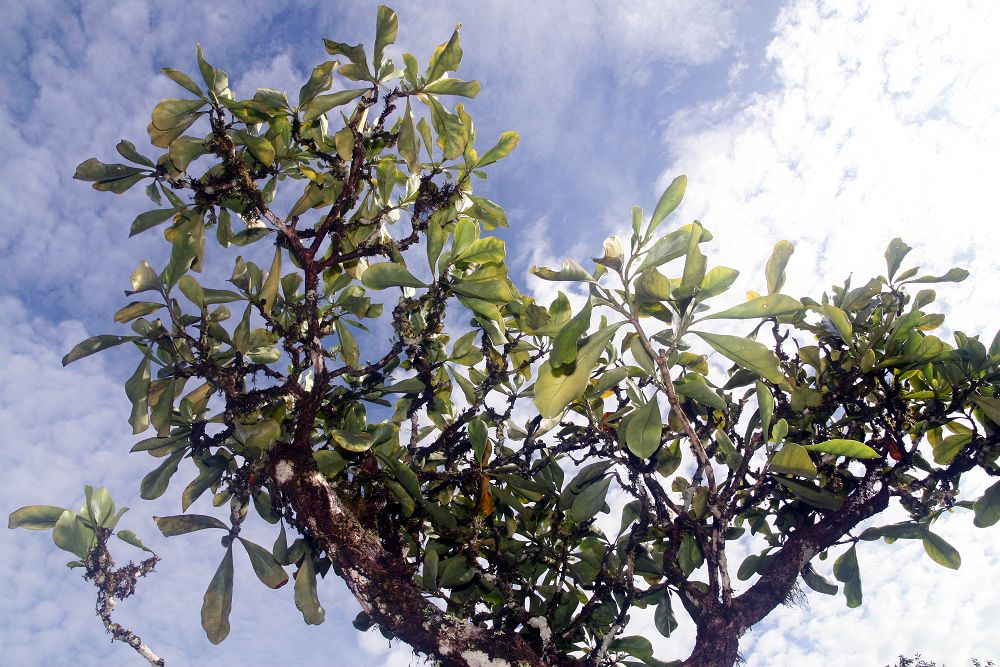
- Cosmibuena grandiflora

Scientific classification
- Kingdom: Plantae
- Clade: Embryophytes
- Clade: Tracheophytes
- Clade: Spermatophytes
- Clade: Angiosperms
- Clade: Eudicots
- Clade: Asterids
- Order: Gentianales
- Family: Rubiaceae
- Subfamily: Cinchonoideae
- Tribe: Hillieae
- Genus: Cosmibuena; Ruiz & Pav.

Type species
- Cosmibuena obtusifolia Ruiz & Pav.

Synonyms
- Buena Pohl

= Cosmibuena =

Genus of plants

Cosmibuena is a genus of flowering plants in the family Rubiaceae. The genus is native to Chiapas, Central America, and South America as far south as Brazil.

These are succulent shrubs and trees, often growing as epiphytes. The leaves are oppositely arranged. The inflorescence is a terminal cluster or sometimes a solitary flower. The flowers are large, showy, and fragrant. They are white, fading yellow. They open at night and dry out and die the next day. The fruit is a woody capsule containing papery winged seeds.

These plants grow in wet lowlands, mountain forests, and mangroves.

== Species ==
Four species are recognized as of May 2014:

- Cosmibuena grandiflora (Ruiz & Pav.) Rusby - Costa Rica, Nicaragua, Panama, Guyana, Suriname, Venezuela, Bolivia, Colombia, Ecuador, Peru, Brazil
- Cosmibuena macrocarpa (Benth.) Klotzsch ex Walp. - Costa Rica, Nicaragua, Panama, Colombia, Ecuador
- Cosmibuena matudae (Standl.) L.O.Williams - Chiapas, El Salvador, Guatemala, Honduras, Nicaragua
- Cosmibuena valerioi (Standl.) C.M.Taylor - Costa Rica, Panama
