= Maximino Martínez =

Mexican botanist (1888-1964)

- Born: 30 May 1888; San Miguel Regla, Hidalgo, Mexico
- Died: 2 June 1964 (aged 76); Mexico City, Mexico
- Scientific career
- Fields: Botany

Maximino Martínez y Martínez (Note: In this Mexican name, the surname is Martínez and the second or maternal family name is Martínez.) (30 May 1888 – 2 June 1964) was a Mexican botanist who specialised in Mexican conifers.

He described many new species of fir, pine and spruce between 1939 and 1961, though in several cases these proved to be synonyms of earlier names published in obscure 19th century English and German literature, due to his inability to access British and German herbaria and libraries during the Second World War; thus his species Pinus michoacana, published in 1944, eventually proved to be the same species as Pinus devoniana described by John Lindley in 1839.

Species named after him include Picea martinezii, Pinus maximartinezii, and Pinus maximinoi.
