= Tuft =

Tuft or tufts or tufted can refer to:

== Biology ==
- Tufted grass, grasses growing in tussocks
- Fascicle (botany), or tuft, a bundle of leaves or flowers growing closely together
- specific tufts of feathers on a bird, for example a pectoral tuft
- Ungual tufts, groups of hairs at the base of an animal's claws
  - Toe tuft, on cats
- Ear tuft, fur or feathers around an animal's ear
- Enamel tufts, in teeth
- Tuft cell, in the intestines
- Sulphur tuft, or Hypholoma fasciculare, a mushroom
- Sheathed woodtuft, or Kuehneromyces mutabilis, a mushroom

== Other uses ==
- Tufting in textiles
- Tuft (aeronautics), a strip of string attached to an aircraft
- Tuft, a decorative tassel on a hat
- Tufting (composites) in the field of advanced composite materials
- Tuft (surname)

== See also ==
- Toft (disambiguation)
- Tofte (disambiguation)
- Tufts (disambiguation)
- Tuff, a type of rock
- Fascicle (disambiguation)
