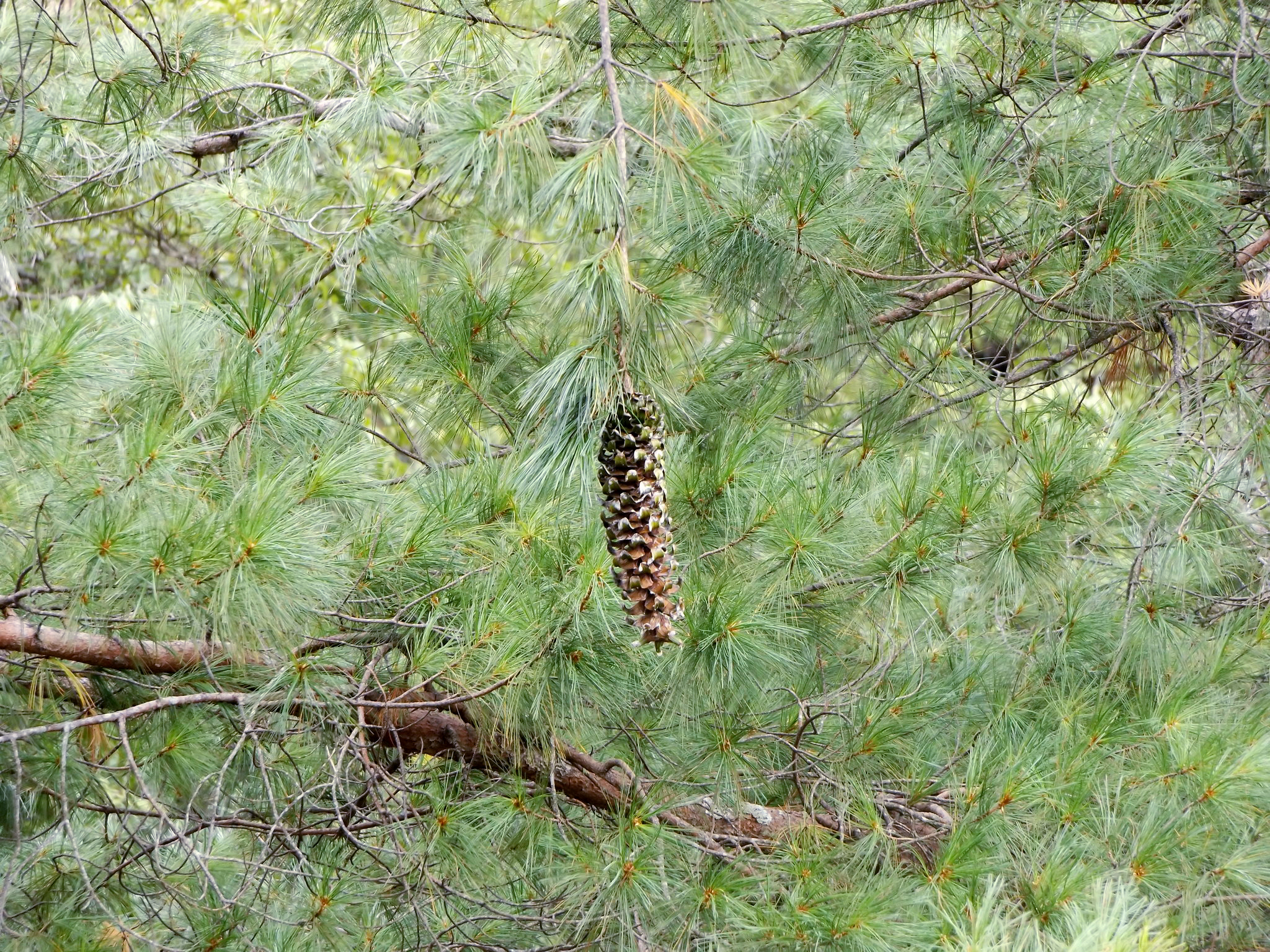
- Pinus strobiformis in Jalisco, Mexico

Conservation status
- Least Concern (IUCN 3.1)

- Secure (NatureServe)

Scientific classification
- Kingdom: Plantae
- Clade: Embryophytes
- Clade: Tracheophytes
- Clade: Gymnosperms
- Division: Pinophyta
- Class: Pinopsida
- Order: Pinales
- Family: Pinaceae
- Genus: Pinus
- Subgenus: P. subg. Strobus
- Section: P. sect. Quinquefoliae
- Subsection: P. subsect. Strobus
- Species: P. strobiformis

Binomial name
- Pinus strobiformis Engelm.
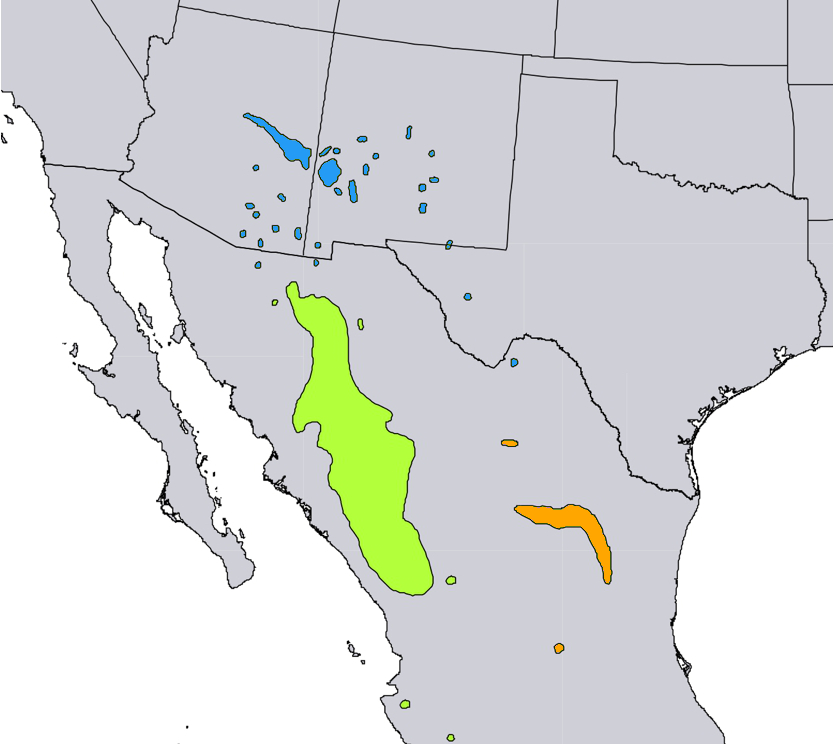
- Natural range (green), with the closely related Pinus stylesii (orange), and Pinus reflexa (blue)

Synonyms
- Pinus ayacahuite var. strobiformis (Engelm.) Lemmon; Pinus ayacahuite var. brachyptera Shaw; Pinus ayacahuite var. novogaliciana Carvajal

= Pinus strobiformis =

Species of conifer

Pinus strobiformis, also known as Chihuahua white pine, is a medium-sized white pine tree endemic to western Mexico in the Sierra Madre Occidental mountain range. It is typically a high-elevation pine growing mixed with other conifers in montane forest. It was formerly considered conspecific with Pinus reflexa (southwestern white pine) of the southwestern United States and Pinus stylesii of northeastern Mexico, but is now treated as distinct from these.

== Description ==
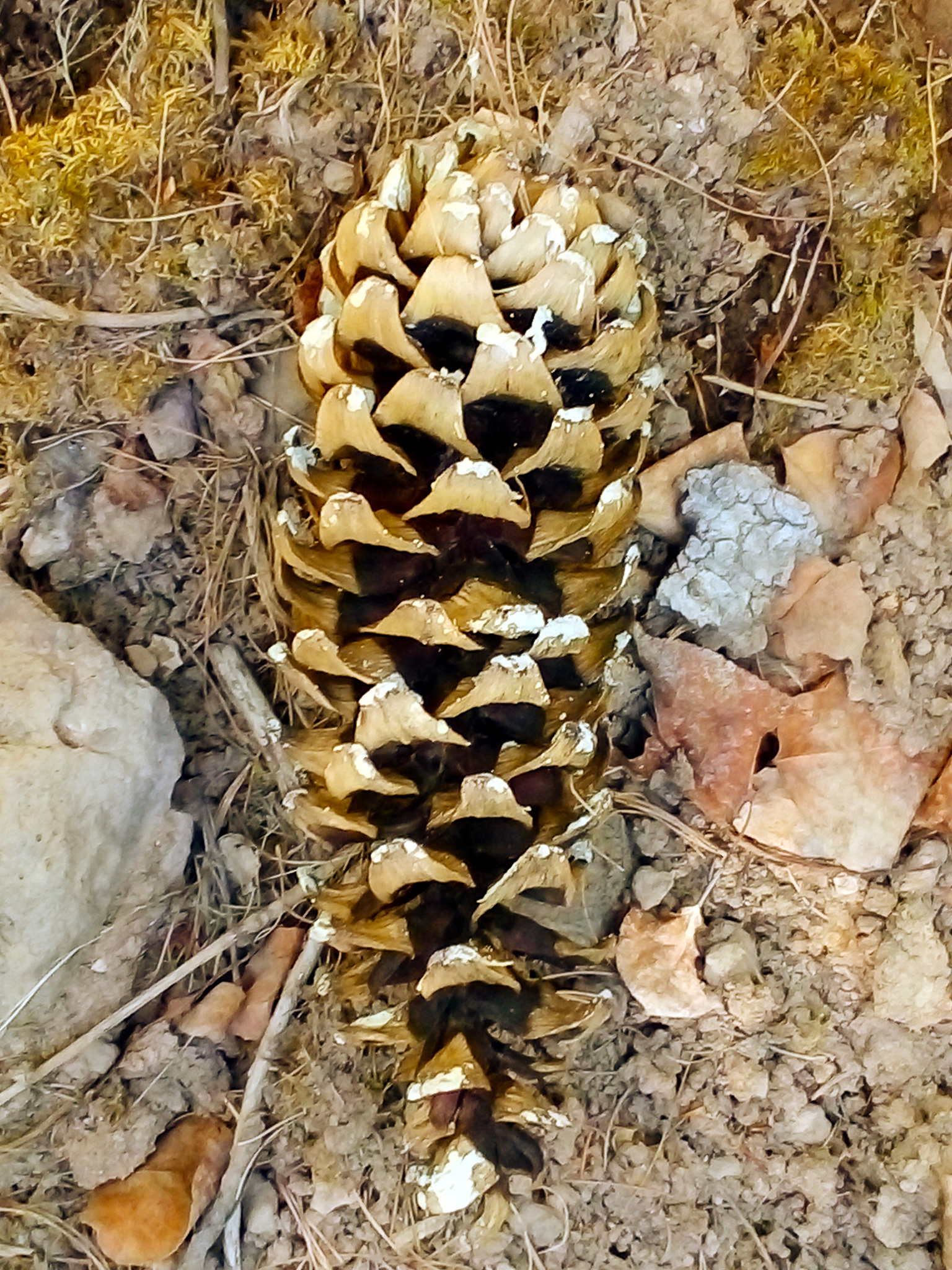
Cone, at Madera, Chihuahua, Mexico

Pinus strobiformis, a member of the white pine group, Pinus subgenus Strobus, is a straight, slender tree growing to 30 metres (98 ft) (rarely 40 metres (130 ft)) tall and 1 metre (3 ft 3 in) in diameter. The bark is smooth and silvery-grey on young trees, aging to furrowed and red-brown or dark grey-brown. The branches are spreading and ascending. The twigs are slender, pale red-brown, aging to smooth grey or grey-brown. The buds are ellipsoid, red-brown, and resinous. The leaves (needles) are five per bundle (fascicle), spreading, 8–14 cm long, 0.6-1.0 mm in diameter, straight, slightly twisted, pliant, dark green to blue-green, and persist 3–5 years. The upper surfaces (adaxial, facing the centre of the fascicle) is conspicuously whitened by narrow stomatal lines. The lower surfaces (abaxial, the outer face away from the centre of the leaf fascicle) are without evident stomatal lines. The margins are sharp, razorlike and finely serrulate, apex narrowly acute to short-subulate. Each fascicle has a deciduous sheath 1.5-2.0 cm long which is shed early.

The cones are very large, 16–50 cm long and 9–11 cm broad, and have scales with a very characteristic prolonged and often recurved or S-shaped apex. The seeds are large, and with a very short wing; they are dispersed mainly by birds, particularly the Mexican jay.

== Distribution ==
It is native to Mexico in the Sierra Madre Occidental mountains, from a short distance south of the US–Mexico border south through Chihuahua and Durango to Jalisco. The pine rarely appears in pure strands, but grows along with other native conifers, such as Durango pine Pinus durangensis, Arizona pine Pinus arizonica, American aspen Populus tremuloides, Durango fir Abies durangensis, Douglas-fir Pseudotsuga menziesii, and the Mexican subspecies of Engelmann's spruce Picea engelmannii subsp. mexicana. It is a drought tolerant tree but greater populations grow on moist and cool places living in association with other pines.

== Ecology ==
Two species of dwarf mistletoe exclusively parasitize Pinus reflexa in southeastern Arizona, southern New Mexico, and the Sierra del Carmen in northern Mexico, namely Arceuthobium apachecum and Arceuthobium blumeri. Both species sometimes induce witch's brooms, and heavily-infected stands have mortality rates up to 30 times higher than uninfected stands.
