= Tufts (surname) =

Tufts is a surname. Notable people with the surname include:

- Bob Tufts (1955–2019), American baseball player
- Charles Tufts (1781–1876), American businessman and philanthropist
- Daryn Tufts (born 1973), American writer, director, producer, and actor
- Eleanor Tufts (1927–1991), American art historian
- Glenn Tufts (born 1954), American baseball player, manager, and scout
- Henry Tufts (1748–1831), American criminal
- James Tufts (1829–1884), American politician
- James Hayden Tufts (1862–1942), American philosopher
- James Walker Tufts (1835–1902), American businessman
- John Tufts (music educator) (1689–1750), colonial American music educator
- John Q. Tufts (1840–1908), American politician
- Nathan A. Tufts (1879–1952), American lawyer and politician
- Otis Tufts (1804–1869), American inventor
- Patrick Tufts, American computer scientists
- Peter Tufts (1617–1700), colonial American landowner
- Richard Tufts (1896–1980), American golf administrator
- Robert Tufts (disambiguation), multiple people
- Sean Tufts (born 1982), American football player
- Sonny Tufts (1911–1970), American actor
- Terry Tufts (born 1954), Canadian singer-songwriter
- Warren Tufts (1925–1982), American comics artist and writer

== See also ==
- Tuft (surname)
- Tufte, surname
- Toft (disambiguation), include a list of people with surname Toft
- Tofte (disambiguation), includes a list of people with surname Tofte
