= Tuft (surname) =

Tuft is a surname. Notable people with the name include:

- Arne Tuft (1911-1989), Norwegian cross country skier
- Gabbi Tuft or Tyler Reks (born 1978), American wrestler
- Svein Tuft (born 1977), bicycle racer

== See also ==
- Toft (disambiguation), include a list of people with surname Toft
- Tofte (disambiguation), includes a list of people with surname Tofte
- Tufte, surname
- Tufts (surname)
