= Tufts (disambiguation) =

Tufts University is a private research university in Medford and Somerville, Massachusetts, U.S.

Tufts may also refer to:

- Tufts Medical Center, hospital
- Tufts (surname)

== See also ==
- Tuft (disambiguation)
