= Robert Tufts (disambiguation) =

Robert Tufts (born 1955) is an American former baseball pitcher.

Robert Tufts may also refer to:

- Robert Tufts (politician) (born 2009), American mayor of Dorset, Minnesota
- Robert Tufts, co-writer NSC 68

== See also ==
- Tufts (surname)
- Robert (disambiguation)
