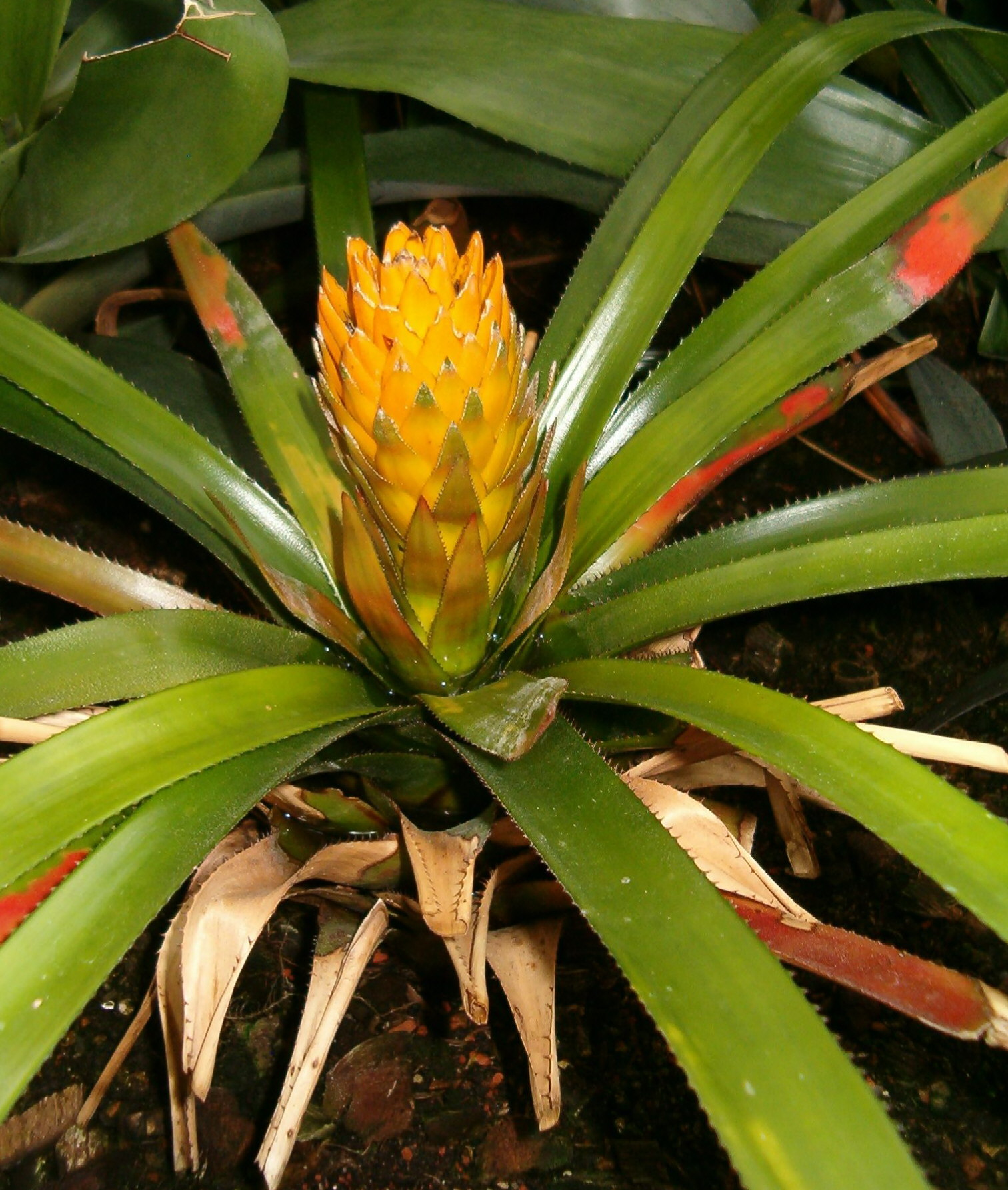

Conservation status
- Vulnerable (IUCN 3.1)

Scientific classification
- Kingdom: Plantae
- Clade: Tracheophytes
- Clade: Angiosperms
- Clade: Monocots
- Clade: Commelinids
- Order: Poales
- Family: Bromeliaceae
- Genus: Aechmea
- Species: A. biflora

Binomial name
- Aechmea biflora (L.B.Sm.) L.B.Sm. & M.A.Spencer

Synonyms
- Streptocalyx biflorus L.B.Sm.

= Aechmea biflora =

Species of flowering plant

Aechmea biflora is a species of flowering plant in the family Bromeliaceae. It is an epiphyte endemic to Ecuador. Its natural habitat is tropical eastern Andean lower montane rain forest from 1,000 to 1,500 metres elevation. The species name means "2-flowered," referring to two flowers in each fascicle.

== Cultivars ==
- × Neomea 'Buchanan's Nebula'
- × Neomea 'Caldera'
- × Neomea 'Chiriqui'
- × Neomea 'Light Years'
- × Neomea 'Mars Rising'
- × Neomea 'Mundillo'
- × Neomea 'Solar Flare'
- × Nidumea 'Kathleen'
- × Nidumea 'Pepe'
