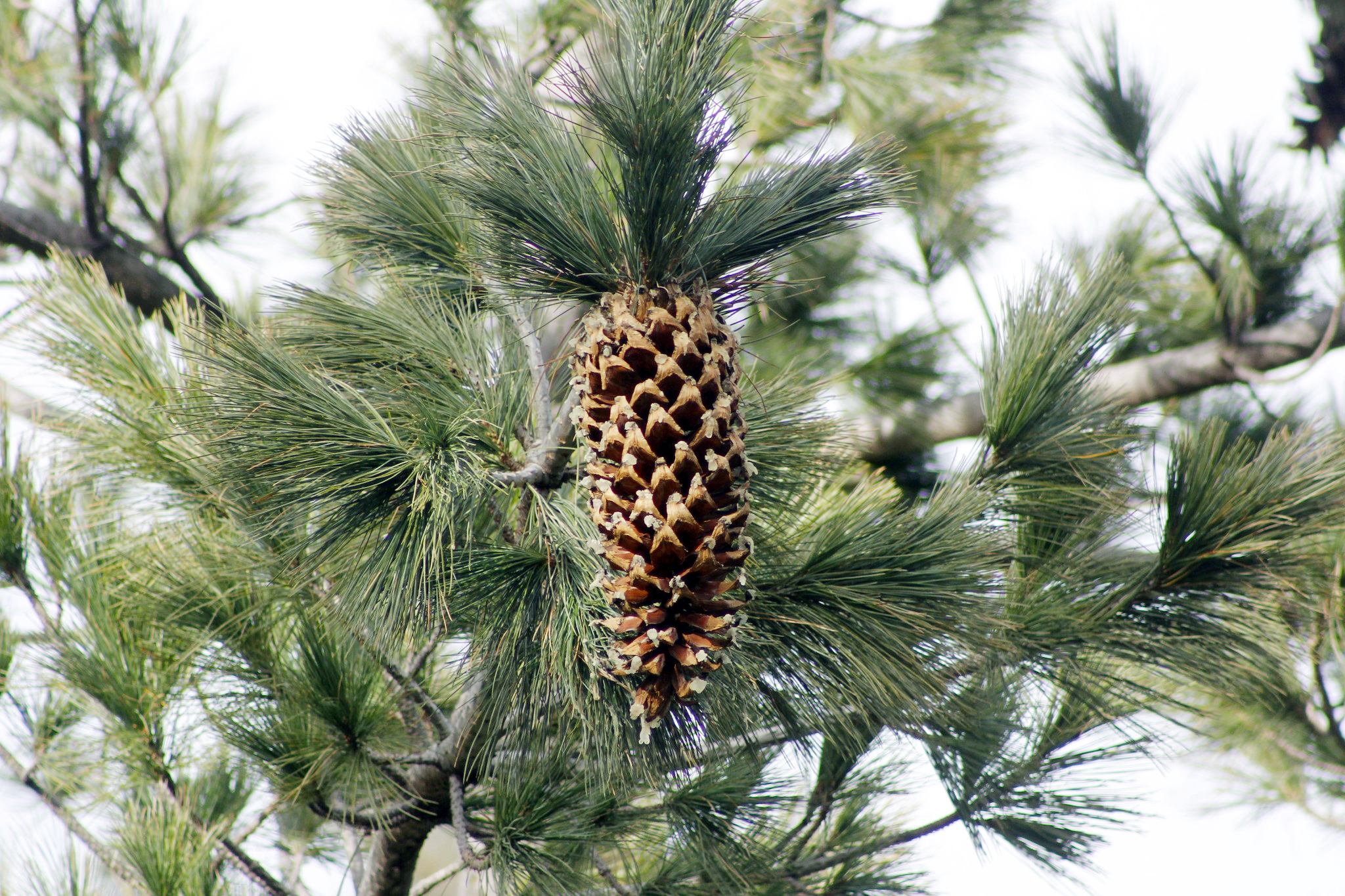
- Cone and needles
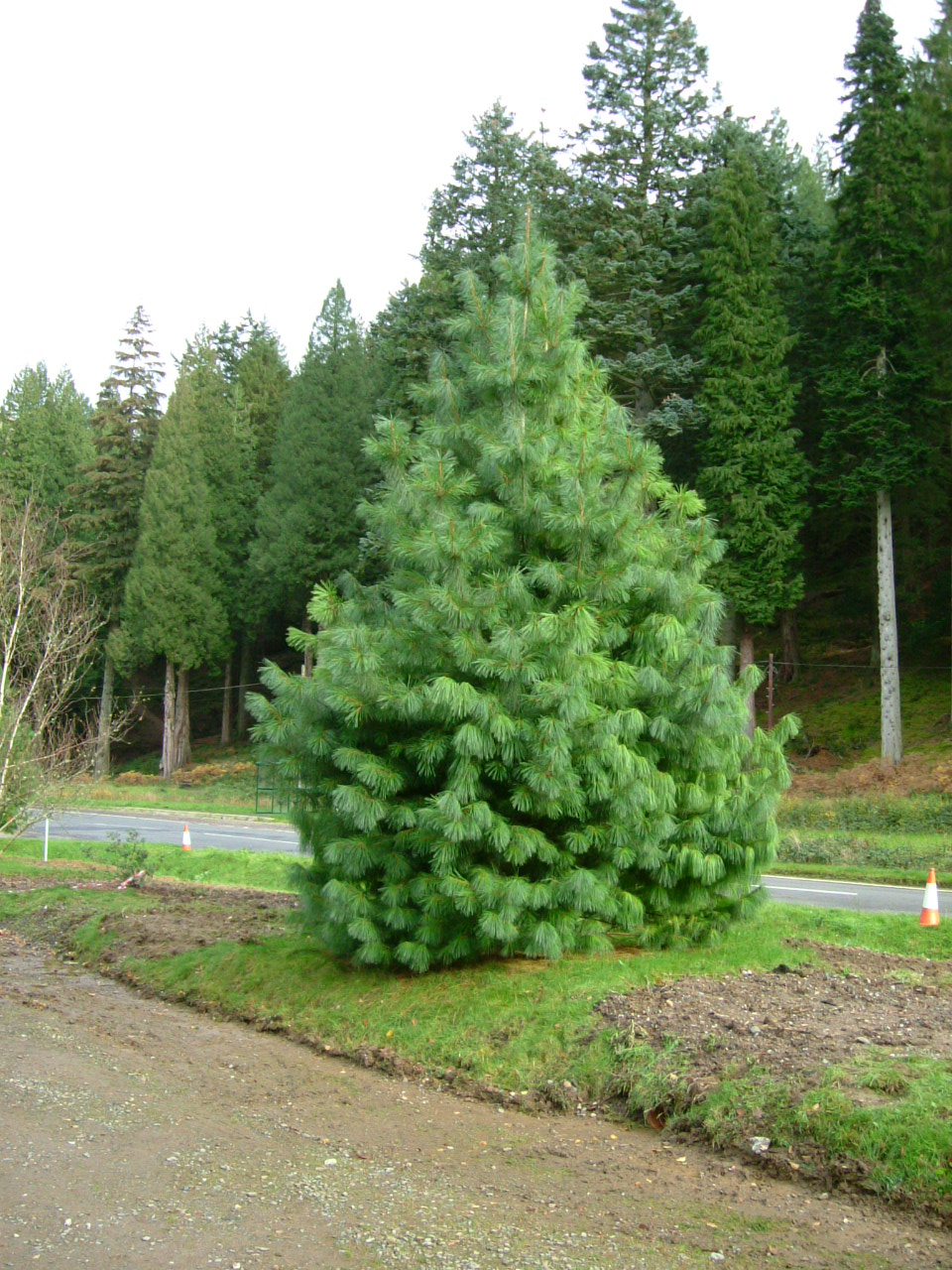
- At the Benmore Botanic Garden, Scotland

Scientific classification
- Kingdom: Plantae
- Clade: Tracheophytes
- Clade: Gymnospermae
- Division: Pinophyta
- Class: Pinopsida
- Order: Pinales
- Family: Pinaceae
- Genus: Pinus
- Species: P. stylesii

Binomial name
- Pinus stylesii Frankis ex Businský
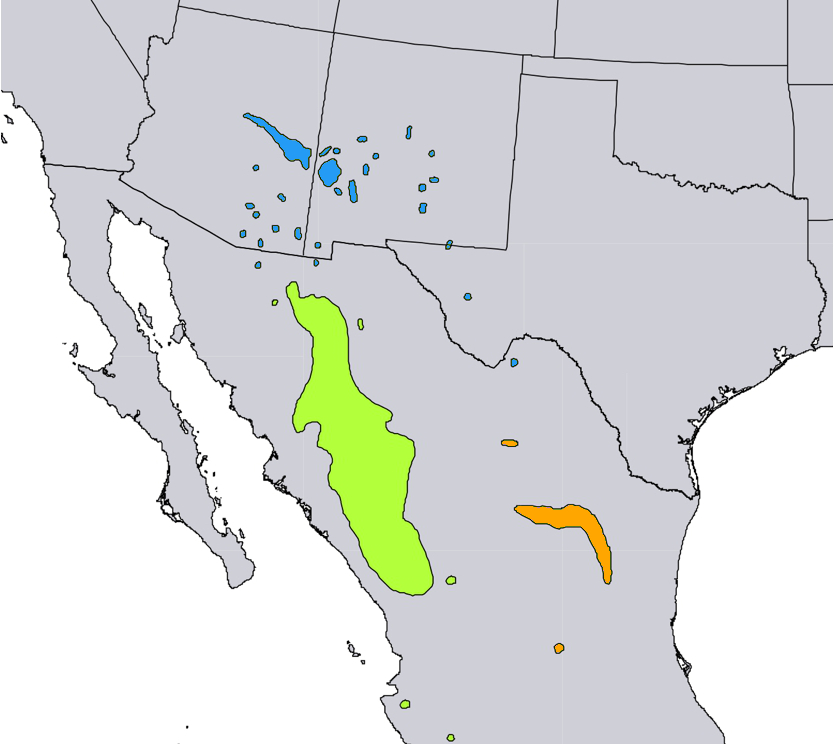
- Pinus stylesii (orange), Pinus reflexa (blue), Pinus strobiformis (green) ranges

= Pinus stylesii =

Species of conifer

Pinus stylesii is a species of pine in the family Pinaceae, native to the northern Sierra Madre Oriental mountains of northeastern Mexico. A tree reaching 25 m (82 ft), it is a member of Pinus subsection Strobus. It was split off from Pinus strobiformis, which is found in the Sierra Madre Occidental.

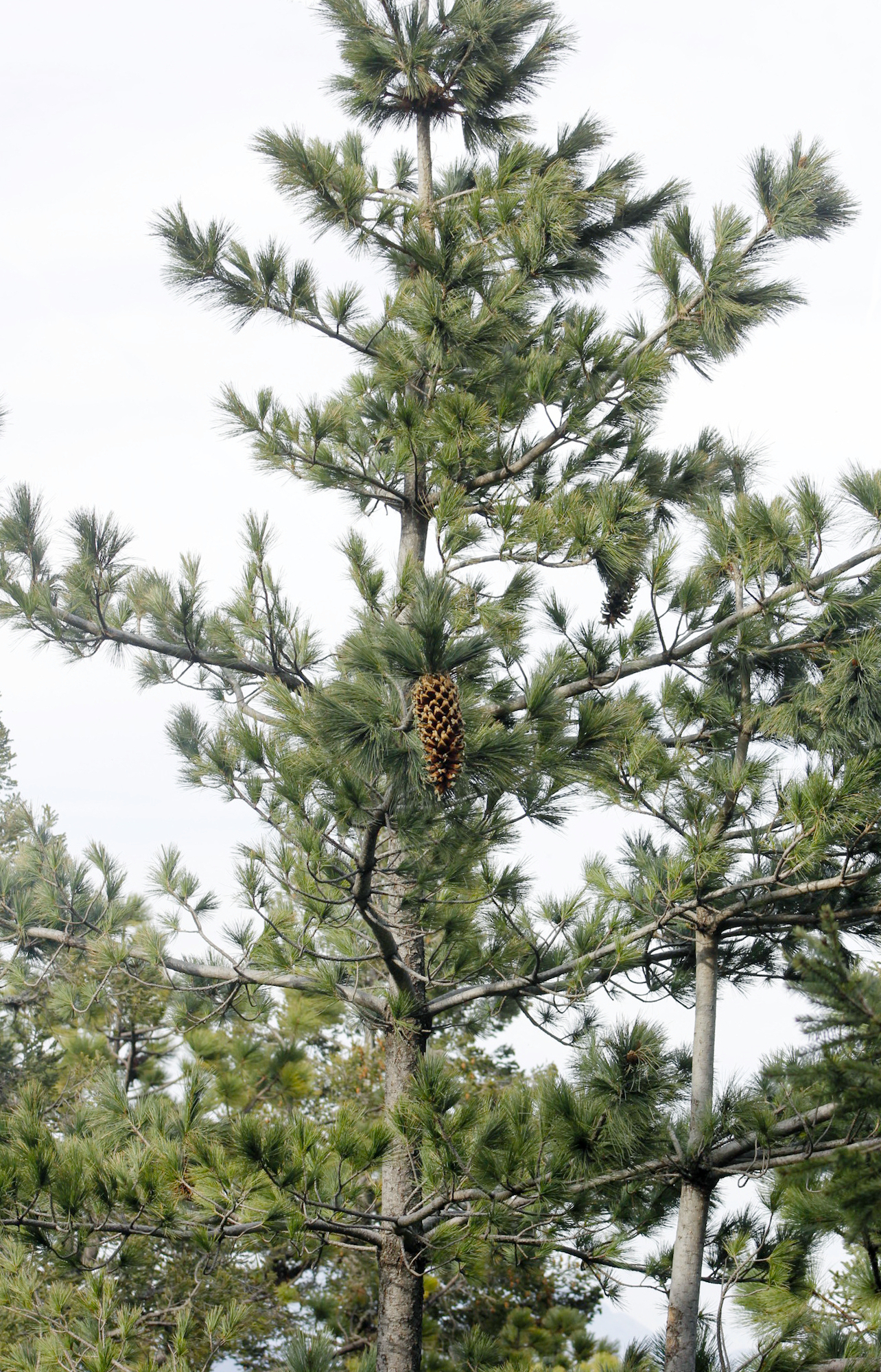
In the wild on Cerro Potosí
