= Toft =

Toft may refer to:

== People ==
- Albert Toft (1862–1949), English sculptor
- Alfonso Toft (1866–1964), English pottery artist
- Christian Toft (born 1968), Danish swimmer
- Claude Toft (1922–1981), Irish politician from Galway
- Hans Toft (born 1947), Danish politician
- Harry Toft (1881–1951), Welsh rugby player
- Henrik Toft (born 1981), Danish footballer
- Henry Toft (1909–1987), English rugby player
- Karl Toft (1936–2018), Canadian sex offender
- Malcolm Toft, English audio engineer
- Mary Toft (1701–1763), English woman involved in a medical hoax
- Mathilde Rivas Toft (born 1997), Norwegian handballer
- Monica Toft, American international relations scholar
- Omar Toft (1886–1921), American racecar driver
- Rolf Toft (born 1992), Danish footballer
- Sandra Toft (born 1989), Danish handball player
- Thomas Toft (died 1698), English potter
- Henrik Toft Hansen (born 1986), Danish handball player
- Rene Toft Hansen (born 1984), Danish handball player
- Majbritt Toft Hansen (born 1993), Danish handball player

== Places ==
- Toft, Nordland, a village in Nordland, Norway
- Toft, Shetland, Scotland

=== England ===
- Toft, Cambridgeshire
- Toft, Cheshire
- Toft, Lincolnshire
- Toft, Warwickshire
- Toft Hill, County Durham
- Toft Monks, Norfolk
- Toft Newton, Lincolnshire

== Other uses ==
- Theatre on Film and Tape Archives (TOFT) of the New York Public Library for the Performing Arts
- Toft Cricket Club, an amateur cricket club in Cheshire, England
- Toft Hall, a 17th-century country house in Toft, Cheshire, England
- Toft Monks Priory, a priory in Norfolk, England
- Toft village, a settlement comprising small, closely packed farms (tofts)

== See also ==
- Toft Hill (disambiguation)
- Tofte (disambiguation)
- Burgage (Scots: toft), a medieval land term used in England and Wales, Ireland and Scotland
- Tuft (disambiguation)
- Tufte, surname
- Tufts (disambiguation)
