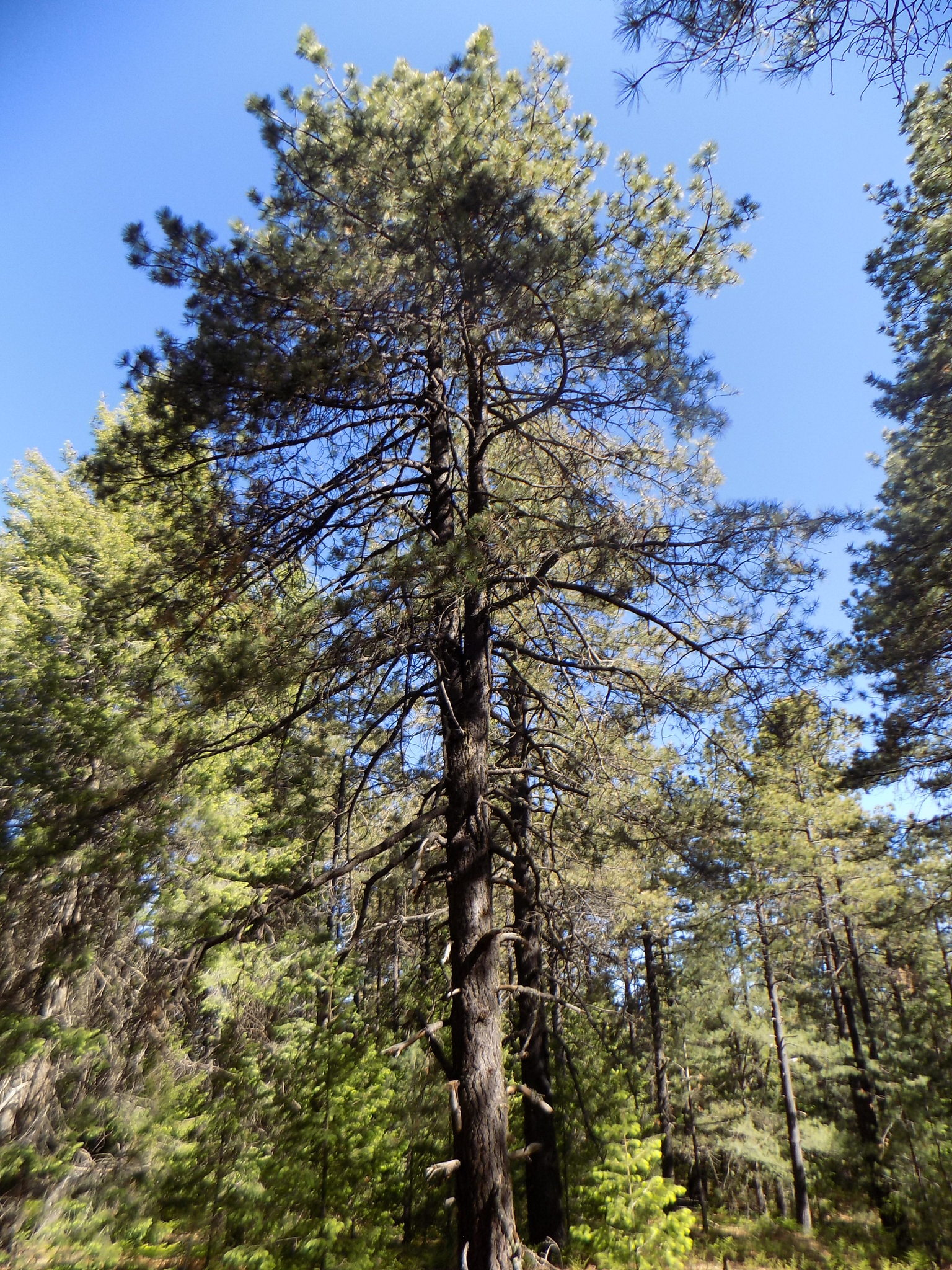

Conservation status
- Near Threatened (IUCN 3.1)

Scientific classification
- Kingdom: Plantae
- Clade: Tracheophytes
- Clade: Gymnospermae
- Division: Pinophyta
- Class: Pinopsida
- Order: Pinales
- Family: Pinaceae
- Genus: Pinus
- Subgenus: P. subg. Pinus
- Section: P. sect. Trifoliae
- Subsection: P. subsect. Ponderosae
- Species: P. durangensis

Binomial name
- Pinus durangensis Martínez
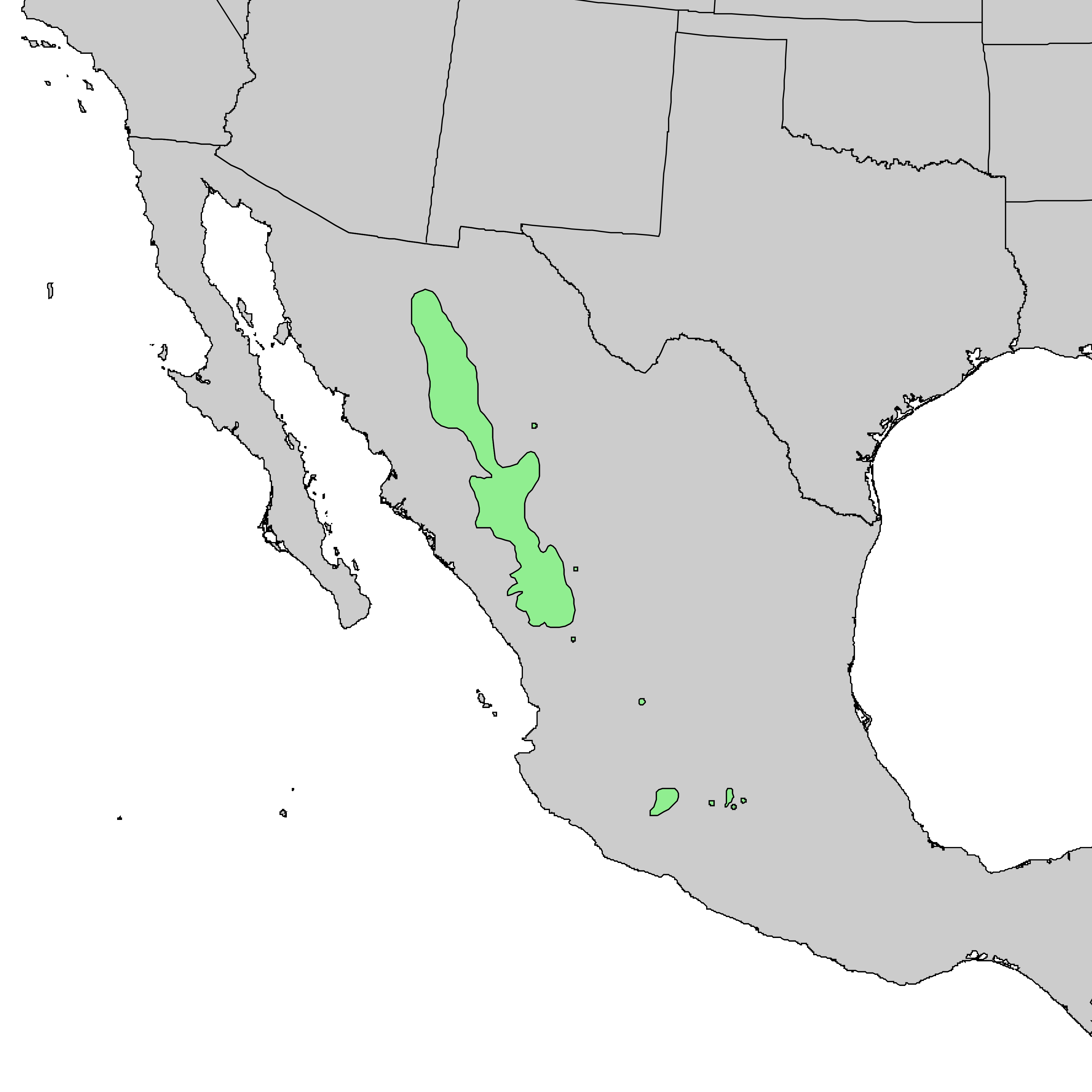
- Natural range of Pinus durangensis

= Pinus durangensis =

Species of conifer

Pinus durangensis, the Durango pine or pino real is a pine tree species endemic to the Sierra Madre Occidental mountain range of north-western Mexico.

This species is related to Pinus ponderosa (Ponderosa pine), and included in the same subsection Ponderosae.

== Distribution ==
The tree is found from Chihuahua and Sonora, southwards through Durango and Jalisco, to Michoacán. It is a moderately high altitude species, growing at 1,500–2,800 metres (4,900–9,200 ft).

== Description ==
Pinus durangensis is an evergreen tree reaching 25–40 metres (82–131 ft) in height, with a trunk up to 1 metre (3.3 ft) in diameter and a broad, rounded crown. The bark is thick, dark gray-brown, and scaly or fissured.

The leaves are needle-like, dark green, five to seven, rarely eight per fascicle (mostly six, the high regularly occurring number in the genus), 14–24 cm long and 0.7-1.1 mm wide, the persistent fascicle sheath 1.5–3 cm long.

The cones are ovoid, 5–9 cm long, green ripening brown, opening when mature in spring to 5–6 cm broad. The seeds are winged, 5–6 mm long with a 1.5-2.5 cm wing. Pollination is in late spring, with the cones maturing 20–22 months after.
