= Fascicle =

Fascicle or fasciculus may refer to:

== Anatomy and histology ==
- Muscle fascicle, a bundle of skeletal muscle fibers
- Nerve fascicle, a bundle of axons (nerve fibers)
  - Superior longitudinal fasciculus
    - Arcuate fasciculus
  - Gracile fasciculus
  - Cuneate fasciculus
  - Dorsal longitudinal fasciculus
  - Medial longitudinal fasciculus
  - Flechsig's fasciculus
- Fascicular pattern of histopathologic architecture

== Botany ==
- Fascicle (botany), a cluster of flowers or leaves, such as the bundles of the thin leaves (or needles) of pines
- A discrete bundle of vascular tissue

== Other uses ==
- Fasciculus, a fossil comb jelly
- Fasciculus Chemicus, a 17th-century anthology of alchemical writings
- Fascicle (book), a discrete section of a larger book or other published work issued in serial form
