= Toft Hill =

Toft Hill may refer to:

- Toft Hill, County Durham
- Toft Hill, Lincolnshire
