= Tufte =

Tufte is a surname of Norwegian origin. Notable people with the name include:

- Bård Tufte Johansen (born 1969), Norwegian comedian
- Edward Tufte (born 1942), American statistician, political scientist, graphic designer, and author
- Jerod E. Tufte (born 1975), American jurist
- Olaf Tufte (1976–2026), Norwegian rower
- Riley Tufte (born 1998), American ice hockey player
- Virginia Tufte (fl. 1920s-2010s), American author and professor of English

== See also ==
- Tofte (disambiguation)
- Toft (disambiguation)
- Tuft (surname)
