= Tofte =

Tofte is a surname of Norwegian origin which may refer to:

== People ==
- Andreas Tofte (1794–1851), Norwegian businessman and politician from Oslo
- Arthur Tofte (1902–1980), American science fiction and fantasy author
- Britt Pettersen Tofte (born 1961), Norwegian cross country skier
- Jørg Tofte Jebsen (1888–1922), Norwegian physicist
- Jørgen Tofte Nielsen (born 1971), Danish football player
- Mads Tofte (born 1959), Danish computer scientist
- Robert Tofte (1562–1620), English translator and poet
- Tracy Tofte (nee Wells, born 1971), American actress
- Valdemar Tofte (1832–1907), Danish violinist and teacher
- Ørnulf Tofte (1922–2020), Norwegian police officer

== Places ==
- Tofte, Norway, village in the municipality of Asker, Norway
  - Södra Cell Tofte, a pulp mill located in Tofte, Norway
- Tofte Township, Cook County, Minnesota, an American township
  - Tofte, Minnesota, an unincorporated community in Tofte Township
- Tofte Glacier, on Peter I Island near Antarctica

== See also ==
- Toft (disambiguation)
- Tuft (disambiguation)
- Tufte, surname
