= Fascicle (botany) =

Bundle of leaves or flowers growing crowded together

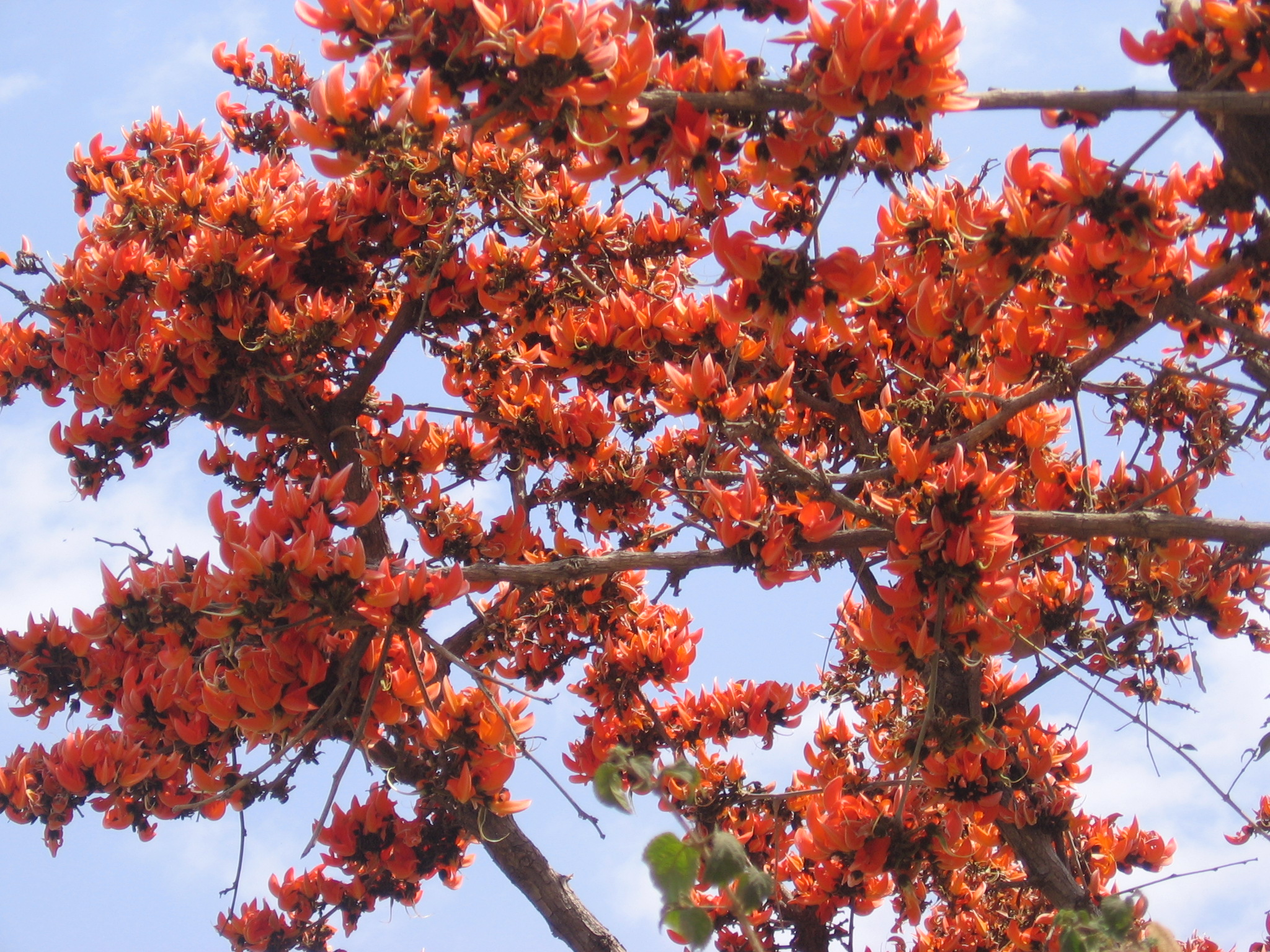
Fascicled flowers of Butea monosperma, (Flame of the forest)

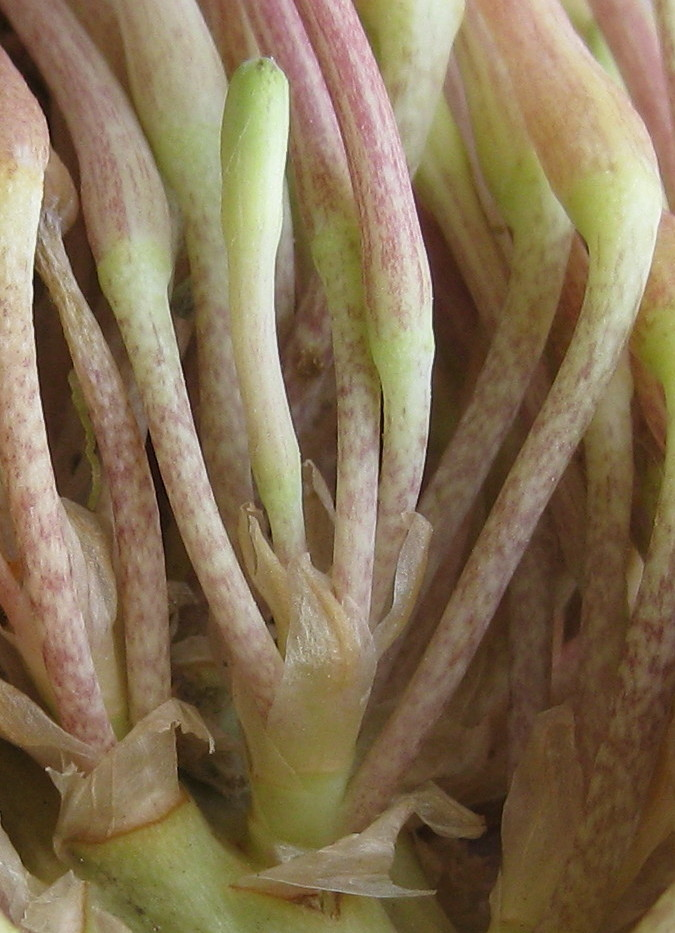
Details of fasciculation of florets in an inflorescence of a Sansevieria species

In botany, a fascicle is a bundle of leaves or flowers growing crowded together; alternatively the term might refer to the vascular tissues that supply such an organ with nutrients. However, vascular tissues may occur in fascicles even when the organs they supply are not fascicled.

== Etymology of fascicle and related terms ==
The term fascicle and its derived terms such as fasciculation are from the Latin fasciculus, the diminutive of fascis, a bundle. Accordingly, such words occur in many forms and contexts wherever they are convenient for descriptive purposes. A fascicle may be leaves or flowers on a short shoot where the nodes of a shoot are crowded without clear internodes, such as in species of Pinus or Rhigozum. However, bundled fibres, nerves or bristles as in tissues or the glochid fascicles of Opuntia may have little or nothing to do with branch morphology.

== In pines ==
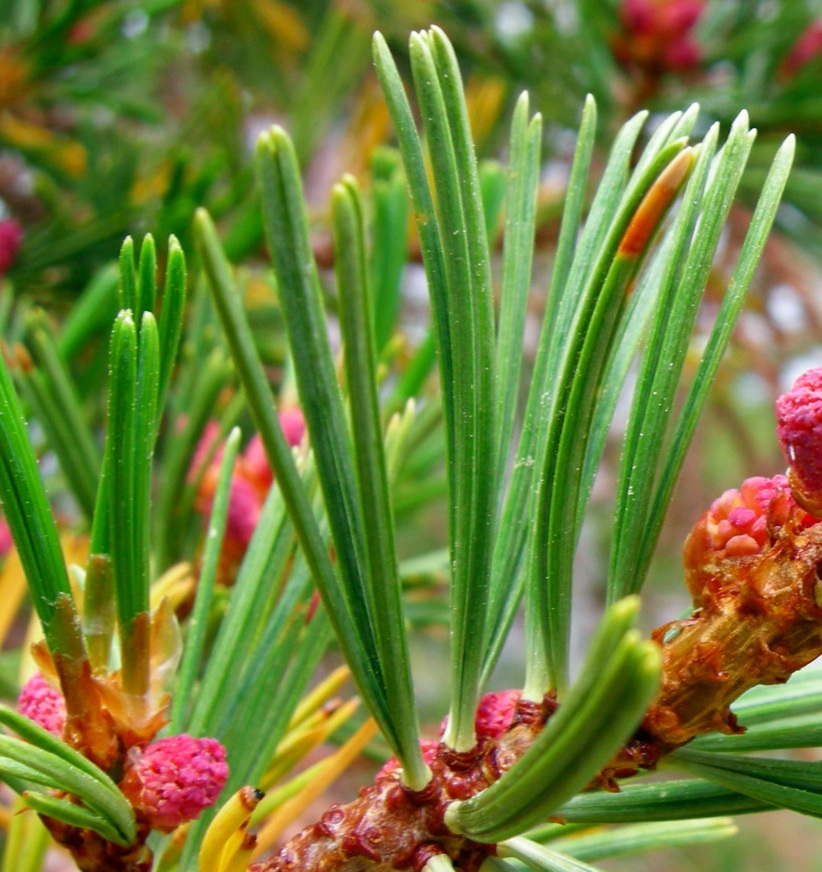
Five-needled fascicles on a twig of Pinus flexilis

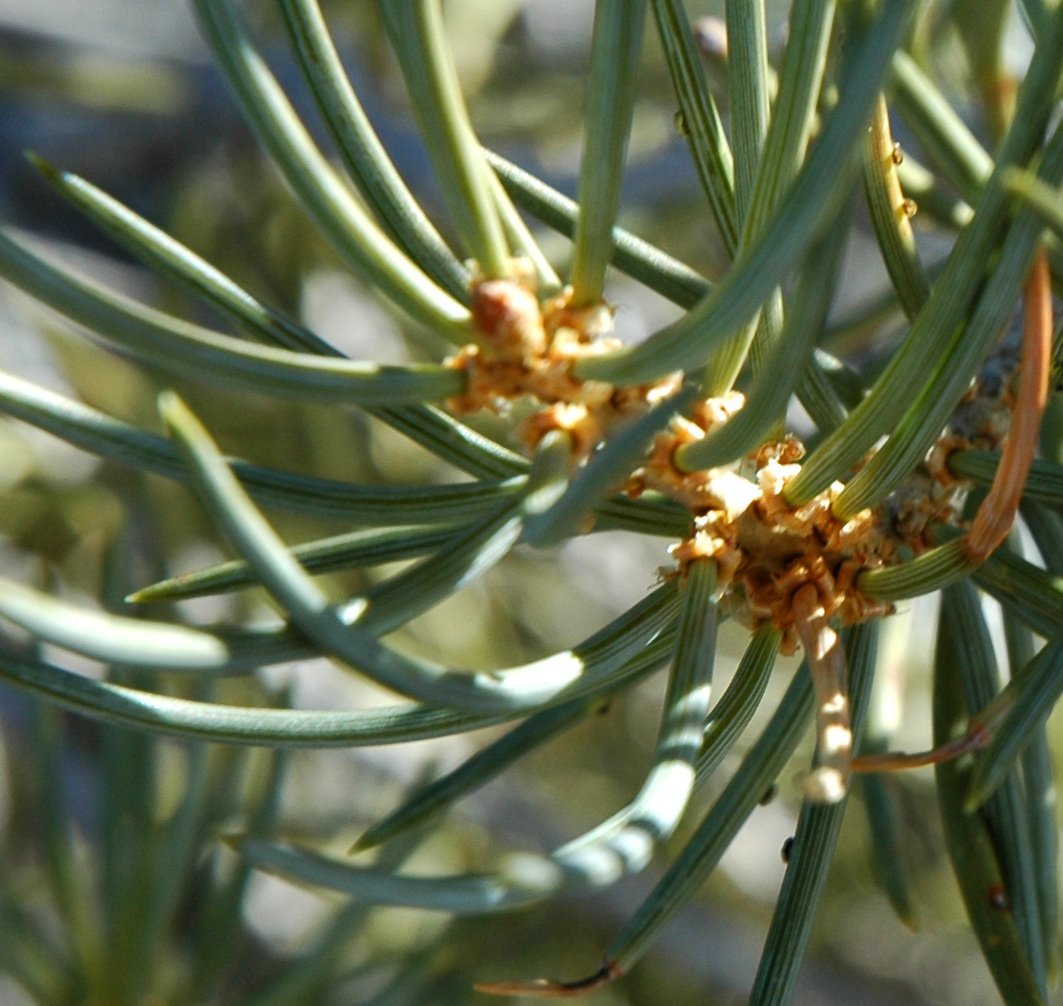
Single-needled fascicles on a twig of Pinus monophylla

Leaf fascicles are present in all pines, and the number of adult leaves (needles) per fascicle is an important character for identification of pine species and genera. Most species have fascicles of two to five needles; only occasional species typically have as few as one or as many as six leaves to the fascicle.

Variation is high between species, low within them. For example, Pinus flexilis (limber pine), has fascicles of five needles. This pine is a member of the white pine group, Pinus subgenus Strobus, section Strobus. In all members of the group the fascicles nearly all have five needles and the sheath at the base of the fascicle is deciduous.

The fascicle sheath is another character that is important for identification. Among North American pines the sheath is persistent in all so-called hard pines and deciduous in all so-called soft pines. Thus, the fascicle sheath and number of needles can be used to identify valuable timber pines in all seasons and many years before they are mature enough to produce cones. These two characters readily distinguish the major groups of pines (see Pinus classification).

Pinus durangensis (Durango pine) has fascicles of six needles, rarely seven, and is the only species in Pinus with so many needles per fascicle. At the other extreme, Pinus monophylla has fascicles of one needle, rarely two. This is the only species of pine with just one needle per fascicle, and this rare and easily observed character is reflected in the specific epithet monophylla and in the common name single-leaf pinyon. Although it might strike non-botanists as illogical to apply the term "fascicle" to a stem bearing a single leaf, the justification is that the structure of the stem is consistent with other pine fascicles, which justifies generalising the term to embrace single-needle fascicles as well.

== In flowering plants ==
Fascicles do occur in some flowering plants, though not as frequently as in many conifers. Consequently, when fascicles are present the specific epithet often refers to them.

Examples include Prunus fasciculata and Adenostoma fasciculatum. Species with flowers in fascicles include Aechmea biflora and Melicytus ramiflorus, several species of Malva, and the entire genus Flueggea. Some species of the family Alseuosmiaceae have flowers in fascicles.

In the Bignoniaceae in the genus Rhigozum flowers are borne in fascicles from cushion-like, dwarf branchlets in the axils of leaves, and several species also bear leaves in fascicles on similar or shared branchlets.

Both leaf and flower fascicles occur among Angiospermae, often as adaptations facilitating pollination, such as in many Lamiaceae, of which some Lavandula are typical. Other plant fascicles are adaptations to achieve greater compactness for defensive reasons. For example, in Opuntia cacti, spines are produced in fascicles bearing a few long spines and many short spiny bristles (or glochids).

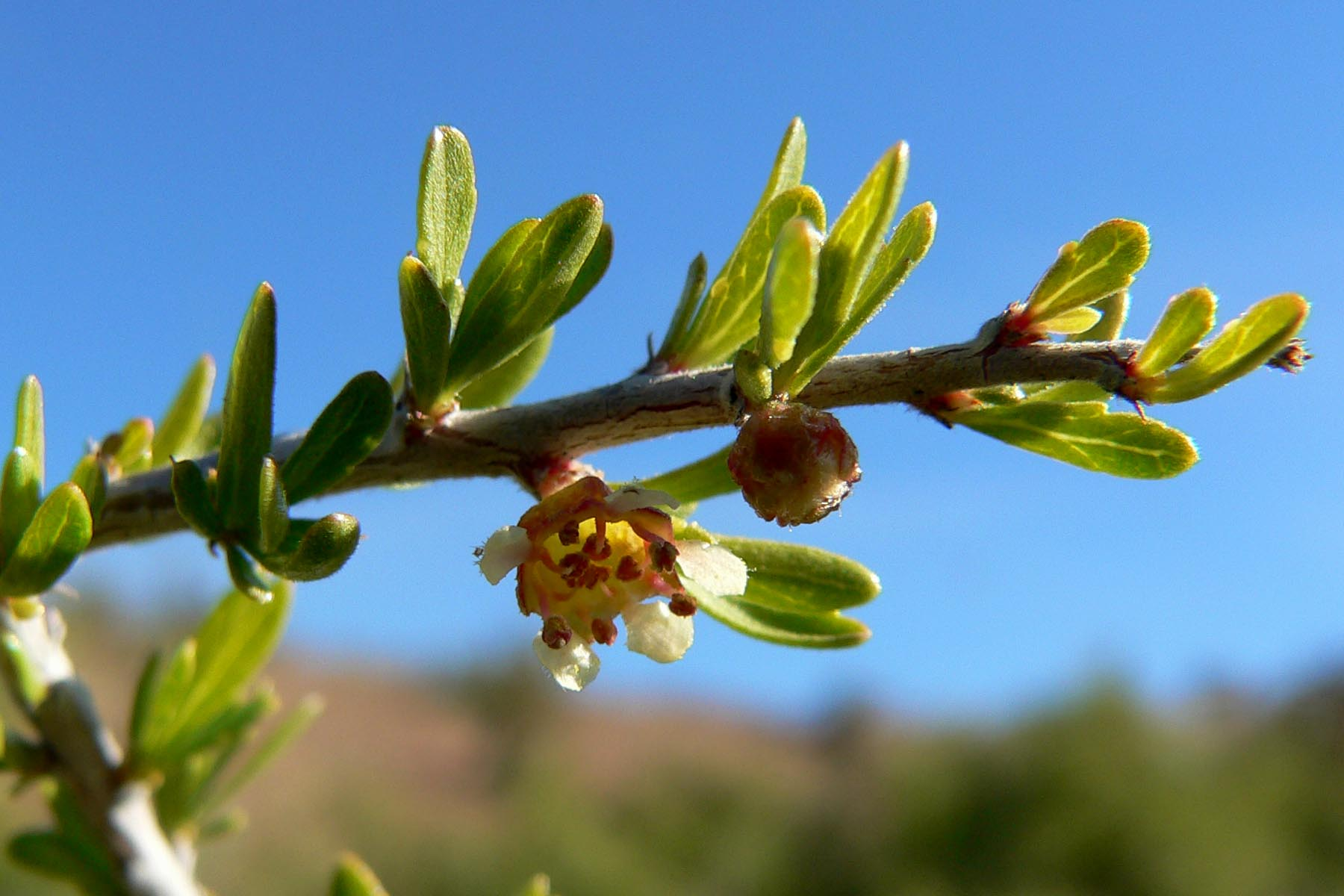
Prunus fasciculata

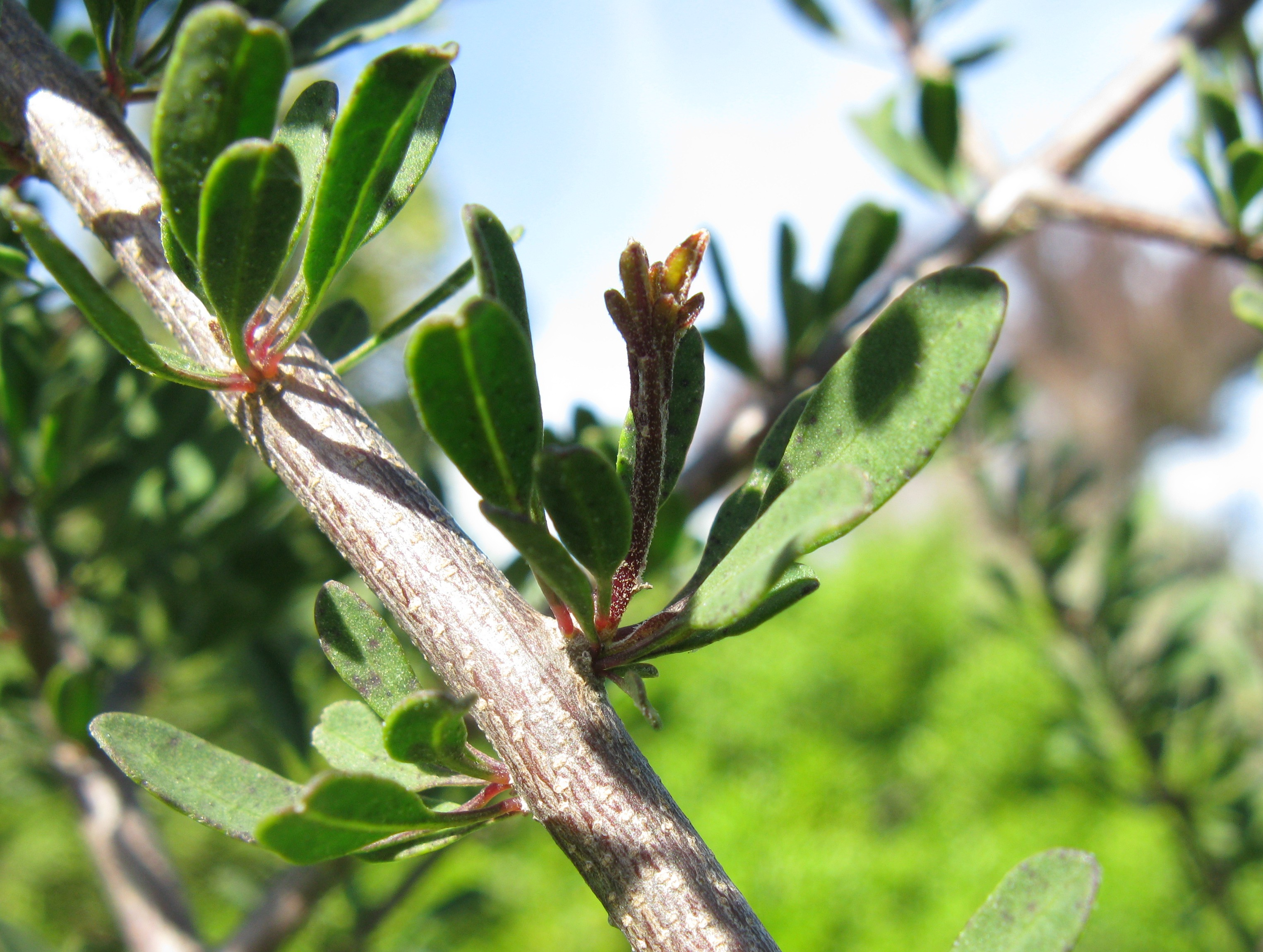
Rhigozum obovatum fascicle on a mature, growing branch, the fascicle in an axil of a leaf, and with a new branch emerging from it.

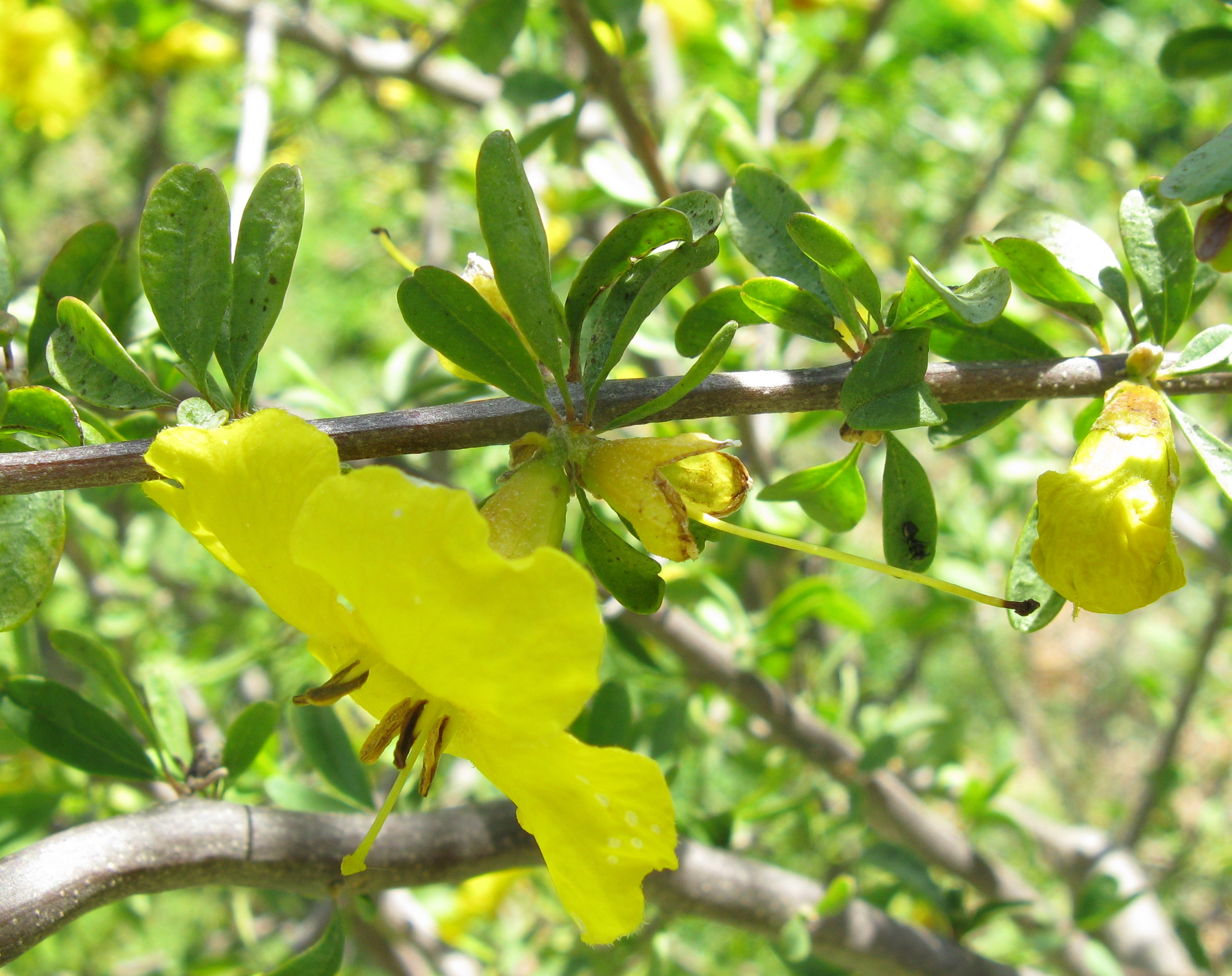
Rhigozum obovatum fascicle of leaves plus flowers

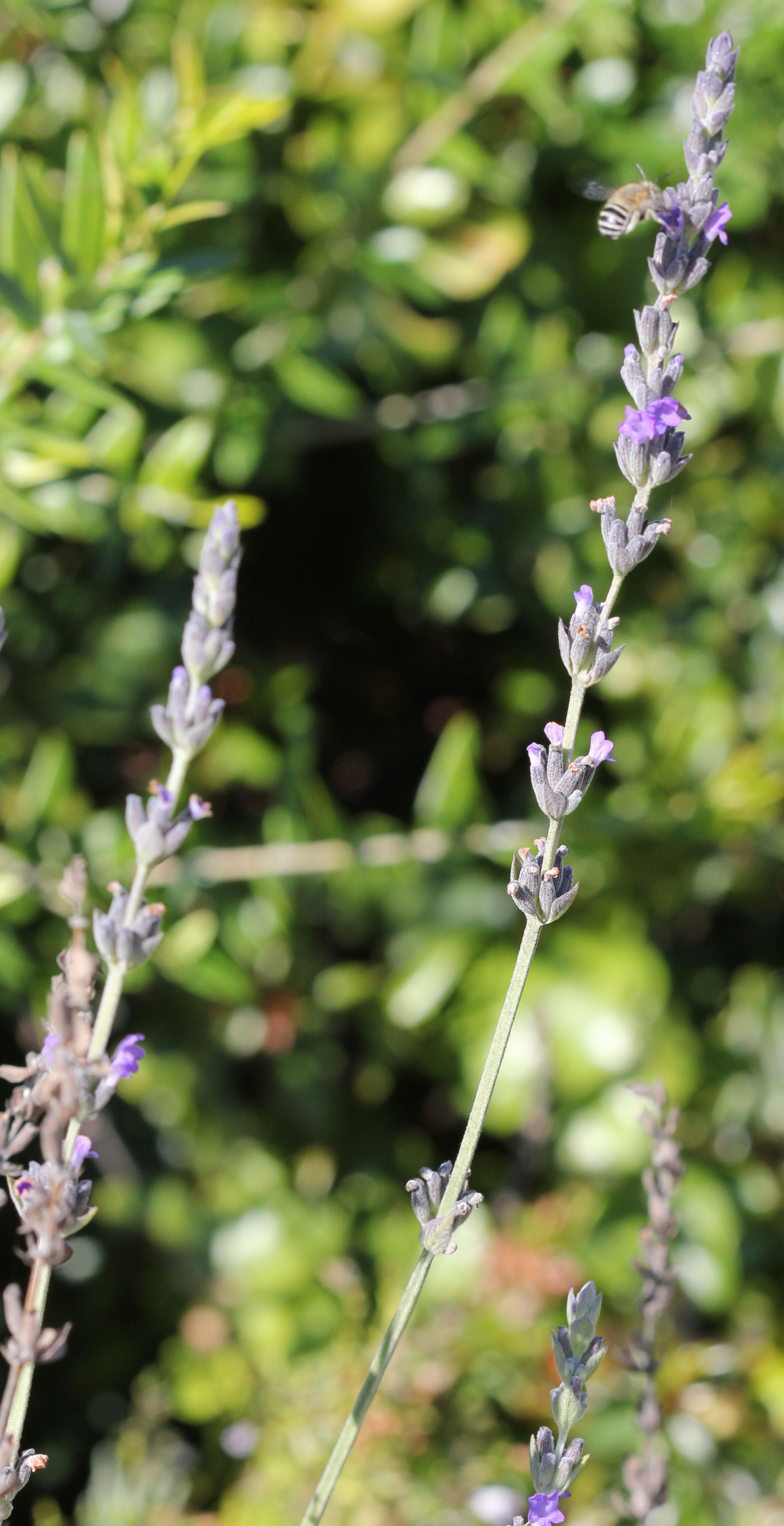
Lavandula peduncle showing flowers fasciculated into whorls or partial whorls around the peduncle

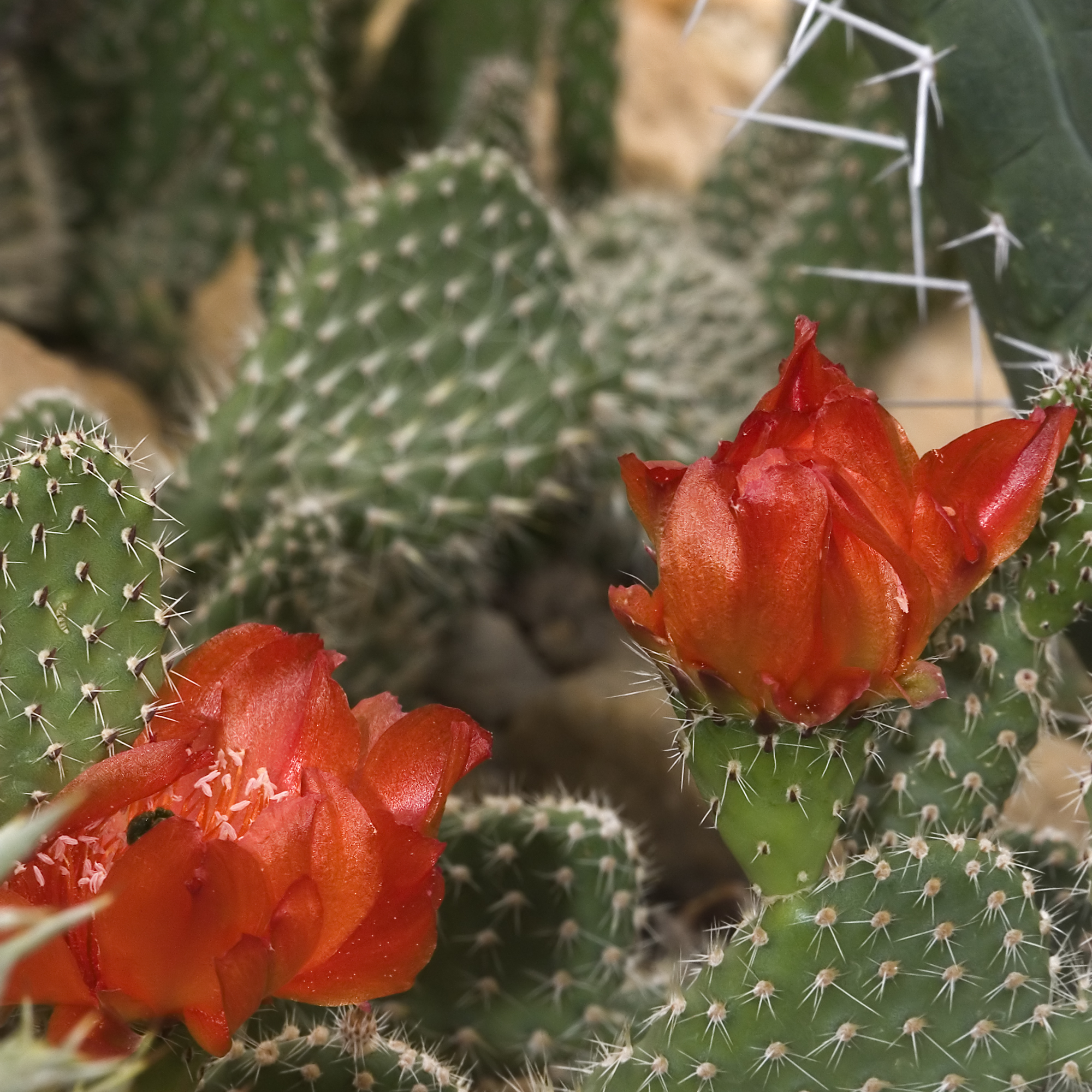
Opuntia picardoi, showing defensively fasciculated spines and glochids

== In lower plants ==
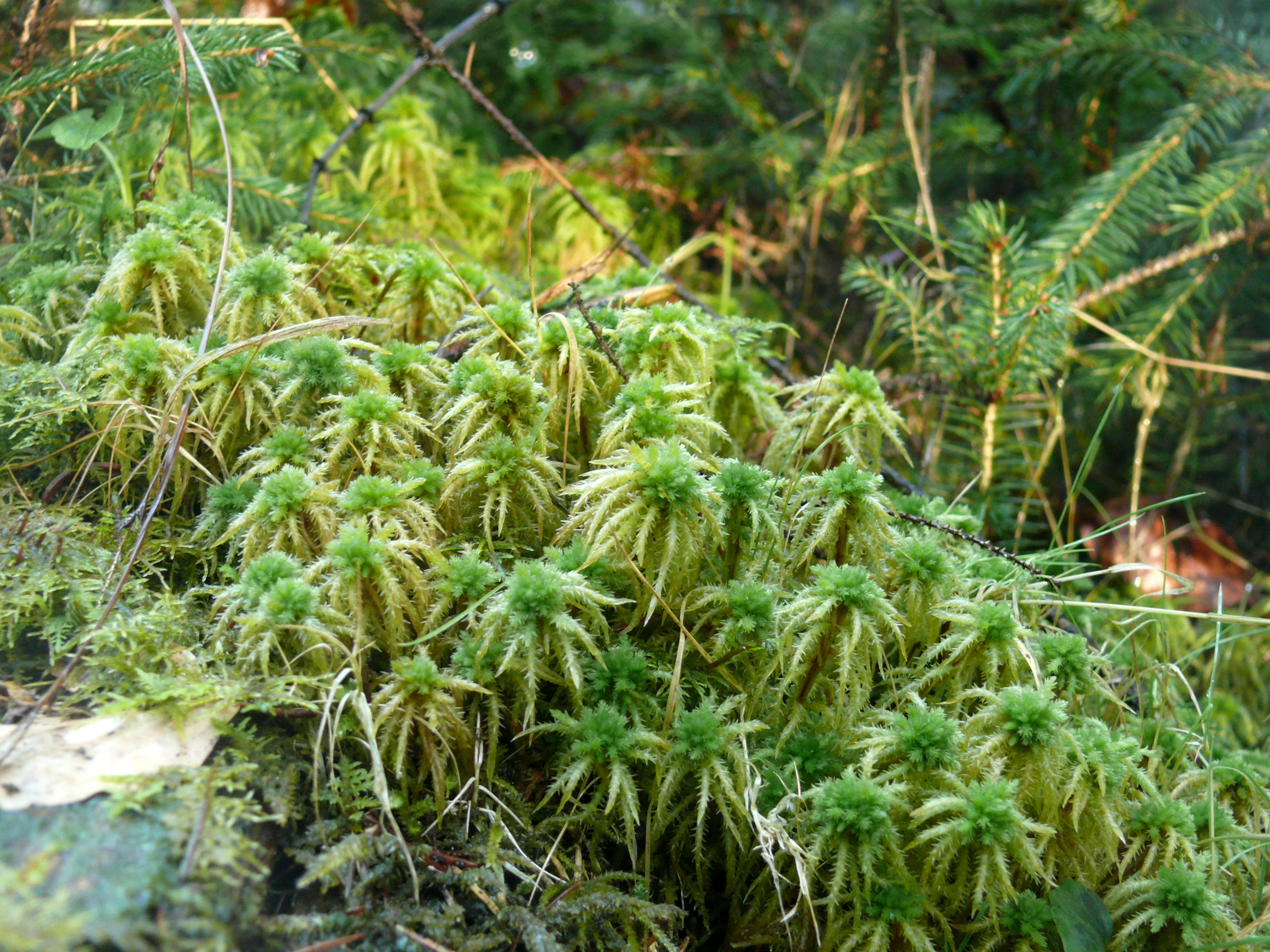
Sphagnum squarrosum, showing fasciculated branching

Sphagnum species bear branches in fascicles.

== See also ==
- Fascicle (disambiguation)
- Spur
