= List of pines by region =

This is a list of pine species by geographical distribution. For a taxonomy of the genus, see Pinus classification.

== Old World ==
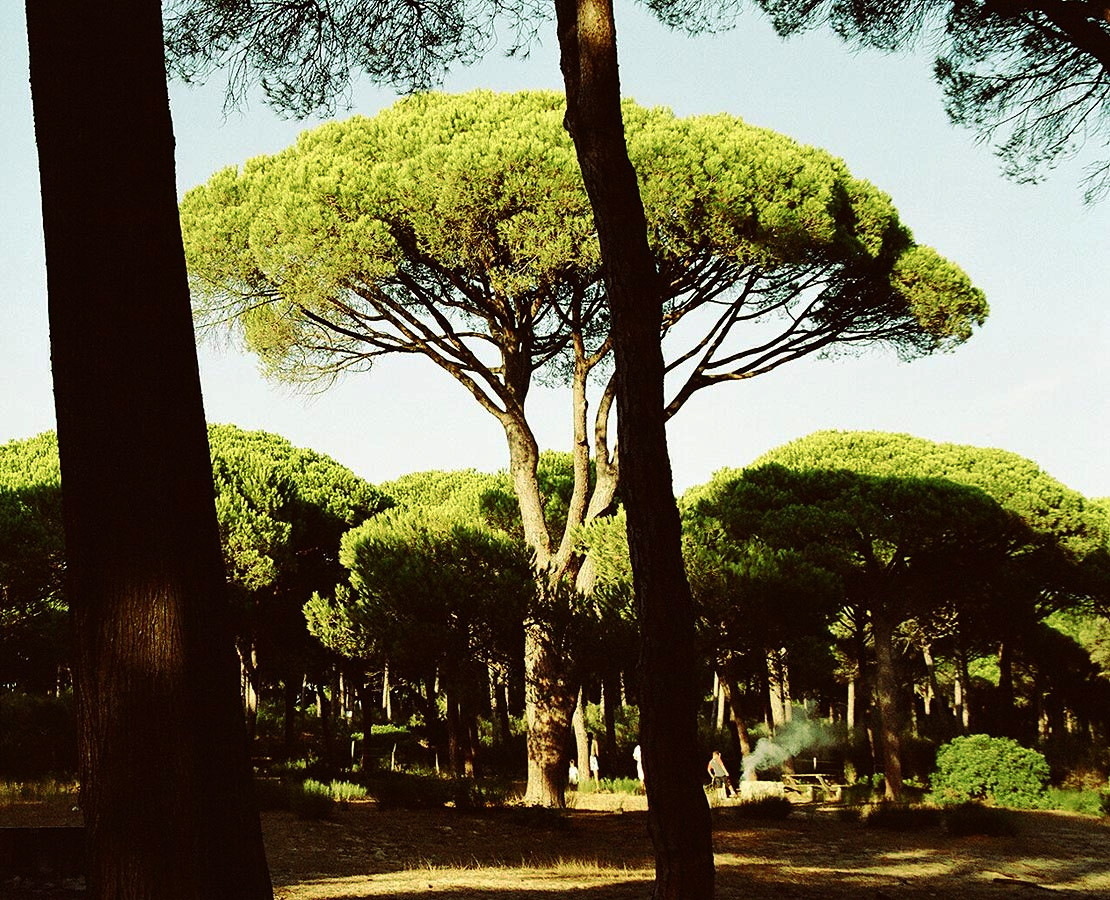
Mature Pinus pinea (stone pine); note umbrella-shaped canopy

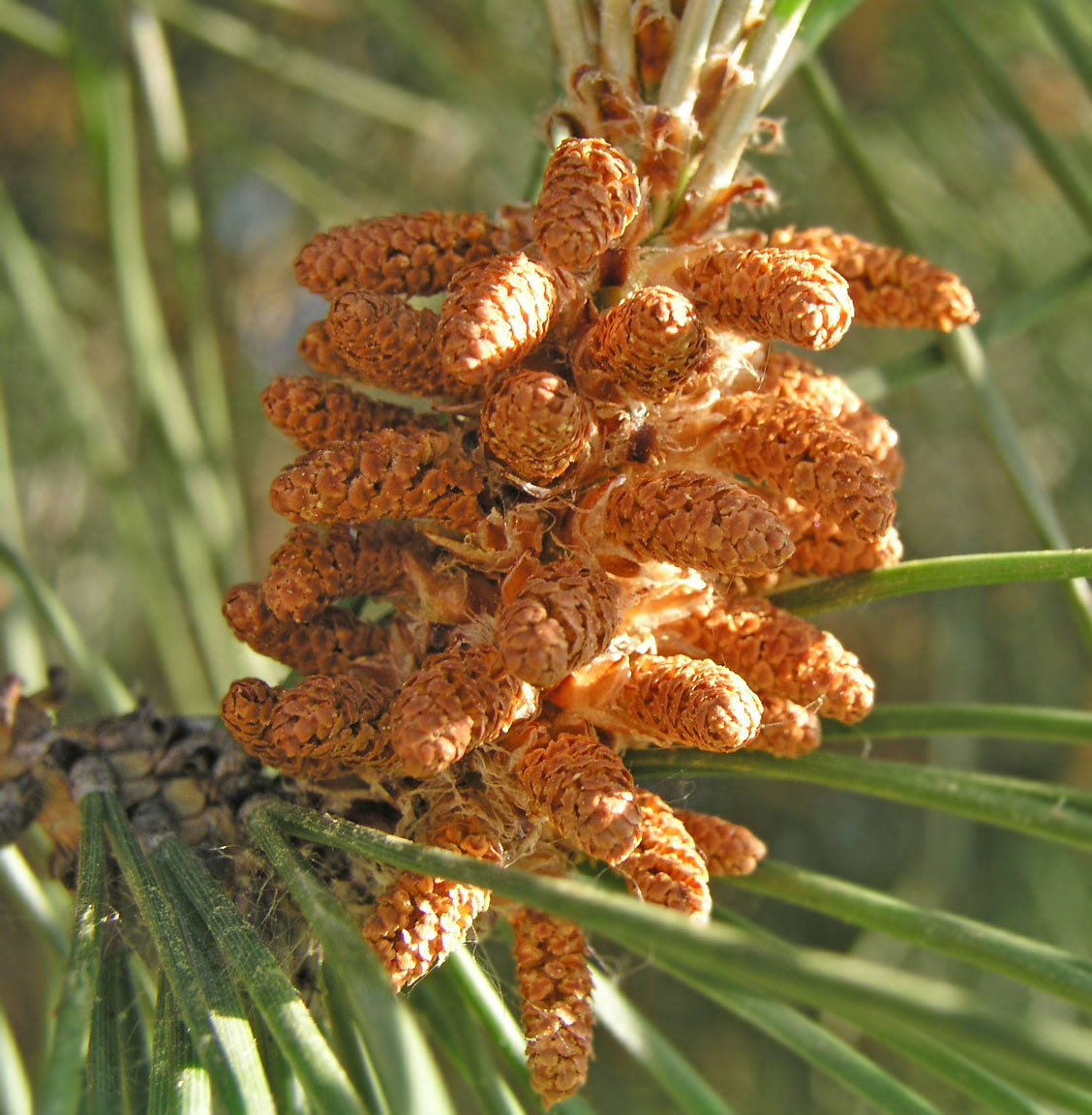
Pollen cones of Pinus pinea (stone pine)

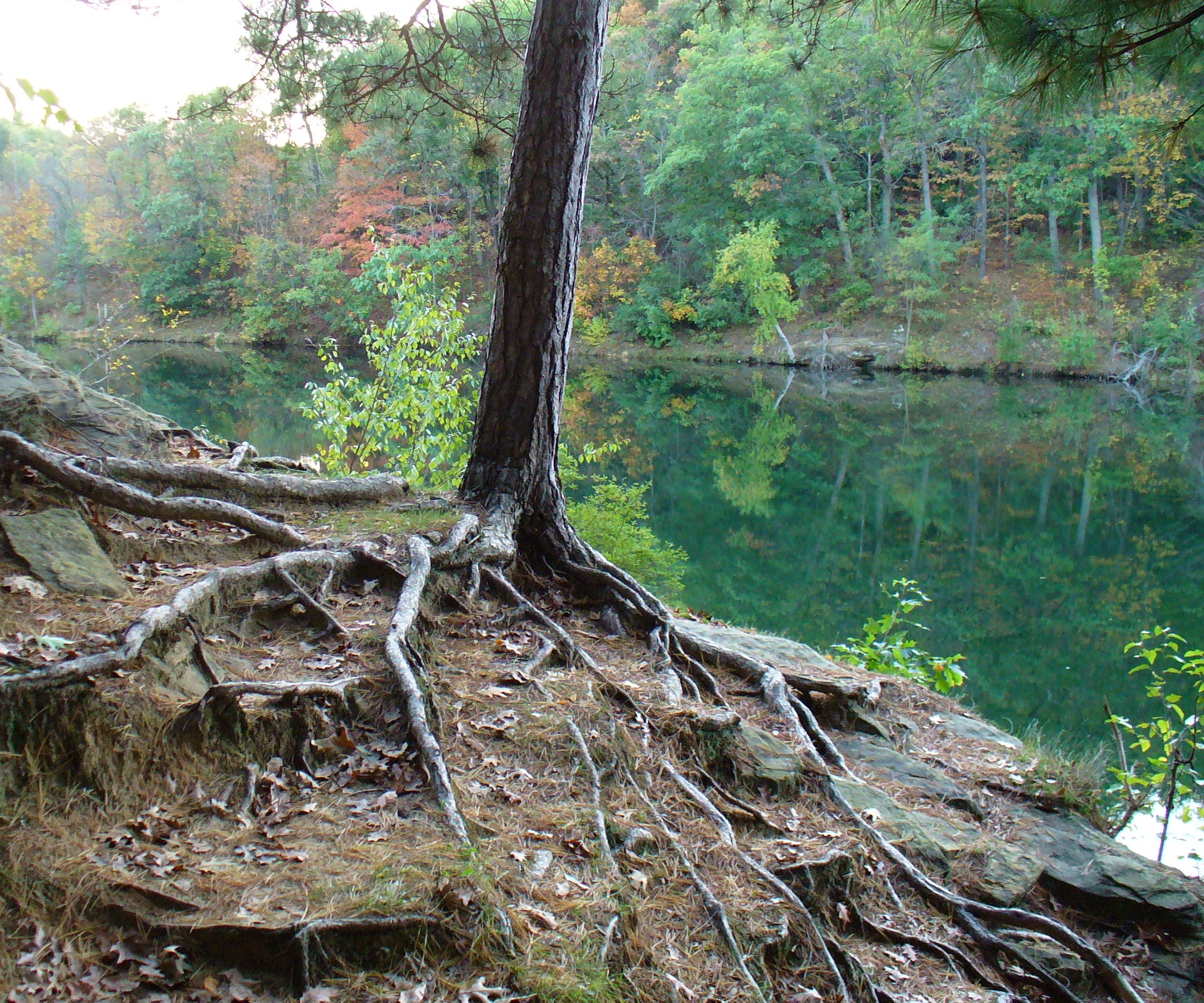
A red pine (Pinus resinosa) with exposed roots

Young spring growth ("candles") on a loblolly pine

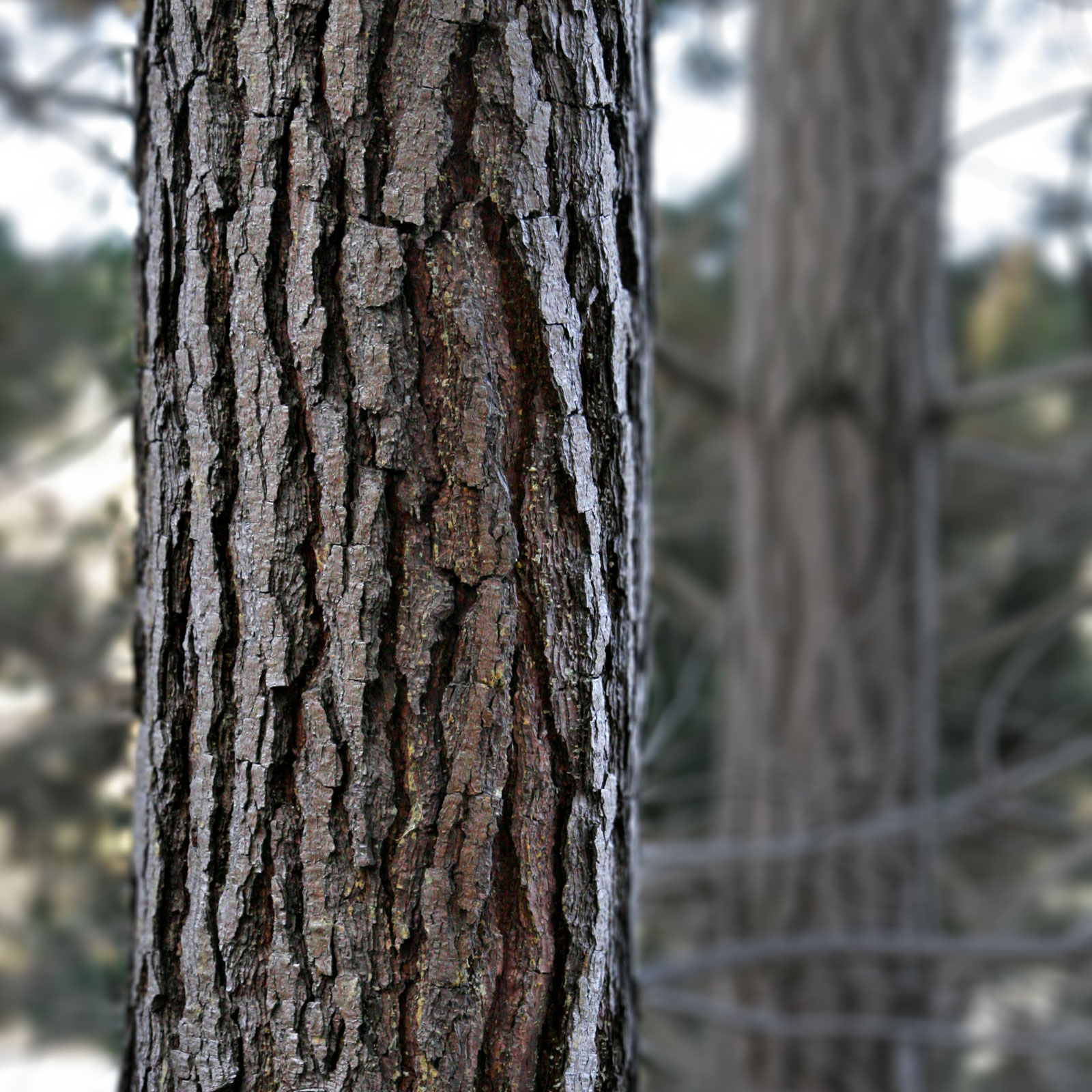
Monterey pine bark

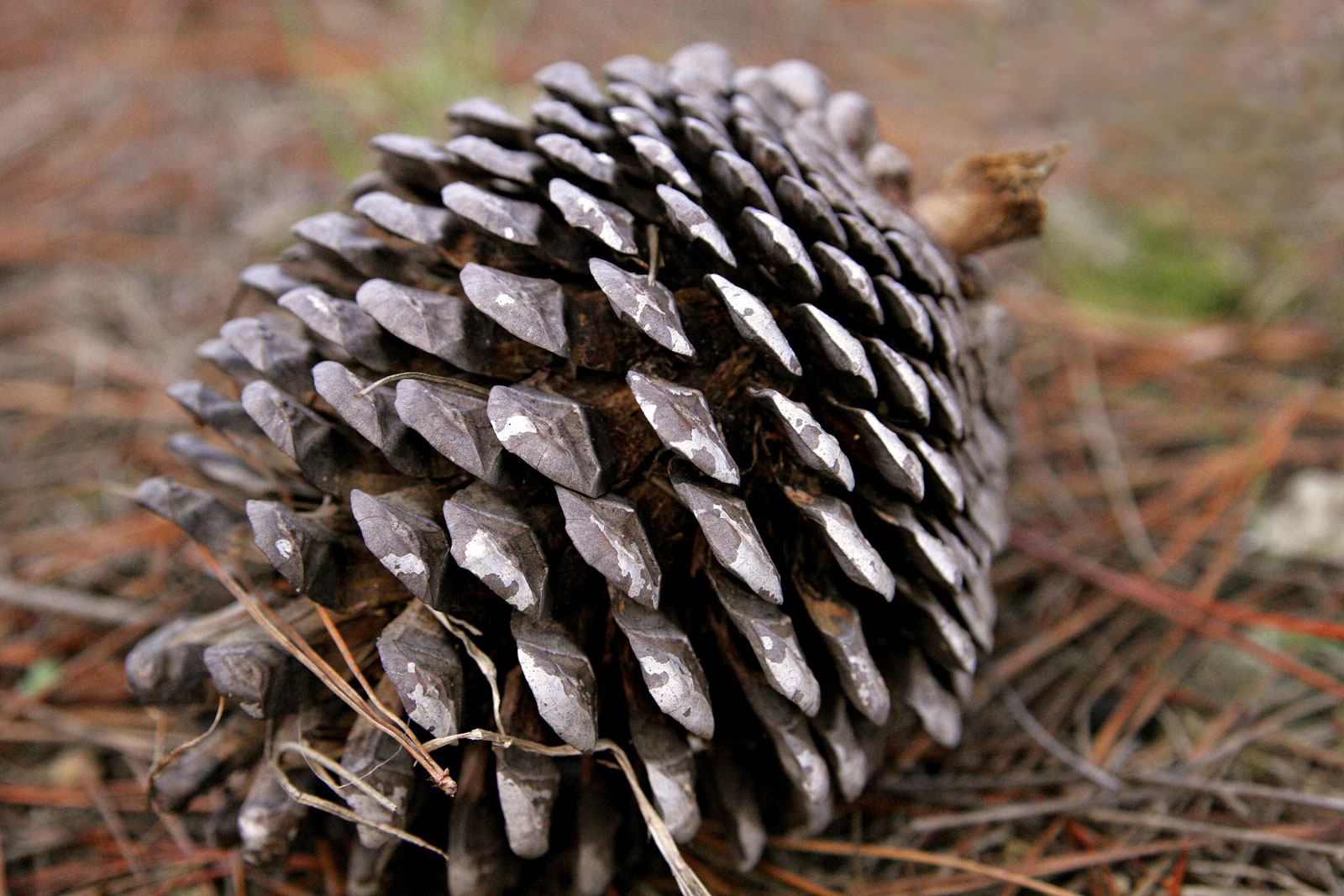
Monterey pine cone on forest floor

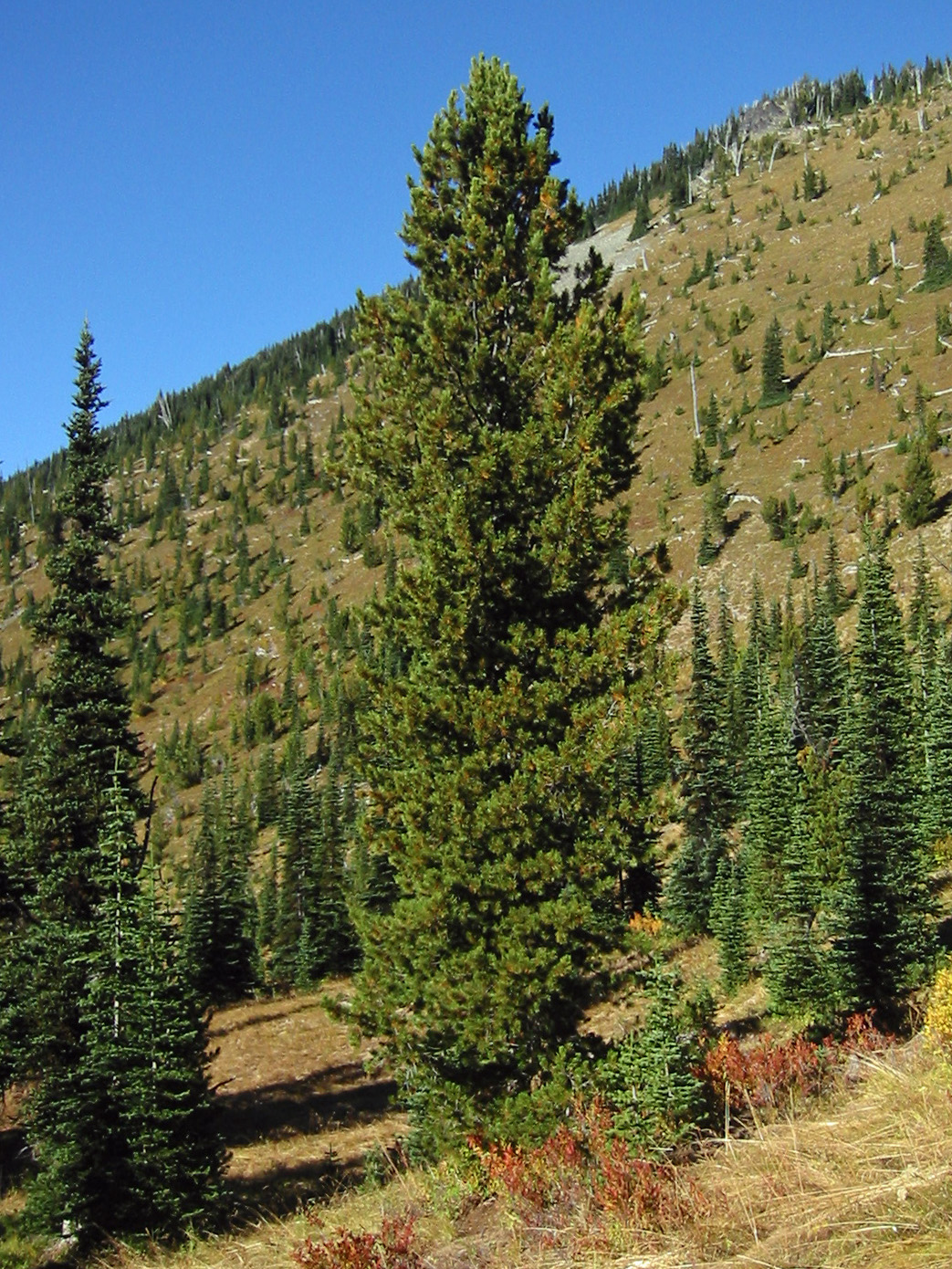
Whitebark pine in the Sierra Nevada

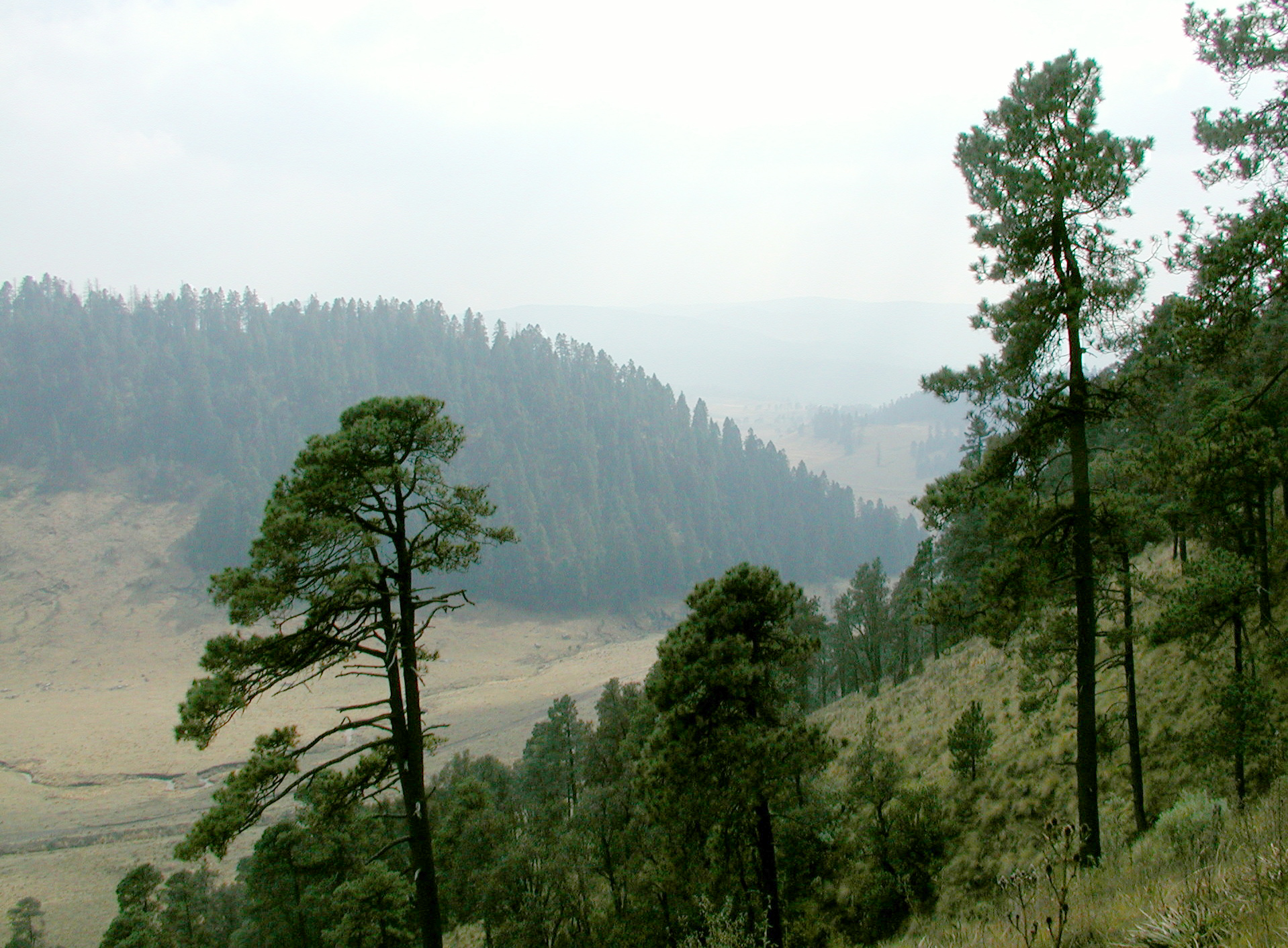
Hartweg's pine forest in Mexico

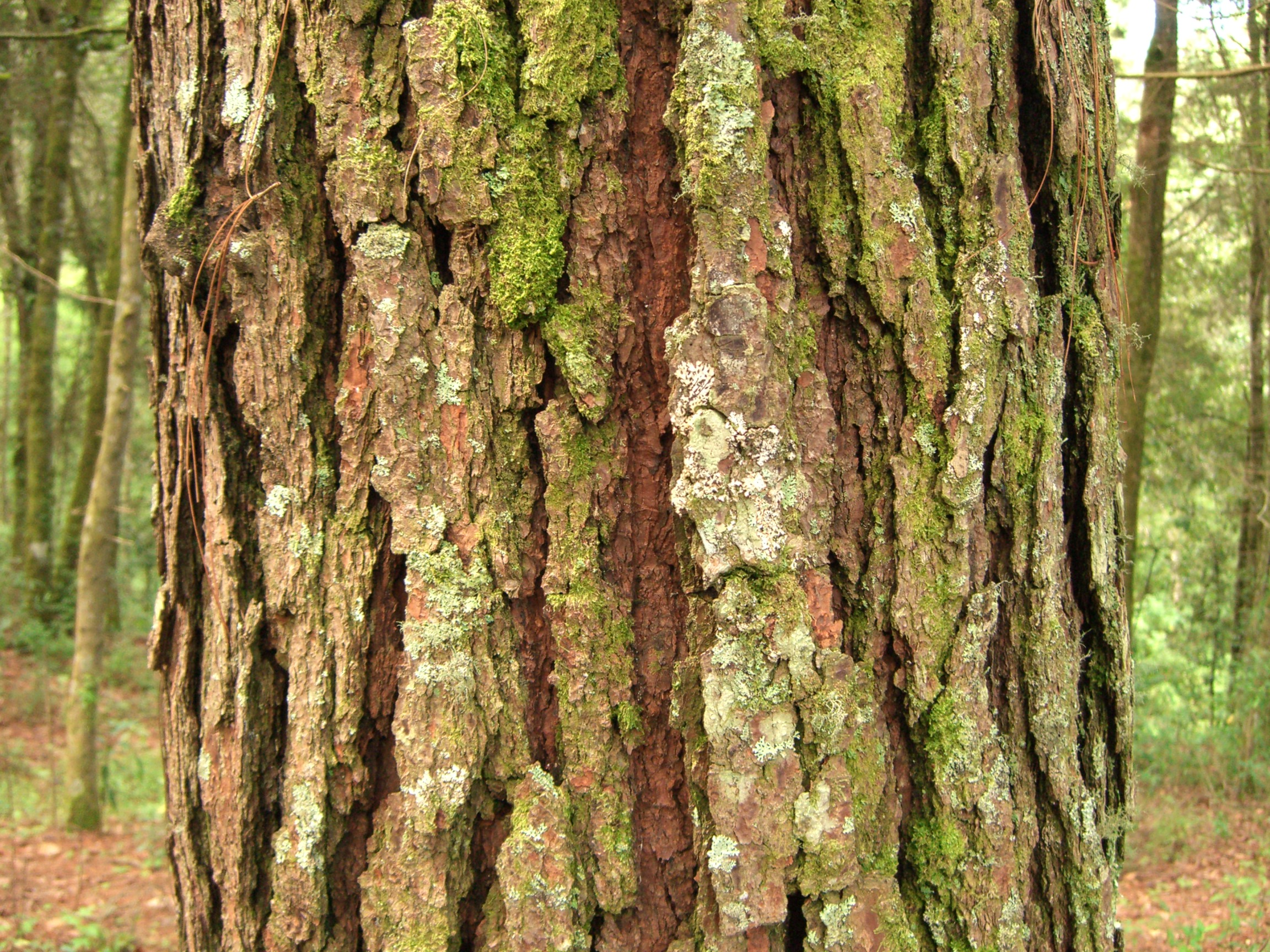
The bark of a pine in Tecpan, Guatemala

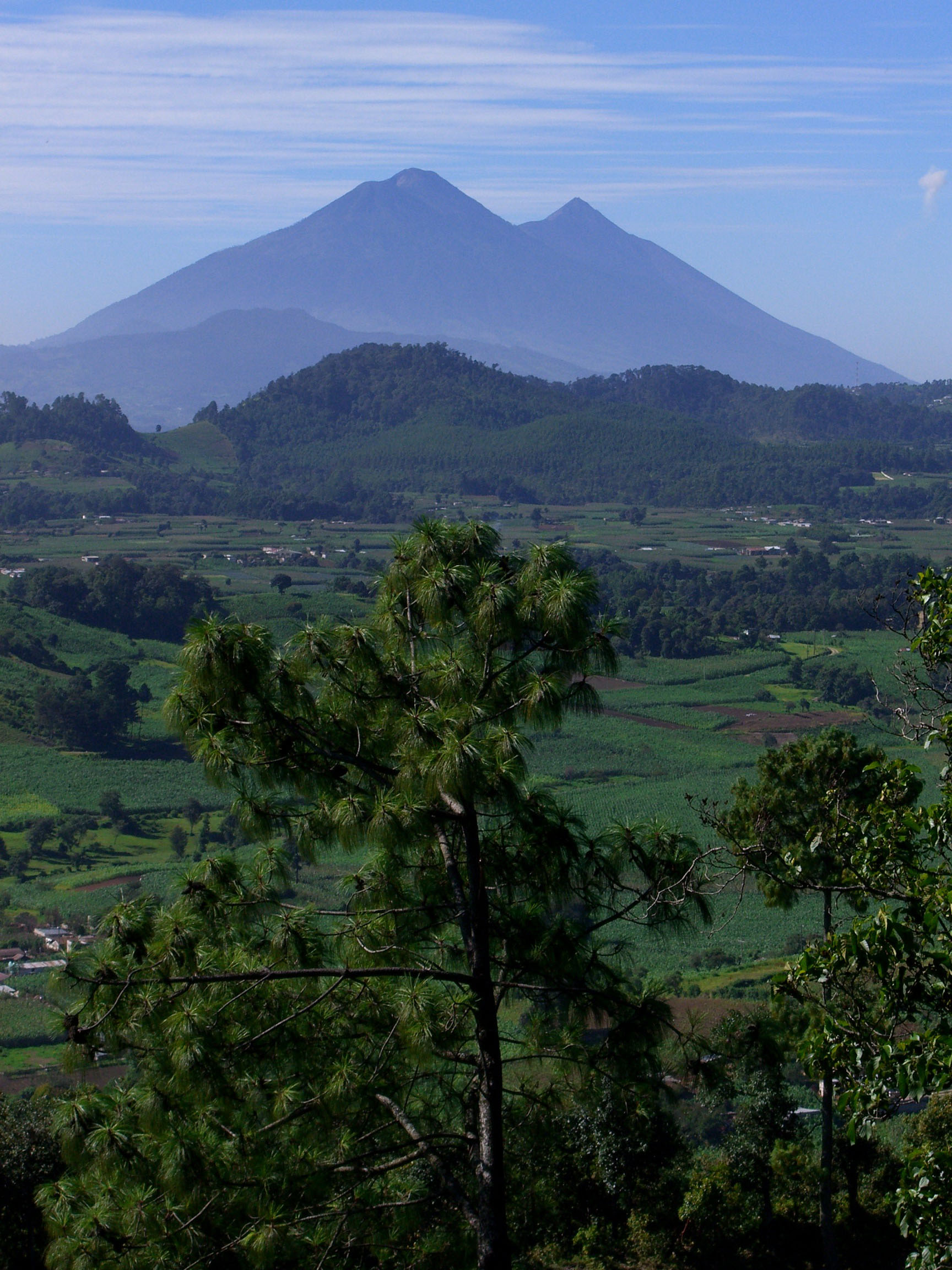
A pine, probably P. pseudostrobus, in Guatemala

=== Europe, Mediterranean, West Asia ===
- Pinus brutia - Turkish pine
- Pinus canariensis - Canary Island pine
- Pinus cembra - Swiss pine
- Pinus halepensis - Aleppo pine
- Pinus heldreichii - Bosnian pine
- Pinus mugo - Mountain pine
- Pinus nigra - European black pine, Austrian pine
- Pinus peuce - Macedonian pine
- Pinus pinaster - Maritime pine
- Pinus pinea - Stone pine
- Pinus sylvestris - Scots pine

=== East Asia, Southeast Asia ===
- Pinus amamiana - Yakushima white pine
- Pinus armandii - Chinese white pine
- Pinus bhutanica - Bhutan white pine
- Pinus bungeana - Lacebark pine
- Pinus dalatensis - Vietnamese white pine
- Pinus densata - Sikang pine
- Pinus densiflora - Korean red pine
- Pinus fenzeliana - Hainan white pine
- Pinus hwangshanensis - Huangshan pine
- Pinus kesiya - Khasi pine
- Pinus koraiensis - Korean pine
- Pinus krempfii - Krempf's pine
- Pinus latteri - Tenasserim pine
- Pinus luchuensis - Luchu pine
- Pinus massoniana - Masson's pine
- Pinus merkusii - Sumatran pine
- Pinus morrisonicola - Taiwan white pine
- Pinus parviflora - Japanese white pine
- Pinus pumila - Siberian dwarf pine
- Pinus roxburghii - Chir pine
- Pinus sibirica - Siberian pine
- Pinus squamata - Qiaojia pine
- Pinus tabuliformis - Chinese red pine
- Pinus taiwanensis - Taiwan red pine
- Pinus thunbergii - Japanese black pine
- Pinus wallichiana - Blue pine or Bhutan pine
- Pinus wangii (syn. P. kwangtungensis) - Guangdong white pine
- Pinus yunnanensis - Yunnan pine

== New World ==
=== Eastern Canada, Eastern United States ===
The pines of this region include:

- Pinus banksiana - Jack pine
- Pinus clausa - Sand pine
- Pinus echinata - Shortleaf pine
- Pinus elliottii - Slash pine
- Pinus glabra - Spruce pine
- Pinus palustris - Longleaf pine
- Pinus pungens - Table Mountain pine
- Pinus resinosa - Red pine
- Pinus rigida - Pitch pine
- Pinus serotina - Pond pine
- Pinus strobus - Eastern white pine
- Pinus taeda - Loblolly pine
- Pinus virginiana - Virginia pine

=== Western Canada, Western United States, Northern Mexico ===
- Pinus albicaulis - Whitebark pine
- Pinus aristata - Rocky Mountains bristlecone pine
- Pinus attenuata - Knobcone pine
- Pinus balfouriana - Foxtail pine
- Pinus contorta - Lodgepole pine
- Pinus coulteri - Coulter pine
- Pinus edulis - Colorado pinyon
- Pinus flexilis - Limber pine
- Pinus jeffreyi - Jeffrey pine
- Pinus lambertiana - Sugar pine
- Pinus longaeva - Great Basin bristlecone pine
- Pinus monophylla - Single-leaf pinyon
- Pinus monticola - Western white pine
- Pinus muricata - Bishop pine
- Pinus ponderosa (syn. P. washoensis) - Ponderosa pine
- Pinus radiata - Monterey pine, radiata pine
- Pinus remota - Texas pinyon, papershell pinyon
- Pinus sabineana - Gray pine, foothill pine, digger pine
- Pinus strobiformis - Southwestern white pine
- Pinus torreyana - Torrey pine

=== Southwestern United States, Mexico, Central America, Caribbean ===
- Pinus arizonica - Arizona pine
- Pinus ayacahuite - Mexican white pine
- Pinus caribaea - Caribbean pine
- Pinus cembroides - Mexican pinyon
- Pinus chiapensis - Chiapas white pine
- Pinus cooperi - Cooper's pine
- Pinus cubensis - Cuban pine
- Pinus culminicola - Potosi pinyon
- Pinus devoniana (syn. P. michoacana) - Michoacan pine
- Pinus durangensis - Durango pine
- Pinus engelmannii - Apache pine
- Pinus gordoniana - Douglas pine
- Pinus greggii - Gregg's pine
- Pinus hartwegii - Hartweg's pine
- Pinus herrerae - Herrera's pine
- Pinus jaliscana - Jalisco pine
- Pinus johannis - Johann's pinyon
- Pinus lawsonii - Lawson's pine
- Pinus leiophylla - Chihuahua pine
- Pinus lumholtzii - Lumholtz's pine
- Pinus luzmariae
- Pinus maximartinezii - Big-cone pinyon
- Pinus maximinoi (syn. P. tenuifolia) - Thinleaf pine
- Pinus montezumae - Montezuma pine
- Pinus nelsonii - Nelson's pinyon
- Pinus occidentalis - Hispaniolan pine
- Pinus oocarpa - Egg-cone pine
- Pinus patula - Patula pine
- Pinus orizabensis - Orizaba pinyon
- Pinus pinceana - Weeping pinyon
- Pinus praetermissa - McVaugh's pine
- Pinus pringlei - Pringle's pine
- Pinus pseudostrobus - Smooth-bark Mexican pine
- Pinus quadrifolia - Parry pinyon
- Pinus rzedowskii - Rzedowski's pine
- Pinus strobiformis - Chihuahua white pine
- Pinus tecunumanii - Tecun Uman pine
- Pinus teocote - Teocote pine
- Pinus tropicalis - Tropical pine
