= El Coahuilón =

Mountain in Coahuila, Mexico

- Location within Mexico

Highest point
- Elevation: 3,575 m (11,729 ft)

Geography
- Location: Arteaga; Coahuila, Mexico
- Parent range: Sierra Madre Oriental

El Coahuilón is a mountain located in the municipalities of Arteaga; Coahuila and Rayones; Nuevo León, Mexico; to the northeast of the town Mesa de las Tablas. The mountain is part of the Sierra Madre Oriental. Its altitude is 3,575 meters above sea level, it is the third highest mountain in Coahuila, after Cerro de la Viga and Sierra de la Marta.

The ridge is approximately 22 km long with an east–west orientation, similar to others in the area. In May 1975 and in May 1998, wildfires damaged a large portion of the mountain. The reforestation efforts have yielded results, but the forest will take several decades to recover fully.

The northern slope is covered by coniferous forests with pine, fir, oaks and other species of evergreen trees and evergreen shrubs; such as Mexican White Pine Pinus ayacahuite, Hartweg's Pine Pinus hartwegii, Mexican Pinyon Pinus cembroides and Potosi Pinyon Pinus culminicola. The southern slope es covered by xeric shrubs.
