= List of species of pine trees in Romania =

The following is a list of pine trees in Romania:

- Picea abies
- Pinus cembra
- Pinus mugo
- Pinus nigra
- Pinus pinea
- Pinus sylvestris

== See also ==
- Pines of Denmark
- List of pines by region
