= Astragalus hypoxylus =

Conservation status
- Critically Imperiled (NatureServe)

Scientific classification
- Kingdom: Plantae
- Clade: Tracheophytes
- Clade: Angiosperms
- Clade: Eudicots
- Clade: Rosids
- Order: Fabales
- Family: Fabaceae
- Subfamily: Faboideae
- Genus: Astragalus
- Species: A. hypoxylus

Binomial name
- Astragalus hypoxylus S.Watson

Species of legume

Astragalus hypoxylus is a rare species of flowering plant in the legume family known by the common name Huachuca milkvetch, or Huachuca Mountain milkvetch. It is endemic to Arizona in the United States, where it is known only from the Patagonia and Huachuca Mountains. There are three populations.

== Description ==
This small perennial herb forms a patch on the ground no more than about 10 cm (3.9 in) wide and 3 to 4 cm (1.2 to 1.6 in) tall. It grows from a fibrous taproot. The alternately arranged leaves are each made up of several pairs of gray-green leaflets which are a few millimeters long. The inflorescence is a flower cluster about 1 cm (0.39 in) wide containing tiny white flowers with purple tips. The flowers bloom in April and May and are pollinated by bees of the genera Anthophora, Bombus, and Osmia. The fruit is a yellow and purple legume pod about 1 cm (0.39 in). This Astragalus looks so different from other species that it was once classified in a monotypic genus all its own.

This plant grows in woodlands dominated by Emory oak (Quercus emoryi), Mexican blue oak (Q. oblongifolia), alligator juniper (Juniperus deppeana), and Mexican pinyon (Pinus discolor). The substrate is a gravelly soil rich in limestone and metamorphic rock.
