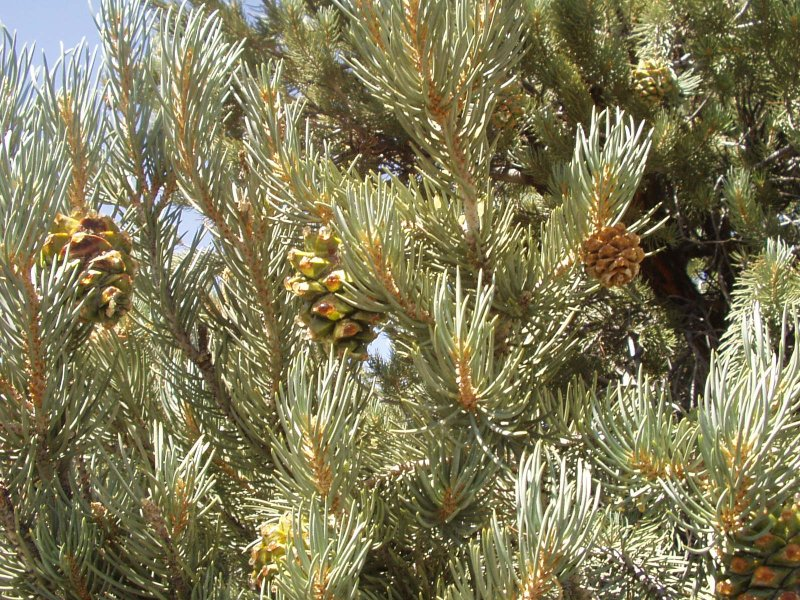
- Single-leaf pinyon (Pinus monophylla)

Scientific classification
- Kingdom: Plantae
- Clade: Tracheophytes
- Clade: Gymnosperms
- Division: Pinophyta
- Class: Pinopsida
- Order: Pinales
- Family: Pinaceae
- Genus: Pinus
- Subgenus: P. subg. Strobus
- Section: P. sect. Parrya
- Subsection: P. subsect. Cembroides; Engelm.

Species
- See text.

= Pinyon pine =

Pinyon pines

Group of conifers

The pinyon (Spanish, piñón) pine group grows in southwestern North America, especially in New Mexico, Colorado, Arizona, and Utah, with the single-leaf pinyon pine just reaching into southern Idaho. The trees yield edible nuts, which are a staple food of Native Americans, and widely eaten as a snack and as an ingredient in New Mexican cuisine. The name comes from the Spanish pino piñonero, a name used for both the American varieties and the stone pine common in Spain, which also produces edible nuts typical of Mediterranean cuisine. Harvesting techniques of the prehistoric American Indians are still used today to collect the pinyon seeds for personal use or for commercialization. The pinyon nut or seed is high in fats and calories. In the western United States, pinyon pines are often found in pinyon–juniper woodlands.

Pinyon pine trees are also known to influence the soil in which they grow by increasing concentrations of both macronutrients and micronutrients.

Some of the species are known to hybridize, the most notable ones being P. quadrifolia with P. monophylla, and P. edulis with P. californiarum; the latter is named P. × kohae (syn. P. edulis var. fallax).

The two-needle piñón (Pinus edulis) is the official state tree of New Mexico.

== Evolutionary history ==
The evolutionary origins of the piñóns appear to coincide with the Laramide Orogeny.

== Species ==
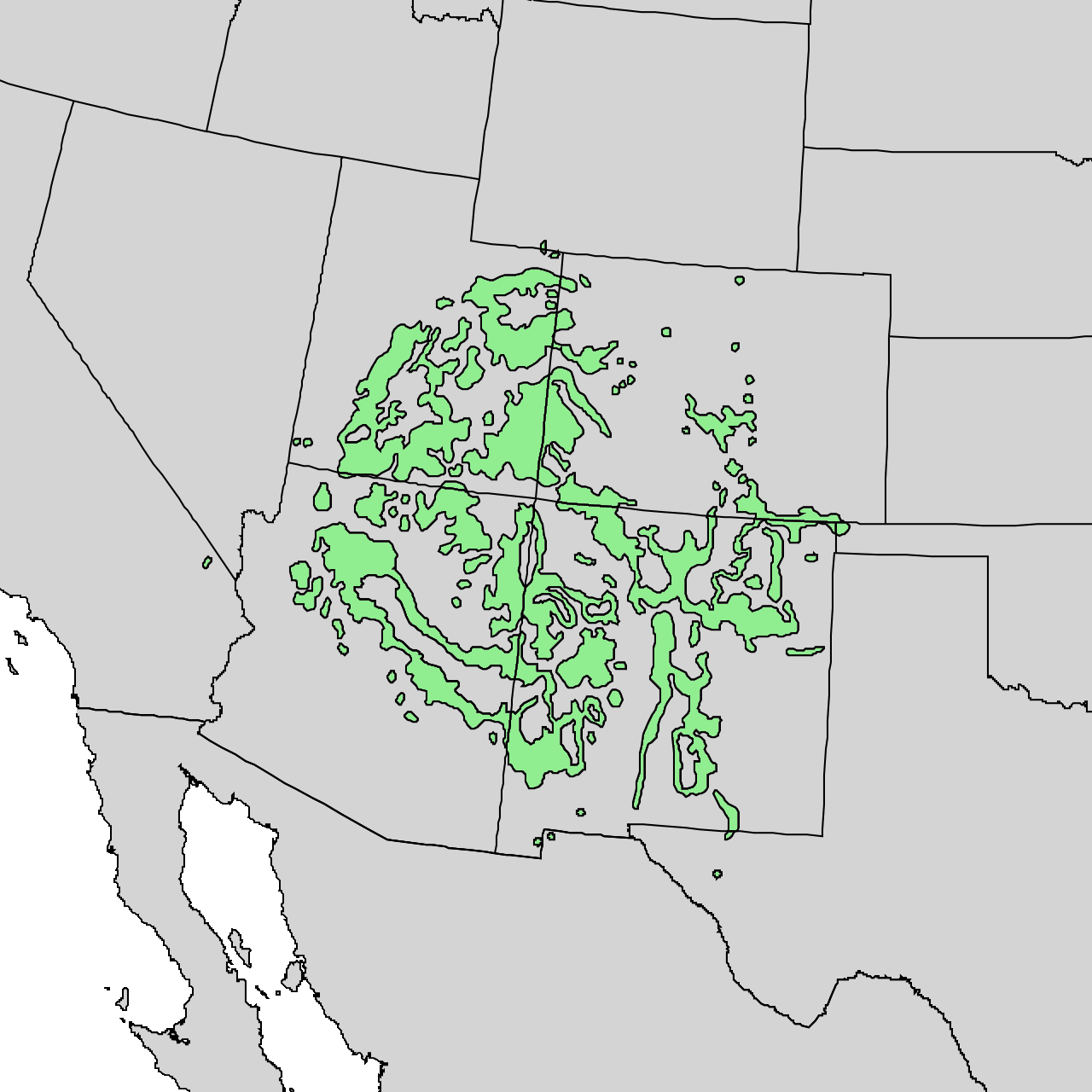
Range of the two-needle piñón, one of the two most important species in the United States

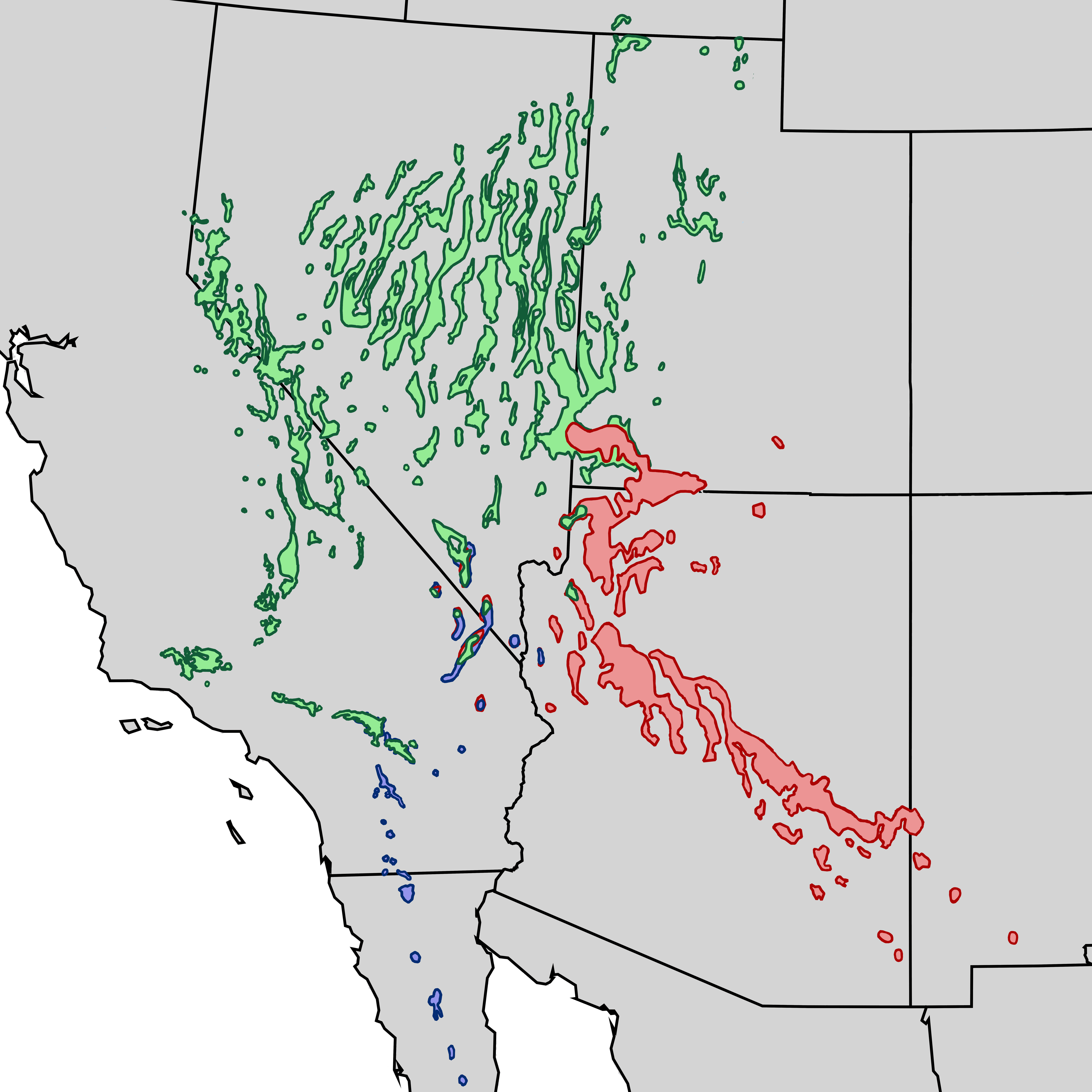
Range of the three subspecies of the single-leaf pinyon

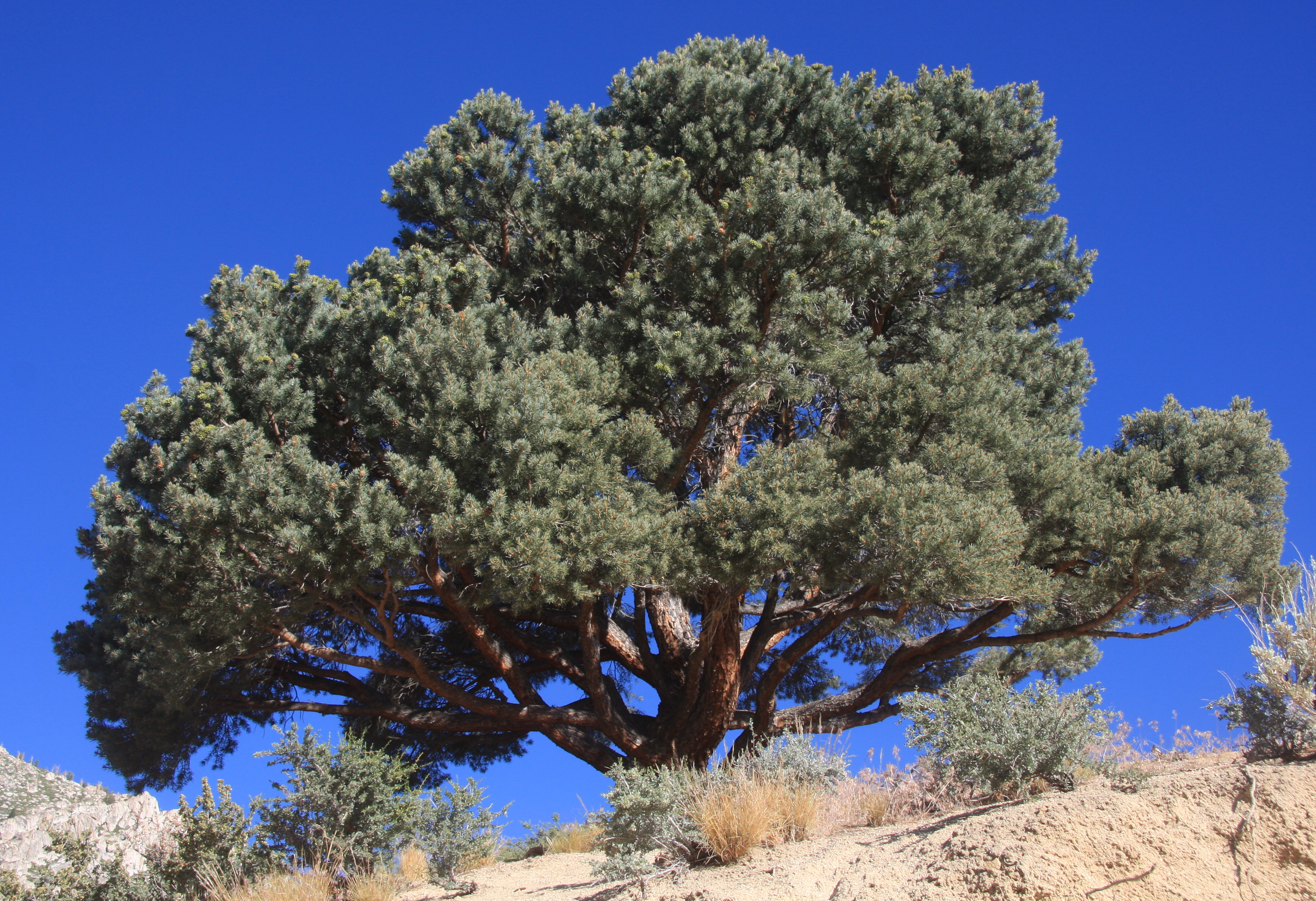
A single-leaf pinyon from Mono County, California. The short stature and rounded crown are typical of the pinyon.

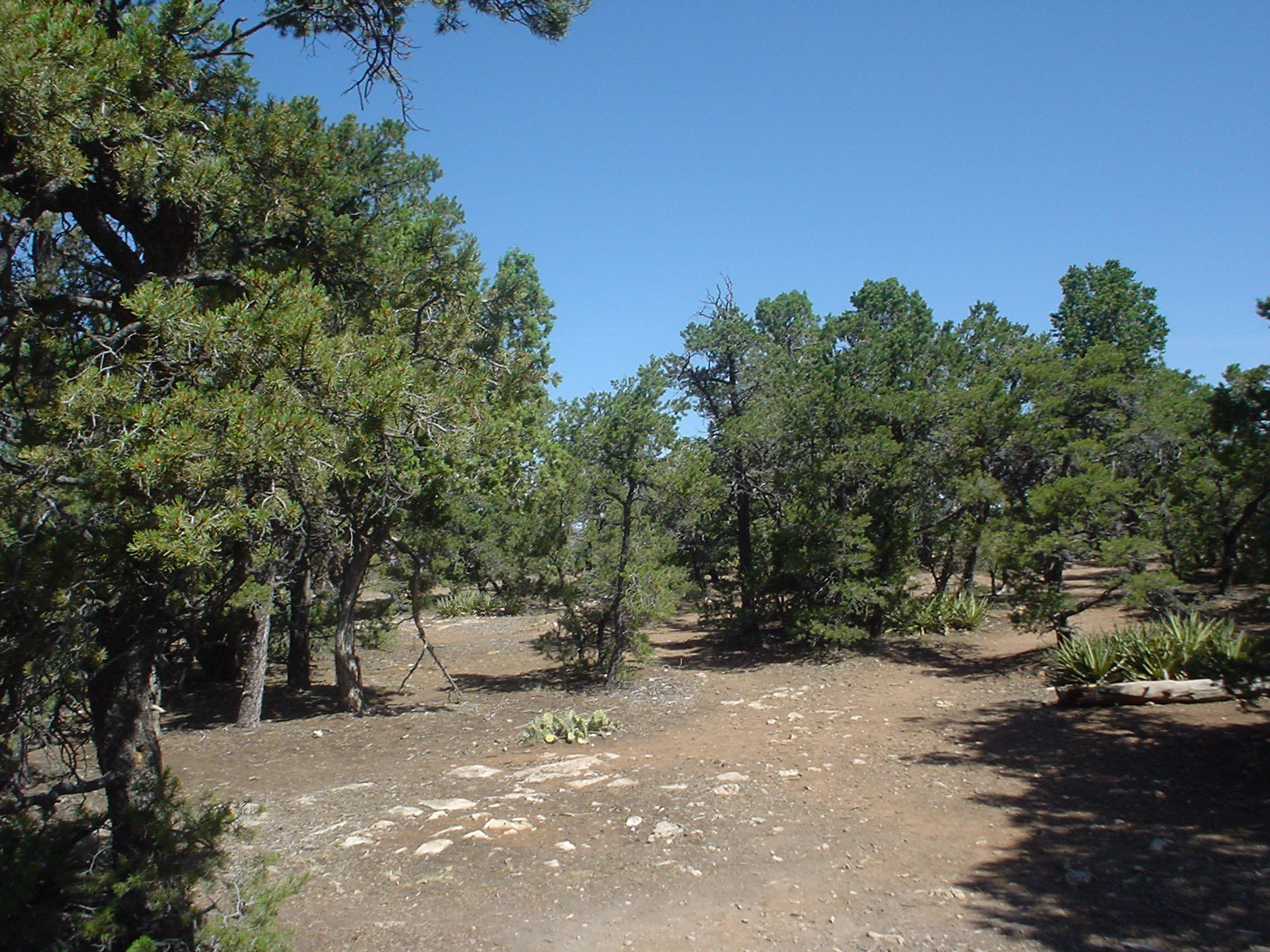
A forest of two-needle piñóns in Grand Canyon National Park, Arizona

Genetic differentiation in the pinyon pine has been observed associated to insect herbivory and environmental stress. There are eight species of true pinyon (Pinus subsection Cembroides):

- Pinus cembroides – Mexican pinyon
- Pinus lagunae – Laguna pinyon
- Pinus orizabensis – Orizaba pinyon (syn. P. cembroides subsp. orizabensis)
- Pinus johannis – Johann's pinyon
- Pinus discolor – border pinyon
- Pinus culminicola – Potosi pinyon
- Pinus remota – Texas pinyon or papershell pinyon
- Pinus edulis – two-needle pinyon or Colorado pinyon
- Pinus monophylla – single-leaf pinyon
- Pinus californiarum – California desert pinyon
- Pinus quadrifolia – Parry pinyon (includes P. juarezensis).

These additional Mexican species are also related, and mostly called pinyons:

- Pinus rzedowskii – Rzedowski's pine
- Pinus pinceana – weeping pinyon
- Pinus maximartinezii – big-cone pinyon
- Pinus nelsonii – Nelson's pinyon

The three bristlecone pine species of the high mountains of the southwestern United States are also related to the pinyon pines.

== Food ==
The seeds of the pinyon pine, known as "pine nuts" or piñónes, are an important food for American Indians living in the mountains of the North American Southwest. All species of pine produce edible seeds, but in North America only pinyon produces seeds large enough to be a major source of food.

The pinyon has likely been a source of food since the arrival of Homo sapiens in the Great Basin and American Southwest (Oasisamerica). In the Great Basin, archaeological evidence indicates that the range of the pinyon pine expanded northward after the Ice Age, reaching its northernmost (and present) limit in southern Idaho about 4000 BCE. Early Native Americans undoubtedly collected the edible seeds, but, at least in some areas, evidence of large quantities of pinyon nut harvesting does not appear until about 600 CE. Increased use of pinyon nuts was possibly related to a population increase of humans and a decline in the number of game animals, thereby forcing the Great Basin inhabitants to seek additional sources of food.

The suitability of pinyon seeds as a staple food is reduced because of the unreliability of the harvest. Abundant crops of cones and seeds occur only every two to seven years, averaging a good crop every four years. Years of high production of seed tend to be the same over wide areas of the pinyon range.

=== Traditional method of harvesting ===
In 1878, naturalist John Muir described the Indian method of harvesting pinyon seeds in Nevada. In September and October, the harvesters knocked the cones off the pinyon trees with poles, stacked the cones into a pile, put brushwood on top, lit it, and lightly scorched the pinyon cones with fire. The scorching burned off the sticky resin coating the cones and loosened the seeds. The cones were then dried in the sun until the seeds could be easily extracted. Muir said the Indians closely watched the pinyon trees year-round and could predict the scarcity or abundance of the crop months before harvest time. In 1891, naturalist B. H. Dutcher observed the harvesting of pinyon seeds by the Panamint Indians (Timbisha people) in the Panamint Range overlooking Death Valley, California. The harvesting method was similar to that observed by Muir in Nevada, except that the pinyon seeds were extracted immediately after the cones had been scorched in the brushwood fire.

Both the above accounts described a method of extracting the seeds from the green cones. Another method is to leave the cones on the trees until they are dry and brown, then beat the cones with a stick, knocking the cones loose or the seeds loose from the cones which then fall to the ground where they can be collected. The nomadic hunter-gathering people of the Great Basin usually consumed their pinyon seeds during the winter following harvest; the agricultural Pueblo people of the Rio Grande valley of New Mexico could store them for two or three years in pits.

Each pinyon cone produces 10 to 30 seeds and a productive stand of pinyon trees in a good year can produce 250 pounds (110 kg) on 1 acre (0.40 ha) of land. An average worker can collect about 22 pounds (10.0 kg) of unshelled pinyon seed in a day's work. Production per worker of 22 pounds of unshelled pinyon seeds—more than one-half that in shelled seeds—amounts to nearly 30,000 calories of nutrition. That is a high yield for the effort expended by hunter-gatherers. Moreover, the pinyon seeds are high in fat, often in short supply for hunter-gatherers.

== Relationship with wildlife ==
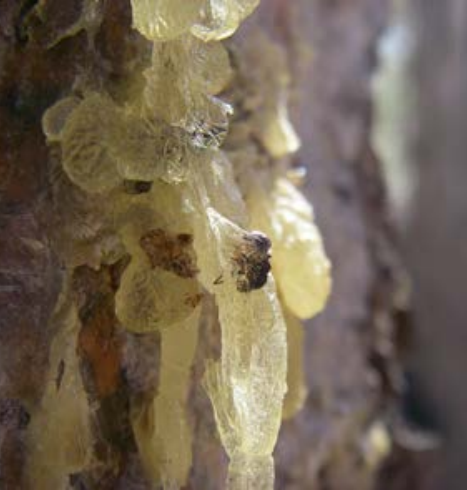
Ips confusus trapped in a glob of sap formed by a pitch tube as a defense mechanism by the pinyon pine

The pinyon jay (Gymnorhinus cyanocephalus) takes its name from the tree, and pinyon nuts form an important part of its diet. It is very important for regeneration of pinyon woods, as it stores large numbers of the seeds in the ground for later use, and excess seeds not used are in an ideal position to grow into new trees. The Mexican jay is also important for the dispersal of some pinyon species, as, less often, is the Clark's nutcracker. Many other species of animal also eat pinyon nuts, without dispersing them.

Ips confusus, known as the pinyon ips, is a bark beetle that kills weak or damaged pinyon pine trees. The beetles feed on the xylem and phloem of the trees. As a defense, the trees flood the holes produced by the beetles with sap.
