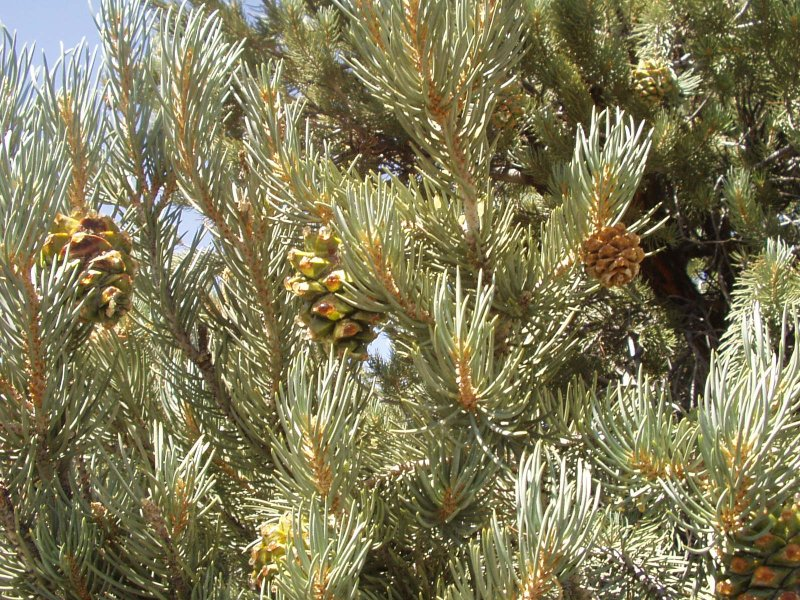
- Single-leaf pinyon (Pinus monophylla subsp. monophylla) leaves and immature cones

Conservation status
- Least Concern (IUCN 3.1)

- Secure (NatureServe)

Scientific classification
- Kingdom: Plantae
- Clade: Tracheophytes
- Clade: Gymnospermae
- Division: Pinophyta
- Class: Pinopsida
- Order: Pinales
- Family: Pinaceae
- Genus: Pinus
- Subgenus: P. subg. Strobus
- Section: P. sect. Parrya
- Subsection: P. subsect. Cembroides
- Species: P. monophylla

Binomial name
- Pinus monophylla Torr. & Frém.
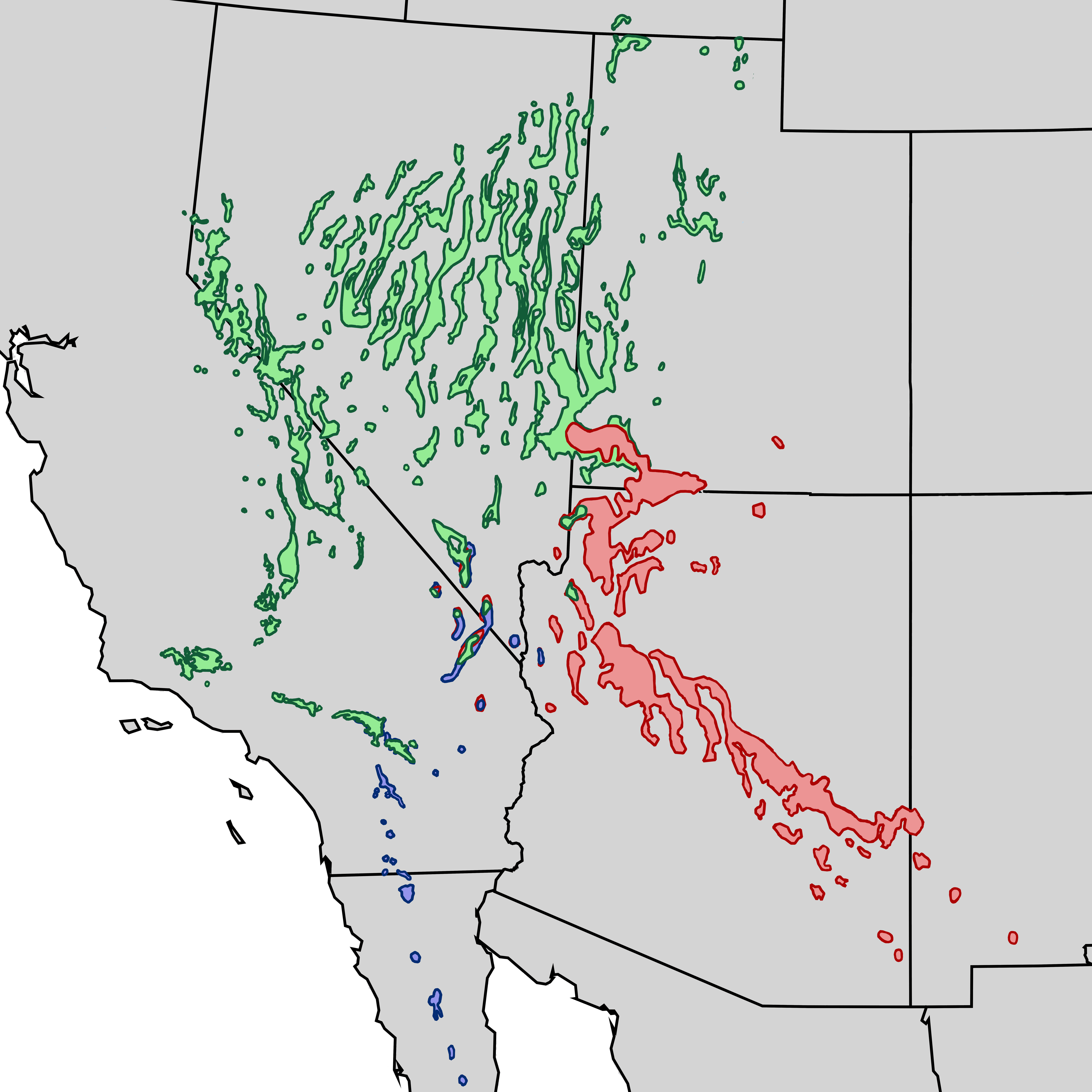
- Natural range: green – Pinus monophylla subsp. monophylla blue – Pinus monophylla subsp. californiarum red – Pinus monophylla subsp. fallax

Synonyms
- List: Caryopitys monophylla (Torr. & Frém.) Rydb.; Pinus cembroides var. monophylla (Torr. & Frém.) Voss; Pinus cembroides subsp. monophylla (Torr. & Frém.) A.E.Murray; Pinus edulis var. monophylla (Torr. & Frém.) Torr.; Pinus fremontiana Endl.

= Pinus monophylla =

Single-leaf pinyon

Pine tree found in North America

Pinus monophylla, the single-leaf pinyon, (alternatively spelled piñon) is a pine in the pinyon pine group, native to North America. The range is in southernmost Idaho, western Utah, Arizona, southwest New Mexico, Nevada, eastern and southern California and northern Baja California.

It occurs at moderate altitudes from 1,200 to 2,300 m (3,900 to 7,500 ft), rarely as low as 950 m (3,120 ft) and as high as 2,900 m (9,500 ft). It is widespread and often abundant in this region, forming extensive open woodlands, often mixed with junipers in the Pinyon-juniper woodland plant community. Single-leaf pinyon is the world's only one-needled pine.

== Description ==
Pinus monophylla is a small to medium size tree, reaching 10–20 m (33–66 ft) tall and with a trunk diameter of up to 80 cm (31 1/2 in) rarely more. The bark is irregularly furrowed and scaly. The leaves ('needles') are, uniquely for a pine, usually single (not two or more in a fascicle, though trees with needles in pairs are found occasionally), stout, 4–6 cm (1 1/2–2 1/4 in) long, and grey-green to strongly glaucous blue-green, with stomata over the whole needle surface (and on both inner and outer surfaces of paired needles). The cones are acute-globose, the largest of the true pinyons, 4.5–8 cm (1 3/4–3 1/8 in) long and broad when closed, green at first, ripening yellow-buff when 18–20 months old, with only a small number of very thick scales, typically 8–20 fertile scales. The cones thus grow over a two-year (26-month) cycle, so that newer green and older, seed-bearing or open brown cones are on the tree at the same time.

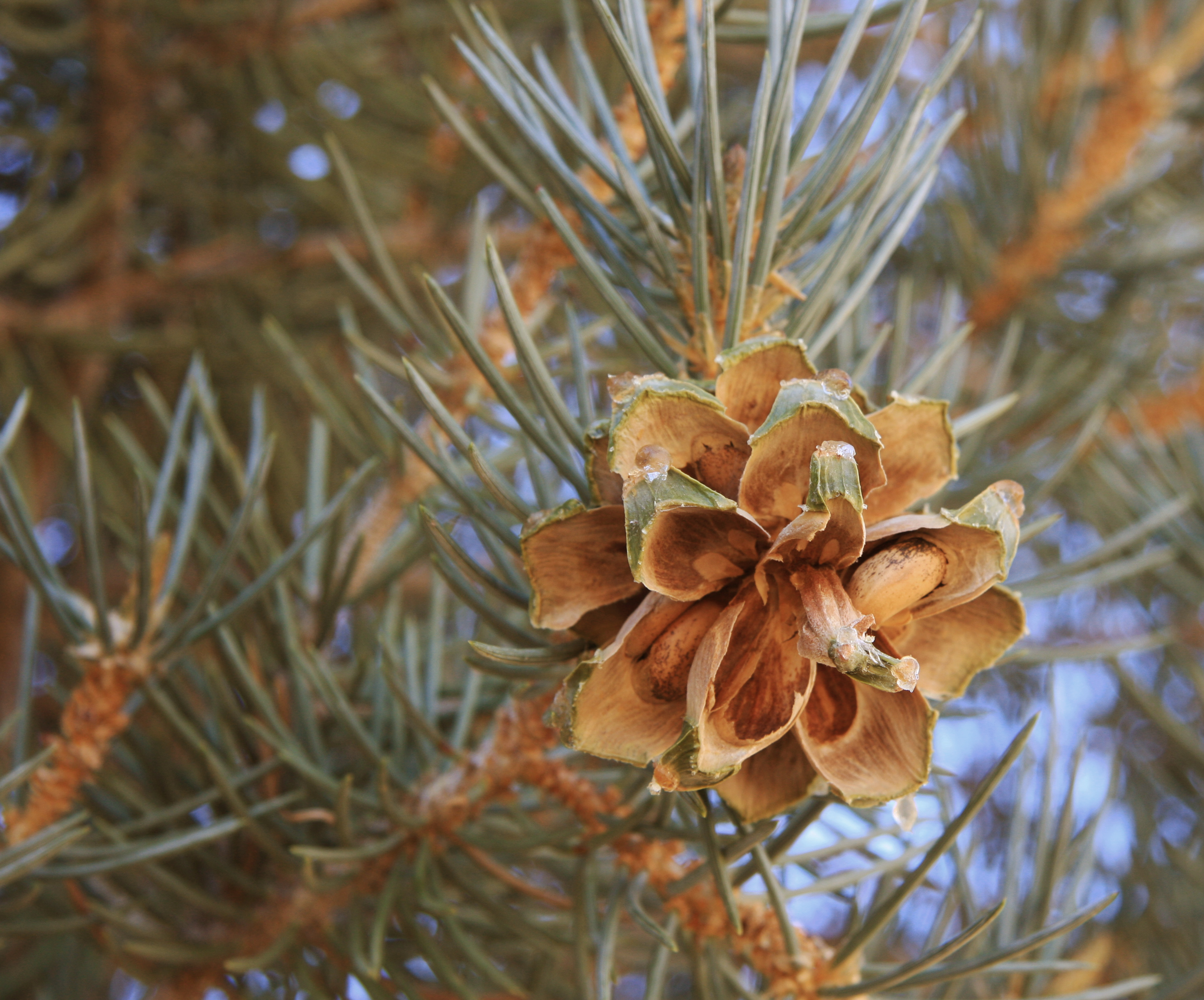
Open cone with empty pine nuts

The seed cones open to 6–9 cm (2 1/4–3 1/2 in) broad when mature, holding the seeds on the scales after opening. The seeds are 11–16 mm (7/16–5/8 in) long, with a thin shell, a white endosperm, and a vestigial 1–2 mm (1/32–3/32 in) wing. Empty pine nuts with undeveloped seeds (self-pollinated) are a light tan color, while the "good" ones are dark brown. The pine nuts are dispersed by the pinyon jay, which plucks the seeds out of the open cones, choosing only the dark ones and leaving the light ones (as in image at right). The jay, which uses the seeds as a food resource, stores many of the seeds for later use by burying them. Some of these stored seeds are not used and are able to grow into new trees. Indeed, Pinyon seeds will rarely germinate in the wild unless they are cached by jays or other animals.

== Taxonomy ==
There are three subspecies:

- Pinus monophylla subsp. monophylla. Most of the range, except for the areas below. Needles more stout, bright blue-green, with 2–7 resin canals and 8–16 stomatal lines. Cones are 5.5–8 cm (2 1/8–3 1/8 in) long, often longer than broad.
- Pinus monophylla subsp. californiarum (D. K. Bailey) Zavarin. Southernmost Nevada, southwest through southeastern California (northwest only as far as the San Jacinto Mountains) to 29°N in northern Baja California. Needles less stout, gray-green, with 8–16 resin canals and 13–18 stomatal lines. Cones are 4.5–6 cm (1 3/4–2 3/8 in) long, broader than long.
- Pinus monophylla subsp. fallax (E. L. Little) D.K. Bailey. Slopes of the lower Colorado River valley and adjacent tributaries from St. George, Utah to the Hualapai Mountains, and along the lower flank of the Mogollon Rim to Silver City, New Mexico. Needles less stout, gray-green, with 2–3 resin canals and 8–16 stomatal lines. Cones are 4.5–6 cm (1 3/4–2 3/8 in) long, broader than long.

It is most closely related to the Colorado pinyon, which hybridises with it (both subsps. monophylla and fallax) occasionally where their ranges meet in western Arizona and Utah. It also (subsp. californiarum) hybridises extensively with Parry pinyon. This classification of pinyon species based only upon the presence of single-needle fascicles is brought into doubt by the reporting of trees from both the Pinus monophylla/Pinus edulis and the Pinus monophylla subsp. fallax/Pinus edulis zones as growing more single needle fascicles after dry years and more two-needled fascicles after wet years.

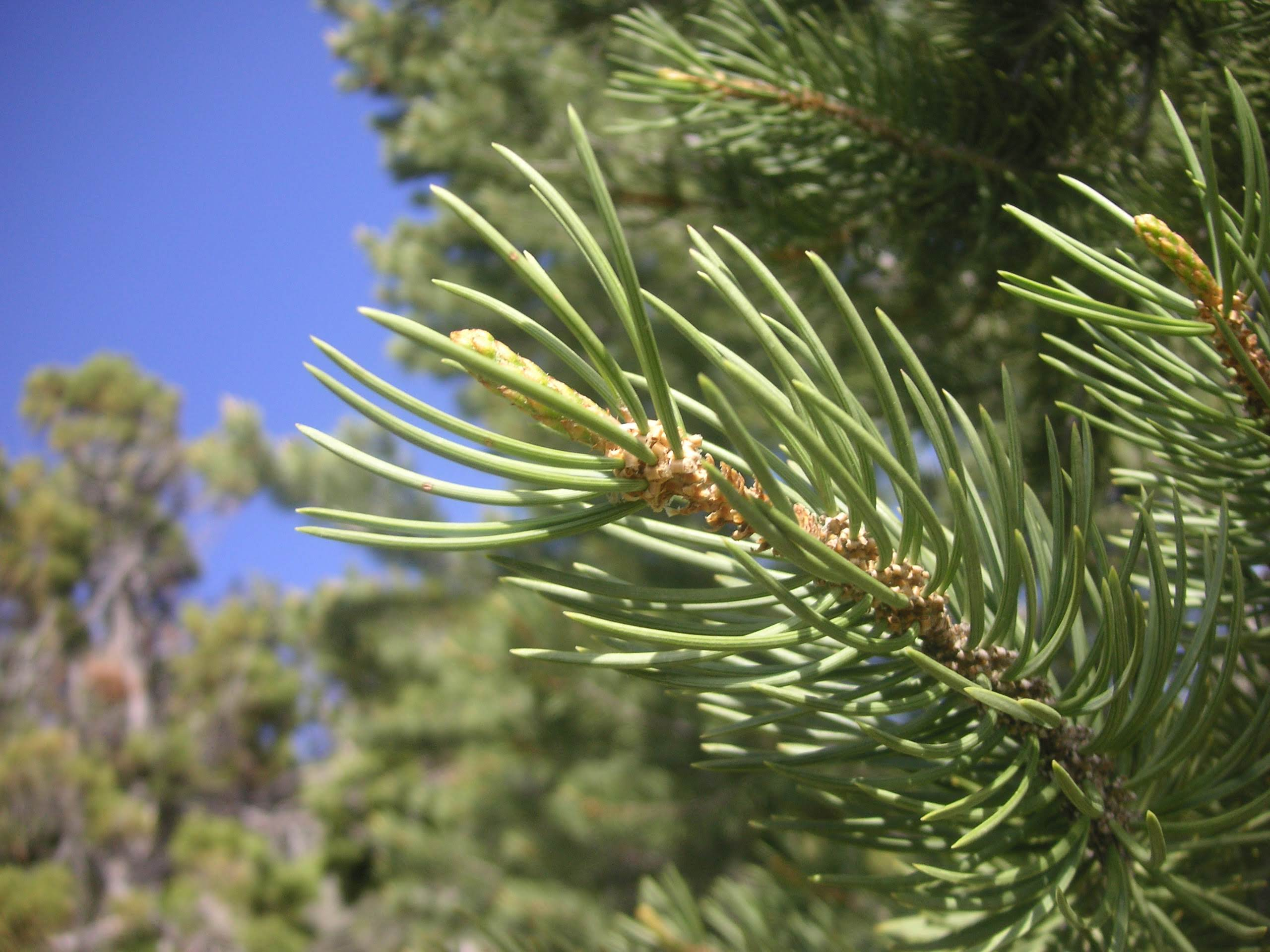
Hybrid individual showing the single-needles of P. monophylla and the two-needles of P. edulis. Logan-Dry canyon ridge, Bear River Range, N. Utah

=== Mojave National Preserve ===
An isolated population of single-leaf pinyon trees in the Mojave Desert's New York Mountains, within the Mojave National Preserve of southeast California, has needles mostly in pairs and was previously thought to be Colorado pinyons. They have recently been shown to be a two-needled variant of single-leaf pinyon from chemical and genetic evidence.

Occasional two-needled pinyons in northern Baja California are hybrids between single-leaf pinyon and Parry pinyon.

=== Prehistoric occurrence ===
Pinus monophylla has been studied with regard to prehistoric occurrence based upon fossil needles found in packrat middens and fossil pollen records. All three of these sub-types of single-needled pinyon have maintained distinctive ranges over the last 40,000 years, although the northerly species (Pinus monophylla) expanded greatly throughout Utah and Nevada since the end of the Pleistocene, 11,700 years ago. The southern California variety has been found to occur within Joshua Tree National Park throughout the last 47,000 years.

== Uses ==
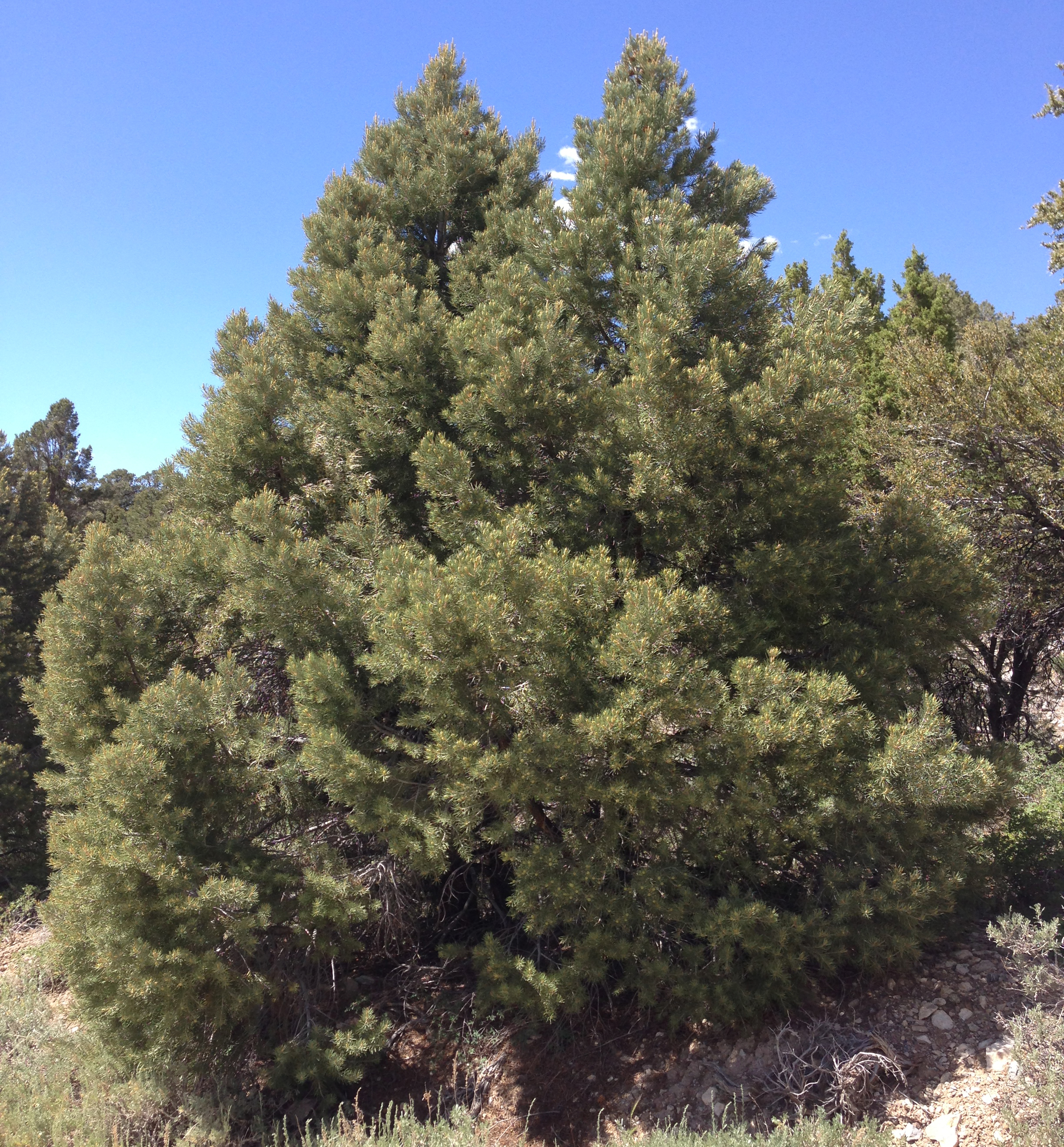
Tree on Spruce Mountain, Nevada, in June

The edible seeds, pine nuts, are collected throughout its range; Native American of the Great Basin region commonly ate them. Various birds and mammals eat the seeds as well. The roasted cones are also edible.

Individuals may harvest the seed for personal use on BLM and Forest Service land.

Single-leaf pinyon is also cultivated as an ornamental tree for native plant, drought tolerant, and wildlife gardens, and for natural landscaping. It is used regionally as a Christmas tree. It is rarely seen in nurseries, because it is difficult to germinate.

=== Deforestation ===
During the mid-nineteenth century, many pinyon groves were cut down to make charcoal for ore-processing, threatening the traditional lifestyle of the Native Americans who depended on them for food. When the railroads penetrated these areas, imported coal supplanted locally produced charcoal.

Following the resulting re-establishment of pinyon woodlands after the charcoal era, many cattle ranchers became concerned that these woodlands provided decreased livestock forage in grazing rangeland. Efforts to clear these woodlands, often using a surplus battleship chain dragged between two bulldozers, peaked in the 1950s, but were subsequently abandoned when no long term forage increase resulted. The habitat destruction of large areas of Pinyon woodlands in the interests of mining and cattle ranching is seen by some as an act of ecological and cultural vandalism.

== In culture ==
In 1959, it was designated Nevada's state tree, later to be joined by the Great Basin Bristlecone Pine. Its description is attributed to American politician and explorer John C. Frémont.

== See also ==
- Pinyon pines
- Pinyon–juniper woodland
