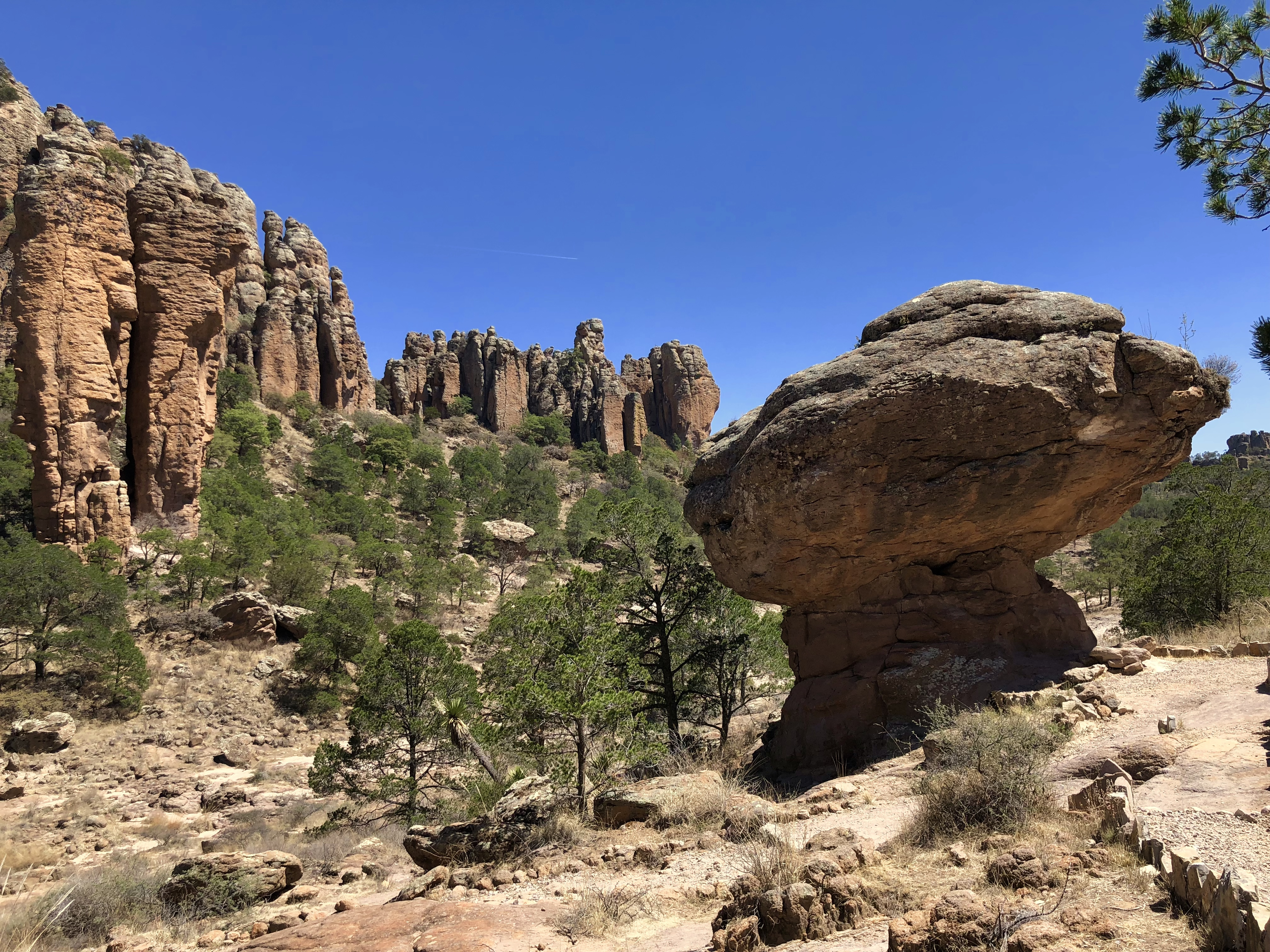
- Mexican pinyon in Sierra de Organos National Park, Sombrerete

Conservation status
- Least Concern (IUCN 3.1)

- Apparently Secure (NatureServe)

Scientific classification
- Kingdom: Plantae
- Clade: Tracheophytes
- Clade: Gymnospermae
- Division: Pinophyta
- Class: Pinopsida
- Order: Pinales
- Family: Pinaceae
- Genus: Pinus
- Subgenus: P. subg. Strobus
- Section: P. sect. Parrya
- Subsection: P. subsect. Cembroides
- Species: P. cembroides

Binomial name
- Pinus cembroides Zucc., 1832

Subspecies
- P. cembroides subsp. cembroides; P. cembroides subsp. orizabensis D.K.Bailey
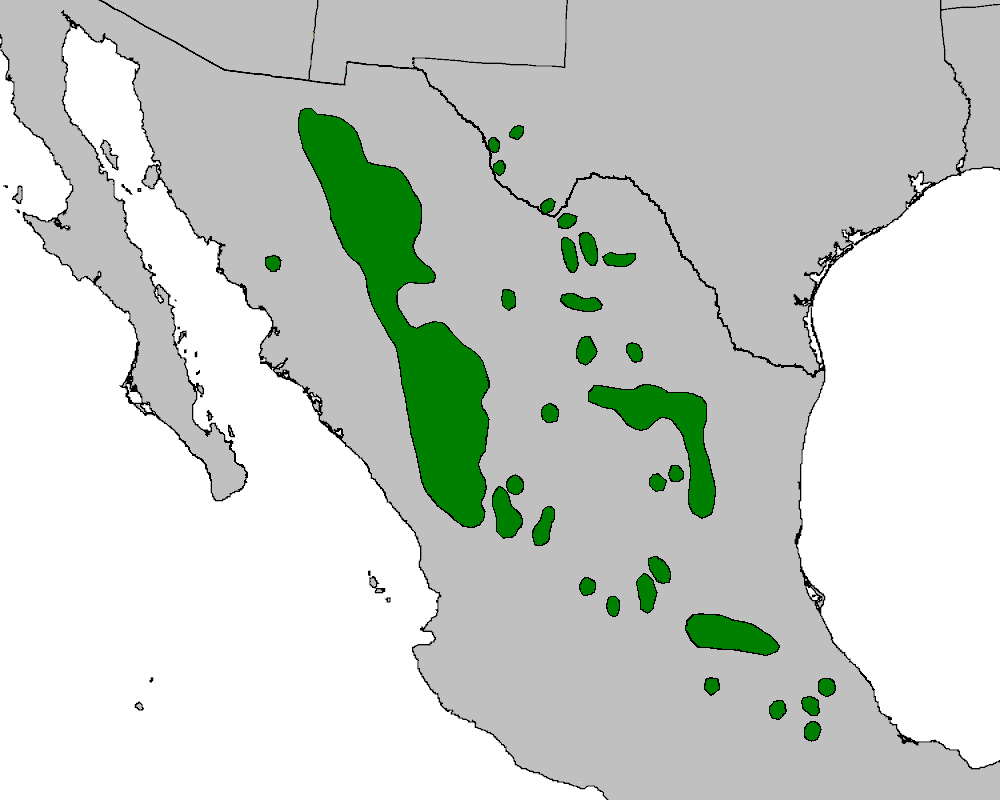
- Natural range

Synonyms
- List: Pinus cembroides var. llaveana (Schiede ex Schltdl.) Voss (1907); Pinus cembroides var. orizabensis (D.K.Bailey) Silba (1990); Pinus llaveana Schiede ex Schltdl. (1838); Pinus orizabensis (D.K.Bailey) D.K.Bailey & Hawksw. (1992); Pinus osteosperma Engelm. (1848)

= Pinus cembroides =

North American species of pine

Pinus cembroides, also known as pinyon pine, Mexican pinyon, Mexican nut pine, and Mexican stone pine, is a pine in the pinyon pine group.

It is a small pine growing to about 20 m (66 ft) with a trunk diameter of up to 50 cm (20 in). It is native to western North America. It grows in areas with low levels of rainfall and its range extends southwards from Arizona, Texas and New Mexico in the United States into Mexico. It typically grows at altitudes between 1,600 and 2,400 m (5,200 and 7,900 ft).

The seeds are large and form part of the diet of the Mexican jay and Abert's squirrel. They are also collected for human consumption, being the most widely used pine nut in Mexico.

== Description ==
Pinus cembroides is a small to medium-size tree, reaching 8 to 20 metres (26 to 66 ft) tall and with a trunk diameter of up to 50 centimetres (20 in). The bark is dark brown, thick and deeply fissured at the base of the trunk. The leaves ('needles') are in mixed pairs and threes, slender, 3 cm (1 1/4 in) to 6 cm (2 1/4 in) long, and dull yellowish green, with stomata on both inner and outer surfaces.

The cones are globose, 3 cm (1 1/4 in) to 4 cm (1 1/2 in) long and broad when closed, green at first, ripening yellow-brown when 18–20 months old, with only a small number of thick scales, with typically 5-12 fertile scales. The cones open to 4 cm (1 1/2 in) to 5 cm (2 in) broad when mature, holding the seeds on the scales after opening. The seeds are 10 mm (3/8 in) to 12 mm (1/2 in) long, with a thick shell, a pink endosperm, and a vestigial 2 mm (1/16 in) wing.

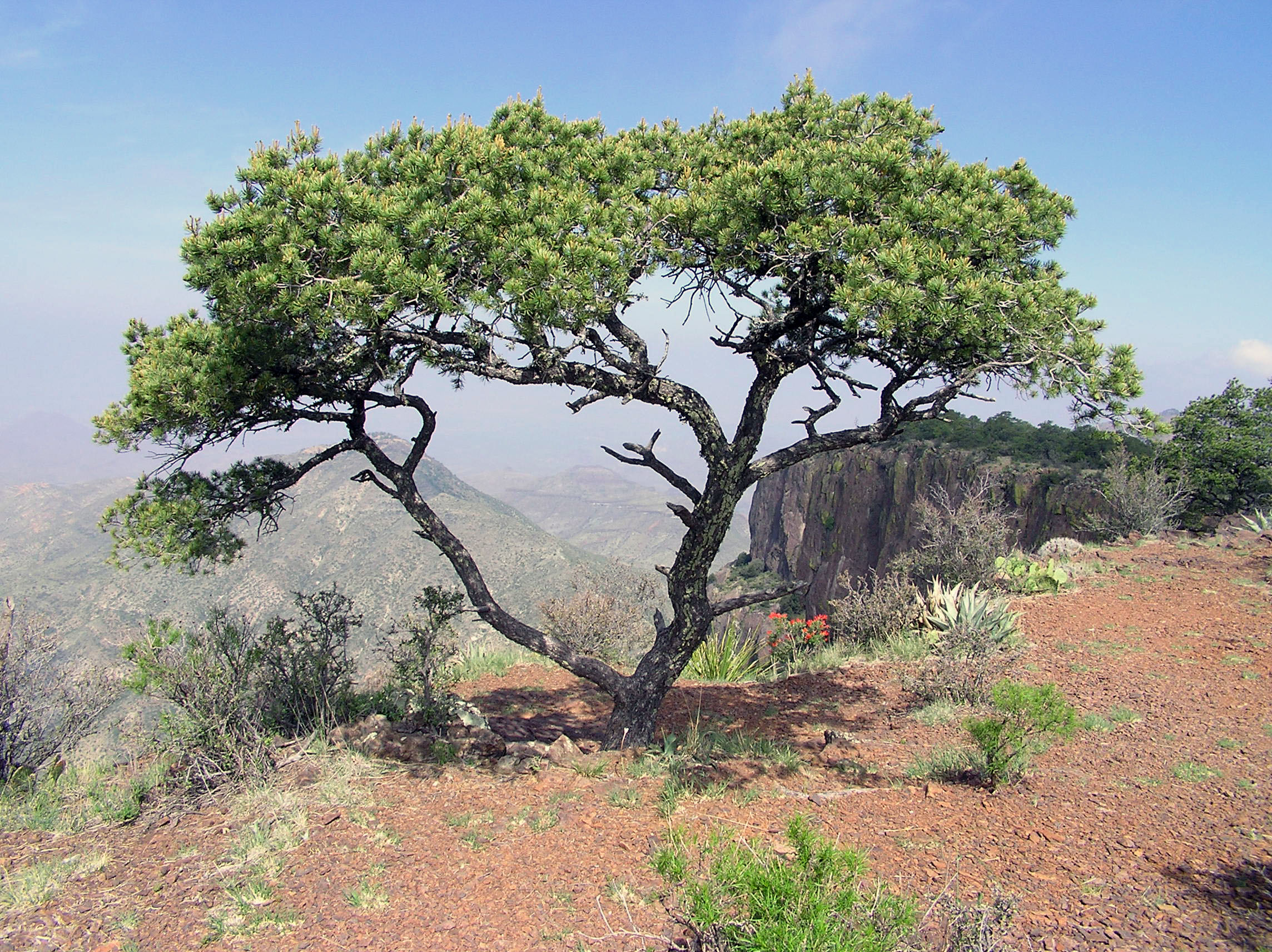
Tree

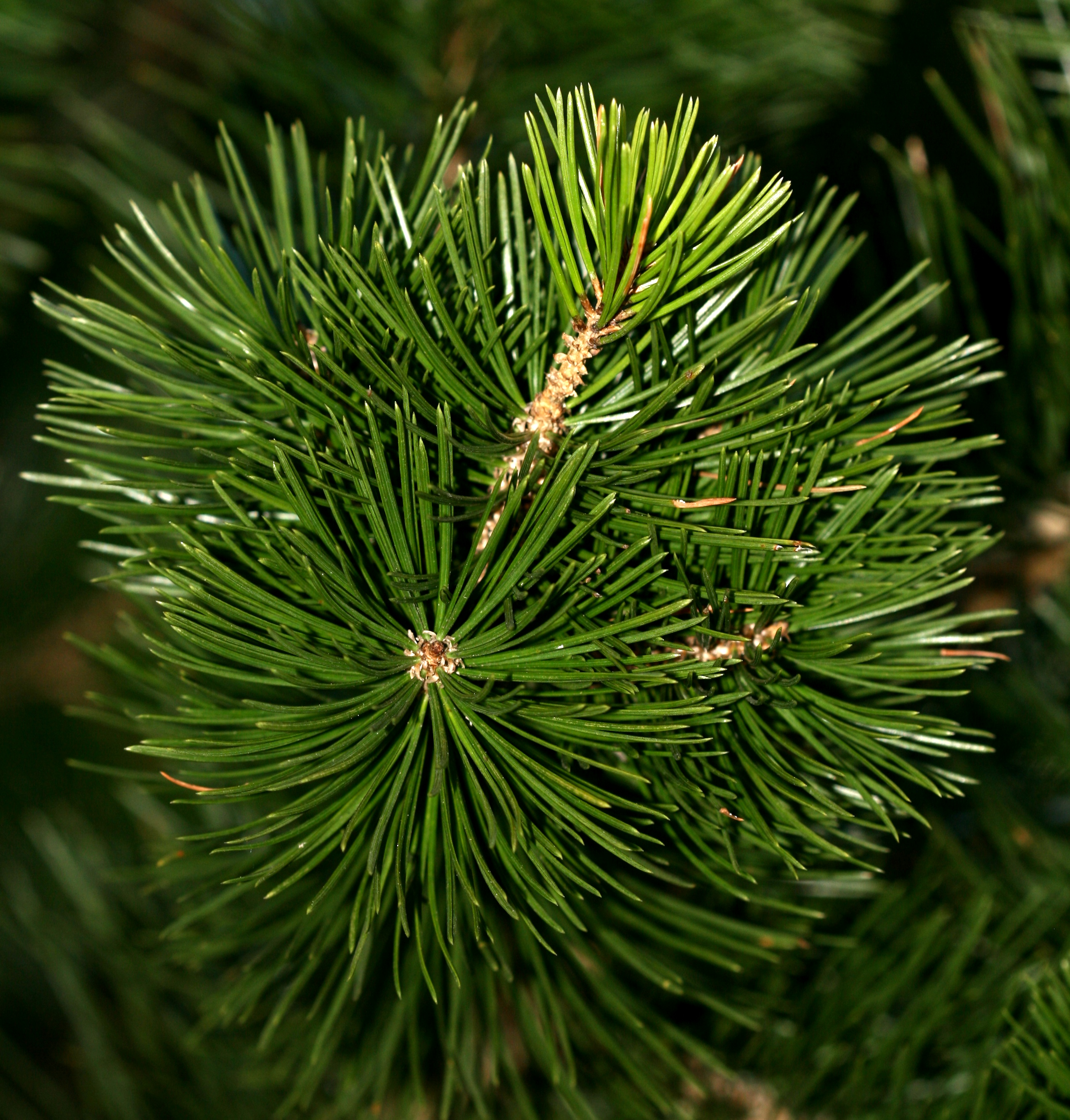
Foliage

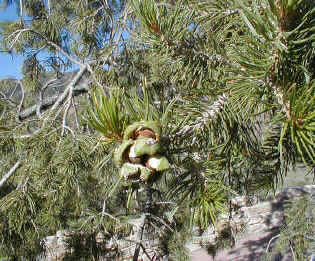
Detail of foliage, cones

== Taxonomy ==
Mexican pinyon was the first pinyon pine described, named by Zuccarini in 1832. Many of the other pinyon pines have been treated as varieties or subspecies of it at one time or another in the past, but research in the last 10–50 years has shown that most are distinct species. Some botanists still include Johann's pinyon and Orizaba pinyon in Mexican pinyon; the former accounts for records of "Mexican pinyon" in southern Arizona and New Mexico.

Mexican pinyon is a relatively non-variable species, with constant morphology over the entire range except for the disjunct population in the Sierra de la Laguna pine-oak forests of Baja California Sur; this is generally treated as a subspecies, Pinus cembroides subsp. lagunae, although some botanists treat it as a separate species, P. lagunae. This subspecies differs from the type in having slightly longer leaves, between 4 cm (1 1/2 in) and 7 cm (2 3/4 in) and longer, narrower cones, up to 5.5 cm (2 1/4 in) long.

== Distribution and habitat ==
The range extends from westernmost Texas, United States (where it is restricted to the Chisos and Davis Mountains), south through much of Mexico, occurring widely along the Sierra Madre Oriental and Sierra Madre Occidental ranges, and more rarely in the eastern Eje Volcánico Transversal range. It lives in areas with little rainfall, which fluctuates between 380 to 640 mm (15 to 25 in).

The subspecies Pinus orizabensis (orizabensis) is found farther south in the state of Veracruz. There is also a disjunct population in the Sierra de la Laguna of southern Baja California Sur. It occurs at moderate altitudes, mostly from 1,600 to 2,400 m (5,200 to 7,900 ft), which some authorities consider a separate species (P. lagunae).

== Ecology ==
The seeds are dispersed by the Mexican jay, which plucks the seeds out of the open cones. The jay, which uses the seeds as a major food resource, stores many of the seeds for later use, and some of these stored seeds are not used and are able to grow into new trees. Abert's squirrel also feeds on the seeds in preference to those of the ponderosa pine.

== Conservation ==
It is a common pine with a wide range and the International Union for Conservation of Nature has rated its conservation status as being of "least concern".

== Uses ==
The seeds are widely collected in Mexico, being the main edible pine nut in the region. While palatable when raw, their flavor is considered to be improved when roasted.
