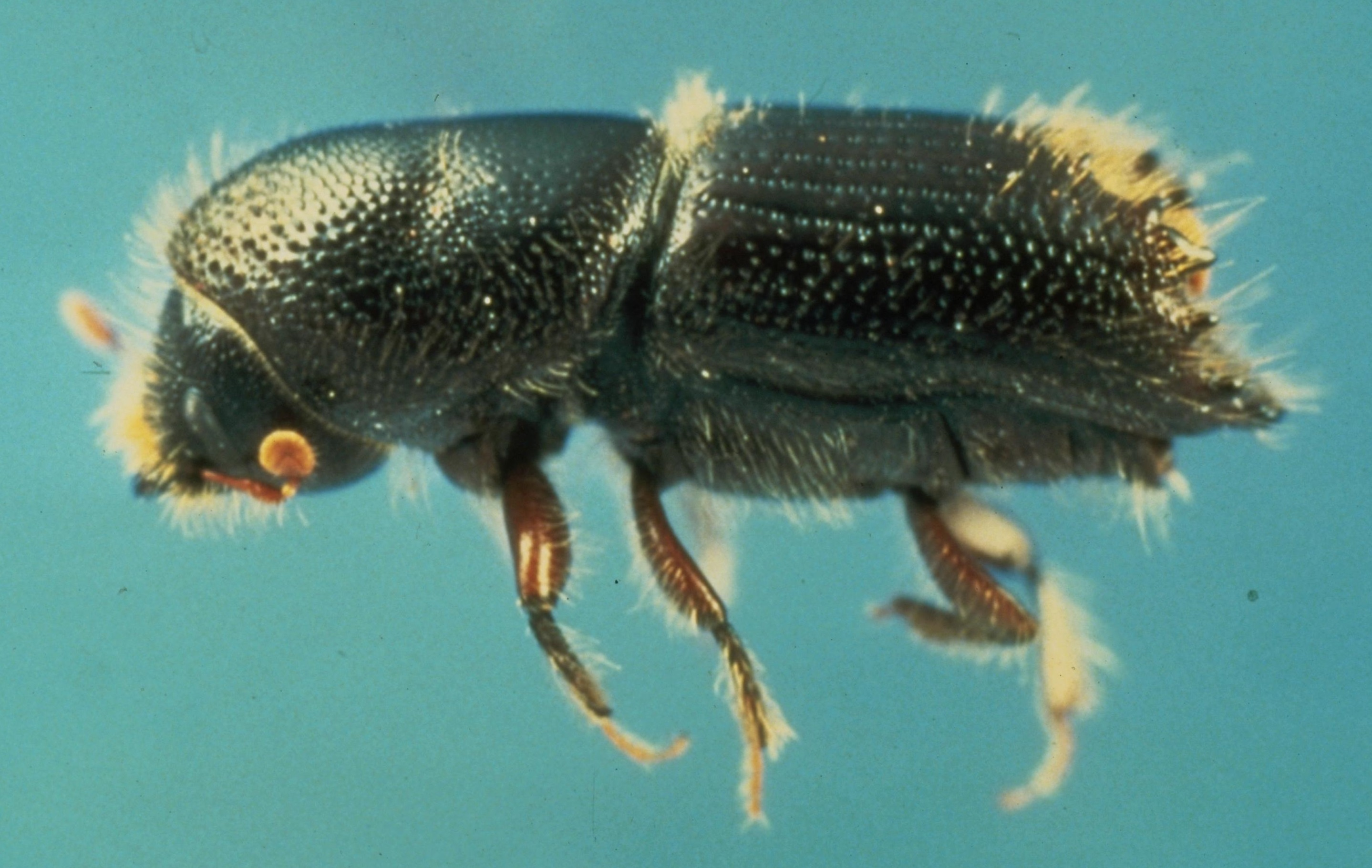
- Ips calligraphus

Scientific classification
- Kingdom: Animalia
- Phylum: Arthropoda
- Class: Insecta
- Order: Coleoptera
- Suborder: Polyphaga
- Infraorder: Cucujiformia
- Family: Curculionidae
- Subfamily: Scolytinae
- Tribe: Ipini
- Genus: Ips; De Geer, 1775

Species
- See text

= Ips (beetle) =

Genus of beetles

Ips is a genus of beetles in the family Curculionidae, the true weevils. They are bark beetles, members of the subfamily Scolytinae. Species are distributed throughout the Northern Hemisphere. Some are known as introduced species in Australia and Africa. Many species are pests of forest trees, especially pines and spruces. They are known commonly as engraver beetles, ips engraver beetles, and pine engravers.

== Description ==
Beetles of this genus are cylindrical in shape, 3 to 6.5 millimeters long, and reddish to black in color. The back end of the elytra is concave, and there is a ridge of three to six large spines on either side of the depression. The number and shape of the spines help to distinguish the species from one another. The genus is distinguished from other groups in the tribe Ipini by the flat, oval shape of the clubs at the tips of the antennae and by details of the concavity in the elytra and of the male genitalia.

The oblong white eggs are up to a millimeter long. The grub-like larvae are whitish with reddish heads and lack legs.

== Biology ==
These bark beetles live in and feed on the phloem in the inner layer of bark on trees. They usually inhabit dead, dying, and stressed trees, including fallen trees, cut logs, and slash. They can be found in trees that are already damaged by drought, lightning, human activity, or pest infestation. They are specialists on conifers, attacking many species of pine (Pinus) and spruce (Picea). Less often, they are found on hemlocks (Tsuga) and firs (Abies).

Most Ips, like most all beetles of the tribe Ipini, have a polygynous mating system with harems of females. Typically, a male establishes a nuptial chamber in a log and produces an aggregation pheromone that attracts both males and females. The males dig additional chambers and each female joins one of the males, digging an extension onto his nuptial chamber where she deposits her eggs. A male may have a harem of up to eight females. Exceptions are I. latidens and I. avulsus, which are monogamous in nature.

The aggregation pheromones usually contain two or more active attractant compounds, such as ipsdienol, ipsenol, and cis-verbenol.

The beetles are called engravers because of the long, grooved galleries they excavate in the sapwood. As the female digs her branch off of the male's nuptial chamber, she deposits eggs in individual niches along the walls. When the larva emerges, it digs a tunnel off of its niche. The multibranched engraved galleries that result are often Y-, H-, or I-shaped. Ips galleries are clear and open, unlike those of some other bark beetles, which are filled with wood dust and frass.

The beetles grow and develop more quickly during the warmer seasons. In the summer, I. grandicollis and I. calligraphus can complete an entire life cycle in 25 days, and there can be up to eight generations per year. I. avulsus can complete a life cycle in just 18 days and have 10 generations per year. After pupation, the new adult beetle disperses from its birthplace and can fly several miles to locate an appropriate host tree in which to breed. Some species overwinter in aggregations inside the galleries, while others seek shelter in the outer bark layers or the leaf litter.

== Effects on trees ==
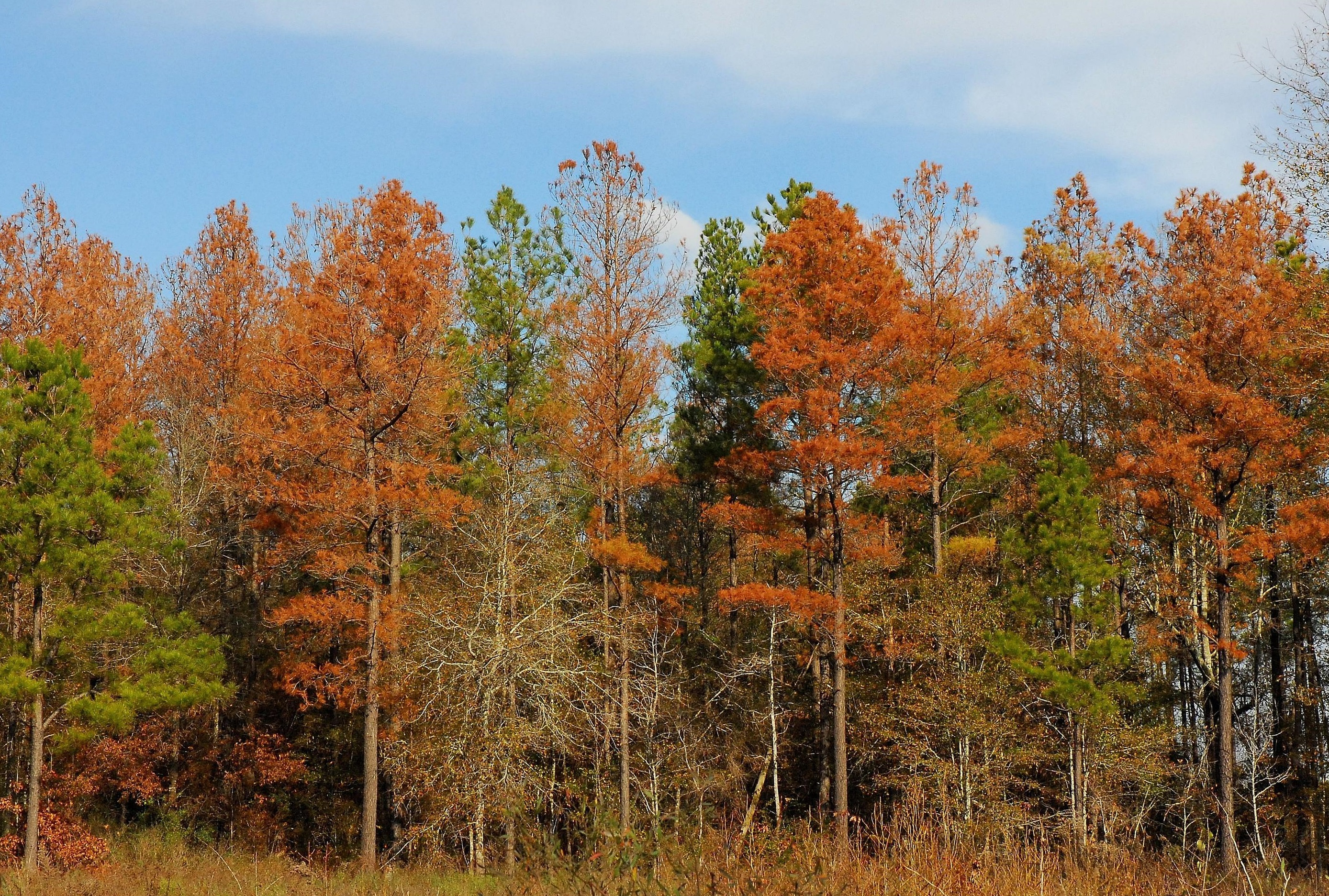
Ips avulsus infestation in loblolly pines (Pinus taeda)

As native species, these beetles are a natural part of their environment, excavating snags and providing food for insectivores. I. typographus is described as "an essential component of every spruce forest ecosystem" as it digs through dead and dying wood tissue, helping to initiate the process of decomposition. In an abundance of dead and dying trees, after windthrow events, for instance, the beetles take advantage of plentiful food and shelter resources and their populations increase drastically. If the resources then dwindle, the large populations move into stands of healthy trees and become a problematic infestation. Their damage is usually not as severe as that of certain beetles in the genus Dendroctonus, which sometimes share the habitat. Ips outbreaks are less common and usually shorter in duration, though severe outbreaks of Ips typographus in Europe in the 1990s inspired many new research studies of ips engravers.

A living tree can be killed by the feeding activity of adults and larvae, which damages the phloem in such a way that the tree is girdled. The beetles also introduce several species of fungi which invade and infect the wood, blocking the xylem. The first sign of an Ips infestation in a tree may be the discoloration of the needles that occurs when fungi block the xylem and prevent water transport to the foliage. Several species of blue stain fungus can be vectored by the beetles, including those of the genera Ophiostoma and Ceratocystis.

Other signs of Ips infestation include particles of wood dust accumulating on the bark, foliage, and nearby objects as a result of the beetles' tunneling activity. The wood dust can mix with resin that bleeds from the injury site, creating whitish or reddish pitch tubes, but these are more common in Dendroctonus infestations. Woodpeckers spend time on infested trees, chipping off bark as they forage for the beetles.

== Management ==
Insecticides are not effective for active Ips infestations. Instead they are used to prevent the beetles' spread to healthy trees, such as landscaping conifers, newly transplanted trees, and healthy stands adjacent to outbreaks. The beetles are attracted to freshly cut wood, so logs and slash are chipped, dried, or removed from vulnerable areas. Infested wood can be chipped, stripped of bark, or solarized in plastic to kill the beetles.

If the sounds of related but different species of beetles, such as western pine beetles and southern pine beetles (which both feed on pinyon but never live together), are played into a tree the beetles present will tear each other apart.

== Taxonomy ==
There are 37 species in the genus. In a 2001 revision it was divided into four subgenera.

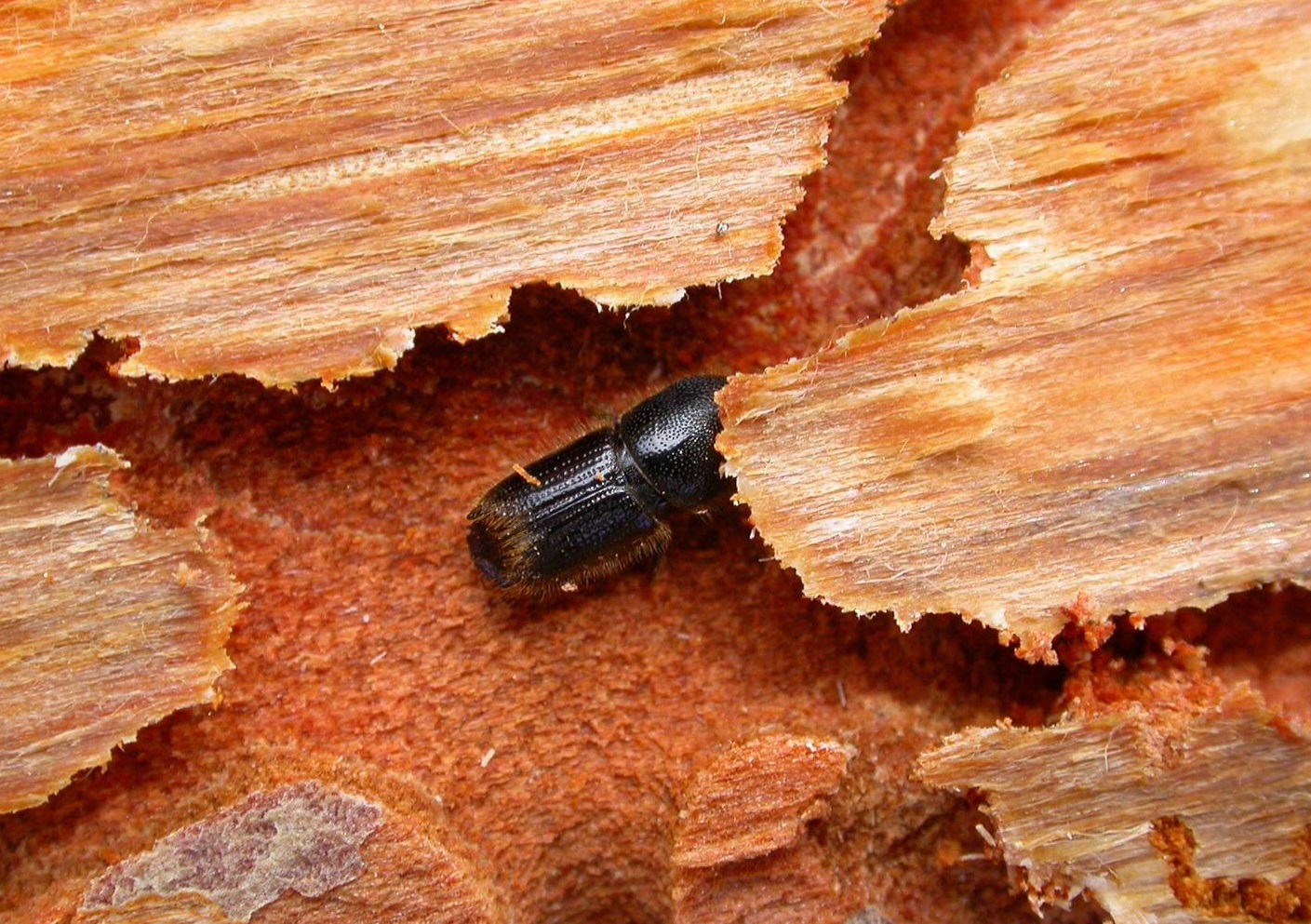
Ips sexdentatus in gallery

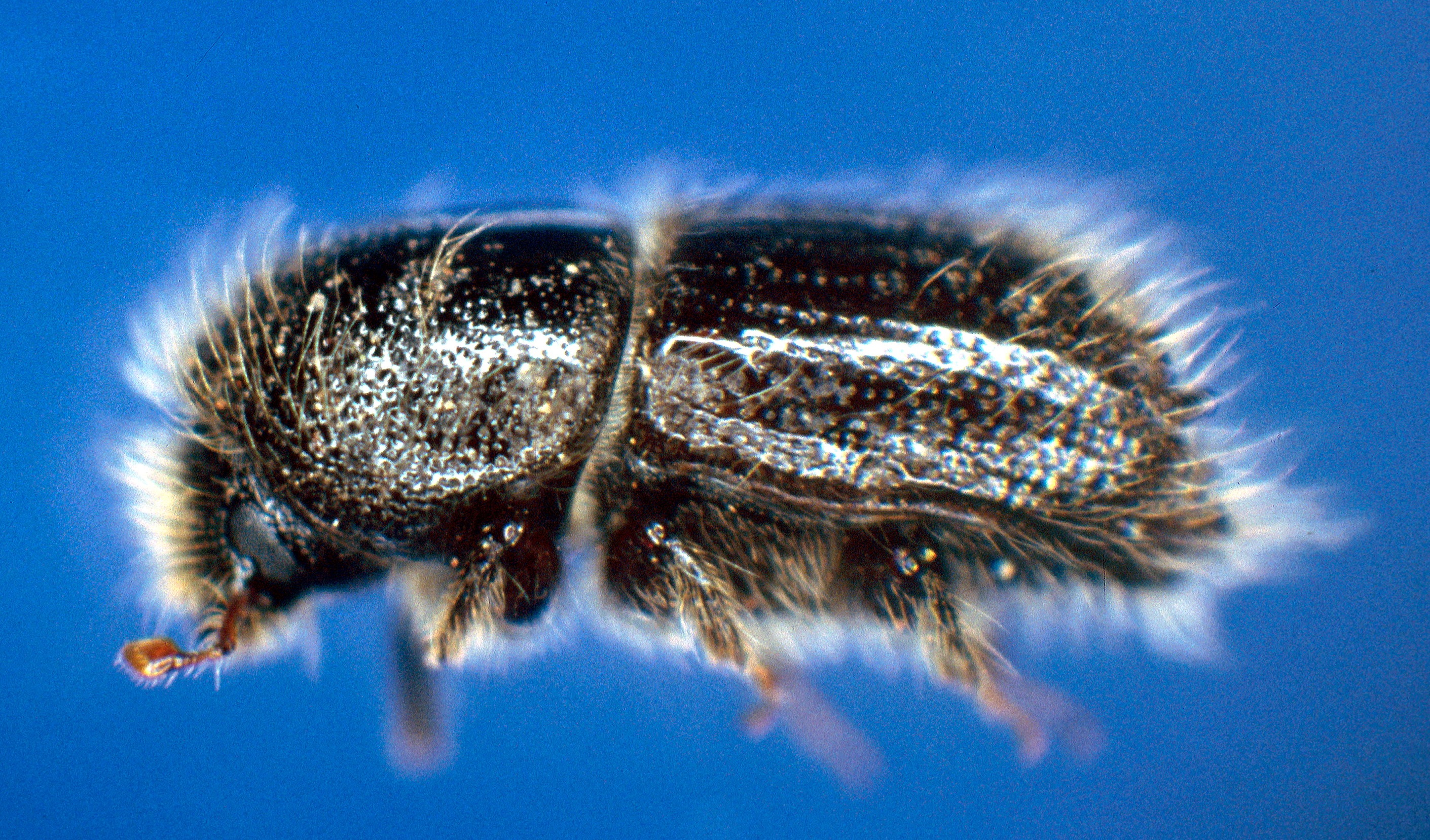
Ips typographus

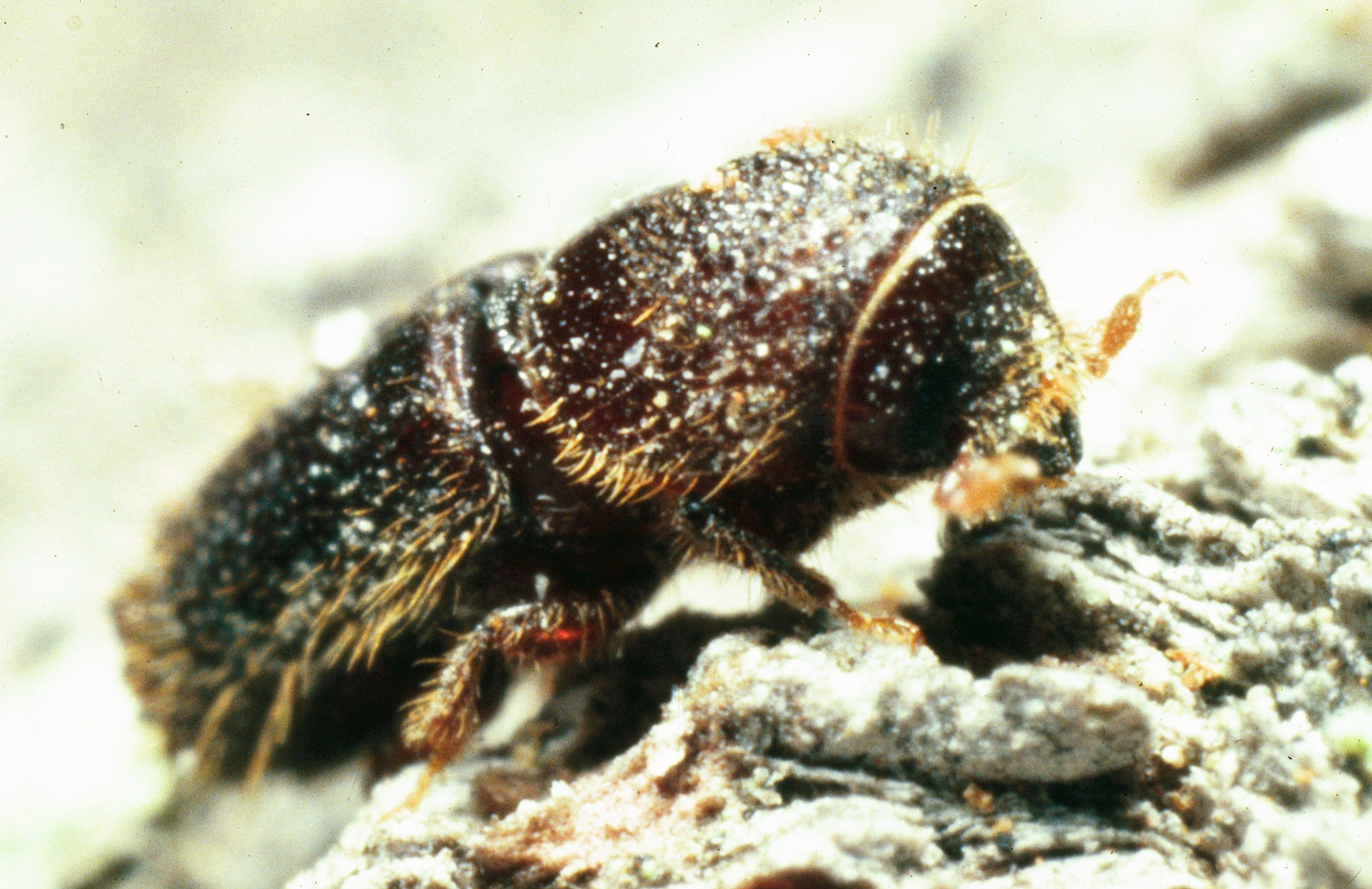
Ips latidens

Species include:

- Ips acuminatus
- Ips amitinus – small spruce bark beetle
- Ips apache
- Ips avulsus – small southern pine engraver
- Ips bonanseai
- Ips borealis – northern engraver
- Ips calligraphus – sixspined ips
- Ips cembrae – larger pine scolytid
- Ips chinensis
- Ips confusus – piñon ips, often confused with Ips paraconfusus
- Ips cribricollis
- Ips duplicatus – northern bark beetle
- Ips emarginatus – emarginate ips
- Ips grandicollis – eastern fivespined ips
- Ips hauseri – Kyrgyz mountain engraver
- Ips hoppingi
- Ips hunteri
- Ips integer
- Ips knausi
- Ips lecontei – Arizona fivespined ips
- Ips longifolia
- Ips montanus
- Ips nitidus – Qinghai spruce bark beetle
- Ips paraconfusus – California fivespined ips, often confused with Ips confusus
- Ips perroti
- Ips perturbatus – northern spruce engraver
- Ips pilifrons
- Ips pini – pine engraver
- Ips plastographus
- Ips schmutzenhoferi
- Ips sexdentatus
- Ips shangrila
- Ips stebbingi
- Ips subelongatus – oblong bark beetle
- Ips tridens
- Ips typographus – European spruce bark beetle
- Ips woodi

Genus Pseudips contains three species transferred from Ips in 2000: P. concinnus, P. mexicanus, and P. orientalis.

== Gallery ==
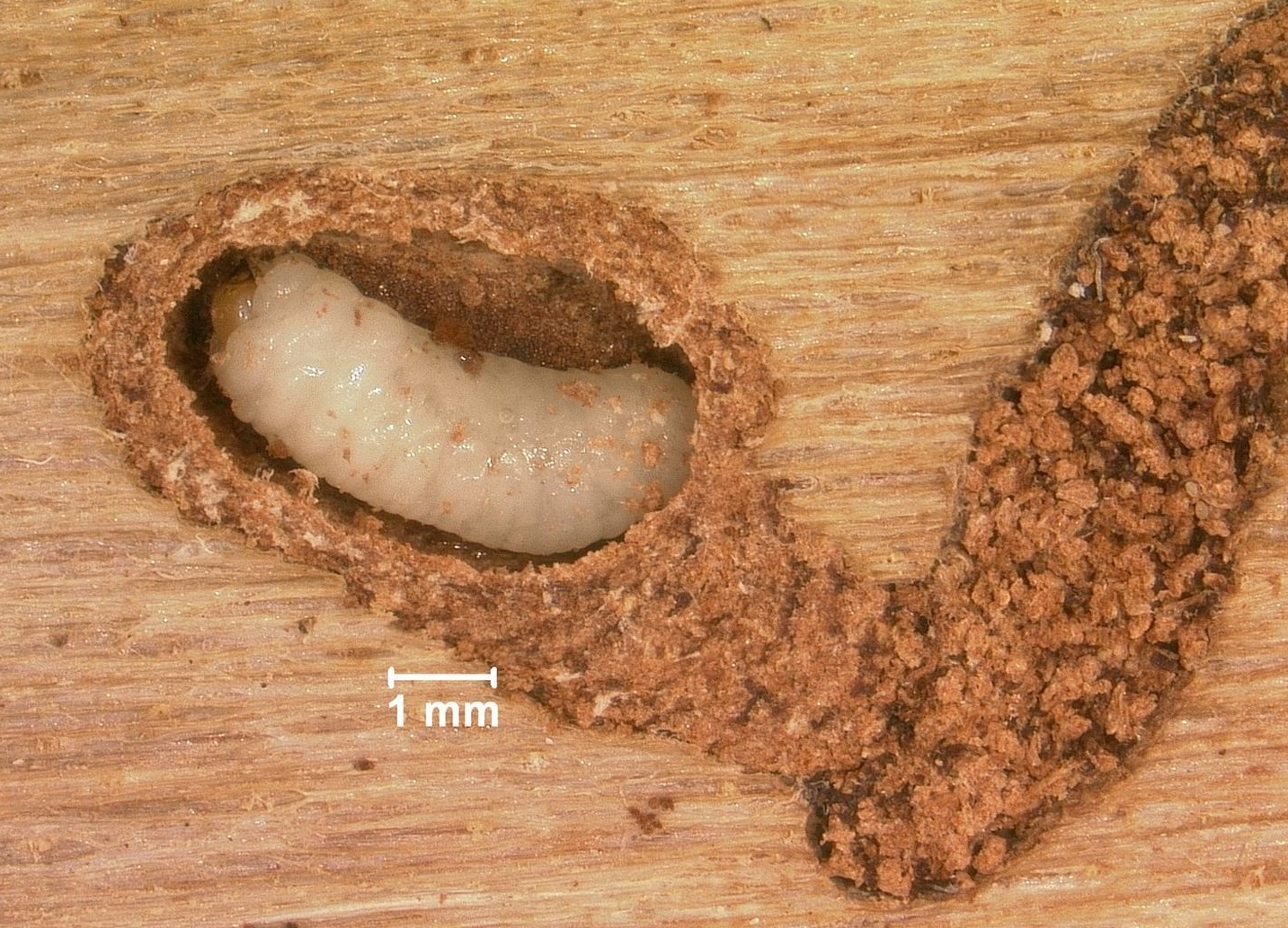
Ips grandicollis larva

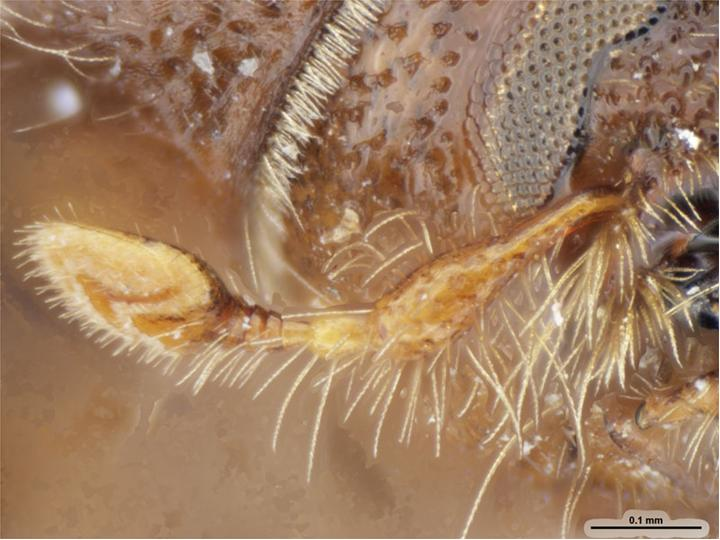
Flat antenna club of Ips confusus

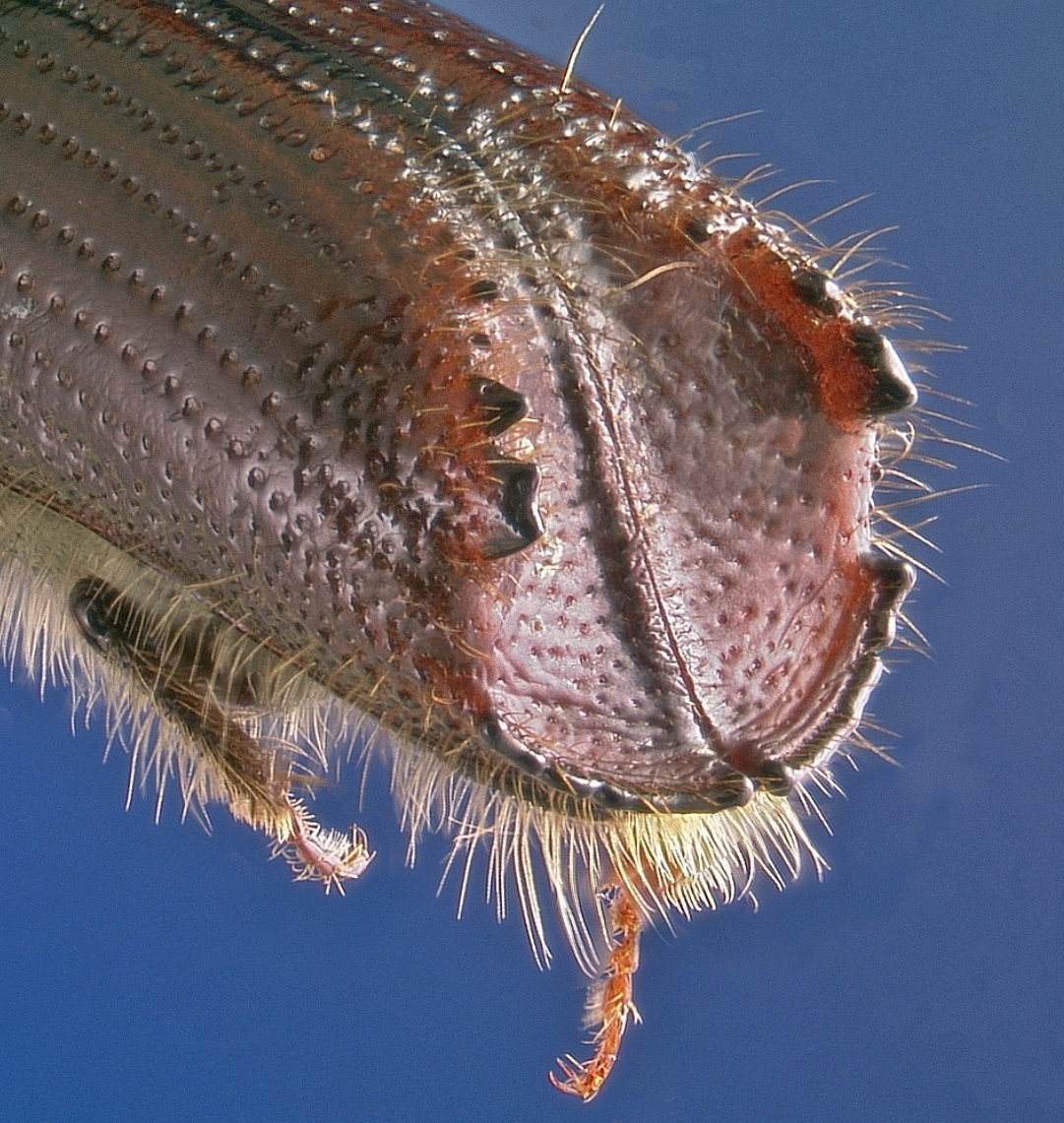
Concave elytra and spines of Ips emarginatus

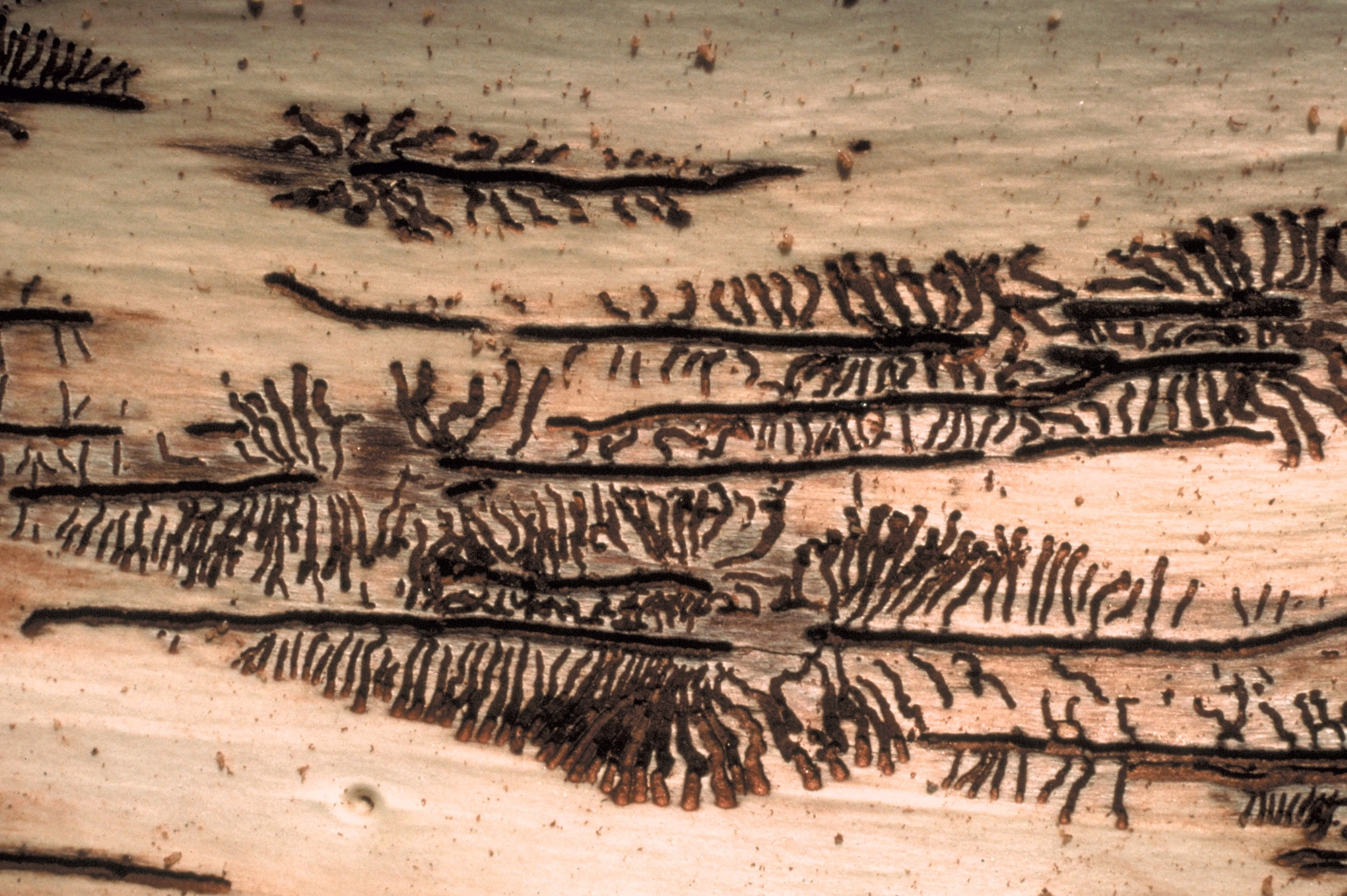
Ips perturbatus galleries

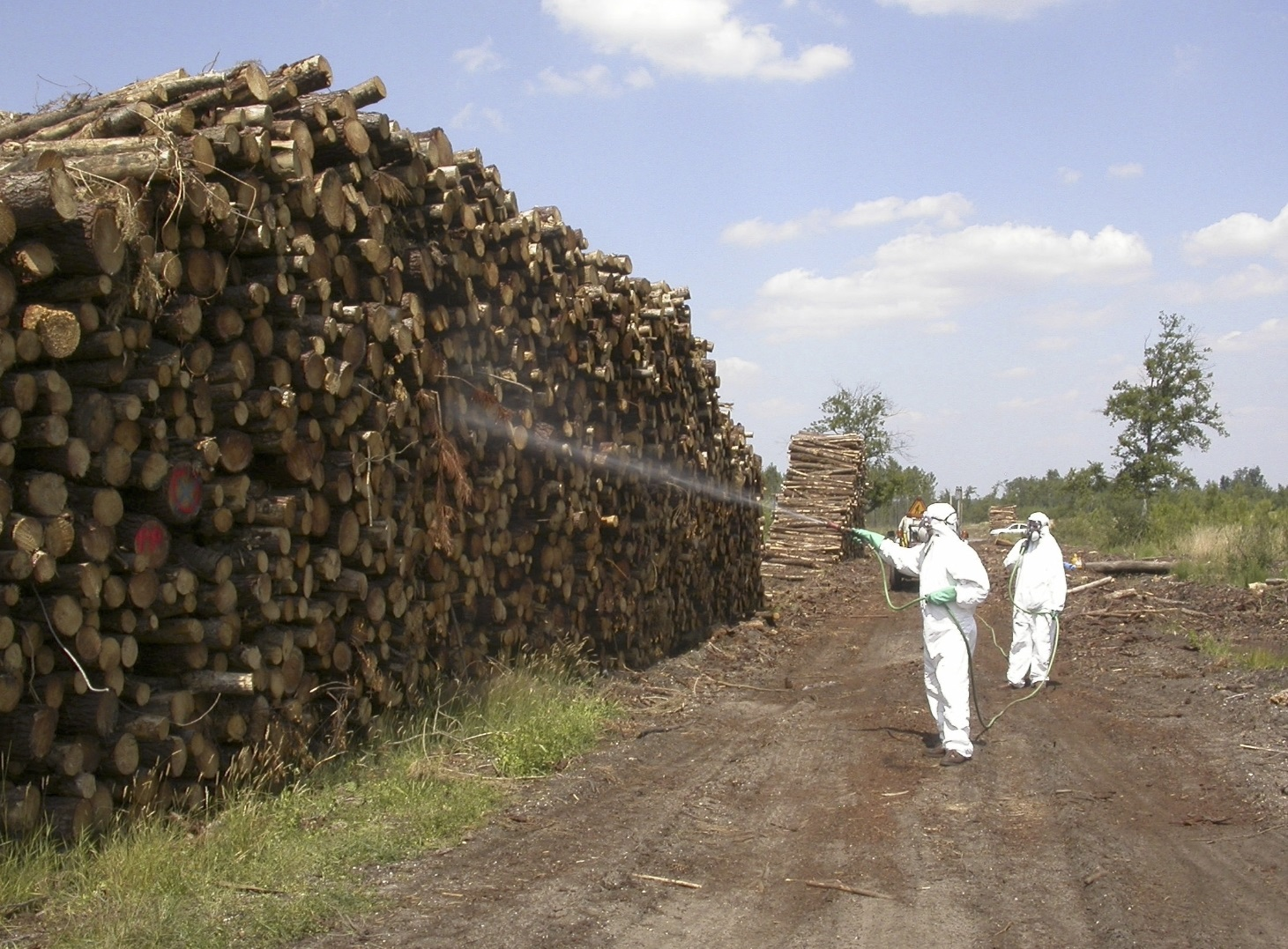
Treating pine logs for Ips sexdentatus

== See also ==
- Forest pathology
- Ambrosia beetle
- Xyleborus glabratus
- Euwallacea fornicatus
- Laurel wilt disease
