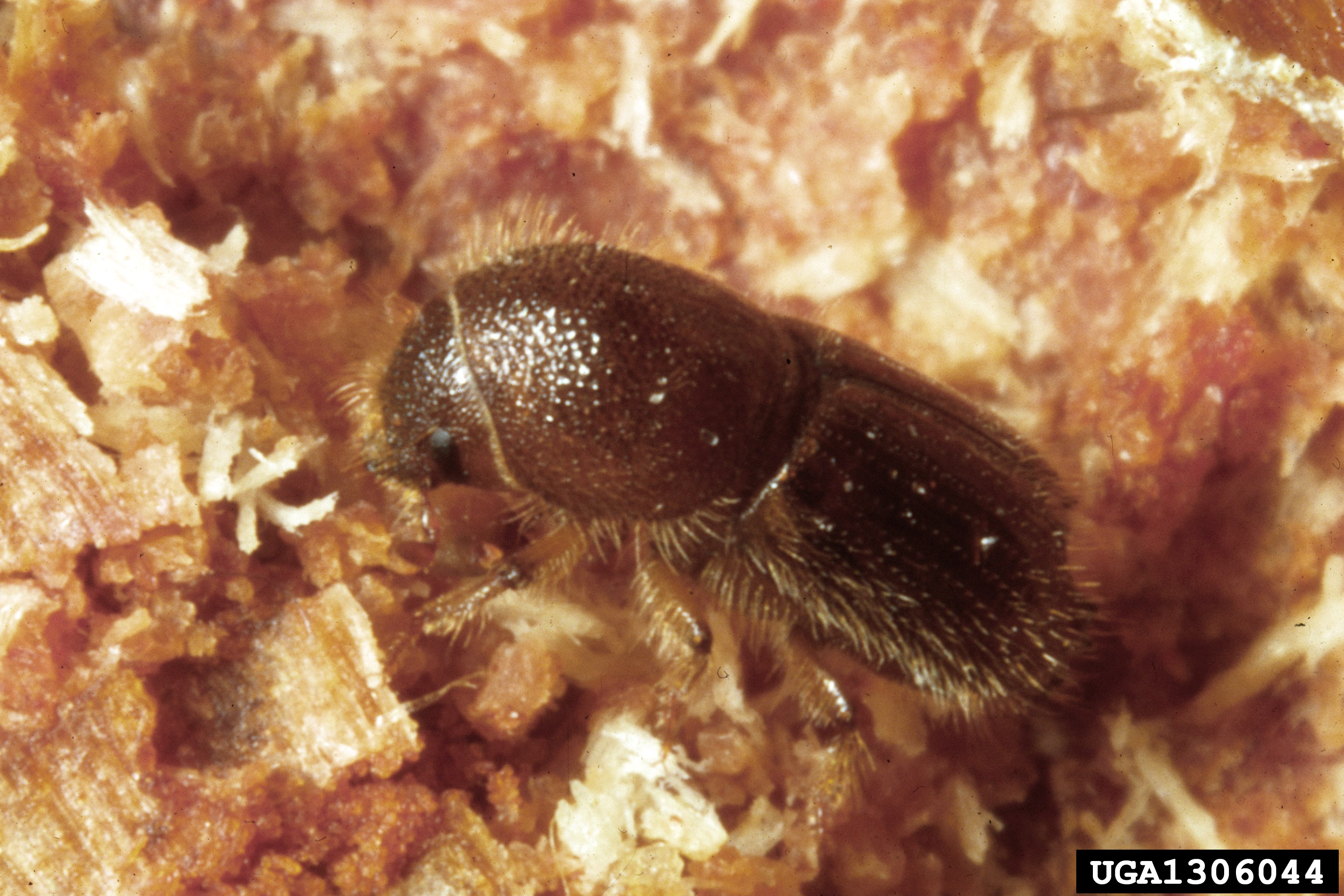

Scientific classification
- Kingdom: Animalia
- Phylum: Arthropoda
- Clade: Pancrustacea
- Class: Insecta
- Order: Coleoptera
- Suborder: Polyphaga
- Infraorder: Cucujiformia
- Superfamily: Curculionoidea
- Family: Curculionidae
- Genus: Ips
- Species: I. pini

Binomial name
- Ips pini (Say)

= Ips pini =

Species of beetle

Ips pini, also known as the pine engraver or North American pine engraver, is a species of typical bark beetle in the family Curculionidae native to North America. Its habitat is broadly distributed throughout the North American continent, extending from Canada and Alaska to northern Mexico, where it is primarily associated with coniferous forests and trees of smaller diameters, typically ranging from 12 to 20 cm.

Ips pini populations are subcategorized by their geographic ranges and are primarily distinguished by how they produce the enantiomeric composition of ipsdienol, the major pheromone produced by males. The species is a vector for blue stain fungus, which colonizes the sapwood and disrupts the host tree's water transport system.

== Morphology ==
Adult Ips pini beetles range from three to five mm in length, though some individual beetles can grow up to six mm. A notable structural feature of these beetles is their elytral declivity, which is distinctively concave and equipped with spines at the terminal end. Additionally, pine engravers have a predominantly dark coloration, displaying varying shades of brown and black.

== Geography ==
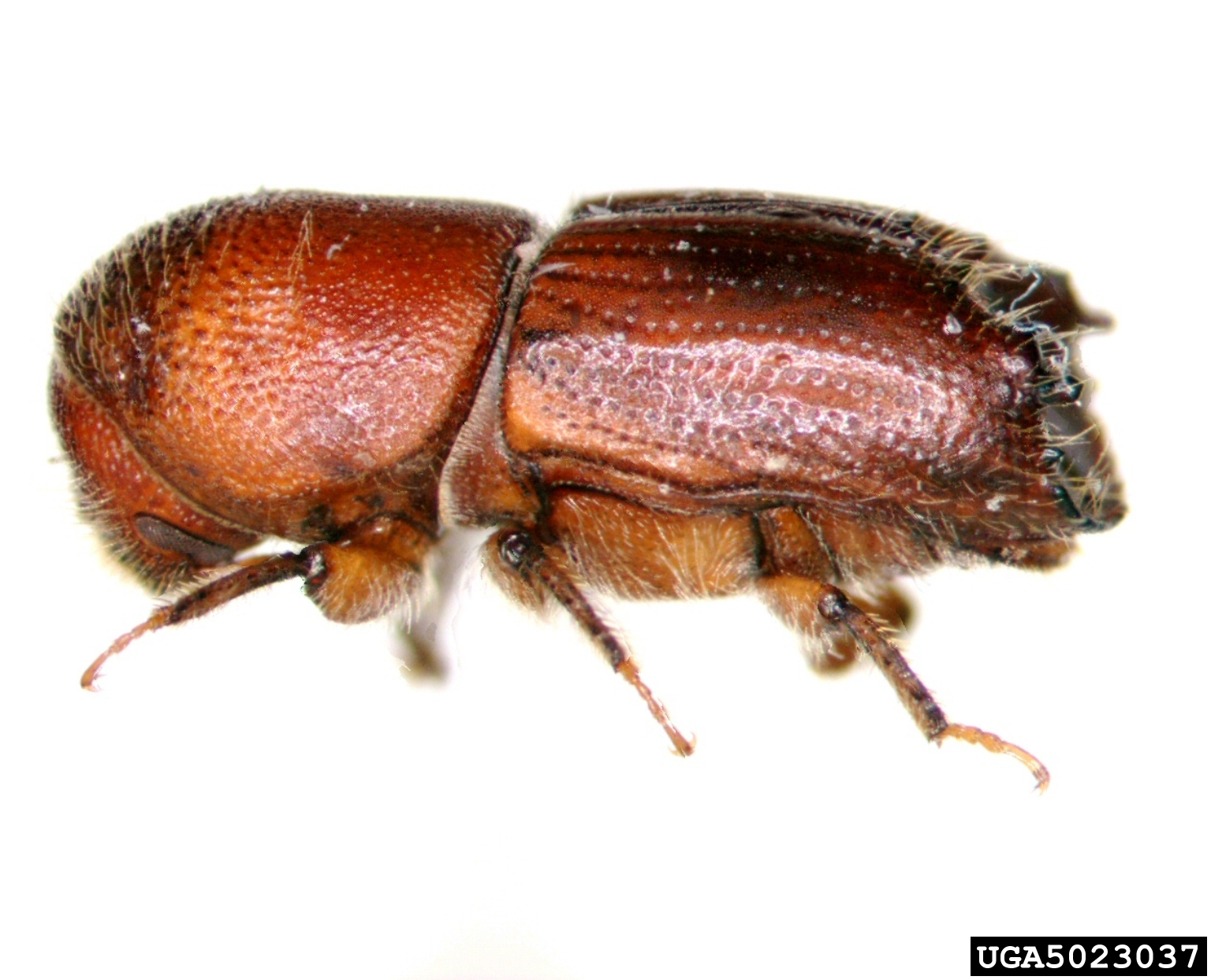
Pine engraver, Ips pini

Ips pini beetles' habitat is broadly distributed across the North American continent, extending from the northern reaches of Canada and Alaska southwards to northern areas of Mexico. The species is predominantly found within the vast expanses of coniferous forests that blanket North America, with a particular association to conifer trees of smaller diameters, ranging from 12 to 20 cm, such as pine or spruce trees.

== Mating ==
Ips pini are polygynous. After mating, the females create ovipositional chambers off of the nuptial chamber and lay eggs within the gallery. These galleries are meticulously carved beneath the bark of trees, often extending slightly into the sapwood. This behavior is intrinsic to their species and contributes to their common name, reflecting their unique nesting habits.

During the winter months, adult Ips pini beetles typically seek refuge in the needle litter found on the forest floor or beneath the bark of trees that have been infested. This behavior is part of their survival strategy during the colder periods of the year. With the onset of spring and warmer temperatures, the male beetles emerge from their winter locations and actively begin tunneling into trees that are exhibiting signs of weakness or stress. This activity marks the commencement of the mating season. Males' release of pheromones serve to attract females, drawing them towards the males' newly established territories within the trees.

Many females begin the mating season with a reserve of sperm stored within their spermatheca, a specialized storage organ, which is considered an unusual trait of Ips pini reproductive behavior. This stored sperm is the result of previous mating sessions. Males, aware of this, engage in repeated copulation with the females, seeking to displace sperm from previous mating sessions and thereby increasing the likelihood that the current male will sire the offspring. This process of repeated mating typically spans a duration of five to seven days, during which males aim to secure almost complete paternity of the ensuing offspring.

=== Parental care ===
The establishment of enduring pair bonds in pine engraver beetles is often associated with both male parental care and the assurance of paternity. Throughout the prolonged opposition period, males form lasting associations with females, engaging in the removal of frass as the females lay their eggs within the host tree's tissue.

A 1997 study led by Frances M. Lissemore, published in the journal Behavioral Ecology, tested two hypotheses regarding the benefits of this behavior for male Ips pini beetles: the first supposition suggested that frass removal contributes to increased offspring production through a form of care ("Paternal Care Hypothesis"); the alternative supposition posited it plays a role in paternity assurance by actively preventing other males from mating with females ("Paternity Assurance Hypothesis").

Lissemore's field experiments involving the removal of males showed no evidence of their impact on offspring production across several measured parameters. In laboratory trials where virgin females were reciprocally mated with sterile and fertile males, a gradual increase in last-male paternity was observed over time. Additionally, field observations revealed that female pine engravers often retain sperm from prior matings when seeking entry into a male's breeding gallery. This observed pattern, coupled with the female's ability to store sperm, was said to suggest that males must sustain prolonged access to mating opportunities with females to ensure higher paternity success. The study also assessed a size correlation of large males tending to leave their mates and brood much quicker than their smaller counterparts, despite the fact that the duration of paternal care and male reproductive success were positively correlated.

== Life cycle ==
=== Life cycle stage identification ===
The eggs laid by adult female Ips pini are oblong, are approximately 1.0 mm in length and 0.5 mm in width, and have a distinctive white, pearl-like color. The larvae tend to curl up in C-shaped forms and are most clearly identified by their red-colored heads in contrast to their white bodies. As these larvae progress in their developmental stages, they grow approximately 3/16 inch (4.8 mm), demonstrating significant size increases across their larval stage. As the larvae mature into the pupal stage, they become a waxy-white color, which signifies a key phase in their transition towards adulthood. The pupae maintain a size that is comparatively similar to the adult beetles, indicating the nearing completion of their metamorphosis.

The life cycle stages begin with an egg, progressing to the larva, transforming into the pupa, and culminating in the adult beetle, with the life span typically lasting eight weeks. Prevailing environmental and climatic conditions influence the ability of Ips pini beetles to complete multiple generations within a year. Depending on the favorability of these conditions, these beetles typically go through two cycles annually, but may achieve as many as four reproductive cycles . Adult Ips pini beetles commence their active phase within the early stages of tree life, a phase characterized by the emergence of infestations in trees, which may be recently damaged or sustained damage during the winter months. Such infestations serve as a visible indicator of the beetles' activity and their impact on forest ecosystems.

Male Ips pini beetles' colonization process is a critical step in their life cycle. Males selectively identify host trees deemed suitable for reproduction and proceed to bore into these trees. Their begin by constructing a nuptial chamber beneath the bark, designed to house the eggs. Males then engage in the production of aggregation pheromones, with ipsdienol being a primary component, to attract females to the site. Once fertilization occurs and eggs are laid, the brood's development transitions from larvae to adults within 40 to 55 days. During this period, the developing larvae feed on the inner bark of the host tree, creating intricate patterns that are not merely by-products of their feeding but can also lead to the tree's death. This pattern of feeding and development underscores the intricate relationship between Ips pini beetles and their host trees, highlighting the impact these beetles can have on forest health and the ecological balance within their habitats.

== Plasticity ==
Ips pini beetles are characterized by an exceptionally high degree of adaptability, evident in the phenotypic plasticity observed in their life history traits, which vary significantly according to geographical latitude and elevation. Such variations manifest in their capability for cold weather tolerance and in the number of generations, (voltinism), they can produce within a given time frame. Ips pini beetles are known for their production of ipsdienol, a pheromone critical to their communication and mating behaviors. The nstereochemistry of ipsdienol production within the beetles exhibits variation among local and regional populations, suggesting a nuanced adaptation to their specific environmental contexts. For instance, populations in the Midwestern and Eastern United States regions have been found to produce another compound, lanierone. While lanierone may not inherently possess attractive properties on its own, its presence significantly enhances the attractiveness of ipsdienol.

== Semiochemicals ==
The Ips pini beetle has developed a complex system of communication that relies on the use of various semiochemicals, with the primary means of communication being ipsdienol, which acts as an aggregation pheromone . This particular chemical plays a crucial role in the beetles' life cycle, enabling them to orchestrate coordinated attacks on host trees and to attract females for mating. Ipsdienol's importance in the ecological and reproductive strategies of these beetles is instrumental in ensuring their survival and proliferation. Research indicates the existence of certain compounds, such as nonanal and verbenone, which possess the potential to disrupt these beetles' aggregation behaviors. The compounds reveal the sophisticated and nuanced nature of Ips pini beetles' communication systems, which can influence their behavior and ecological interactions in significant ways. The beetles' chemical strategies exhibit geographic specificity, with variations in the chemical composition of ipsdienol observed across three major geographic regions within North America. Specifically, the Eastern populations of Ips pini are known to produce and respond predominantly to the (+) enantiomer of ipsdienol. In contrast, the Western populations show a preference for synthesizing and responding to the (-) enantiomer of this pheromone. Populations in the broadly defined region of the northern Rocky Mountains exhibit responses to a mix of both (+) and (-) enantiomers, demonstrating an adaptability and specificity in their chemical communication strategies.

Electrophysiological studies provide further insights into the complexity of these communication systems. This research reveals that Ips pini beetles from both the Eastern and Western populations possess receptor features capable of distinguishing between the two enantiomeric forms of ipsdienol. These findings suggest that, despite the lack of differences in the receptor fields of these populations, the specificity of the central nervous system plays a critical role in mediating the behavioral effects elicited by different isomer mixtures of the pheromone. This level of specificity underscores the intricate relationship between chemical communication and behavioral ecology in Ips pini beetles, proposing a highly evolved adaptation to their respective environmental niches.

== Pheromone synthesis and regulation ==
Additional research has provided significant insights into the pheromone synthesis and regulatory mechanisms in Ips pini, highlighting the pivotal role of juvenile hormone III (JH III) in this process. Studies utilizing radiotracer techniques indicate that JH III can directly induce the de novo synthesis of pheromones, specifically ipsdienol, by modulating the incorporation of radiolabeled acetate into this aggregation pheromone. These findings reveal that JH III's regulation of pheromone production operates at critical steps between acetyl-CoA and mevalonate in the biosynthesis pathway. Further investigations have demonstrated that JH III significantly upregulates the mRNA transcript and enzyme activity of HMG-CoA reductase (HMG-R), a key enzyme in the mevalonate pathway, leading to a marked increase in pheromone production. This corpus of research not only elucidates the complex hormonal regulation underlying pheromone production in the Ips pini species, but also supposes potential applications in pest management strategies through the manipulation of pheromone biosynthesis pathways.

== Ecology and behavior ==
Initial signs that Ips pini beetles are residing within trees are most commonly observed through the discoloration of the foliage, where needles on the infested trees begin to turn yellow or brown. The beetles have a predisposition to avoid healthy trees as targets for infestation, as such trees do not meet the beetles' requirements for optimal breeding and living conditions. Rather, Ips pini beetles are more likely to target trees in a weakened, stressed, or declining state, including those that are nearing death. However, in situations where there is a significant surge in the beetle population, the Ips pini species may occasionally infest healthy trees due to the increased competition for breeding sites. Trees that are particularly vulnerable to beetle attacks are those that have been compromised by various stress factors, such as drought, construction activities, overcrowding, the shock of transplantation, flooding, disease, or infestations by other insects.

Further indicators of an Ips pini beetle infestation include the observation of fading tree tops in larger trees or the entire crowns of smaller trees. While pitch tubes on the trunk are a common sign, the presence of boring dust accumulated in the bark's crevices and at the base of the tree is also a telltale symptom. Additionally, the infestation is often marked by numerous small, round emergence holes, approximately 1/8 inch (3.2 mm) in diameter, on the tree trunks. Upon removing the bark near these emergence holes, a complex network of tunnels is usually visible in the wood beneath. The wood surrounding these tunnels often takes on a blue-grey hue, a result of the colonization by specific fungi, typically species belonging to Ceratocystis.

The behavior and impact of Ips pini beetles on trees are also influenced by climate conditions. For example, years characterized by extremely low spring soil moisture levels can lead to an increased likelihood of overwintering beetles attacking and killing living trees, which may otherwise appear healthy. This phenomenon highlights the complex interaction between environmental conditions and beetle behavior, underscoring the potential for climate change to exacerbate the impact of Ips pini beetle infestations.
