= Erigeron sivinskii =

Scientific classification
- Kingdom: Plantae
- Clade: Tracheophytes
- Clade: Angiosperms
- Clade: Eudicots
- Clade: Asterids
- Order: Asterales
- Family: Asteraceae
- Genus: Erigeron
- Species: E. sivinskii

Binomial name
- Erigeron sivinskii G.L.Nesom

Species of flowering plant

Erigeron sivinskii is a North American species of flowering plant in the family Asteraceae known by the common name Sivinski's fleabane.. It has been found in the southwestern United States, in the states of Arizona and New Mexico.

The species is named for botanist and forester Robert C. Sivinski.

Erigeron sivinskii grows on red clay and shale slopes in desert scrub and open pinyon-juniper woodland. It is a small perennial herb rarely more than 8 cm (3.2 inches) tall. The inflorescence generally contains only one flower heads per stem. Each head contains 21–33 ray florets each ray white with a lilac stripe down the middle. These surround many yellow disc florets.
