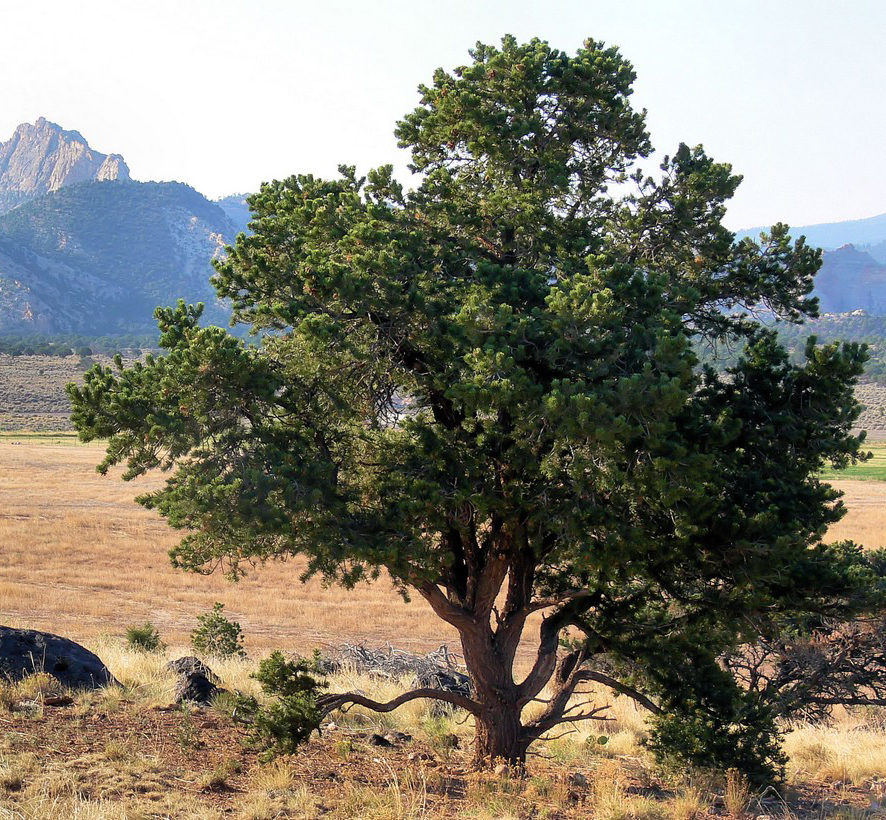
- Near Torrey, Utah

Conservation status
- Least Concern (IUCN 3.1)

- Secure (NatureServe)

Scientific classification
- Kingdom: Plantae
- Clade: Tracheophytes
- Clade: Gymnospermae
- Division: Pinophyta
- Class: Pinopsida
- Order: Pinales
- Family: Pinaceae
- Genus: Pinus
- Subgenus: P. subg. Strobus
- Section: P. sect. Parrya
- Subsection: P. subsect. Cembroides
- Species: P. edulis

Binomial name
- Pinus edulis Engelm.
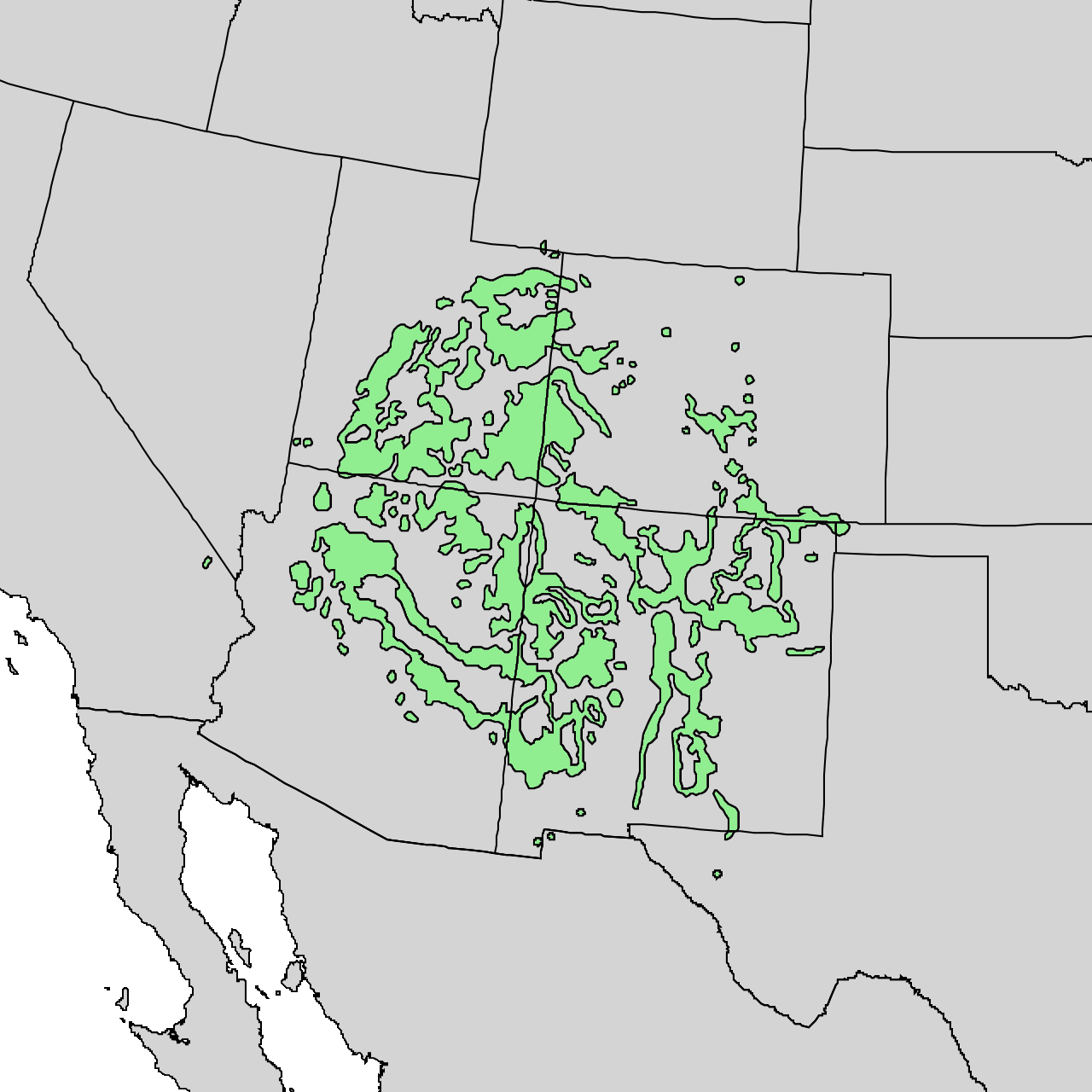
- Natural range of Pinus edulis

Synonyms
- List: Caryopitys edulis (Engelm.) Small; Pinus cembroides subsp. edulis (Engelm.) A.E.Murray; Pinus cembroides var. edulis (Engelm.) Voss; Pinus monophylla var. edulis (Engelm.) M.E.Jones

= Pinus edulis =

North American pine tree species

Pinus edulis, the pinyon pine, Colorado pinyon, or simply pinyon (US: /ˈpɪnjən/ PIN-yuhn, UK: /piːˈnjɒn/ pee-NYON, or /pinˈjɑn/ peen-YAHN), is a species of pinyon pine from the southwestern United States noted for its large, edible seeds. Although all of the species in its section of the pine genus are called pinyon pines this is the species most associated with the name.

== Description ==
The pinyon pine is a shrub to moderate sized tree growing to as much as 21 meters (69 ft) in height, but is more typically 5 to 15 meters (16–49 ft) tall. When young the crown of the tree is fairly pyramid shaped, but becomes more rounded with age. Young trees also have branches nearly at ground level and only losing them once the tree is quite mature. With increasing age the crown can become more open and irregular with a gnarled appearance. The crown is usually nearly as broad as the tree's height.

A pinyon pine with a trunk diameter of 1.72 meters (5 ft 8 in) has been documented, though a thickness of 60 cm (2 ft) at breast height is more typical of fully mature trees. The bark is sepia-brown thin, and scaly when new, eventually becoming unevenly furrowed and gray. The twigs are lite red-brown to tan that fade to gray and are usually rough with small warty nodules, but can occasionally be smooth.

The needle-like leaves are usually two to a bundle, but might also be three to a bundle or solo, but the sheath at the base of the bundle is lost early. They curve upwards and are 2–4 centimeters (0.8–1.6 in) long and just 0.9–1.5 millimeters wide. Solitary needles have two groves while those in two-needle bundles have two sides. When three are three needles to a bundle they will have three sides. They are blue-green with pale bands of stoma, especially on the upper surface, and can either have smooth edges or very fine serrations. The classic two leaved Colorado pinyon needle will have a crescent shaped cross section with two or three resin ducts. Each needle lasts four to six years. Pinyon pine buds are red-brown, resinous, ellipsoid to egg-shaped, and 0.5–1 cm long. Buds a formed in the summer and begin developing into new twigs and needles the following spring.

The pollen cones are typically 3–6 mm long; yellowish to red-brown and ellipsoidal. New seed cones in the spring are small, around 6.4 mm (0.25 in) in diameter and resemble a pincushion pale yellow-green to red-purple in color. When receptive the seed cone's scales open to accept pollen blown breezes from other trees. By fall it will have reached about 1.3 cm (0.5 in). In the second year the green seed cone will developing to full maturity, growing through the spring and summer. When mature the seed cones can be 3 to 5 centimeters (1.2–2.0 in), but are typically around 4 cm.

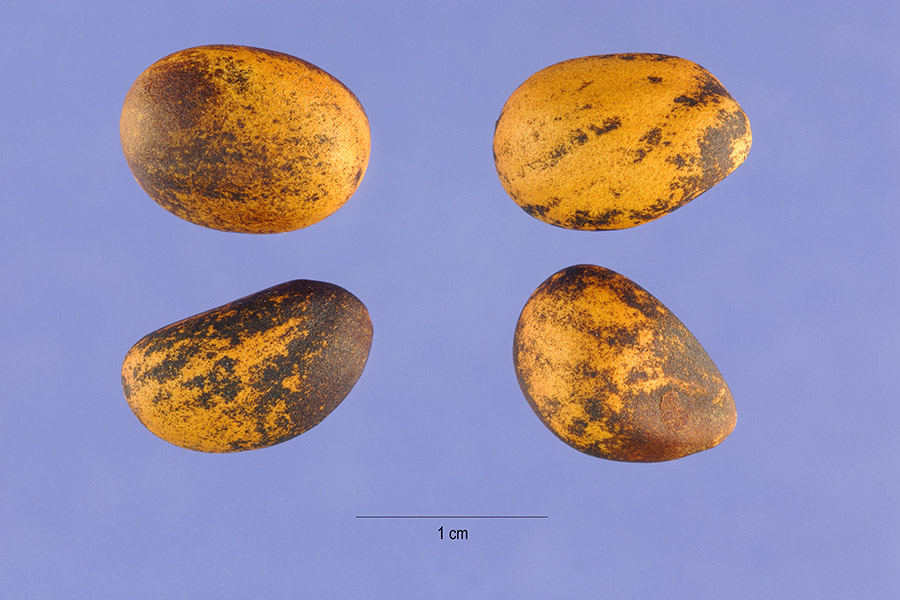
Seeds with 1 cm scale

The seeds are somewhat egg-shaped ellipsoids to fully ellipsoid, and large for a pine, mostly measuring 8–16 millimeters long with thick brown shells. Cones can also contain seeds with light tan shells, but these are almost invariably hollow and sterile. They are wingless and leave quite visible hollows in the cone scales. Pinyons bear cone seeds at a fairly young age, just 25 years old when they are 1.5 to 3 meters (5–10 ft) tall, though they do not produce large quantities of seeds until 75 to 100 years of age. As a long lived tree they can produce large crops for centuries. Areas with stable woodlands, undisturbed by fire, have living trees from 300 to 1,000 years old.

Pinyon pines are very similar to the single-leaf pinyon (Pinus monophylla), but most of the needles on the single-leaf pinyon are solitary and round in cross section, though often with a grove on each side. The solitary needles also give the twigs of the single-leaf pinyon a more spiky look; its crushed needles are described as smelling 'pungent' while those of the pinyon pine are 'fragrant'. However, there is a population of trees in central Arizona south of the Mogollon Rim that will often grow single needles in dry years and two needles in wet years, that may or may not be part of the species. This pattern is repeated in at least one population of trees in Nevada.

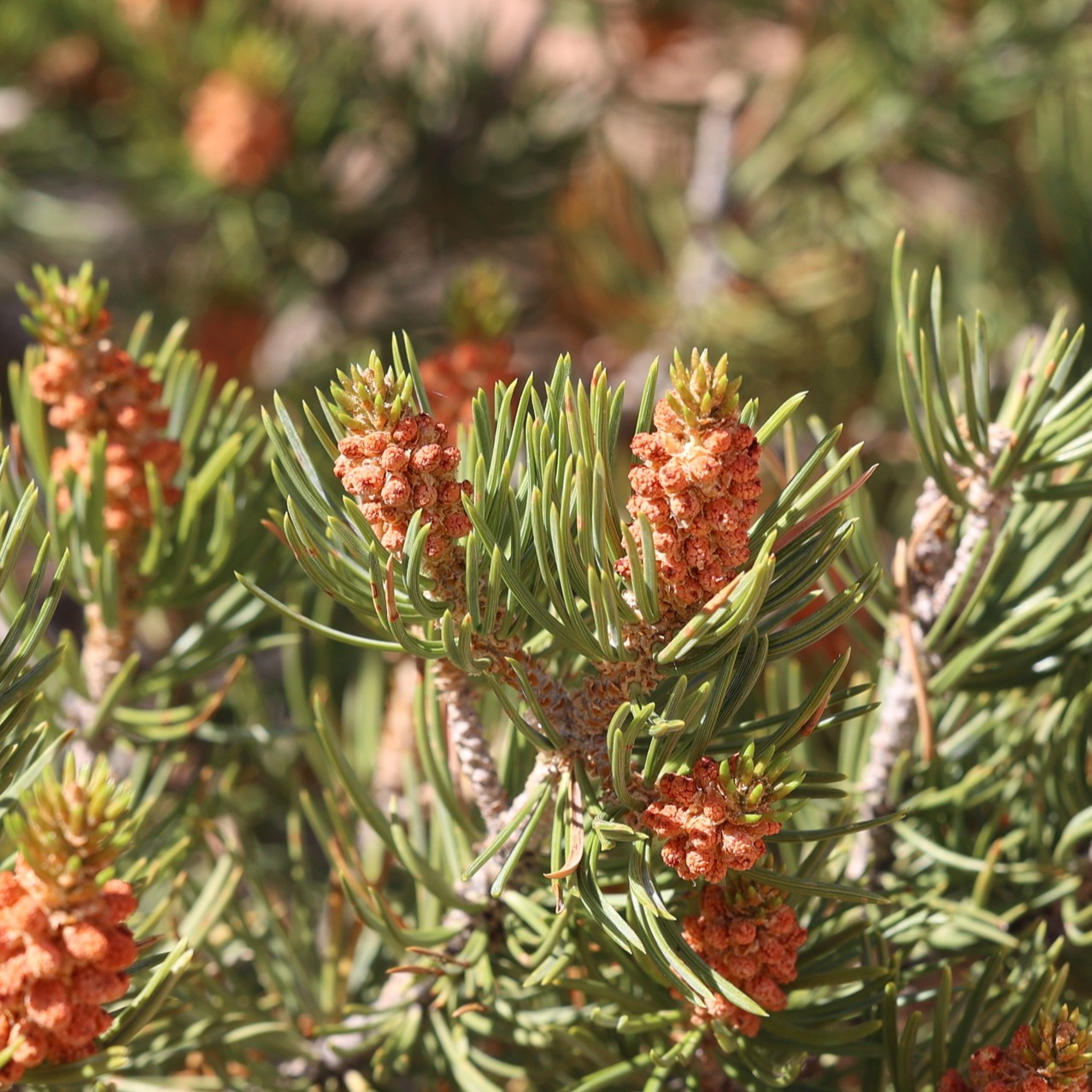
Pollen cones

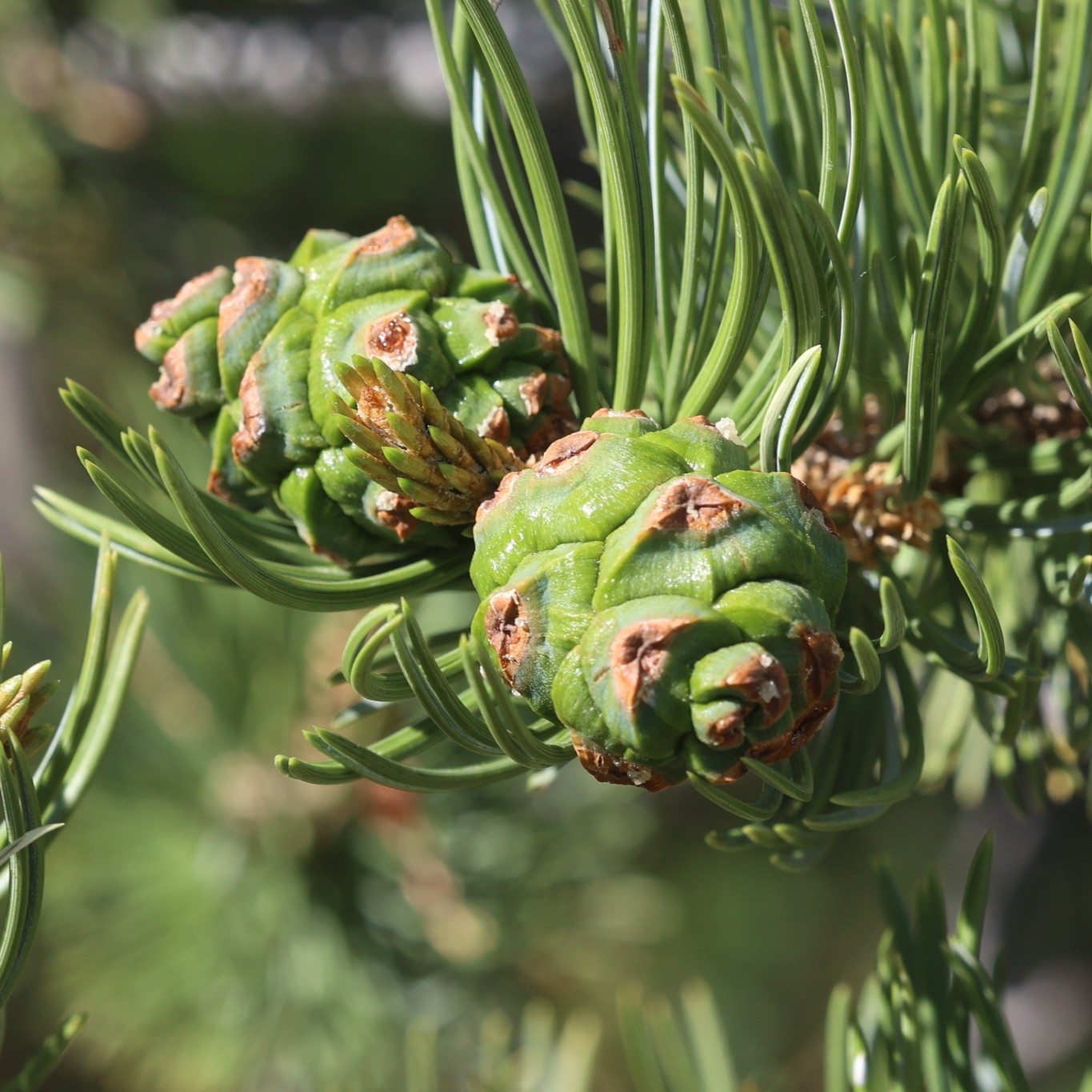
Green seed cones

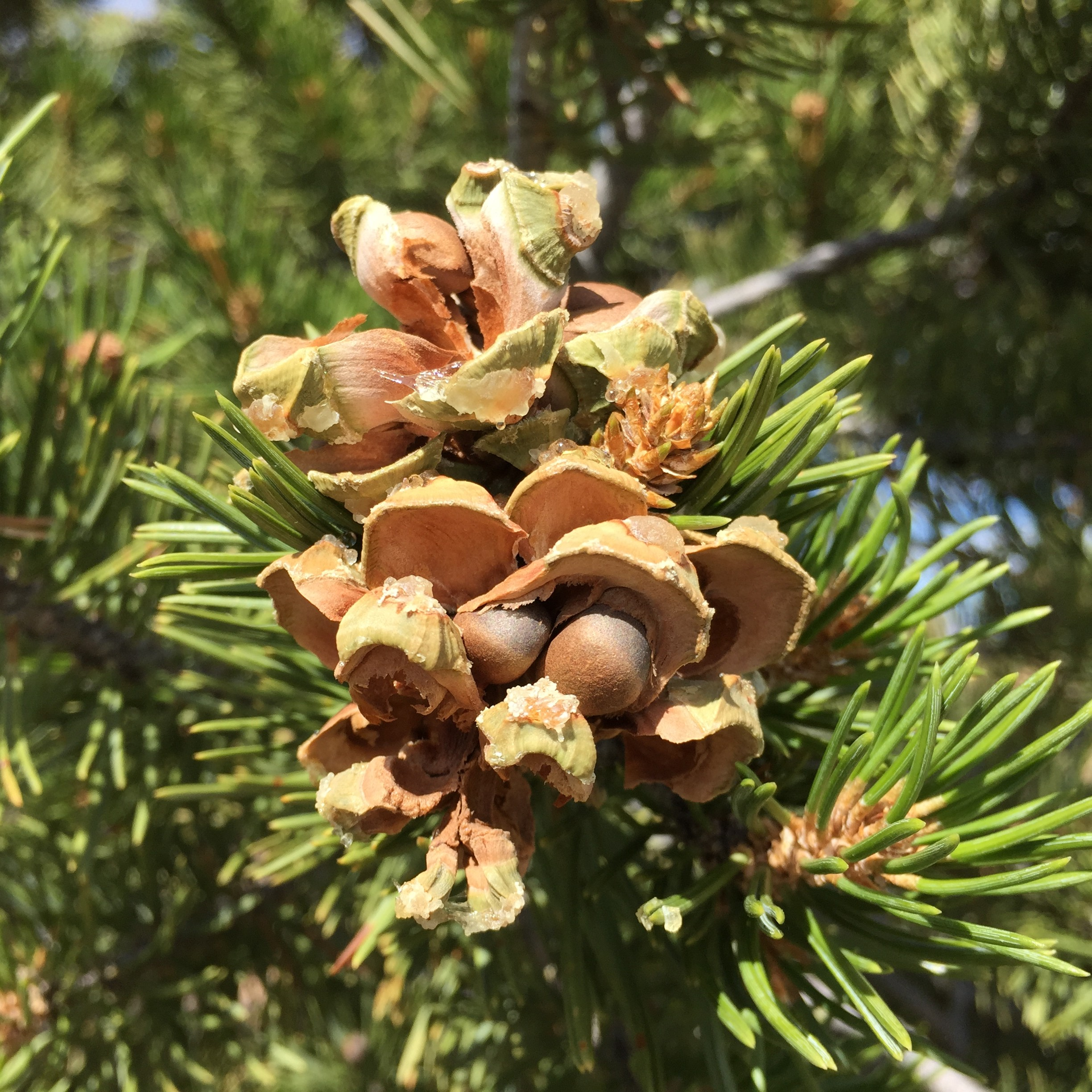
Mature cones with seeds

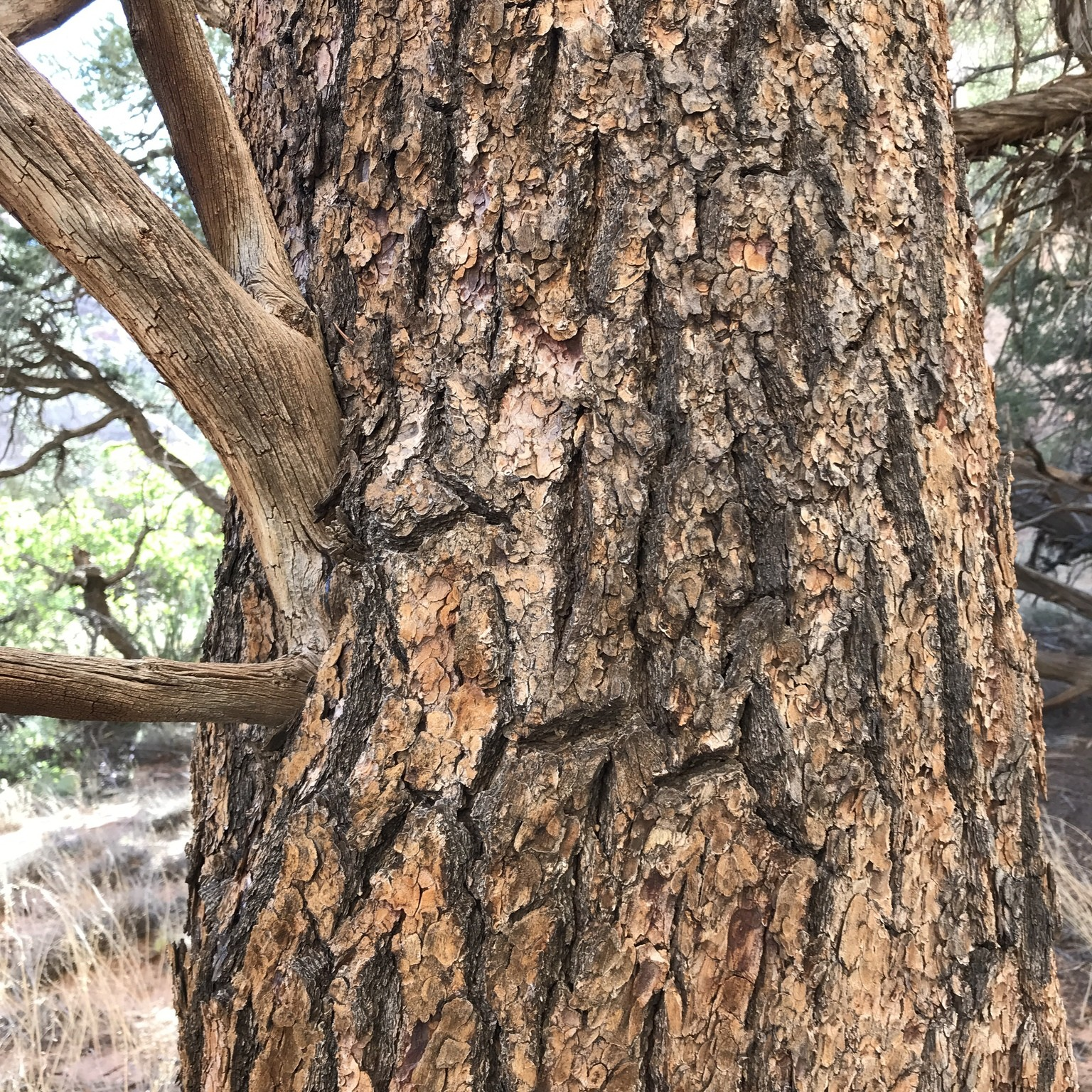
Trunk

=== Phytochemistry ===
The oleoresin, the gummy crude turpentine produced by wounds, from the pinyon pine is largely α-pinene, δ-3-carene, and ethyl octanoate. The large amounts of ethyl octanoate, more than 20 times as much compared with single-leaf pinyon pines, is responsible for the characteristic pleasant odor of the trees. The essential oils from the trunk of the tree are similar, being largely α-pinene, ethyl octanoate, germacrene D, with some trees also containing significant amounts of longifolene. Needles essential oils are more than half α-pinene, with variable amounts of longifolene and significant amounts of β-pinene, myrcene, 6-3-carene, beta phellandrene, ethyl octanoate, and bornyl acetate.

== Taxonomy ==
The branches and cones of Pinus edulis as illustrated by Charles Edward Faxon in The Silva of North America

Pinus edulis was scientifically described and named by the botanist George Engelmann in 1848. He described the species from specimens sent to him by Friedrich Adolph Wislizenus from the Sangre de Cristo Range in New Mexico. It is part of subsection Cembroides within the genus Pinus, which is classified in the Pinaceae family. It has been described as a subspecies or variety of Pinus cembroides.

Table of Synonyms
Name	Year	Rank	Notes
Caryopitys edulis (Engelm.) Small	1903	species	
Pinus cembroides subsp. edulis (Engelm.) A.E.Murray	1982	subspecies	
Pinus cembroides var. edulis (Engelm.) Voss	1907	variety	Published 1908
Pinus monophylla var. edulis (Engelm.) M.E.Jones	1891	variety	

Pinus edulis forms natural hybrids with other species, including Pinus cembroides and Pinus monophylla. A named nothospecies called Pinus × kohae Frankis is listed as accepted in Plants of the World Online, but is formed with a disputed species named Pinus californiarum. They are a population of single leaved pines largely south of the Mogollon Rim in Arizona and the transition between the two groups have also been interpreted as being a variety named P. edulis var. fallax.

=== Names ===
The species name, edulis means 'edible' in Botanical Latin, a reference to the edible seeds of the tree. The tree and its seeds are known by the common names pinyon, piñon, and piñón, with this being applied most often to Pinus edulis but is also used for other pine species with edible seeds. This is a borrowing from Spanish that began to be used in English to refer this species by 1840s and to other species in the genus by the 1830s.

More specifically it is called the Colorado pinyon pine, two-needle pinyon pine, New Mexican pinyon pine, mesa pinyon pine, and common pinyon pine or with the spelling variant piñon. It is sometimes called the nut pine, although this name is applied to other species from the southwestern US and Mexico.

In the Navajo language the tree is cháʼoł while the seeds are neeshchʼííʼ. In the Hopi language it is called tuve′e.

== Range and habitat ==
The central part of the pinyon pine's native range is in Colorado, New Mexico, Utah, and Arizona forming a primary part of the pinyon–juniper woodlands in these states.

There are additional small area outside this primary range in Oklahoma, Texas, Wyoming, and possibly California and Nevada. In Wyoming it grows in only the most extreme southern portions of the state in Laramie County in the east and Sweetwater County in the west. In Texas it is found only in the Trans-Pecos in the Guadalupe Mountains and the Sierra Diablo range. In Oklahoma it is confined to just Cimarron County at the end of the Oklahoma panhandle.

A small population of trees growing in the New York Mountains of Southern California are considered to be Pinus edulis in sources such as The Jepson Manual, but alternatively they are described by other sources as a population of Pinus monophylla with two needles or as part of separate species called the California pinyon (Pinus californiarum). Similarity, in Nevada it only grows in eastern parts of the state in White Pine County, but this population is not considered to be Colordo pinyons by the Flora of North America.

In total the range of the species is about 14.9 million hectares (37 million acres) with very little of this range outside the four primary states. The pinyon–juniper woodland is the lowest and warmest forest habitat in the Intermountain West and Southern Rocky Mountains. It typically is found at elevations of 1,500 to 2,100 meters (4,900–6,900 ft), but can sometimes be found as high as 2,700 meters (8,900 ft) such as east of Monarch Pass in Colorado. The amount of precipitation in the woodlands is variable from a low of 250 mm (10 in) to a high of 690 mm (27 in) on parts of the Mogollon Rim, though amounts above 560 mm (22 in) are unusual. This water may arrive as summer rains as in eastern New Mexico or mostly as snow during the winter in northern Utah. Though many Americans think of this as a hot and dry environment, compared with western grasslands and deserts it is cooler and moderately moist with at least a little summer rainfall in all parts of its range.

The structure of stands varies widely from open savanahs with grassy areas between the trees to dense forests with a closed canopy. At the edges of its range south of the Mogollon Rim in Arizona it grows on cooler, north facing hillsides and sheltered by cliffs. It forms extensive woodlands with the Utah juniper in the Four Corners region, but can grow at higher elevations where it becomes the dominant tree atop mesas such at at Mesa Verde.

== Ecology ==
The pinyon is a slow growing species that is adapted to relatively dry climates and not an intense competitor for sunlight, like fast growing pines from moist habitats with many other species. The pinyon is enormously dependent on and has co-evolved with the pinyon jay (Gymnorhinus cyanocephalus), a modest sized bird in the crow family with blue-gray plumage and a thin beak. As with most trees, the pinyon does not produce a heavy crop of seeds every year, with large numbers being produced every six years on average. The upright cones with the wide open scales are thought to be an adaptation to allow animals to more easily disperse the seeds.

The new cones can be damaged by late spring frosts, causing the crop to fail the following year across large areas and too lengthy spring rains can prevent their fertilization by the wind-borne pollen.

Along with the single-leaf pinyon, Colorado pinyons are a principle host for the parasitic plant pinyon dwarf mistletoe. Pinyon pines are attacked by the pinyon ips beetle (Ips confusus). Under normal conditions they thin stands of already damaged or stressed trees, but large populations of the beetles can eliminate whole groves of otherwise healthy pinyon pines.

== Uses ==
Pinyon nuts are a traditional food of the Western Apache, Hopi, Tewa, and other native peoples of the southwest.

Traditionally the Hopi people used pitch from the pinyon tree to prepare some dyes, set turquoise into mosaics, and to waterproof and repair pottery. In traditional funerary practices the resin was also put coals after the funeral to produce a strongly scented smoke. Archaeologist Harold S. Gladwin described pit-houses constructed by southwestern Native Americans c. 400–900 CE; these were fortified with posts made from Pinyon trunks and coated with mud.

The pine nuts continue to be gathered in large amounts for the local markets by the Navajo and the Hispanos of New Mexico. The pinyon seeds are typically gathered following the first frost of the year.

In areas where it is common, the resinous pinyon is used as firewood. The pinyon pine is grown as a landscape tree or shrub, particularly in areas where low water usage is a priority. Even moderate watering can result in an unappealing shape. However, the very resinous nature of the tree often causes persons or objects beneath it to be abundantly covered in drops of gum or pitch. It is infrequently used as a cut or live Christmas Tree near its native range and cut trees were sold outside the region, but this use was declining by the 1990s.

== In culture ==
The piñon pine is the state tree of New Mexico. It was officially designated as a state symbol by the legislature on 16 March 1949. In the years before legislative action the New Mexico Federation of Women's Clubs had a series of votes to select a tree to recommend as a state symbol, the piñon won out narrowly over the quaking aspen. Both before and after statehood the piñon nut has been an important part of state culture with roots in Spanish and native food traditions.
