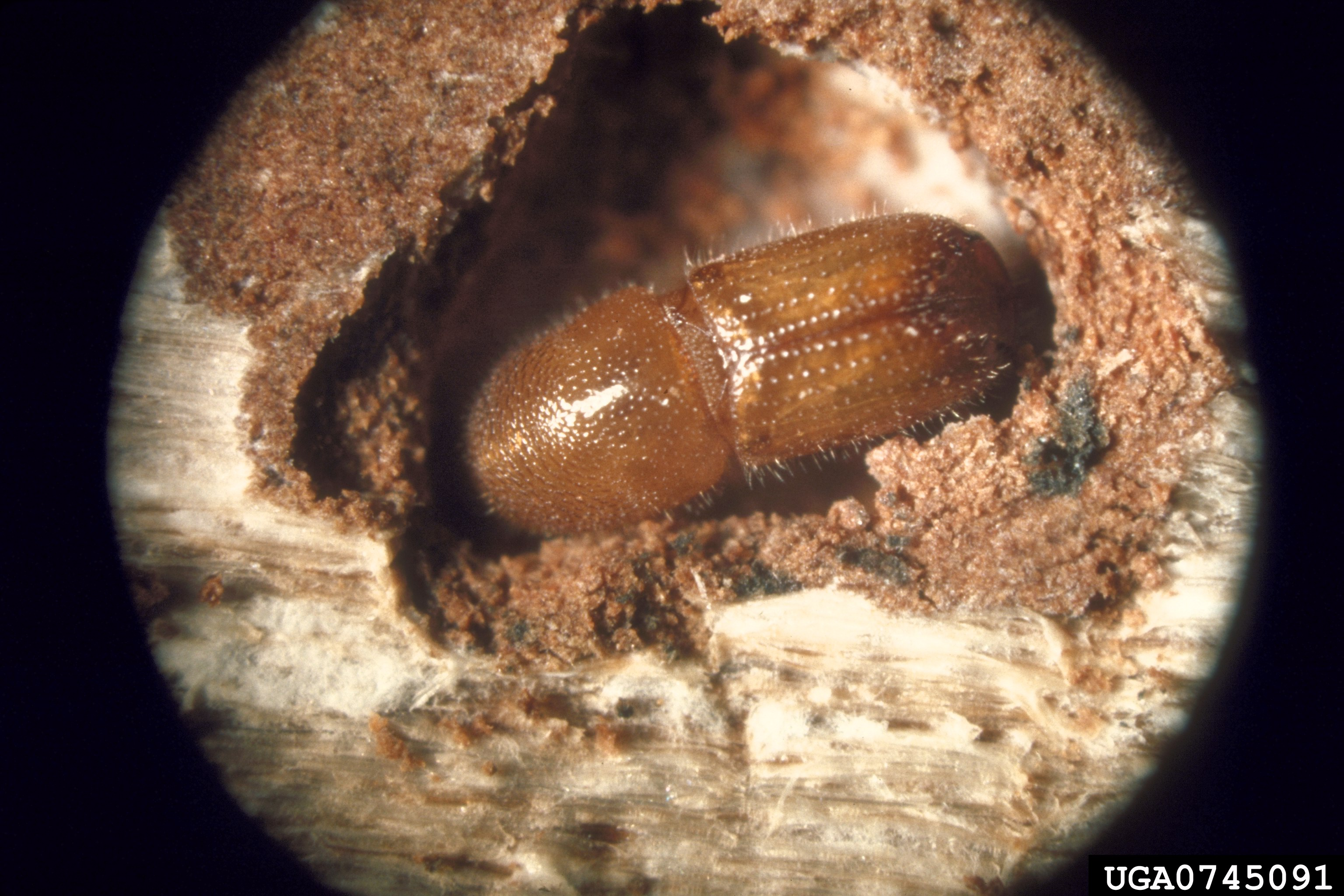

Scientific classification
- Domain: Eukaryota
- Kingdom: Animalia
- Phylum: Arthropoda
- Class: Insecta
- Order: Coleoptera
- Suborder: Polyphaga
- Infraorder: Cucujiformia
- Family: Curculionidae
- Genus: Ips
- Species: I. avulsus

Binomial name
- Ips avulsus (Eichhoff, 1868)

= Ips avulsus =

Species of beetle

Ips avulsus, the small southern pine engraver, is a species of typical bark beetle in the family Curculionidae. The pheromones ipsenol, ipsdienol, and lanieron combined attract the most colonization in the host material in regards to the chemical ecology of the small southern pine engraver, which also effects their reproduction processes.
