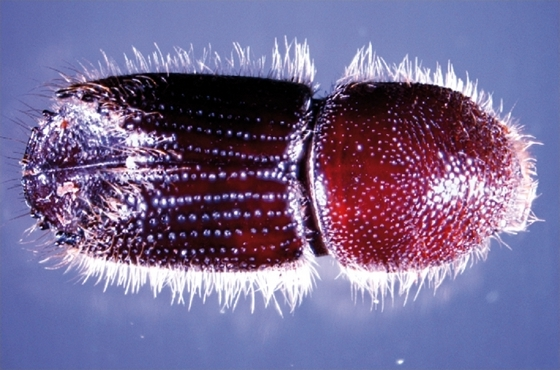
- Ips sexdentatus

Scientific classification
- Kingdom: Animalia
- Phylum: Arthropoda
- Clade: Pancrustacea
- Class: Insecta
- Order: Coleoptera
- Suborder: Polyphaga
- Infraorder: Cucujiformia
- Superfamily: Curculionoidea
- Family: Curculionidae
- Subfamily: Scolytinae
- Tribe: Ipini; Bedel, 1888

Genera
- See text

= Ipini =

Tribe of beetles

Ipini is a tribe of bark beetles. It is a monophyletic group.

Beetles of this tribe specialize on conifers. Many species, such as the six-spined engraver beetle (Ips sexdentatus) and the European spruce bark beetle (Ips typographus), produce galleries in wood for their eggs and larvae.

Almost all beetles in this tribe have polygynous mating systems with harems of females. An exception is the monogamous Ips latidens.

Genera include:

- Acanthotomicus
- Ips
- Orthotomicus
- Pityogenes
- Pityokteines
- Pseudips
