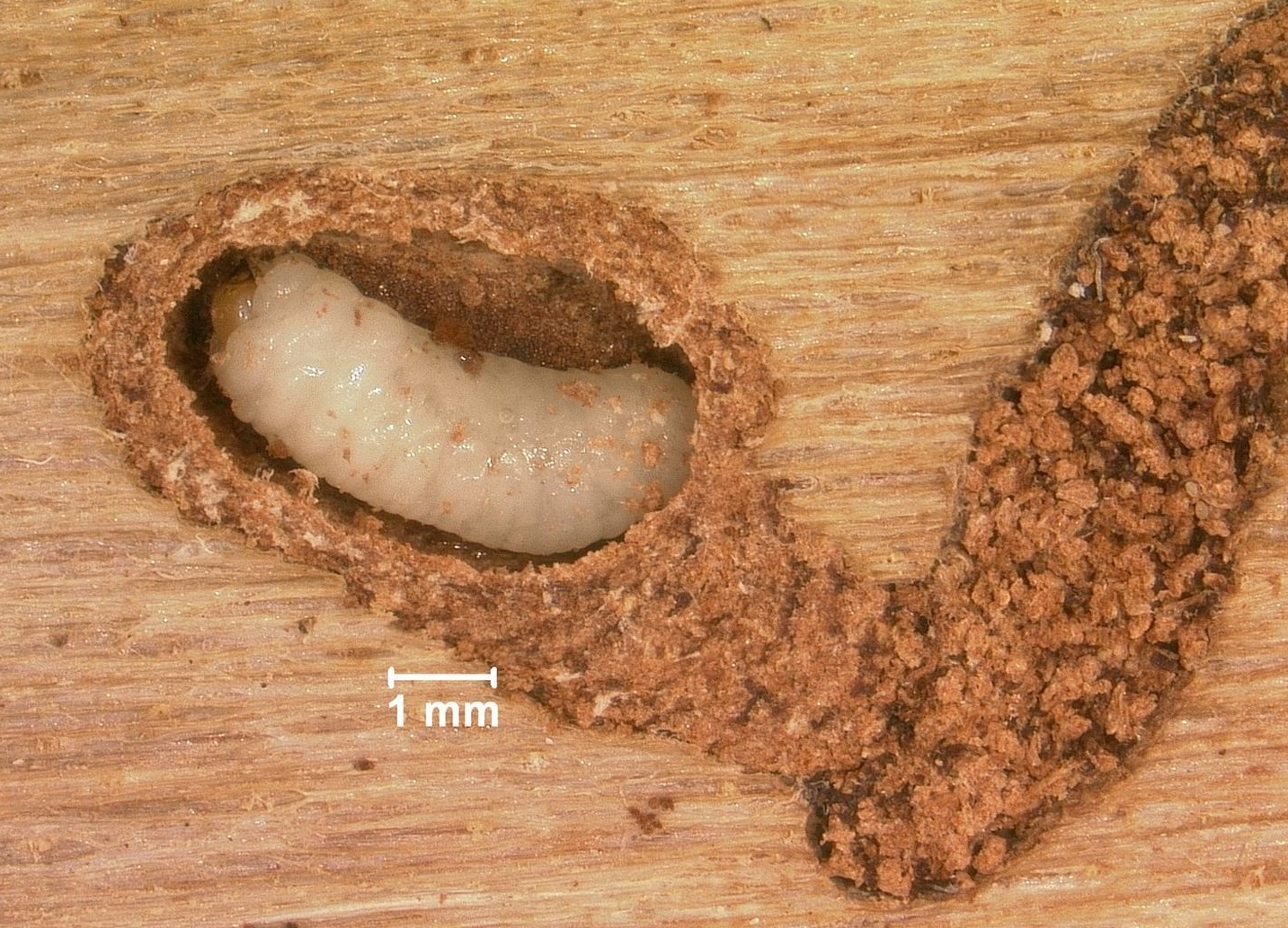

Scientific classification
- Kingdom: Animalia
- Phylum: Arthropoda
- Class: Insecta
- Order: Coleoptera
- Suborder: Polyphaga
- Infraorder: Cucujiformia
- Family: Curculionidae
- Genus: Ips
- Species: I. grandicollis

Binomial name
- Ips grandicollis (Eichhoff)

= Ips grandicollis =

Species of beetle

Ips grandicollis, known generally as eastern five-spined engraver, is a species of typical bark beetle in the family Curculionidae. Other common names include the eastern five-spined ips and southern pine engraver. Ips grandicollis use trap trees of the genus Pinus as food and a habitat.

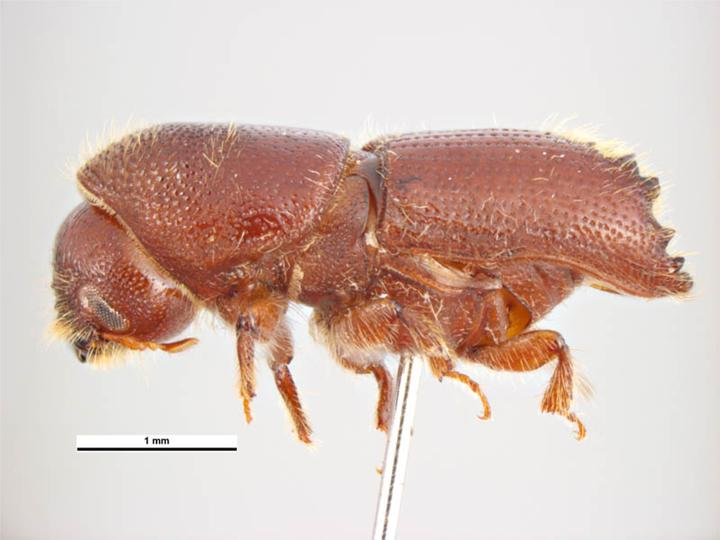
An adult beetle
