= Ips borealis =

Scientific classification
- Kingdom: Animalia
- Phylum: Arthropoda
- Clade: Pancrustacea
- Class: Insecta
- Order: Coleoptera
- Suborder: Polyphaga
- Infraorder: Cucujiformia
- Family: Curculionidae
- Genus: Ips
- Species: I. borealis

Binomial name
- Ips borealis Swaine, 1911

Species of beetle

Ips borealis is a species of typical bark beetle in the family Curculionidae. It is found in North America.

== Subspecies ==
These two subspecies belong to the species Ips borealis:

- Ips borealis borealis
- Ips borealis lanieri Wood
