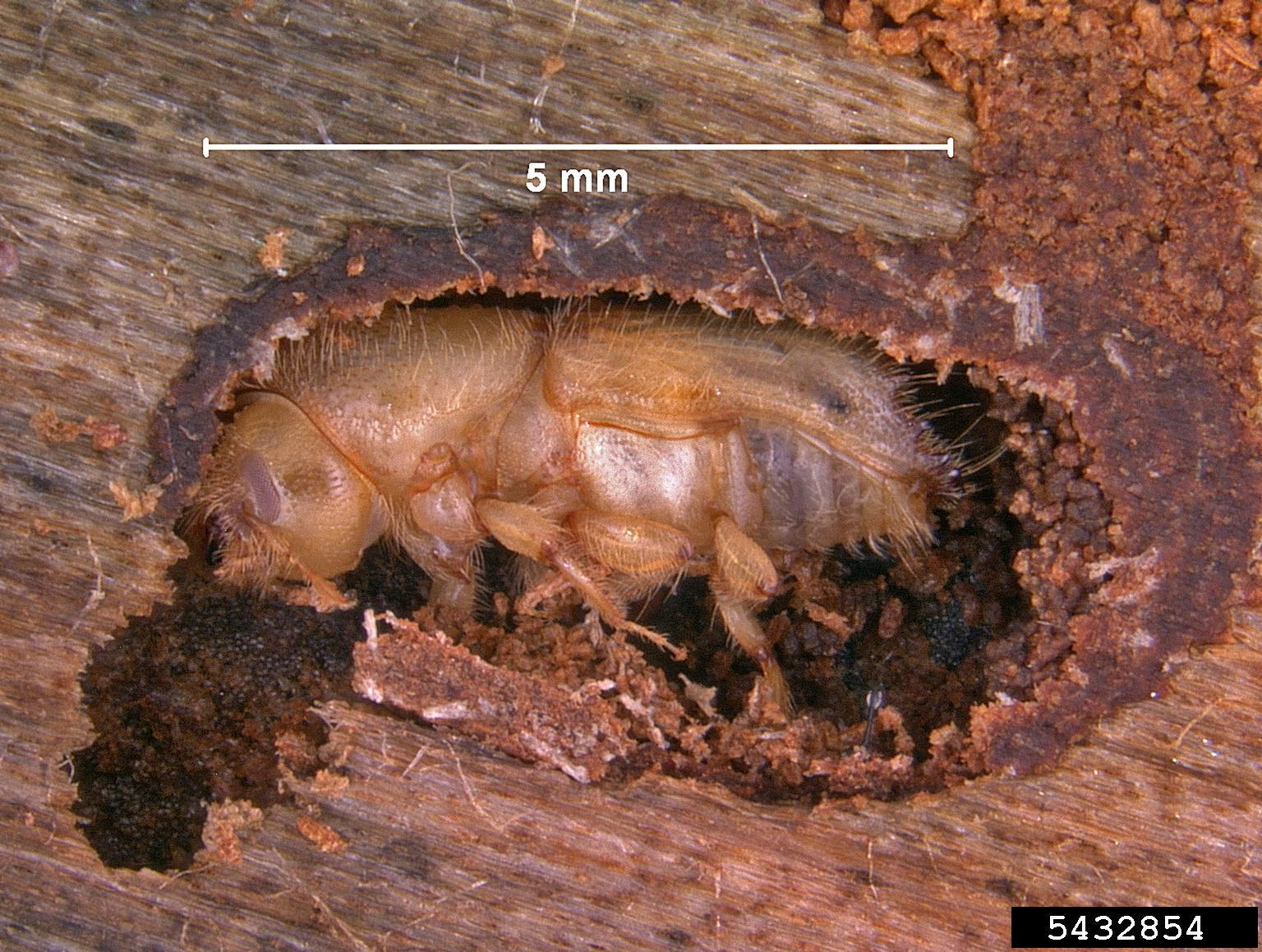

Scientific classification
- Kingdom: Animalia
- Phylum: Arthropoda
- Clade: Pancrustacea
- Class: Insecta
- Order: Coleoptera
- Suborder: Polyphaga
- Infraorder: Cucujiformia
- Superfamily: Curculionoidea
- Family: Curculionidae
- Genus: Ips
- Species: I. calligraphus

Binomial name
- Ips calligraphus (Germar, 1823)

= Ips calligraphus =

Species of beetle

Ips calligraphus, known generally as coarsewriting engraver, is a species of typical bark beetle in the family Curculionidae. Other common names include the six-spined engraver beetle and six-spined ips. It is found in North America.
