= Ips pilifrons =

Scientific classification
- Kingdom: Animalia
- Phylum: Arthropoda
- Clade: Pancrustacea
- Class: Insecta
- Order: Coleoptera
- Suborder: Polyphaga
- Infraorder: Cucujiformia
- Family: Curculionidae
- Genus: Ips
- Species: I. pilifrons

Binomial name
- Ips pilifrons Swaine, 1912

Species of beetle

Ips pilifrons is a species of typical bark beetle in the family Curculionidae. It is found in North America.

== Subspecies ==
These three subspecies belong to the species Ips pilifrons:

- Ips pilifrons pilifrons
- Ips pilifrons sulcifrons
- Ips pilifrons thatcheri Wood
