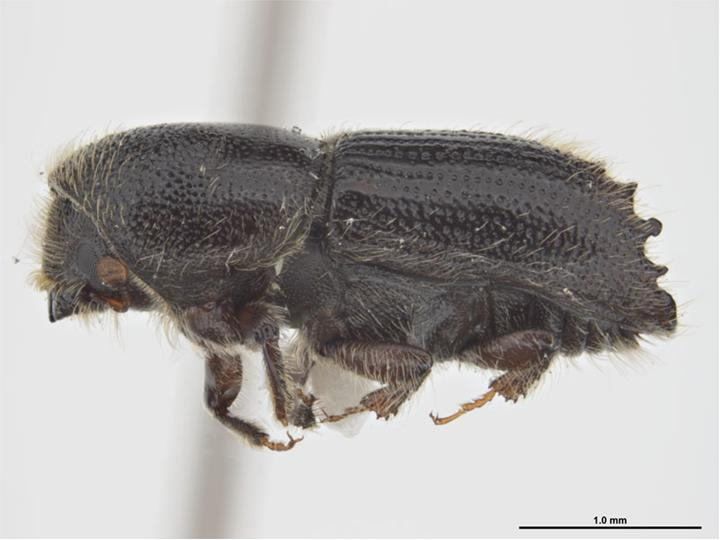

Scientific classification
- Kingdom: Animalia
- Phylum: Arthropoda
- Clade: Pancrustacea
- Class: Insecta
- Order: Coleoptera
- Suborder: Polyphaga
- Infraorder: Cucujiformia
- Superfamily: Curculionoidea
- Family: Curculionidae
- Genus: Ips
- Species: I. subelongatus

Binomial name
- Ips subelongatus Motschulsky, 1860

= Ips subelongatus =

Species of beetle

Ips subelongatus, also known as larch bark beetle or oblong bark beetle, is a species of bark beetle in the family Curculionidae. It is considered near indistinguishable from Ips cembrae except for the species of tree it chooses as a host and through DNA analysis. The species of tree it dwells in are larches Larix sibirica, Larix gmelinii, Larix leptolepis and Larix gmelinii var. olgensis. The beetle is found in the Asian part of Russia, Northeast China (Heilongjiang, Jilin, and Liaoning provinces), Japan (Hokkaido and Honshu), the Korean Peninsula, and Mongolia.
