= Lanierone =

Names
- Preferred IUPAC name 2-Hydroxy-4,4,6-trimethylcyclohexa-2,5-dien-1-one
- Other names: 2-hydroxy-4,4,6-trimethyl-2,5-cyclohexadien-1-one

Identifiers
CAS Number	28750-52-9
3D model (JSmol)	Interactive image; Interactive image
ChemSpider	557684
PubChem CID	642486
UNII	KWW8F22CP4
CompTox Dashboard (EPA)	DTXSID201031959
- InChI: InChI=1S/C9H12O2/c1-6-4-9(2,3)5-7(10)8(6)11/h4-5,10H,1-3H3 Key: GKOBUKITZSFCJC-UHFFFAOYSA-N
- SMILES: CC1=CC(C)(C)C=C(C1=O)O; CC1=CC(C=C(C1=O)O)(C)C

Properties
Chemical formula	C_{9}H_{12}O_{2}
Molar mass	152.193 g·mol^{−1}
Odor	Hay-like

Hazards
- GHS labelling
Hazard statements	H315, H319, H335
- Except where otherwise noted, data are given for materials in their standard state (at 25 °C [77 °F], 100 kPa). Infobox references

Lanierone is a pheromone emitted by the pine engraver and an odorous volatile component of saffron.
