= Ips woodi =

Scientific classification
- Kingdom: Animalia
- Phylum: Arthropoda
- Clade: Pancrustacea
- Class: Insecta
- Order: Coleoptera
- Suborder: Polyphaga
- Infraorder: Cucujiformia
- Family: Curculionidae
- Genus: Ips
- Species: I. woodi

Binomial name
- Ips woodi Thatcher, 1965

Species of beetle

Ips woodi is a species of typical bark beetle in the family Curculionidae. It is found in North America.
