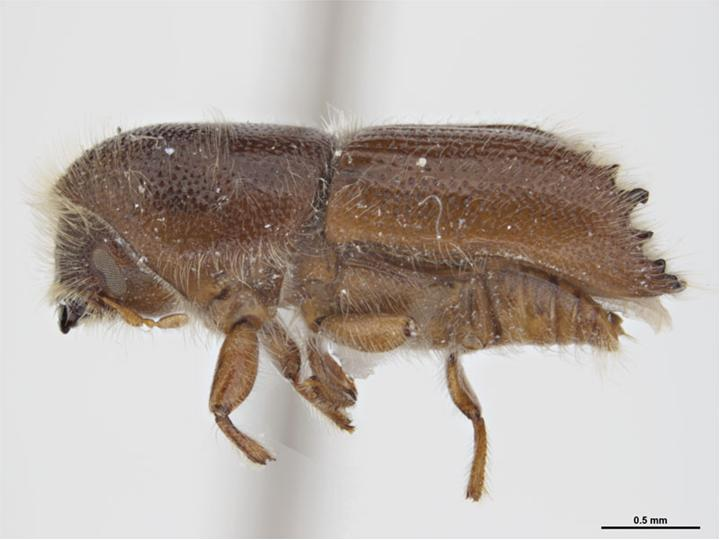

Scientific classification
- Kingdom: Animalia
- Phylum: Arthropoda
- Clade: Pancrustacea
- Class: Insecta
- Order: Coleoptera
- Suborder: Polyphaga
- Infraorder: Cucujiformia
- Family: Curculionidae
- Genus: Ips
- Species: I. paraconfusus

Binomial name
- Ips paraconfusus Lanier, 1970

= Ips paraconfusus =

Species of beetle

Ips paraconfusus, the California fivespined ips, is a species of typical bark beetle in the family Curculionidae. It is found in North America.
