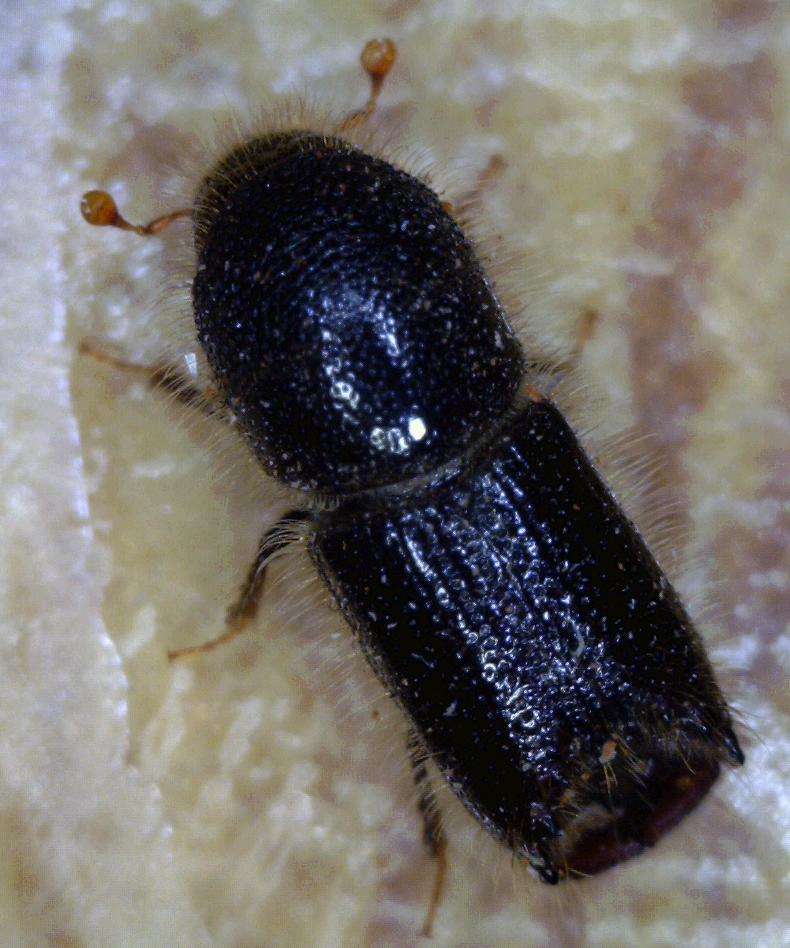

Scientific classification
- Kingdom: Animalia
- Phylum: Arthropoda
- Clade: Pancrustacea
- Class: Insecta
- Order: Coleoptera
- Suborder: Polyphaga
- Infraorder: Cucujiformia
- Superfamily: Curculionoidea
- Family: Curculionidae
- Genus: Ips
- Species: I. cembrae

Binomial name
- Ips cembrae Heer 1836

= Ips cembrae =

Species of beetle

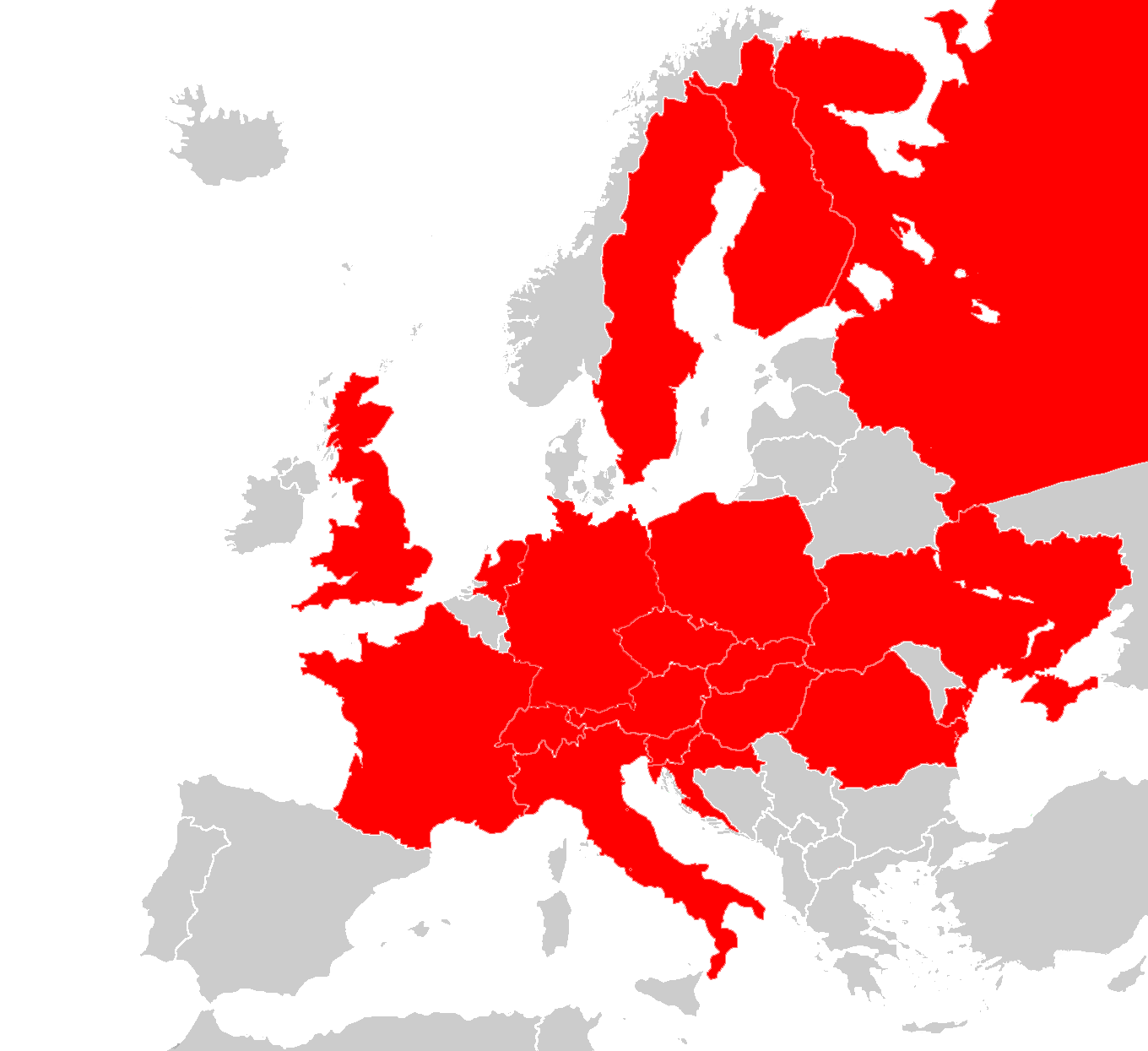
Distribution map

Ips cembrae, known generally as larch bark beetle or eight-toothed larch bark beetle, is a species of typical bark beetle in the family Curculionidae. Its habitat is Euro-Siberian, ranging from sea level to sub-alpine. It was first recorded in Great Britain in 1955. Populations were said to be found in Japan and China, but further research determined that those were actually Ips subelongatus.

The insect measures around 5 mm and has a dark brown to black colour. The species is considered hard to distinguish visually from Ips typographus.

== As a pest ==
Ips cembrae is native to most of its habitat and is considered less of a pest risk than Ips typographus. The beetle mainly affects the European larch, Larix decidua, especially during periods of drought. Besides damage from digging tunnels, the beetle also spreads fungi between trees.

== Parasites ==
The species can be infected by several nematodes: Contortylenchus, Parasitylenchus, Cryptaphelenchus, and Parasitorhabditis endoparasites, Micoletzkya under the wings as phoretic parasites. Laimaphelenchus and Bursaphelenchus are found in the frass.
