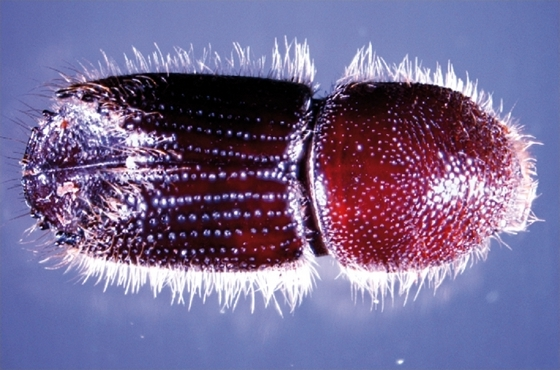

Scientific classification
- Domain: Eukaryota
- Kingdom: Animalia
- Phylum: Arthropoda
- Class: Insecta
- Order: Coleoptera
- Suborder: Polyphaga
- Infraorder: Cucujiformia
- Family: Curculionidae
- Genus: Ips
- Species: I. sexdentatus

Binomial name
- Ips sexdentatus (Börner, 1776)

Synonyms
- Dermestes sexdentatus Börner, 1776

= Ips sexdentatus =

Species of beetle

Ips sexdentatus is a species of bark beetle in the family Curculionidae. It is found in Europe.
