= (S)-Ipsdienol =

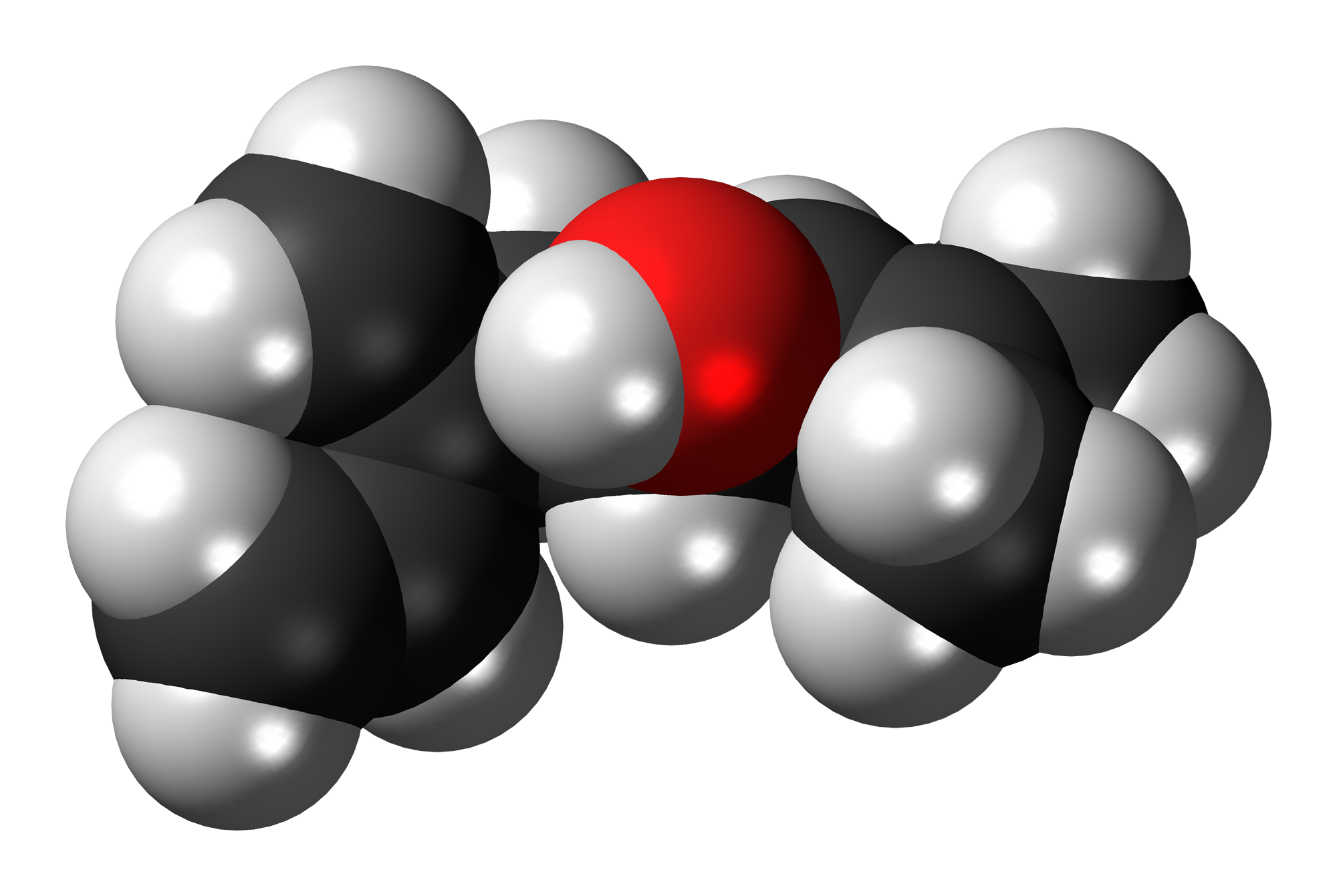

Names
- Preferred IUPAC name (4S)-2-Methyl-6-methylideneocta-2,7-dien-4-ol
- Other names (S)-(+)-Ipsdienol, 2-Methyl-6-methylene-2,7-octadiene-4-ol, Ipsdienol

Identifiers
CAS Number	35628-00-3
3D model (JSmol)	Interactive image
ChemSpider	83332
ECHA InfoCard	100.128.974
EC Number	609-154-9
PubChem CID	92301
UNII	I0CK35047X
CompTox Dashboard (EPA)	DTXSID50885627
- InChI: InChI=1S/C10H16O/c1-5-9(4)7-10(11)6-8(2)3/h5-6,10-11H,1,4,7H2,2-3H3/t10-/m1/s1 Key: NHMKYUHMPXBMFI-SNVBAGLBSA-N
- SMILES: CC(=C[C@H](CC(=C)C=C)O)C

Properties
Chemical formula	C_{10}H_{16}O
Molar mass	152.237 g·mol^{−1}
Appearance	Colorless

Hazards
- GHS labelling
Pictograms	(GHS09: Environmental hazard)
Signal word	Warning
Hazard statements	H400
Precautionary statements	P273, P391, P501
Flash point	87 °C (189 °F; 360 K)
- Except where otherwise noted, data are given for materials in their standard state (at 25 °C [77 °F], 100 kPa). Infobox references

(S)-Ipsdienol is a terpene alcohol. It is one of the major aggregation pheromones of the bark beetle. It was first identified from Ips confusus, in which it is believed to be a principle sex attractant. It is suggested that the compound plays a role in interspecies communication between Ips latidens and Ips ini, facilitating reductions in competition for breeding material and/or mating interference.

== Synthesis ==
The compound has been synthesized from D-mannitol. Alternative syntheses were realized through the asymmetric isoprenylation of correspondent aldehyde (prenal) and alcohol (prenol). Chiral resolution of racemic precursor has been found to provide both enantiomers of ipsdienol in high enantiomeric purity and in preparative scale.
