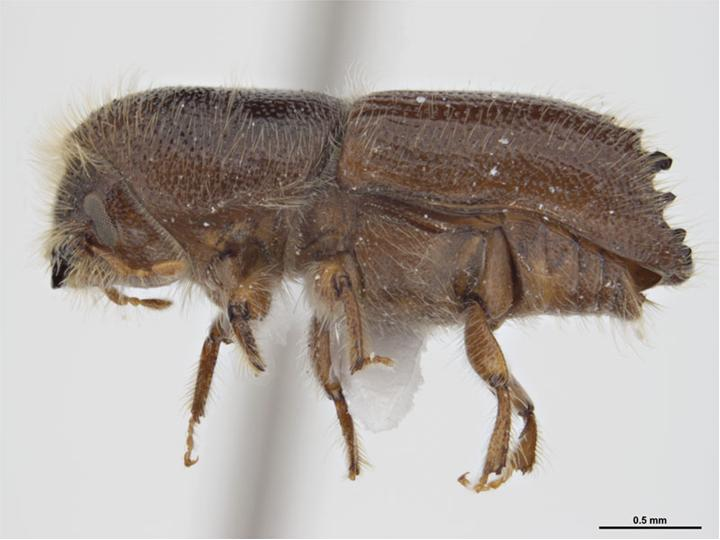
- Ips confusus

Scientific classification
- Kingdom: Animalia
- Phylum: Arthropoda
- Clade: Pancrustacea
- Class: Insecta
- Order: Coleoptera
- Suborder: Polyphaga
- Infraorder: Cucujiformia
- Superfamily: Curculionoidea
- Family: Curculionidae
- Subfamily: Scolytinae
- Tribe: Ipini
- Genus: Ips
- Species: I. confusus

Binomial name
- Ips confusus (LeConte, 1876)

= Ips confusus =

Species of beetle

Ips confusus, known generally as the pinyon pine beetle or pinyon ips, is a species of typical bark beetle in the family Curculionidae. It is found in Central America and North America.

== Description ==
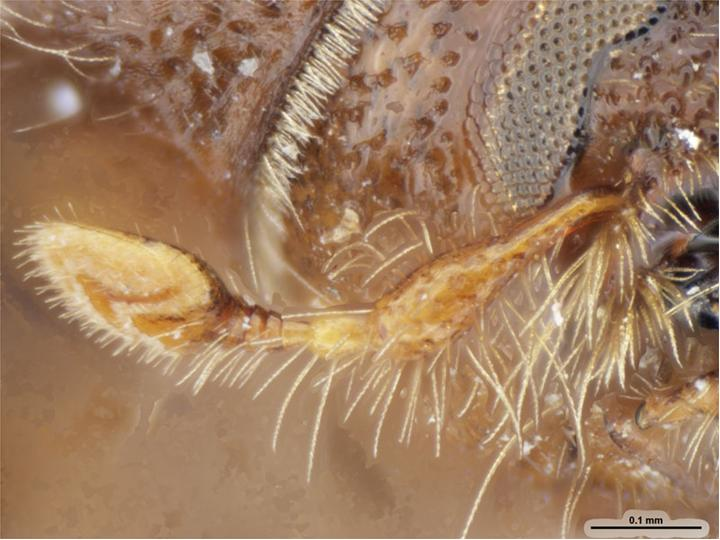
Ips confusus antenna

The pinyon ips is a small, brown, cylindrical bark beetle with spines on the distal portion of the abdomen, which is typical for this genus of bark beetles. Pinyon ips has five such spines. The adult’s length ranges between 1/8 inch (3.2 mm) and 1/4 inch (6.4 mm).

== Ecology ==
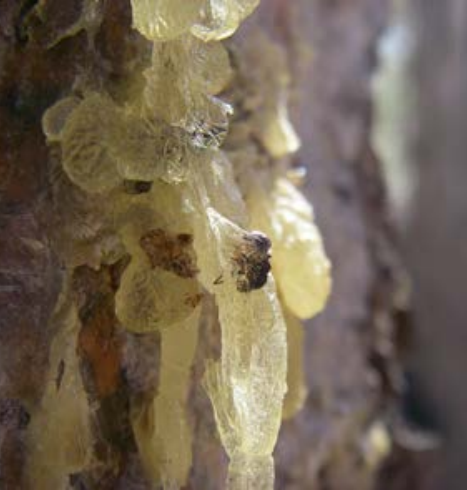
Ips confusus trapped by a globs of sap formed by pitch tubes from a pinyon pine

Ips confusus play an important role in pinyon-juniper forests by killing weak or damaged pinyon pine trees. This can improve habitat diversity, create canopy gaps allowing shade intolerant species in the seed bank to germinate, provide snag habitat, and contribute organic material to the soil.

The beetles cause tree mortalities by boring into the living tissues of the cambium layer just below the bark. They feed on xylem and phloem, disrupting the transportation and storage of water, nutrients, and sugar. Under normal circumstances, most healthy pinyons are not at risk of Ips infestations. However, beetle population booms, drought, comorbid fungal infections, or a combination of these can lead to an increased risk of infestation, even in healthy trees.

Pinyon pines respond to beetle attacks by creating pitch tubes – an inundation of sap at the site of the initial hole bored by the beetle. The sap defends the tree by pushing out the beetle and sealing the wound.

Water stress can compromise the effectiveness of the pitch tube defense, requiring less effort from the beetle for a successful infestation. Furthermore, slash left over from logging or thinning can provide a surplus of habitat for beetle populations to flourish. Pinyon engraver population booms can overwhelm even healthy trees, and often lead to widespread pinyon mortalities. If a beetle successfully bores into a pinyon, the sap that was once deployed as a defense now plays a role in attracting more beetles. The pinyon engraver bio-oxidizes terpenes present in the sap to produce pheromones signaling the location of a suitable host, which in turn draws free-flying beetles en masse to join the attack. As the number of beetles colonizing the ill-fated pinyon grow, so does the strength of the pheromone signal. Depending on environmental conditions and signal strength, some Ips species can detect and respond to this call from over eleven miles away.

== Reproduction ==
Generally, it is the male beetles that colonize the tree. Upon entry, their first task is to bore a nuptial chamber. This is an area suitable for the male and two to six females to mate. After mating, each female bores an egg gallery out from the nuptial chamber following along the grain of the wood.

In the egg galleries, the female will etch around 20 to 30 small niches where a single egg, packed in with debris, is laid. The eggs normally hatch after seven days. The larvae pupate after three to six weeks and emerge from the tree as adults, then follow the pheromone trail to the next potential host tree where the cycle starts again. The year’s first generation normally emerge in April or May, depending on temperatures. It is common for the pinyon engraver to produce three to four generations a year. Adults overwinter in the tree in sinuous feeding galleries.
