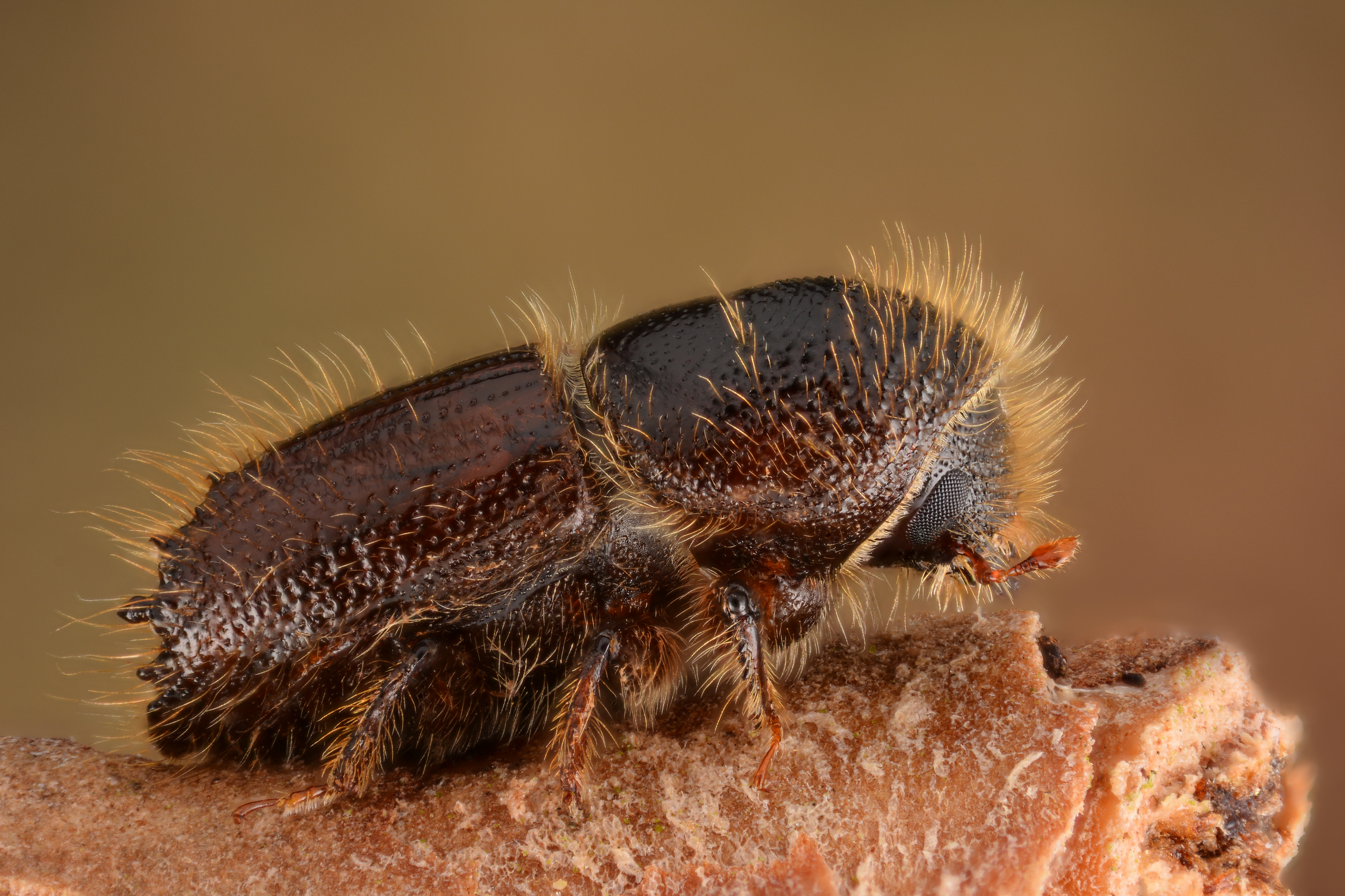
- Female

Scientific classification
- Kingdom: Animalia
- Phylum: Arthropoda
- Clade: Pancrustacea
- Class: Insecta
- Order: Coleoptera
- Suborder: Polyphaga
- Infraorder: Cucujiformia
- Superfamily: Curculionoidea
- Family: Curculionidae
- Subfamily: Scolytinae
- Genus: Ips
- Species: I. typographus

Binomial name
- Ips typographus (Linnaeus, 1758)

Synonyms
- Dermestes typographus L. Bostrichus octodentatus Paykull; Ips japonicus Niijima; Tomicus typographus Motschulsky

= European spruce bark beetle =

Species of beetle

The European spruce bark beetle (Ips typographus), also called the eight-toothed spruce bark beetle, is a species of beetle in the weevil subfamily Scolytinae, the bark beetles, and is found in Europe, Asia Minor and east to China, Japan, and Korea. As it moves from tree to tree, it brings wood-rotting fungi with it, destroying the commercial value of the timber. It creates branching galleries under the bark (in the phloem), weakening the tree; serious and prolonged infestations can create enough galleries to girdle and so kill the tree. It is a serious pest of Norway spruce, a major commercial forestry tree in Europe, but also affects pines, firs, and larches.

== Taxonomy ==
The species was first described as Dermestes typographus by the Swedish naturalist Carl Linnaeus in 1758. He gave it the specific name "typographus" (engraver), and it acquired the common name "engraver beetle" for the appearance of the galleries it makes in wood.

In 1800, the Swedish naturalist Gustaf von Paykull described it as Bostrichus octodentatus. In 1860, the Russian entomologist Victor Motschulsky synonymised the species as Tomicus typographus. In 1909, the Japanese entomologist Yoshinao Niijima described it as Ips japonicus; his generic name remains accepted for the species. Ips is a genus of bark beetles in the subfamily Scolytinae, in the beetle family Curculionidae.

== Biology ==
=== Description ===
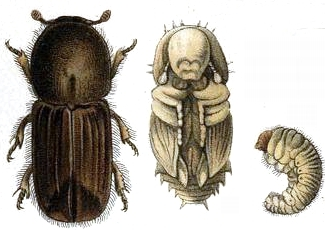
Adult, pupa, and larva

Adults are 4.2–5.5 millimetres (0.17–0.22 in) long, cylindrical, dark brown beetles. A large domed shield covers both the thorax and the head as viewed from the top; the eyes, antennae, and mouthparts protrude below the shield as seen from the side. The upper half of the abdomen is covered by the large elytra (wing-cases), which are marked with rows of small pits and which have four spines at each margin. There are yellow hairs around the sides of the body and between the elytra.

The beetles reproduce in the inner bark (phloem) of their host trees. Eggs, larvae, pupae and adults can all hibernate in their galleries below the bark of host trees. Adults can also overwinter in forest leaf litter or under snow that is at least 20cm deep. All stages overwintering in the bark of standing trees are killed by winter temperatures below -24°C. When the air temperature reaches around 18–20°C in spring, the adults start to fly. They travel up to half a mile in search of a vulnerable host. The adults burrow through the weakened bark of the host to build tunnels.

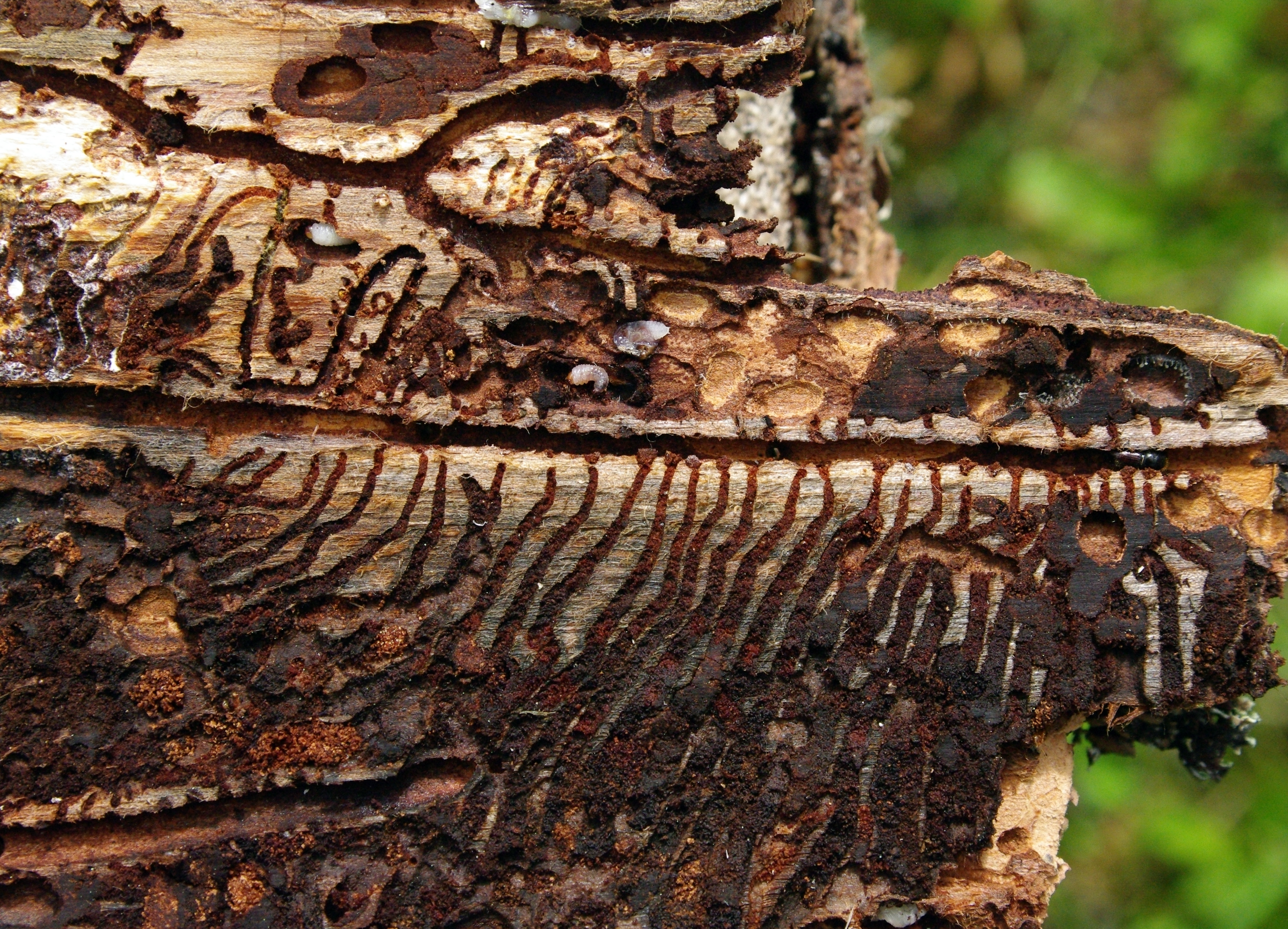
Gallery in wood. The broad tunnel from left to right is a maternal gallery. The eggs were laid along its sides in small niches. The larvae hatched from these and bored tunnels off to the side (tunnels running roughly vertically in the image). Some whitish larvae can be seen in holes in the top half of the image; the tunnels below the maternal gallery are mainly filled with reddish-brown frass.

The male hollows out a mating chamber, where between 1 and 4 females arrive to mate. Each female then creates a maternal gallery which runs in the same direction (vertically, if the tree is upright) as the phloem tubes. In warm conditions, she lays some 80 eggs, one at a time in separate niches on either side of the maternal gallery. There are fewer eggs in cold conditions.

The adults release pheromones which attract more individuals to the host tree. Two to five weeks after infesting a tree, they may migrate to another host and repeat the process. In the far north and in mountains, there may be only one generation annually; in lowland Europe, there are often two generations, while in the warmest conditions there can be three generations in a year.

The egg, below 1 millimetre (0.039 in) long, is whitish grey. The larva and pupa are whitish and reach about the same size as the adult. The larva is cylindrical, without legs; its head and jaws are brown. The larva makes a tunnel off to the side of the maternal gallery, and feeds on the phloem, not tunneling into the wood. If there is a sustained attack by enough larvae, the tree is eventually girdled, cutting off the phloem and killing the tree.

=== Ecology ===
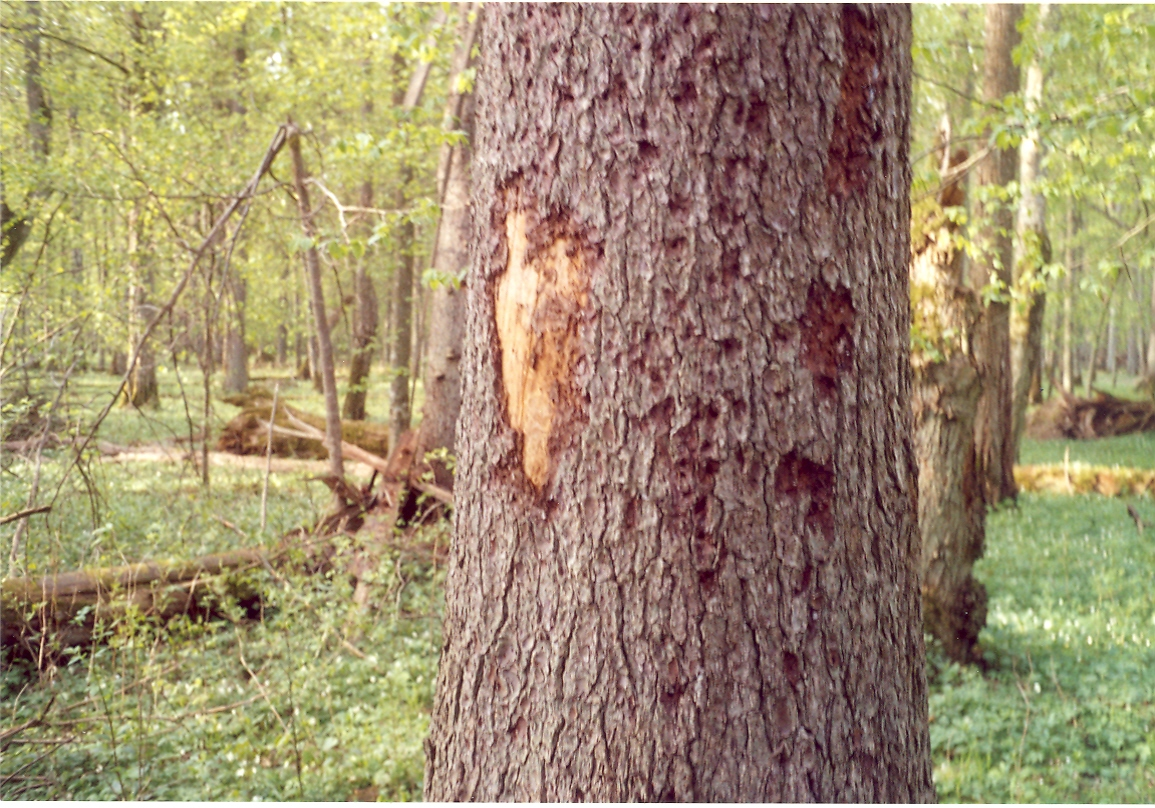
Bark beetle and woodpecker signs on spruce bark, 2007, Białowieża National Park, Poland. Woodpeckers often split off infested bark to feed on the beetle larvae.

European spruce bark beetle outbreaks are major natural disturbances in Europe's forests, as significant as storm damage. Some scientists consider the species to be a keystone species, because it has an unusually high number of relationships with other organisms in the community, and because it changes its environment so drastically.

Bark beetles are associated with species of fungi in the order Ophiostomatales, most often Ophiostoma bicolor, O. penicillatum, Ceratocystiopsis minuta, and C. polonica, with O. piceaperdum somewhat less common. Some of the fungi may help to regulate damage caused by the beetles. C. polonica on the other hand is a pathogen that can kill healthy trees by hindering the upward flow of water, wilting its foliage. It stains the wood with blue streaks, destroying its commercial value. The pits in the beetle's elytra help to carry fungal spores to uninfected trees, possibly facilitating beetle outbreaks.

Healthy trees use defenses by producing resin or latex, which contain insecticidal and fungicidal compounds that kill or injure attacking insects. But when trees are stressed, and under outbreak conditions, the beetles can overwhelm the tree's defenses. Woodpeckers may help to regulate beetle populations in diverse coniferous forest landscapes. Woodpeckers feed on the larvae, splitting off the bark to reach them. The species is somewhat larger than the bark beetle Pityogenes chalcographus; the species appear to reduce direct interspecific competition by selecting parts of the tree according to their size. Thus, I. typographus mostly selects lower parts of the tree with thicker bark, while P. chalcographus prefers higher parts with thinner bark as it is outcompeted in thick bark.

Bark beetles communicate with one another using semiochemicals, compounds or mixtures that carry messages. They can sense green leaf volatiles such as 1-Hexanol from trees.

European bark beetles have the ability to spread quickly over large areas. Long-distance movements may have contributed to their invasion of northern Norway spruce forests. Such movements can be triggered by environmental factors such as severe storms, drought, or mass fungal infections that damage or kill host trees.

=== Distribution ===
The beetle is distributed across Europe except for Ireland, Portugal, and the Caucasus. It is found in Algeria, Turkey, and Ira, as well as Russia, northern China, Korea, Japan, and Kazakhstan. It has occurred transiently in Britain. It occupies both lowland and upland forests.

The abundance of Norway spruce in Europe's forests has made it the main target of the beetle. Other tree species in the genera Picea (spruce), Abies (fir), Pinus (pine), and Larix (larch) are also attacked. The most recent spruce bark beetle invasive outbreaks have occurred mainly in fallen, diseased or damaged Norway spruce.

== Forestry ==
=== Economic impact ===
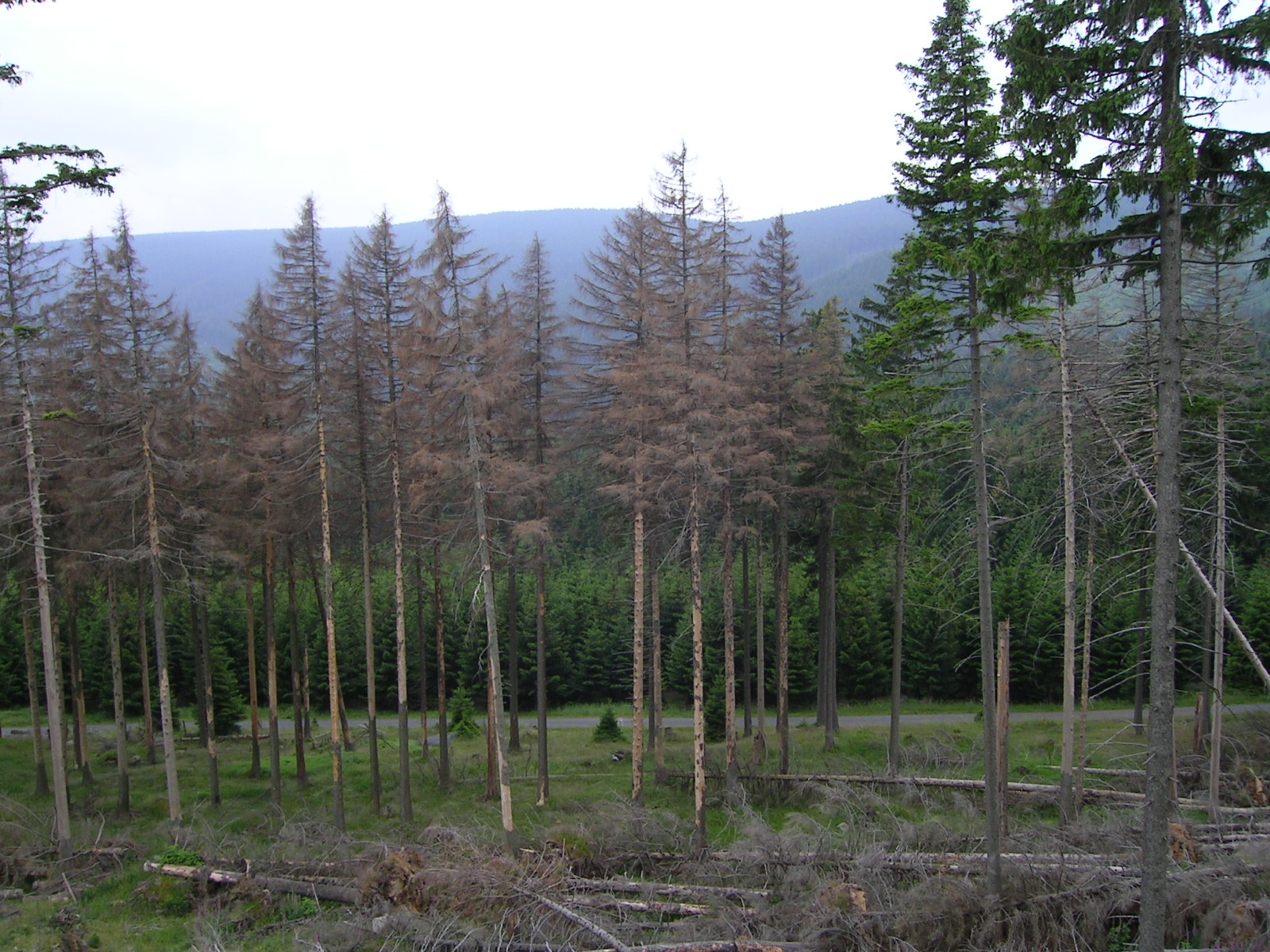
Stand of trees killed by the beetle in the Harz mountains, 2005

European spruce bark beetle outbreaks can be locally devastating for the lumber industry. The beetle is a serious pest of forestry; in Britain, where spruce is the main tree used for timber, it has been called "public enemy number one" of the over 1,400 pests and diseases on the government's plant health risk register.

=== Detection ===
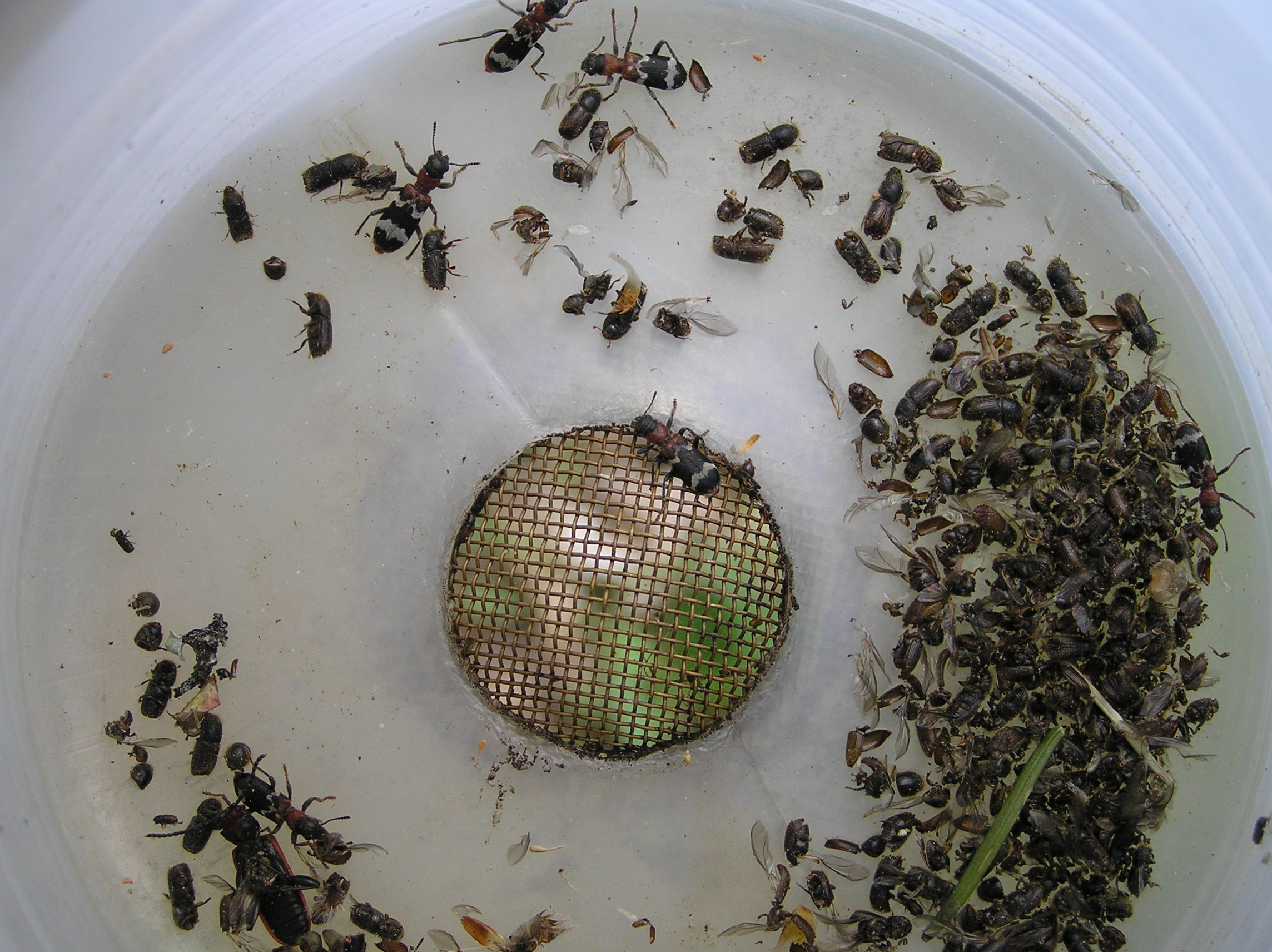
Sticky Borregard trap with European spruce bark beetles and Thanasimus formicarius beetles

Spruce beetles usually infest the lower and middle parts of trunks. Trees that have been attacked are easy to recognise by concentrations of brown dust from bark at the basal areas of stems and trunks. However, sometimes apparently infected trees with green crowns can be without bark because of larval and woodpecker activity. Other common ways that infection can be detected is the presence of red-brown dust (frass) in bark crevices, many round exit holes, or small pitch tubes extruding from the bark. Large populations can be detected from a distance by patches of red foliage.

=== Prevention and control methods ===
Several methods have been proposed to prevent the start of beetle outbreaks. Some suggest using "trap trees" at the beginning of each reproductive cycle. This should be done in March, May, and again in late June or early July. The trap trees should be debarked when distinct larval galleries with small larvae are found. Another method is clearcutting, removing sections of trees at the first signs of infestation. Pheromone traps can capture thousands of bark beetles, but while some studies found a strong reduction of damage in locations with pheromone traps, others found no effect or a slight increase in the risk of new attacks when pheromone traps were used.

In Britain, the main source of infestation has been insects carried by winds across the English Channel from continental Europe. In 2025 it was claimed that the beetle had been eradicated from risk areas in the east and south east by the combined use of monitoring using drones, inspection on the ground and sniffer dogs, along with the use of pheromone traps to detect and suppress beetle infestations. Climate change may increase the risk in the future.

=== Effects of interventions ===
Intervention for beetle outbreaks has been controversial in the Šumava National Park in the Bohemian Forest of the Czech Republic. Some authorities suggest that outbreaks be allowed to run their course, even at the expense of most of the forest. Others, including the lumber industry, request intervention. Some experts argue that salvage logging tends to have a greater negative effect on the vegetation than the bark beetle outbreak alone. A 2008 study of the effects of forestry interventions on the herb and moss layers of infested mountain spruce forests suggest that without intervention the forests do eventually recover. Salvage logging also had negative effects on species composition, delaying recovery.

== See also ==
- Great spruce bark beetle
- Six-toothed spruce beetle
