= Pterostilbene =

Names
- Preferred IUPAC name 4-[(E)-2-(3,5-Dimethoxyphenyl)ethen-1-yl]phenol
- Other names 3',5'-Dimethoxy-4-stilbenol; 3,5-Dimethoxy-4'-hydroxy-E-stilbene; 3',5'-Dimethoxy-resveratrol

Identifiers
CAS Number	537-42-8
3D model (JSmol)	Interactive image
ChEBI	CHEBI:8630
ChEMBL	ChEMBL83527
ChemSpider	4445042
ECHA InfoCard	100.122.141
IUPHAR/BPS	2681
PubChem CID	5281727
UNII	26R60S6A5I
CompTox Dashboard (EPA)	DTXSID9041106
- InChI: InChI=1S/C16H16O3/c1-18-15-9-13(10-16(11-15)19-2)4-3-12-5-7-14(17)8-6-12/h3-11,17H,1-2H3/b4-3+ Key: VLEUZFDZJKSGMX-ONEGZZNKSA-N; InChI=1S/C16H16O3/c1-18-15-9-13(10-16(11-15)19-2)4-3-12-5-7-14(17)8-6-12/h3-11,17H,1-2H3/b4-3+ Key: VLEUZFDZJKSGMX-ONEGZZNKBK; Key: VLEUZFDZJKSGMX-ONEGZZNKSA-N
- SMILES: O(c1cc(cc(OC)c1)\C=C\c2ccc(O)cc2)C

Properties
Chemical formula	C_{16}H_{16}O_{3}
Molar mass	256.301 g·mol^{−1}
- Except where otherwise noted, data are given for materials in their standard state (at 25 °C [77 °F], 100 kPa). Infobox references

Pterostilbene (/ˌtɛrəˈstɪlbiːn/) (trans-3,5-dimethoxy-4-hydroxystilbene) is a stilbenoid chemically related to resveratrol. In plants, it serves a defensive phytoalexin role.

== Natural occurrence ==
Pterostilbene is found in almonds, various Vaccinium berries (including blueberries), grape leaves and vines. It is also encountered in the xylem, particularly in the heartwood of Pterocarpus marsupium as well as in other species of the Pterocarpus family, including Malay padauk, the Narra tree (Pterocarpus indicus), Muninga and African padauk (Pterocarpus erinaceus), thus contributing to the high natural durability as a known phytoalexin.

== Biosynthesis ==
The enzyme trans-resveratrol di-O-methyltransferase adds two methyl groups to resveratrol. They are transferred from the cofactor, S-adenosyl methionine (SAM). The enzyme was characterised from Vitis vinifera (grapevine).

resveratrol
+ 2 SAM
pterostilbene
+ 2 SAH

== Safety and regulation ==
Pterostilbene is considered to be a corrosive substance, is dangerous upon exposure to the eyes, and is an environmental toxin, especially to aquatic life. A preliminary study of healthy human subjects given pterostilbene for 6–8 weeks, showed pterostilbene to be safe for human use at dosages up to 250 mg per day, although this study did not assess metabolic effects on the lipid profile.

Other studies have reported dose-based elevations of low density lipoprotein cholesterol (LDL-C, "bad cholesterol") and decreased high density lipoprotein cholesterol (HDL-C, "good cholesterol") within 4 to 8 weeks of daily dosing. The elevation of LDL-C may move previously normal ranges into borderline high or high reference range and has raised questions about the longterm cardiovascular risk of pterostilbene supplementation in humans.

Its chemical relative, resveratrol, received FDA GRAS status in 2007, and approval of synthetic resveratrol as a safe compound by the European Food Safety Authority (EFSA) in 2016. Pterostilbene differs from resveratrol by exhibiting increased bioavailability (80% compared to 20% in resveratrol) due to the presence of two methoxy groups which cause it to exhibit increased lipophilic and oral absorption.

== See also ==
- Piceatannol, a stilbenoid related to both resveratrol and pterostilbene
