= Astringin =

- Chemical structure of astringin

Names
- IUPAC name 3-[(E)-2-(2,3-Dihydroxyphenyl)ethen-1-yl]-5-hydroxyphenyl β-D-glucopyranoside
- Systematic IUPAC name (2S,3R,4S,5S,6R)-2-{3-[(E)-2-(3,4-Dihydroxyphenyl)ethen-1-yl]-5-hydroxyphenoxy}-6-(hydroxymethyl)oxane-3,4,5-triol

Identifiers
CAS Number	29884-49-9
3D model (JSmol)	Interactive image
ChEBI	CHEBI:2899
ChEMBL	ChEMBL358769
ChemSpider	4445028
PubChem CID	5281712
UNII	4ER6YKM4YL
CompTox Dashboard (EPA)	DTXSID401029689
- InChI: InChI=1S/C20H22O9/c21-9-16-17(25)18(26)19(27)20(29-16)28-13-6-11(5-12(22)8-13)2-1-10-3-4-14(23)15(24)7-10/h1-8,16-27H,9H2/b2-1+/t16-,17-,18+,19-,20-/m1/s1 Key: PERPNFLGJXUDDW-CUYWLFDKSA-N; InChI=1/C20H22O9/c21-9-16-17(25)18(26)19(27)20(29-16)28-13-6-11(5-12(22)8-13)2-1-10-3-4-14(23)15(24)7-10/h1-8,16-27H,9H2/b2-1+/t16-,17-,18+,19-,20-/m1/s1 Key: PERPNFLGJXUDDW-CUYWLFDKBH
- SMILES: O(c2cc(O)cc(\C=C\c1ccc(O)c(O)c1)c2)[C@@H]3O[C@@H]([C@@H](O)[C@H](O)[C@H]3O)CO

Properties
Chemical formula	C_{20}H_{22}O_{9}
Molar mass	406.387 g·mol^{−1}
- Except where otherwise noted, data are given for materials in their standard state (at 25 °C [77 °F], 100 kPa). verify (what is ?) Infobox references

Astringin is a stilbenoid, the 3-β-D-glucoside of piceatannol. It can be found in the bark of Picea sitchensis and Picea abies (Norway spruce).

It is also present in Vitis vinifera cells cultures and in wine.

== See also ==
- Phenolic compounds in wine
