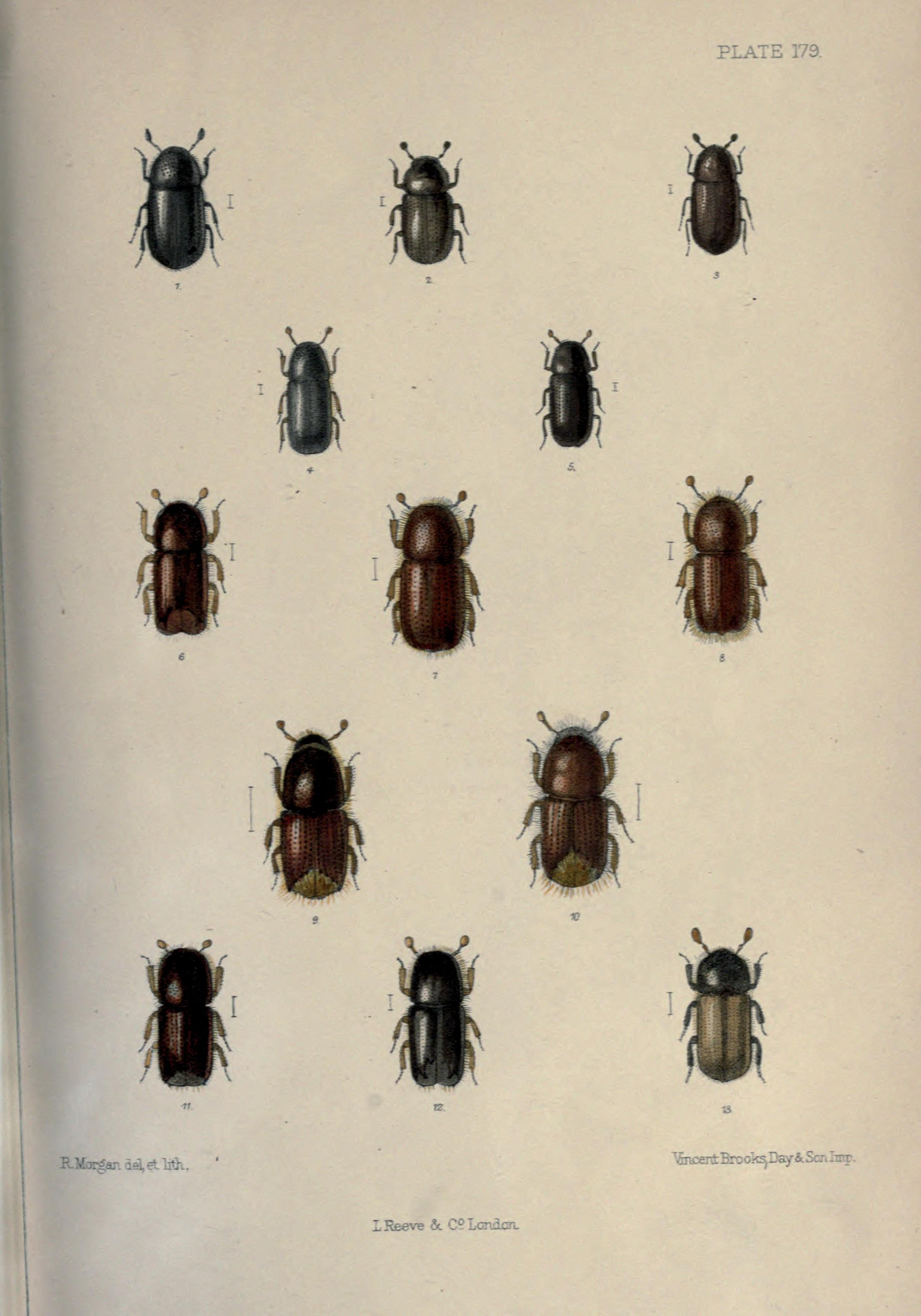
- Pityogenes bidentatus figure 12

Scientific classification
- Kingdom: Animalia
- Phylum: Arthropoda
- Class: Insecta
- Order: Coleoptera
- Suborder: Polyphaga
- Infraorder: Cucujiformia
- Family: Curculionidae
- Genus: Pityogenes
- Species: P. bidentatus

Binomial name
- Pityogenes bidentatus (Herbst, 1783)

= Pityogenes bidentatus =

Species of beetle

Pityogenes bidentatus is a species of bark beetle native to Europe. It has been introduced to North America.
