= Trans-resveratrol di-O-methyltransferase =

Identifiers
- EC no.: 2.1.1.240

Databases
- IntEnz: IntEnz view
- BRENDA: BRENDA entry
- ExPASy: NiceZyme view
- KEGG: KEGG entry
- MetaCyc: metabolic pathway
- PRIAM: profile
- PDB structures: RCSB PDB PDBe PDBsum
Search
- PMC: articles
- PubMed: articles
- NCBI: proteins

Trans-resveratrol di-O-methyltransferase (EC 2.1.1.240, ROMT, resveratrol O-methyltransferase, pterostilbene synthase) is an enzyme with systematic name S-adenosyl-L-methionine:trans-resveratrol 3,5-O-dimethyltransferase. It catalyses the following overall chemical reaction

resveratrol
+ 2 SAM
pterostilbene
+ 2 SAH

The enzyme adds two methyl groups, in sequence, to resveratrol. The first goes on one of the ortho positions in the ring which has two phenolic oxygens, followed by the other ortho group to produce pterostilbene. The methyl groups come from the cofactor, S-adenosyl methionine (SAM), which becomes S-adenosyl-L-homocysteine (SAH). The enzyme was characterised from Vitis vinifera (grapevine).
