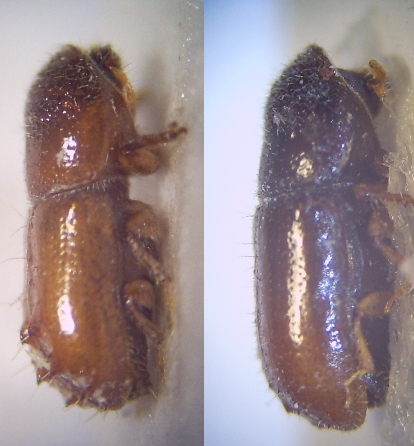
- Male (left) and female (right)

Scientific classification
- Kingdom: Animalia
- Phylum: Arthropoda
- Clade: Pancrustacea
- Class: Insecta
- Order: Coleoptera
- Suborder: Polyphaga
- Infraorder: Cucujiformia
- Superfamily: Curculionoidea
- Family: Curculionidae
- Subfamily: Scolytinae
- Genus: Pityogenes
- Species: P. chalcographus

Binomial name
- Pityogenes chalcographus (Linnaeus, 1767)

Synonyms
- Dermestes chalcographus

= Six-toothed spruce beetle =

Insect pest of forestry

The six-toothed spruce beetle, Pityogenes chalcographus is a bark beetle and a serious pest of commercial forestry of Norway spruce trees in Europe.

The adults burrow and mate in the phloem of the tree. The females lay eggs there, which hatch into larvae that each make a burrow, forming galleries which damage the phloem; in sufficient numbers, the damage can kill the tree.

== Taxonomic history ==
The Swedish botanist and physician Carl Linnaeus described the beetle as Dermestes chalcographus in 1767, in the 12th edition of his book Systema Naturae. In 1888, the French entomologist Ernest Marie Louis Bedel renamed the species when he erected the new genus Pityogenes.

== Biology ==
The six-toothed spruce beetle, Pityogenes chalcographus, is a species of bark beetle (subfamily Scolytinae). It primarily damages Norway spruce in stands that have been damaged by factors such as storm and drought, but can affect other coniferous trees. Trees at the southern limit of the Norway spruce's range in the Elatia forest of Northern Greece, with temperature and humidity only just tolerated by the trees, grow less well than those further north, making them more vulnerable to the beetle's attack.

Adults are small beetles, some 1.6 to 2.9 mm long. The head and thorax are black; the elytra (wing cases) can be black or reddish-brown. Each elytron bears three conical spikes or 'teeth', larger in males.

Chalcogran, one of the beetle's pheromones

The species favours thin-barked trees in sites exposed to sunshine. The male creates a mating chamber in the phloem of the host tree. Once they have started to feed, males produce pheromones that attract both males and females to the tree. Pheromone component chemicals include chalcogran and methyl (E,Z)-2,4-decadienoate. At the same time, the host tree releases monoterpenes such as alpha-pinene which increase the effect of the pheromones.

A group of some 5 or 6 females enter the chamber and mate with the male. The females then dig maternal galleries in which each female lays approximately 10 to 26 eggs. On hatching, each larva digs its own tunnel 2 to 4 cm long in the phloem at right angles to the maternal gallery. The larvae feed there for up to 6 weeks and then pupate. Newly-pupated adults feed nearby to build up their muscles and gonads before tunnelling through the bark and flying off.

Adults spend the winter in hibernation either under tree bark or in leaf litter; they fly and mate in the spring once the temperature reaches 16.8 to 17 °C. Larvae, pupae, and adults can survive cold winters down to -25 °C; adults can tolerate -39 °C while overwintering in diapause. In northern regions such as Scandinavia, there is only one generation each year, but further south in Central Europe there are two, both created by parent beetles from the previous year (so the two generations are sister broods).

The beetles carry spores of fungi in the order Ophiostomatales in pockets on their bodies; some of the fungi are mutualistic with the beetles, for example neutralising defensive chemicals produced by the trees.

Predators include other beetles, flies, hemipteran bugs, mites, and birds, along with parasitoid wasps. Pathogens and parasites range from viruses to microsporidia, entomopathogenic fungi, protists, and nematodes.

Adult female, 2.1 mm long

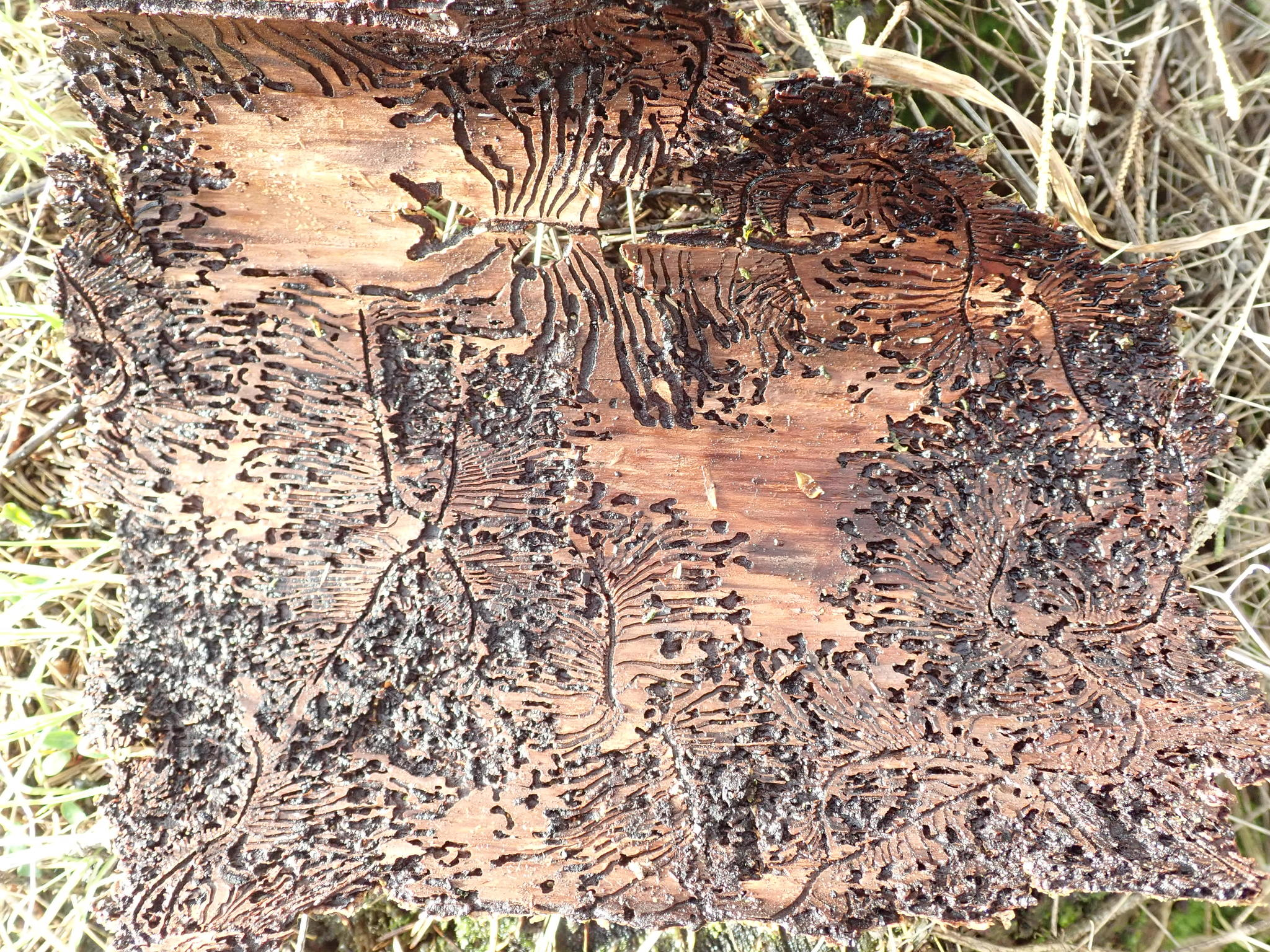
Maternal galleries with larval tunnels leading off them at right angles

== Forestry ==
The six-toothed spruce beetle is a serious pest of commercial forestry of Norway spruce trees in Europe. The beetles make galleries under the bark, sufficient in serious infestations to kill trees. It is second only to the European spruce bark beetle, Ips typographus, in its importance as a forestry pest in Central Europe. In an experiment where beetles were attracted to Norway spruces with a pheromone, the six-toothed spruce beetle killed only 8% of the trees on its own.

Spruce killed by the species, showing galleries made by the beetles under the bark

Larvae and adult in burrows in spruce bark

== See also ==
- Great spruce bark beetle
