= Piceatannol =

Names
- Preferred IUPAC name 4-[(E)-2-(3,5-Dihydroxyphenyl)ethen-1-yl]benzene-1,2-diol
- Other names 3',4',3,5-Tetrahydroxy-trans-stilbene; Astringinin

Identifiers
CAS Number	10083-24-6
3D model (JSmol)	Interactive image
ChEBI	CHEBI:28814
ChemSpider	581006
ECHA InfoCard	100.115.063
PubChem CID	667639
UNII	6KS3LS0D4F
CompTox Dashboard (EPA)	DTXSID6040587
- InChI: InChI=1S/C14H12O4/c15-11-5-10(6-12(16)8-11)2-1-9-3-4-13(17)14(18)7-9/h1-8,15-18H/b2-1+ Key: CDRPUGZCRXZLFL-OWOJBTEDSA-N; InChI=1/C14H12O4/c15-11-5-10(6-12(16)8-11)2-1-9-3-4-13(17)14(18)7-9/h1-8,15-18H/b2-1+ Key: CDRPUGZCRXZLFL-OWOJBTEDBC
- SMILES: C1=CC(=C(C=C1C=CC2=CC(=CC(=C2)O)O)O)O

Properties
Chemical formula	C_{14}H_{12}O_{4}
Molar mass	244.246 g·mol^{−1}
Appearance	white solid
Melting point	215–217 °C (419–423 °F; 488–490 K)
- Except where otherwise noted, data are given for materials in their standard state (at 25 °C [77 °F], 100 kPa). verify (what is ?) Infobox references

Piceatannol is the organic compound with the formula ((HO)_{2}C_{6}H_{3})_{2}CH)_{2}. It can be classified as a stilbenoid, a phenol, and a polyphenol. It is a white solid, although samples often are yellow owing to impurities. The chemical structure of piceatannol was established as being an analog of resveratrol.

== Natural occurrences ==
Piceatannol and its glucoside, astringin, are found in mycorrhizal and non-mycorrhizal roots of Norway spruces (Picea abies). It can also be found in the seeds of the palm Aiphanes horrida and in Gnetum cleistostachyum. Passion fruit seeds are rich in piceatannol and scirpusin B (dimer of piceatannol).

=== In food ===
Piceatannol is a metabolite of resveratrol found in red wine, grapes, passion fruit, white tea, and Japanese knotweed. Astringin, a piceatannol glucoside, is also found in red wine. The formation of piceatannol from resveratrol is catalyzed by cytochrome P450.

== Biochemistry ==
Piceattanol acts as an inhibitor of the tyrosine kinase Syk and some related tyrosine kinases. In the early 2000s, this prompted research interest in piceatannol and its effect on immune or inflammatory diseases.

Injected in rats, piceatannol shows a rapid glucuronidation and a poor bioavailability, according to a 2006 study.

Piceatannol affect gene expressions, gene functions and insulin action, resulting in the delay or complete inhibition of adipogenesis.

== See also ==
- Pterostilbene
- List of phytochemicals in food
