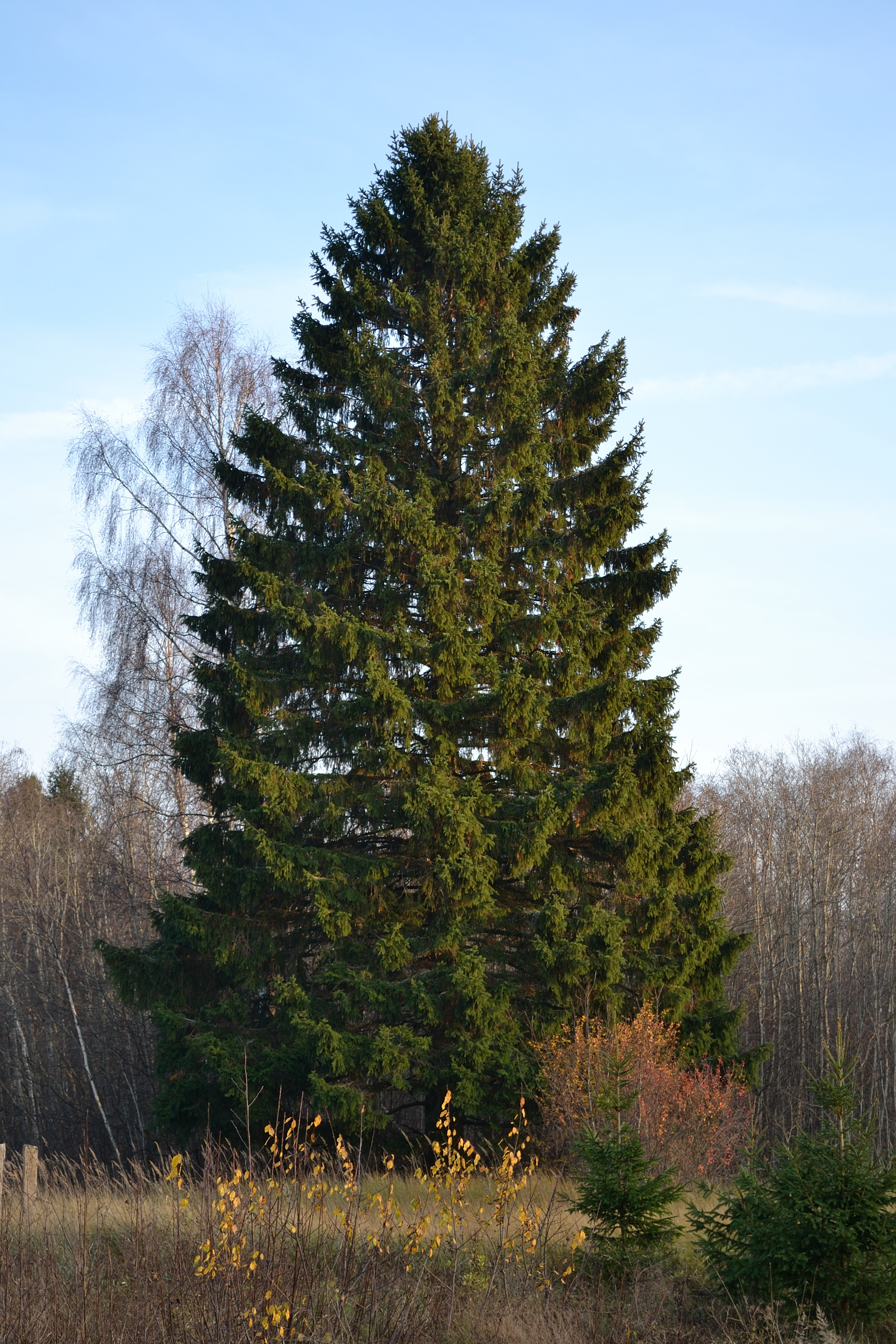

Conservation status
- Least Concern (IUCN 3.1)

Scientific classification
- Kingdom: Plantae
- Clade: Tracheophytes
- Clade: Gymnosperms
- Division: Pinophyta
- Class: Pinopsida
- Order: Pinales
- Family: Pinaceae
- Genus: Picea
- Species: P. abies

Binomial name
- Picea abies (L.) H. Karst.
- Native range ✖ Isolated population Introduced and naturalised (synanthropic) area ▲ Isolated population

Synonyms
- see text

= Picea abies =

Norway spruce

Species of plant

Picea abies, the Norway spruce, is a species of spruce native to Northern, Central and Eastern Europe. It has branchlets that typically hang downwards, and the longest cones of any spruce, 9–20 cm long. It is usually considered most closely related to the Siberian spruce (Picea obovata), which replaces it east of the Ural Mountains, and with which it hybridises freely, but its phylogeny has been disputed.

The species is one of the most widely planted spruces, both in and outside of its native range, and is one of the most economically important conifers in Europe. Major forestry pests that affect the species include the European spruce bark beetle, the large pine weevil, and the black arches moth. Fungal diseases that can kill the tree include Armillaria root rot and red rot caused by Heterobasidion annosum. The species has a wide distribution, is widely planted for its wood, and is used as a Christmas tree in several countries around the world. It was the first gymnosperm to have its genome sequenced.

== Description ==
Norway spruce is a large, fast-growing evergreen coniferous tree growing 35–55 m (115–180 ft) tall and with a trunk diameter of 1 to 1.5 m. It can grow fast when young, up to 1 m per year for the first 25 years under good conditions, but becomes slower once over 20 m (65 ft) tall. The Latin specific epithet abies means "like a fir tree". The shoots are orange-brown and hairless. The leaves are needle-like with blunt tips, 15–25 mm long, quadrangular in cross-section and dark green on all four sides with inconspicuous stomatal lines. The seed cones are 9–20 cm long (the longest of any spruce) and have bluntly to sharply triangular-pointed scale tips. They are green or reddish, maturing brown 5–7 months after pollination. The seeds are black, 4–5 mm long, with a pale brown 15 mm wing. The tallest measured Norway spruce is 205.75 ft (62.71 m) tall and grows near Ribnica na Pohorju, Slovenia.

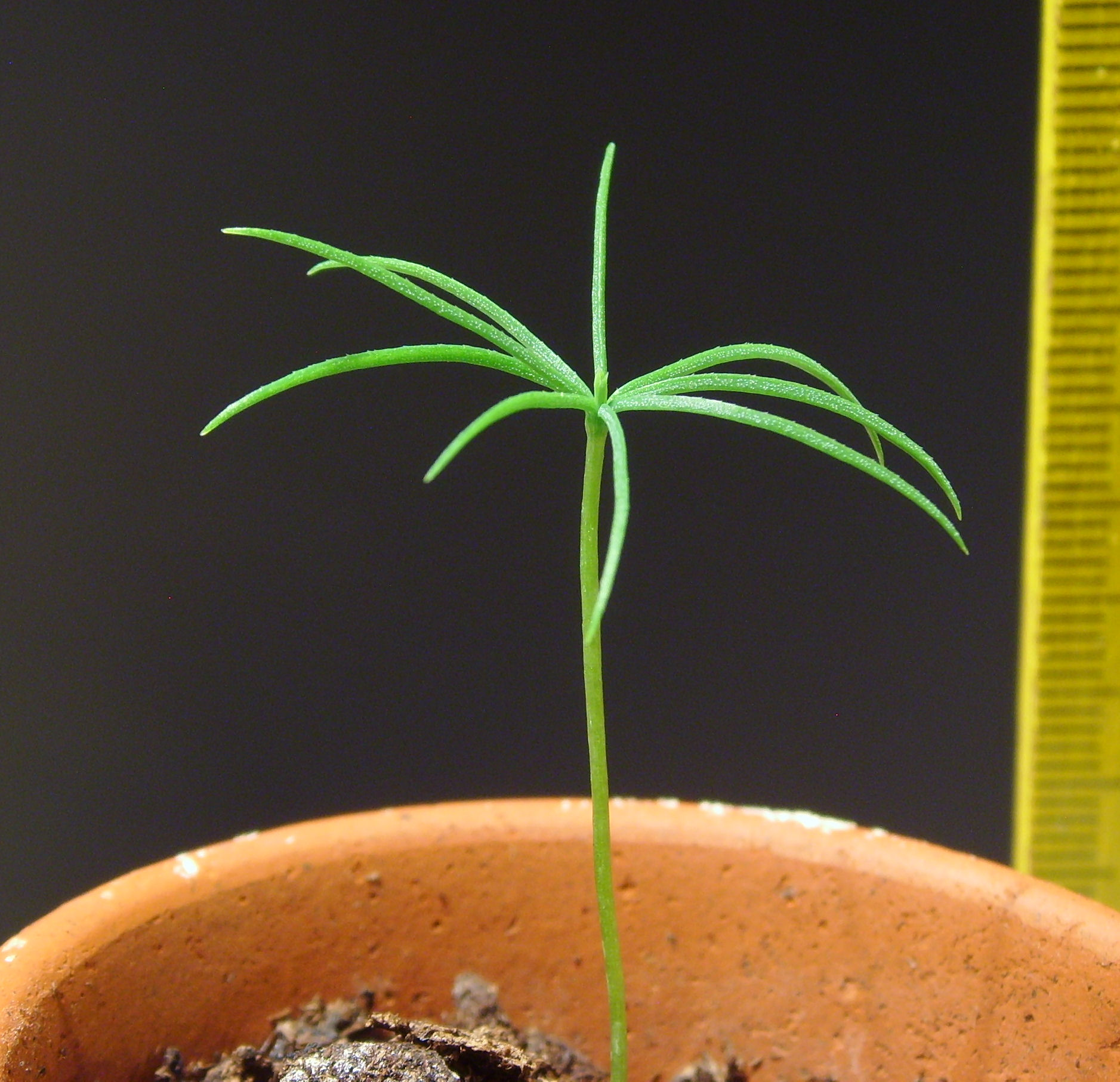
Seedling c. 20 days old

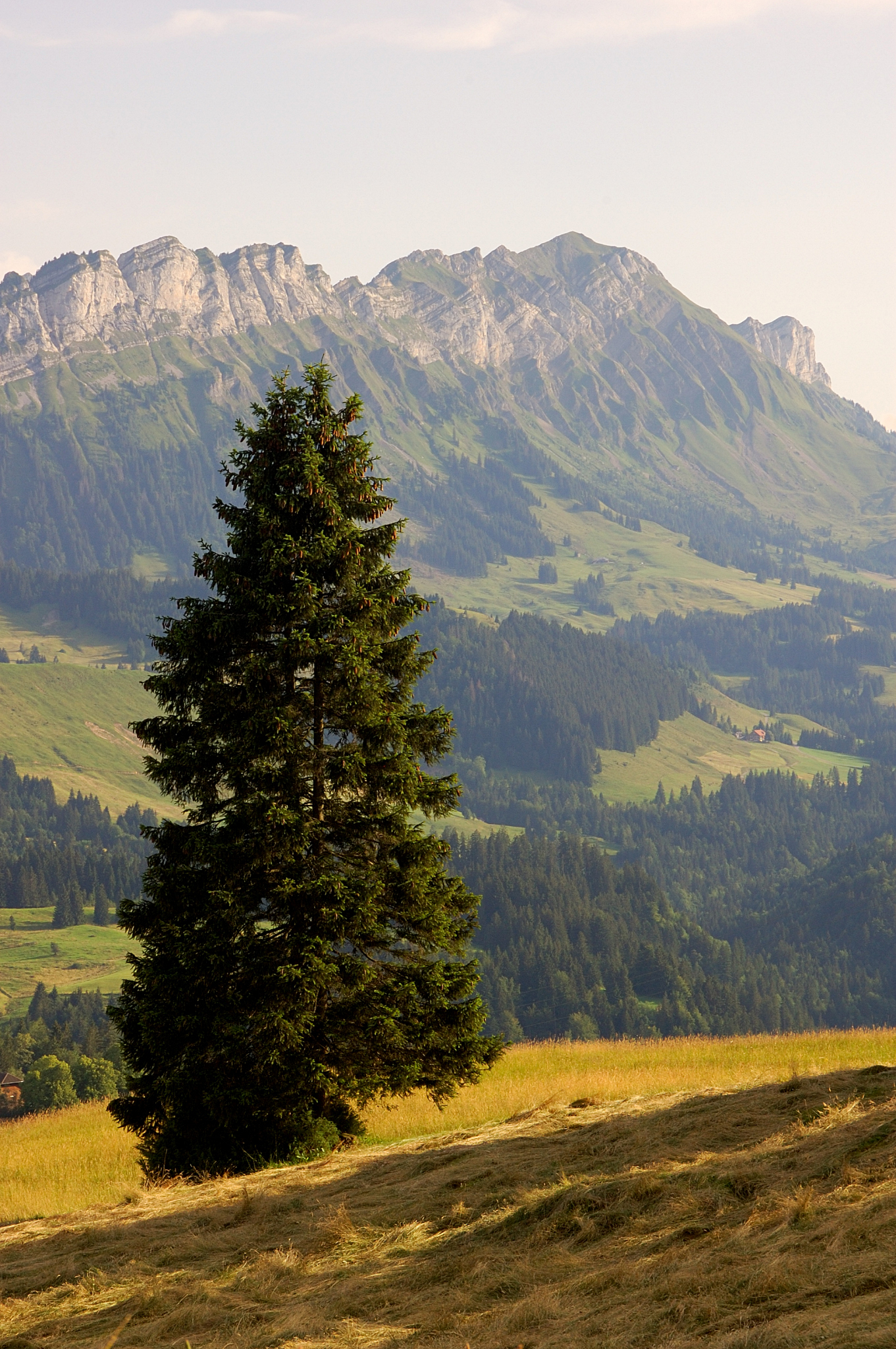
Habit

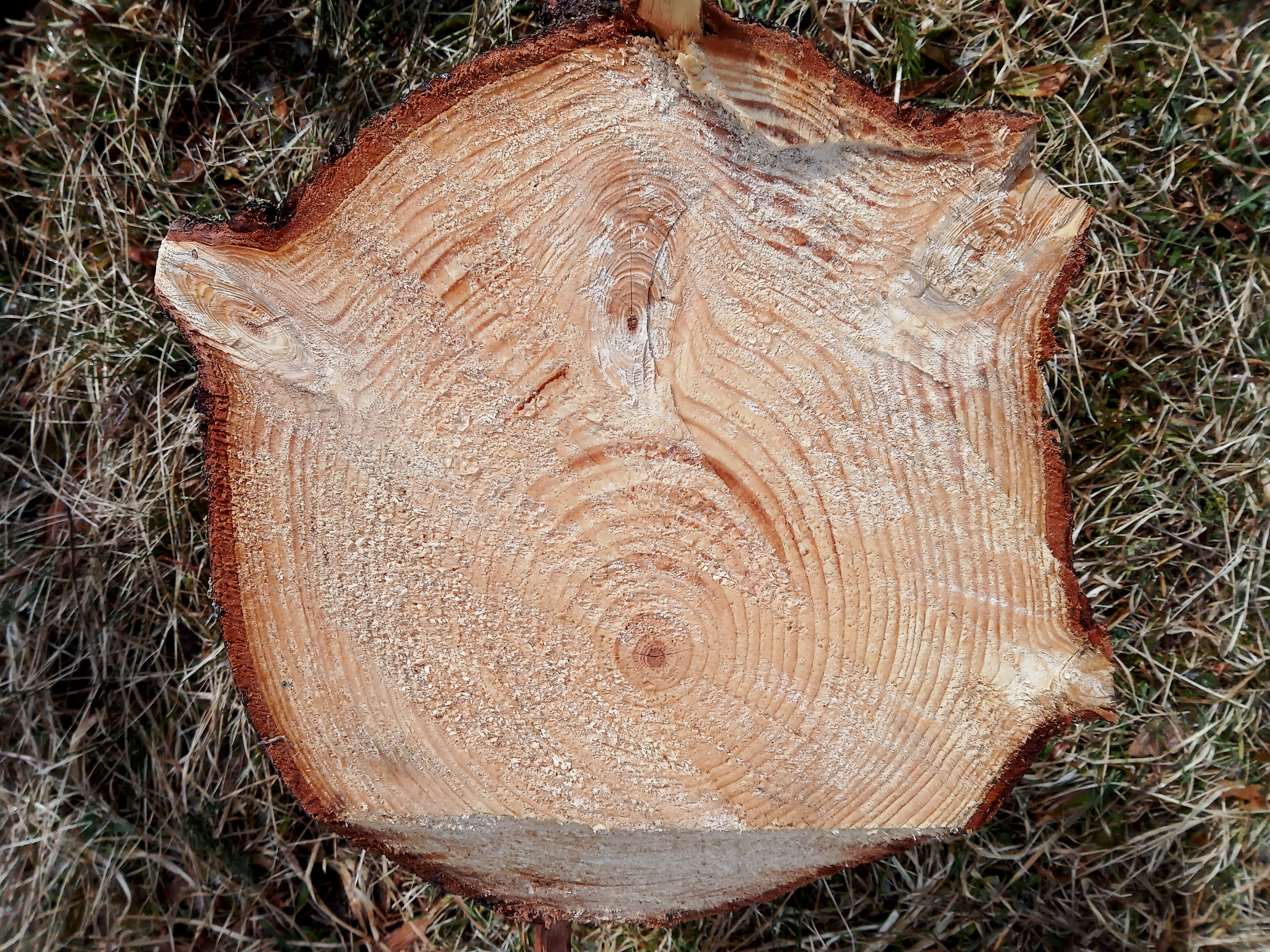
Cross-section of trunk showing growth rings and branches (knots)

Foliage and buds

Male cones

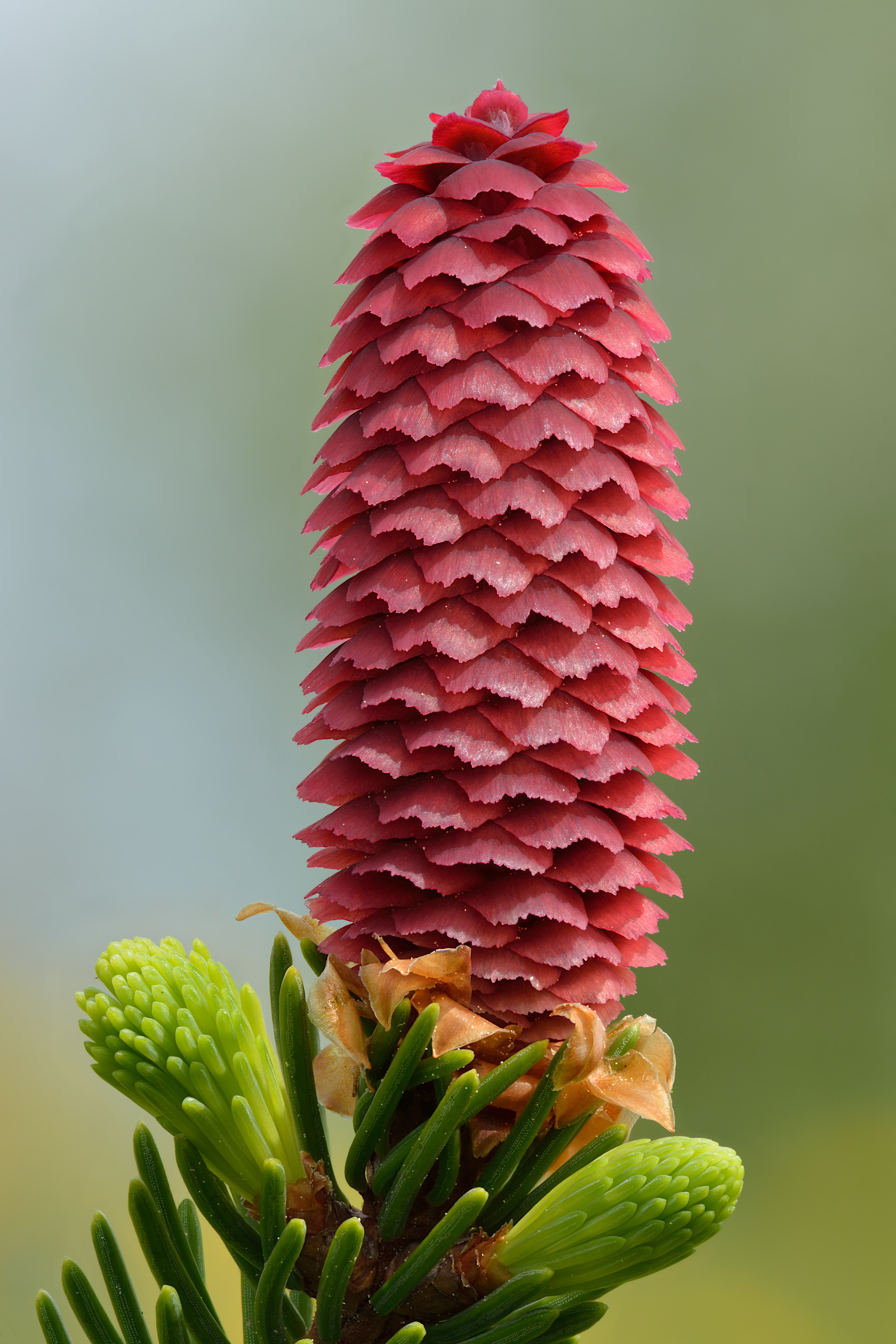
Young female cone

Foliage and opening mature cones

Seeds (winged and detached)

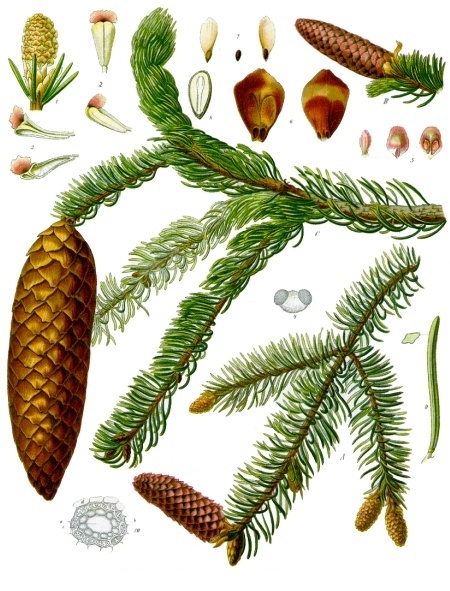
Botanical illustration from Köhler's Medicinal Plants

== Range ==
The Norway spruce grows throughout Europe from Norway in the northwest and Poland eastward, and also in the mountains of central Europe, southwest to the western end of the Alps, and southeast in the Carpathians and Balkans to the extreme north of Greece. The northern limit is in the arctic, just north of 70° N in Norway. Its eastern limit in Russia is hard to define owing to extensive hybridisation and intergradation with the Siberian spruce but is usually given as the Ural Mountains. However trees showing some Siberian spruce characters extend as far west as much of northern Finland, with a few records in northeast Norway. The hybrid is known as Picea × fennica (or P. abies subsp. fennica, if the two taxa are considered subspecies), and can be distinguished by a tendency to have hairy shoots and cones with smoothly rounded scales.

The tree tolerates acidic soils well, but does not do well on dry or deficient soils. From 1928 until the 1960s it was planted on surface mine spoils in Indiana.

== Ecology ==
The Norway spruce is Europe's forest tree most at risk from pests such as bark beetles and diseases such as rot caused by fungi, and it is expected that this risk will increase as global warming proceeds.

The European spruce bark beetle Ips typographus is the most serious insect pest of Norway spruce in Europe. It and the six-toothed spruce beetle Pityogenes chalcographus are among 39 bark beetles that have spruce as their host, but most of them are problematic only when trees are already damaged or weakened; I. typographus and P. chalcographus are exceptional in being able to harm healthy trees. Other serious pests are the large pine weevil, Hylobius abietis, whose adults eat the bark and cambium, and the black arches moth Lymantria monacha whose caterpillars eat the leaves. The web-spinning sawfly Cephalcia abietis can defoliate trees over 60 years old in forests over 600 metres altitude; this can kill trees or weaken them sufficiently for bark beetles to become problematic.

Fungi that damage the Norway spruce include species of Armillaria which cause a root rot; in already weakened trees, this can spread through the cambium under the bark, fatally girdling the tree. Heterobasidion annosum causes a red rot of the roots and then a white rot in the tree's stem, spoiling the wood for commercial use.

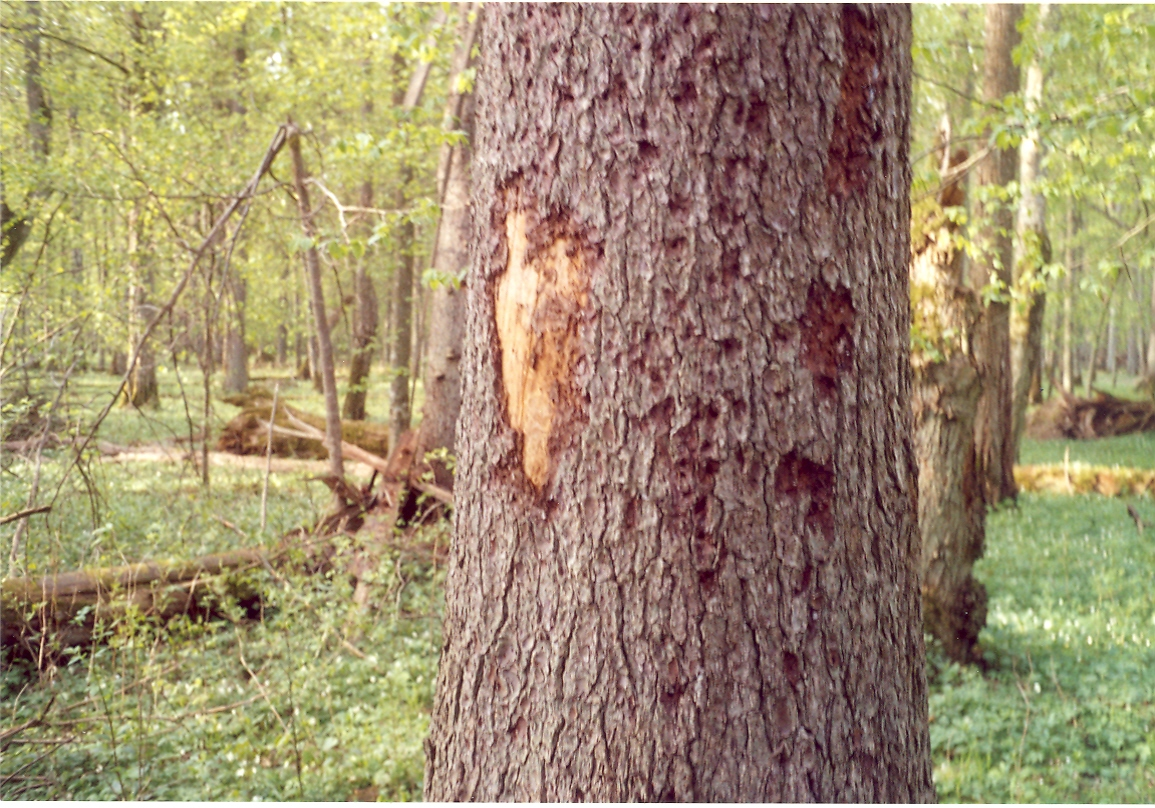
Bark beetle and woodpecker signs on spruce bark, 2007, Białowieża National Park, Poland. Woodpeckers often split off infested bark to feed on the beetle larvae.

Pityogenes chalcographus larvae and adult in burrows in spruce bark

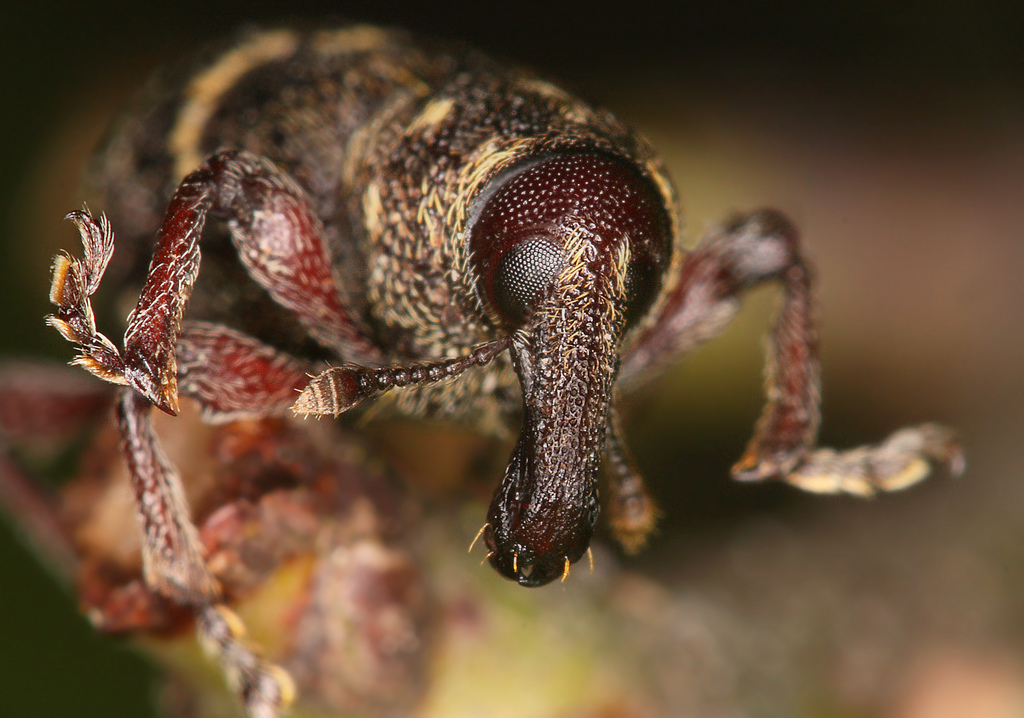
Adult large pine weevil damages the bark and cambium.

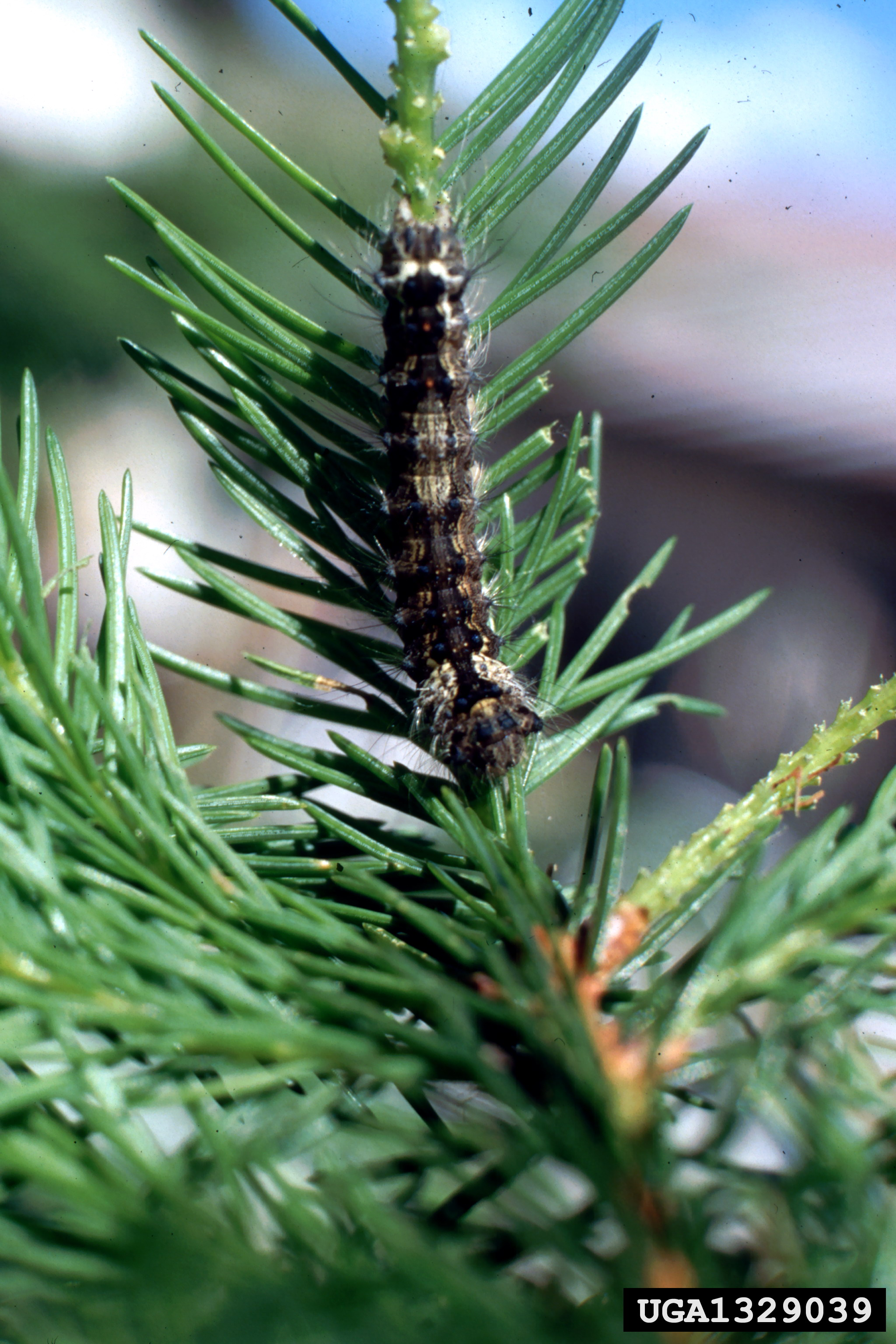
Lymantria monacha larva on twig with bitten-off leaves

Heterobasidion annosum causes Annosus root rot.

== Evolution ==
=== Taxonomic history ===
The species was described by the Swedish botanist Carl Linnaeus as Pinus abies in 1753. In 1824, Albert Dietrich set up the genus Picea. The species was transferred to the genus Picea by the German botanist Gustav Karl Wilhelm Hermann Karsten in 1881.

=== Variability ===
Populations in southeast Europe tend to have longer cones with more pointed scales; these are sometimes distinguished as Picea abies var. acuminata, but there is extensive overlap in variation with trees from other parts of the range.

Some botanists treat Siberian spruce (P. obovata) as a subspecies of Norway spruce, though in their typical forms they are very distinct, the Siberian spruce having cones only 5–10 cm long, with smoothly rounded scales and pubescent shoots. Genetically Norway and Siberian spruces were thought to be extremely similar and often considered as two closely related subspecies of P. abies, but more recent studies have suggested that the relationships of P. obovata may be closer to a group of east Asian spruces including P. asperata and P. meyeri, than to P. abies.

The alpine spruce (Picea alpestris) hybridises extensively with Norway spruce; pure specimens are rare. It has thicker blue-green leaves, smoothly rounded cone scales, and hairy shoots, and occurs rarely in the Central Alps in eastern Switzerland. Many texts treat it as a variant of Norway spruce, but it is as distinct as many other spruces and appears to be more closely related to Siberian spruce (P. obovata), Schrenk's spruce (P. schrenkiana) from central Asia and Morinda spruce (P. smithiana) from the Himalayas.

== Cultivation ==
The Norway spruce is one of the most widely planted spruces, both in and outside of its native range, and one of the most economically important coniferous species in Europe. In North America Norway spruce is widely planted, specifically in the Northeastern, Pacific Coast, and Rocky Mountain states, as well as in southeastern Canada. It is naturalised in some parts of North America. Naturalised populations occur from Connecticut to Michigan, and probably elsewhere. Norway spruces prefer cool-summer areas and they will grow up to USDA Growing Zone 7, except along the west coast where summers are cool enough even in parts of USDA Growing Zone 10 (Sunset Climate Zones 14-17).

=== Cultivars ===
Cultivars of the Norway spruce are occasionally traded under the obsolete scientific name Picea excelsa (an illegitimate name). The following cultivars have gained the Royal Horticultural Society's Award of Garden Merit:

- 'Acrocona' – 4 m (13 ft) tall and broad
- 'Clanbrassiliana' – 1.2 m (3.9 ft) tall by 2.4 m (7.9 ft) broad
- 'Inversa' – 9 m (30 ft) tall by 4 m (13 ft) broad
- 'Little Gem' – 0.5 m (1.6 ft) tall and broad
- 'Nidiformis' – 1.5 m (4.9 ft) tall by 4 m (13 ft) broad
- 'Rydal' very hardy
Cultivars

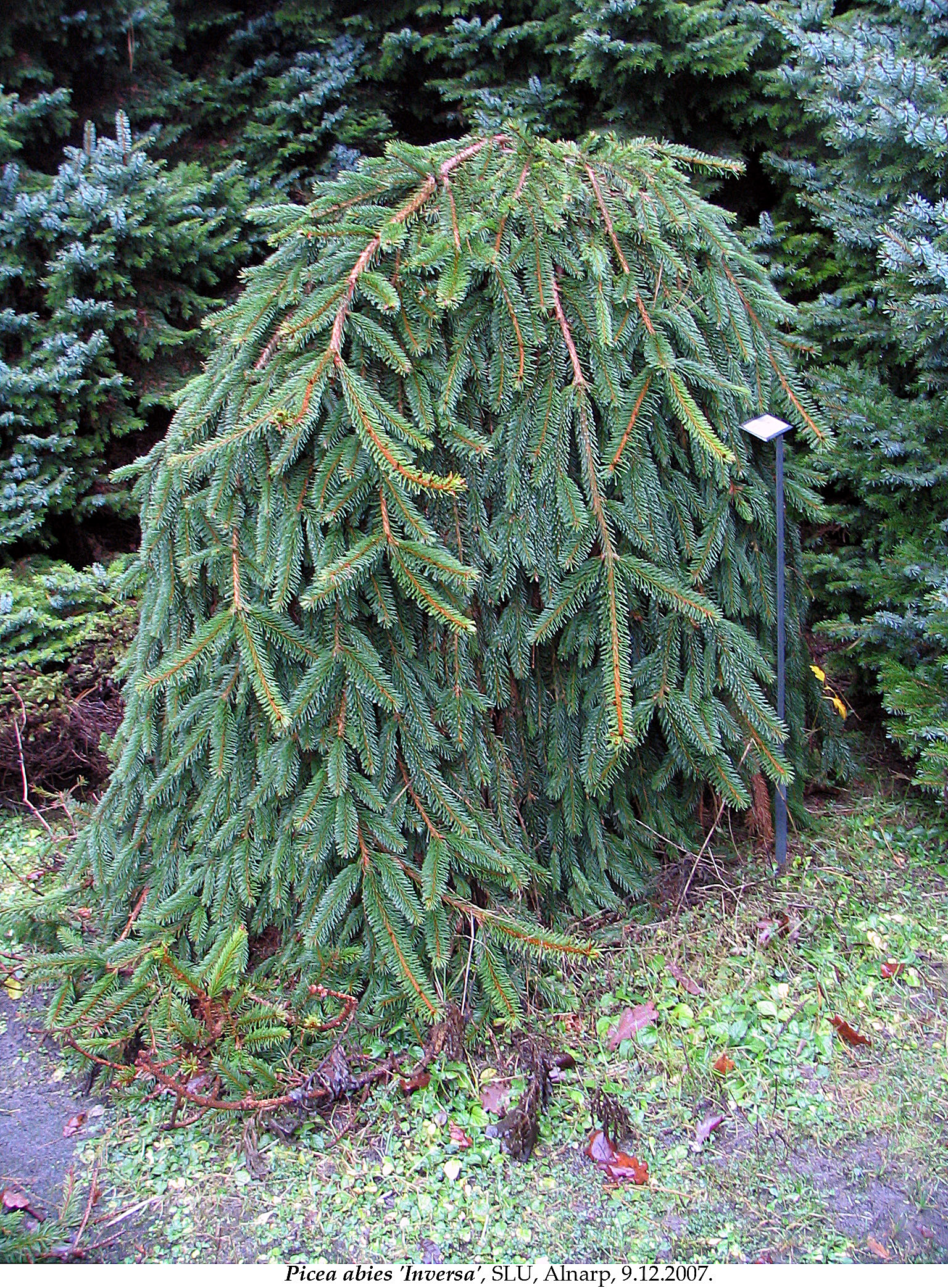
'Inversa'

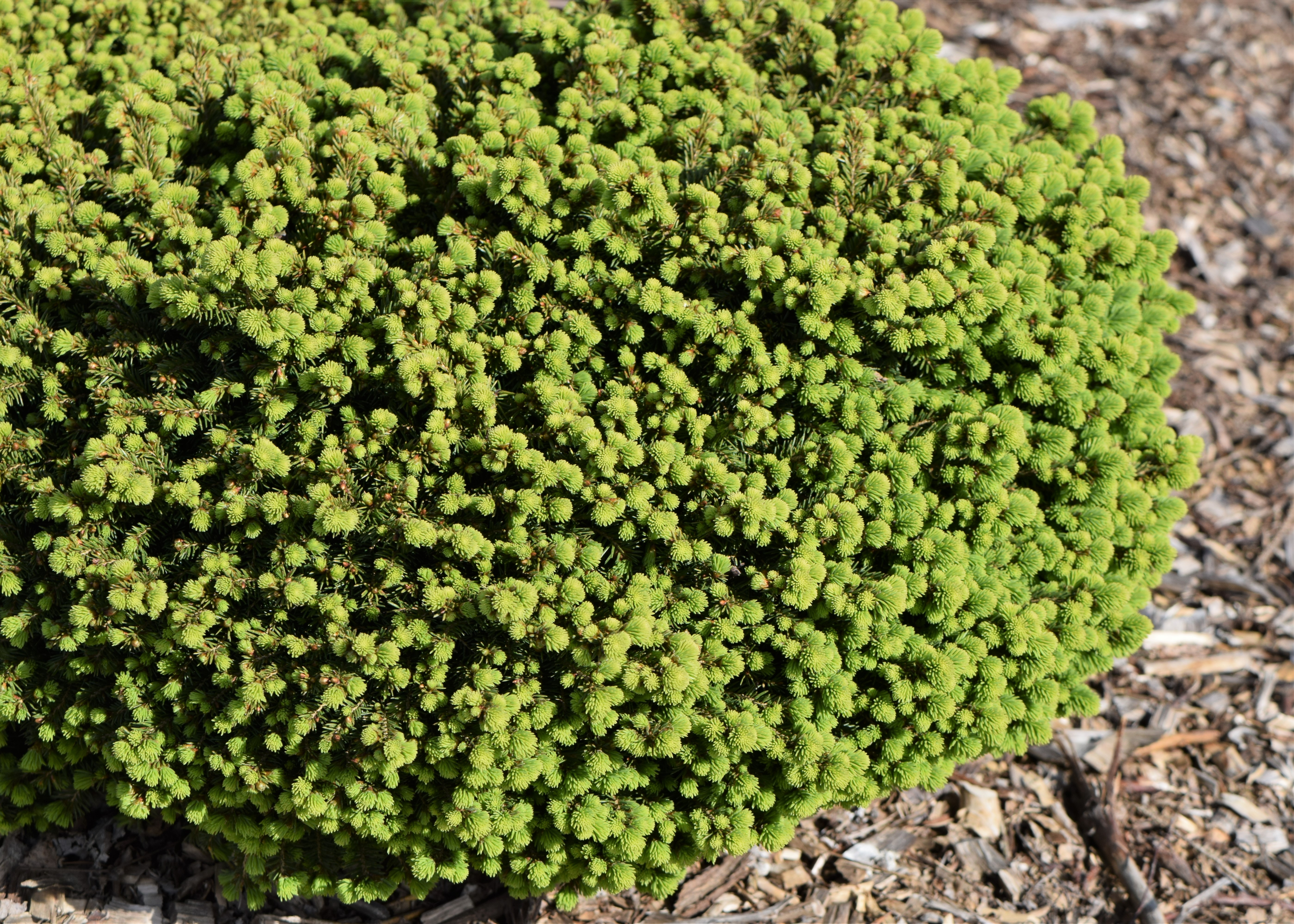
'Little Gem'

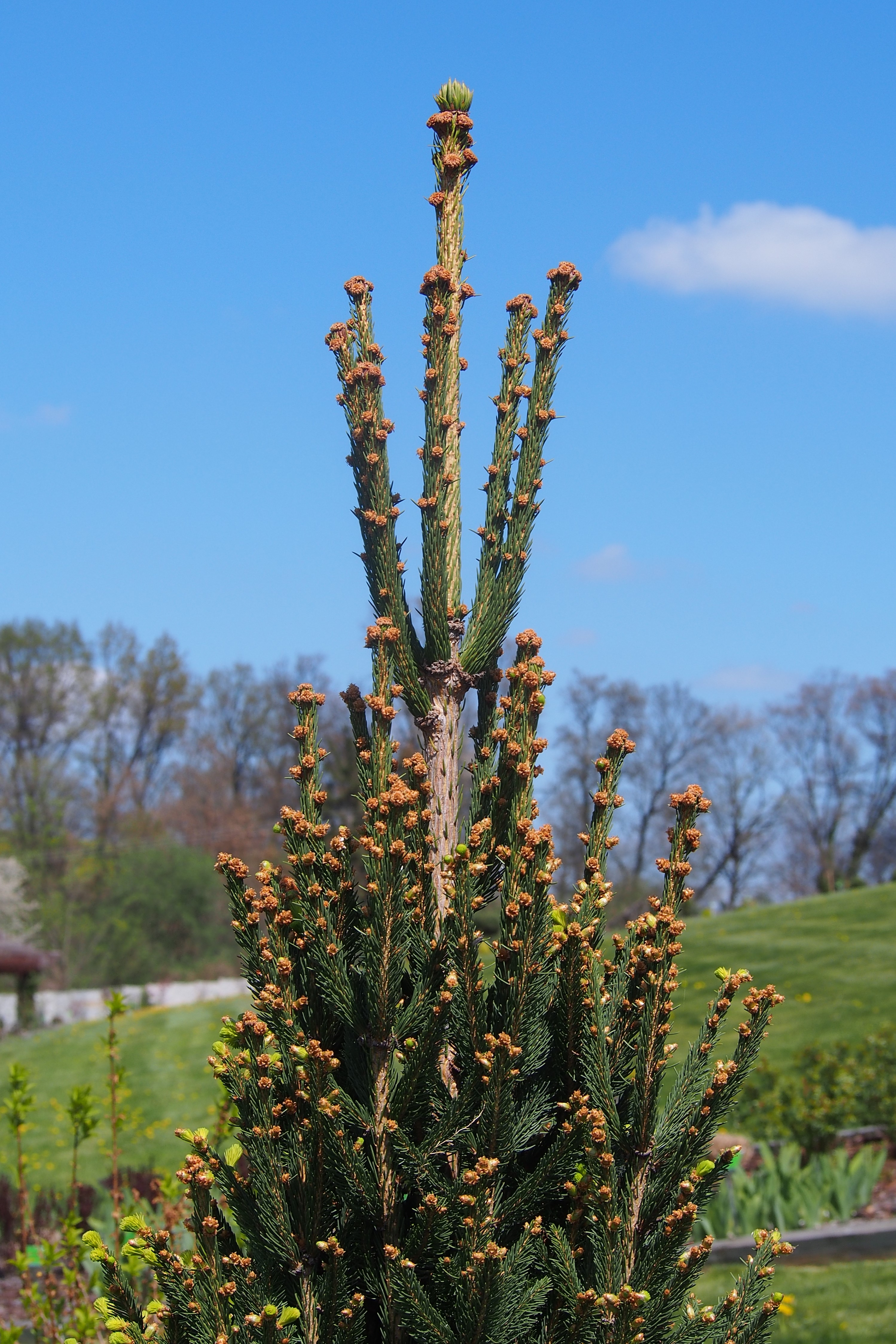
'Aleksandra Fastigiata'

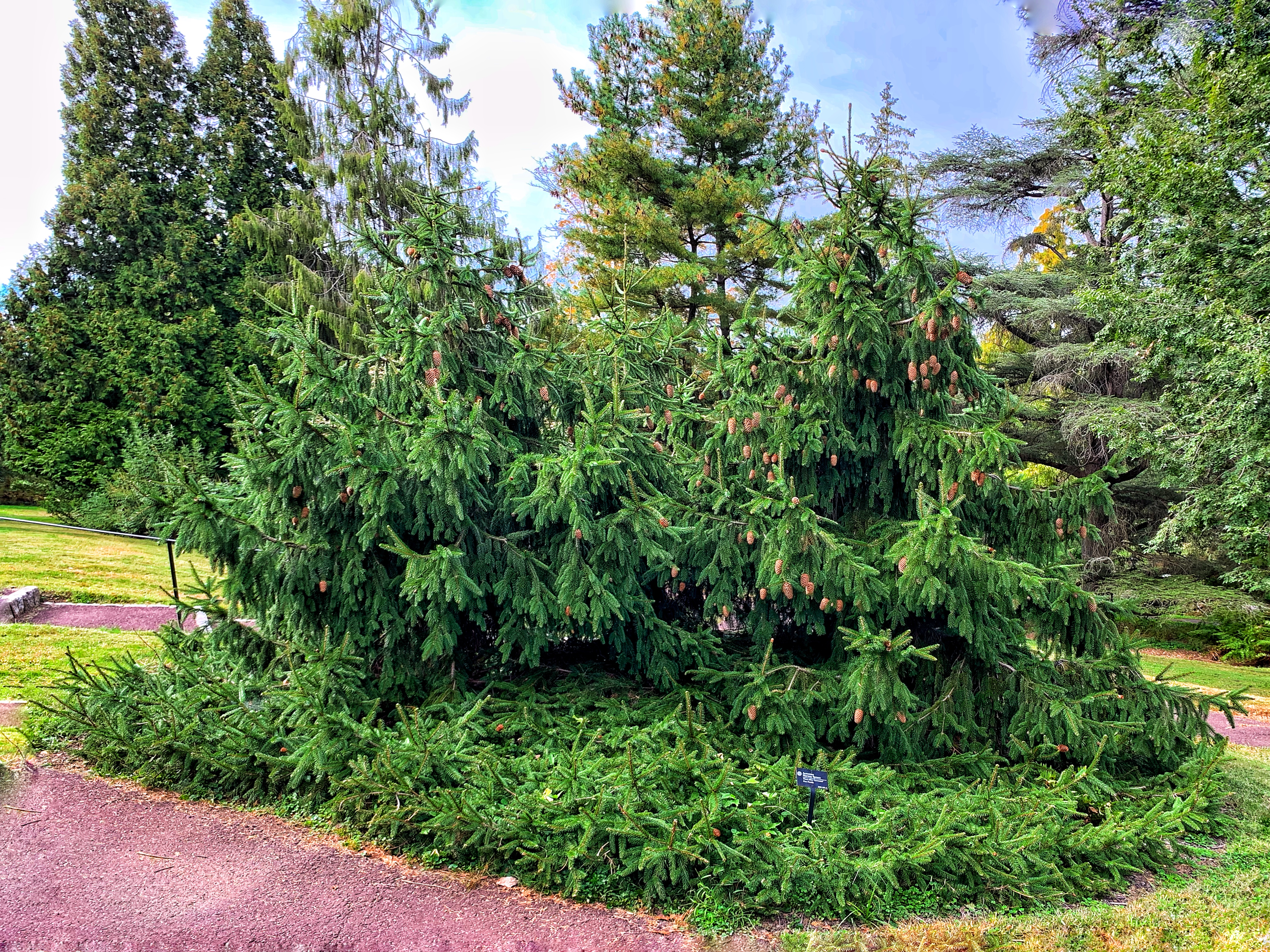
'Acrocona'

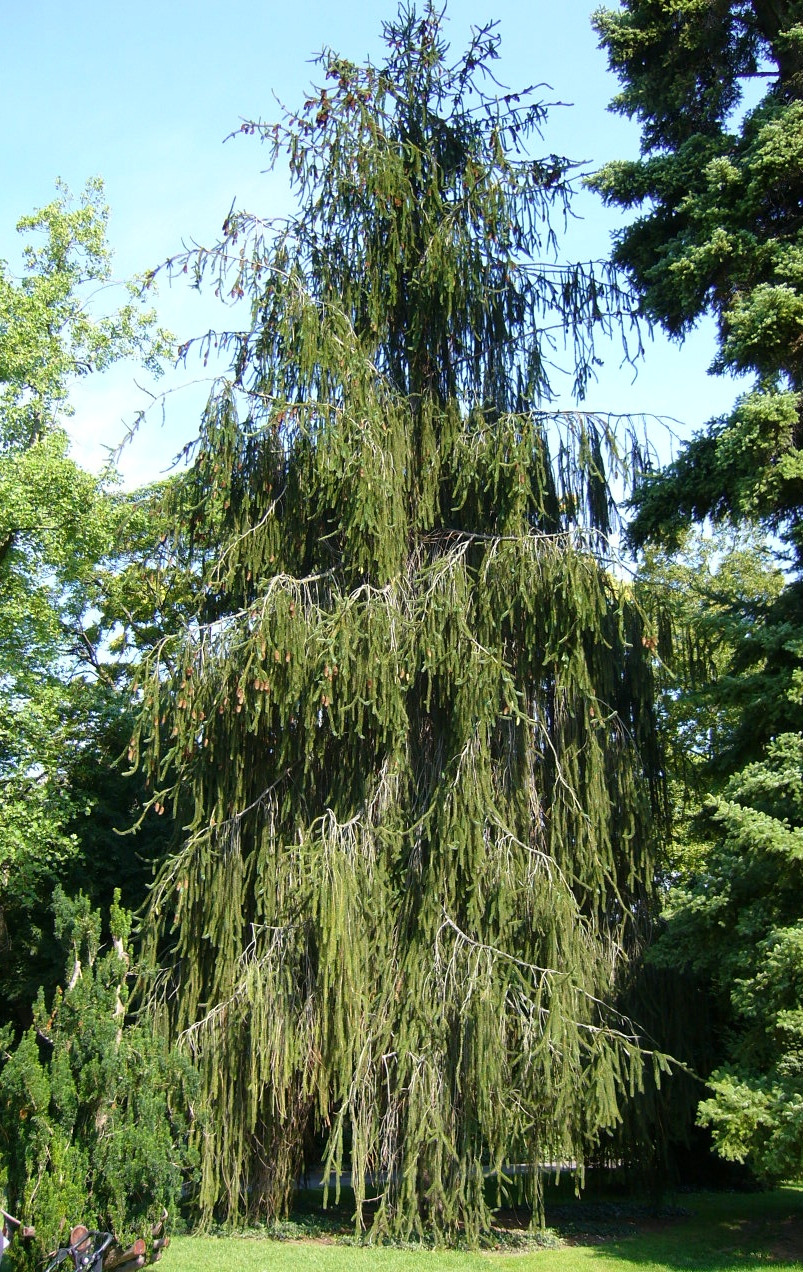
'Virgata'

== Uses ==
=== Timber ===
The Norway spruce is used in forestry for (softwood) timber, and for paper production.

Norway spruce timber

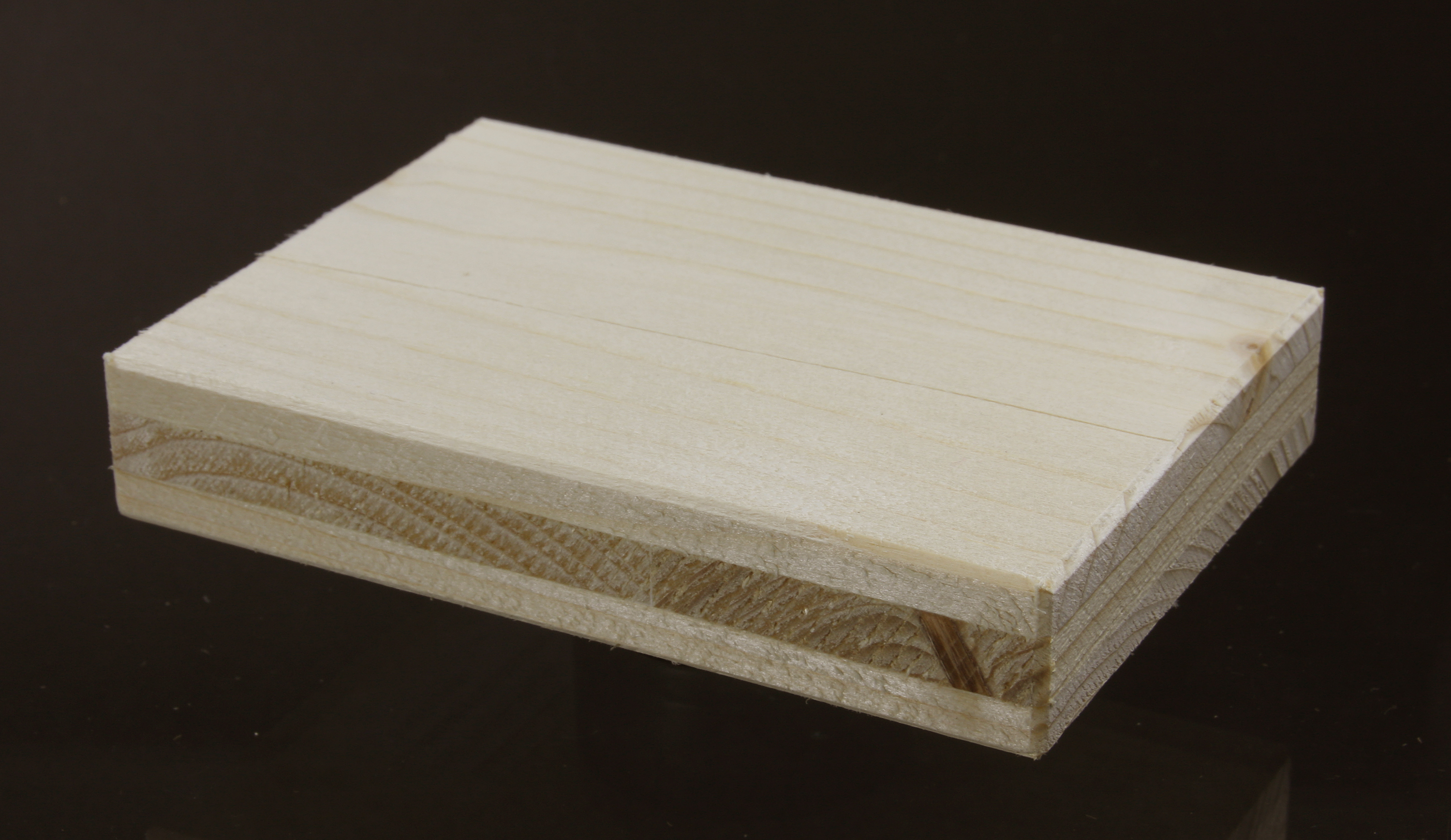
Laminated wood board (sample) of Norway spruce

Norway spruce frame for a warehouse building, Austria

Norway spruce is esteemed as a source of tonewood by stringed-instrument makers, and is commonly used for violins. One form of the tree called Haselfichte (Hazel-spruce) grows in the European Alps and has been recognised by UNESCO as intangible cultural heritage. This form was used by Stradivarius for instruments.

=== Christmas trees ===
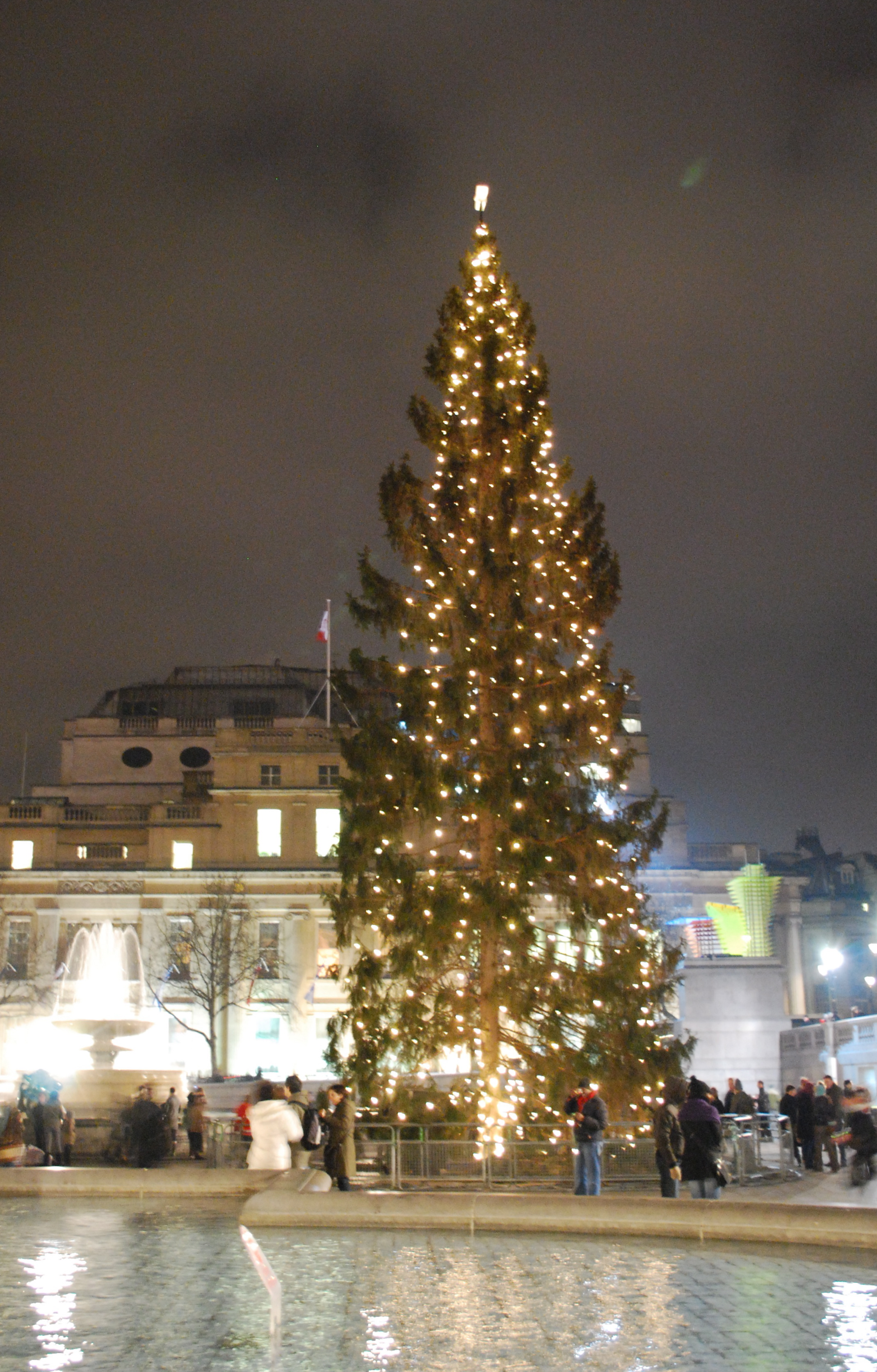
The Trafalgar Square Christmas tree in 2008. Given to London every year as a gift from Norway's capital city, Oslo, Norway, the spruces are usually 50 to 60 years old.

Norway spruce is used as an ornamental tree in parks and gardens, and is widely planted for use as Christmas trees. Every year the Norwegian capital city, Oslo, provides the cities of London (the Trafalgar Square Christmas tree), Edinburgh, Washington, D.C., and formerly also Reykjavik, with a large Norway spruce for the central square of each city, mainly in gratitude for the aid these countries gave during the Second World War.

=== Food ===
Norway spruce shoot tips have been used in traditional Austrian and Finnish medicine internally (as syrup or tea) and externally (as baths, for inhalation, as ointments, as resin application or as tea) for treatment of disorders of the respiratory tract, skin, locomotor system, gastrointestinal tract and infections.

During the production of Mont d'Or cheese it is wrapped in a "sangle" made from the cambium of a Norway spruce for about two weeks at least, which gives the cheese a unique flavour.

The Norwegian company Borregaard produces the synthetic vanilla substitute vanillin using the tree's wood. The company claims the product is preferred by their customers for its much lower carbon footprint than petrochemically-synthesised vanillin.

In Finland, Norway spruce tips (Finnish: kuusenkerkkä) are used as a spice, for example, in syrup, herbal tea, alcohol, smoothies, salt, and desserts. Spruce tip syrup is also used as a cold medicine.

=== Folk medicine ===
The resin has been used in Nordic folk medicine for treating wounds and skin disorders.

== Longevity ==
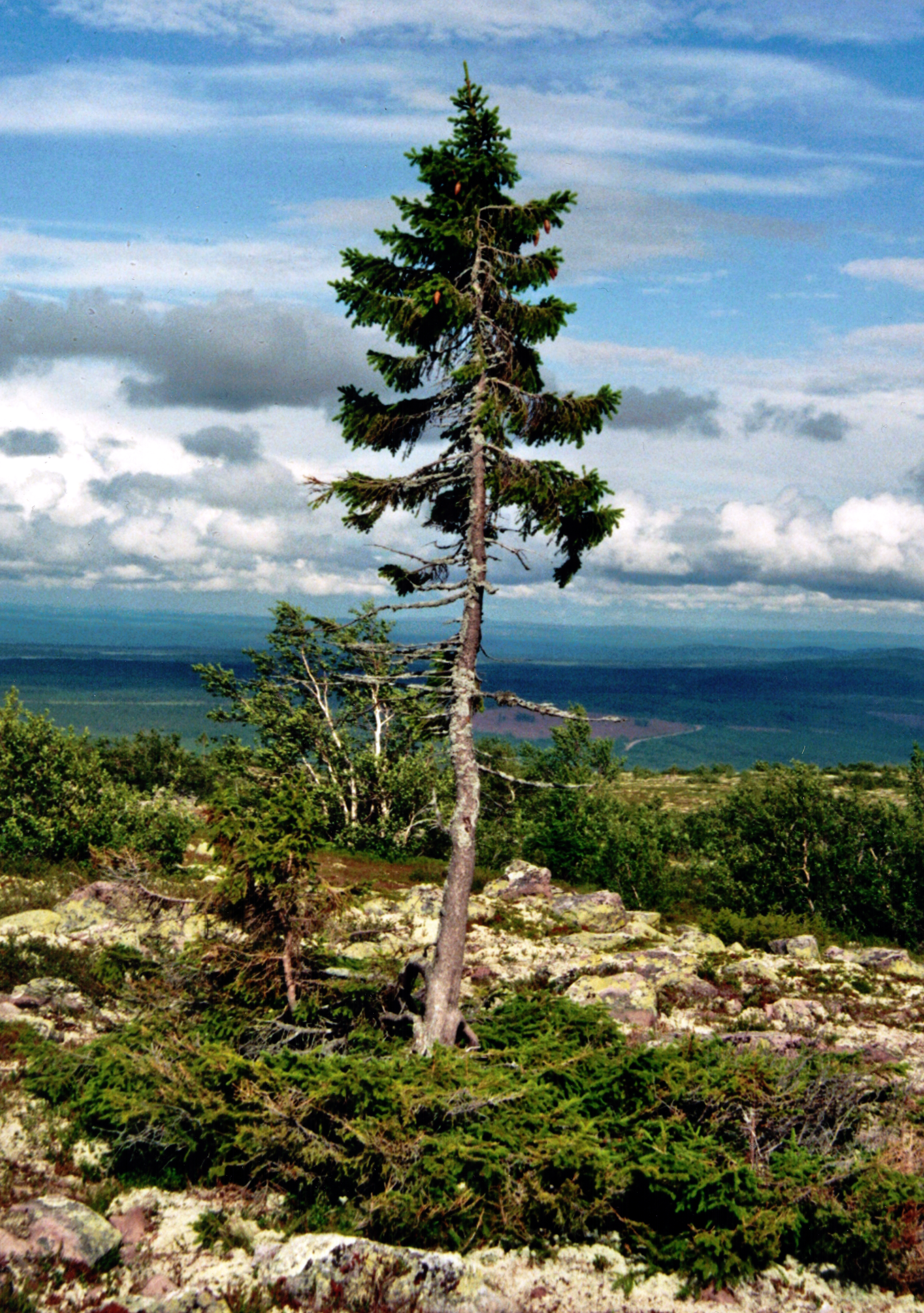
Old Tjikko has been claimed as the "oldest living tree", but this depends on definitions of individuality when clones grow from a root system.

A press release from Umeå University says that a Norway spruce clone named Old Tjikko, carbon dated as 9,550 years old, is the "oldest living tree". The oldest individual specimen of Norway spruce discovered by tree ring dating found in 2012 in a nature reserve of Buskerud County, Norway, was found to be 532 years old. However, Pando, a stand of 47,000 quaking aspen stems in a single clone, is estimated to be as much as 14,000 years old.

The stress is on the difference between the singular "oldest tree" and the multiple "oldest trees", and between "oldest clone" and "oldest non-clone". Old Tjikko is one of a series of genetically identical clones growing from a root system, one part of which is estimated to be 9,550 years old based on carbon dating. The oldest known individual tree (that has not taken advantage of vegetative cloning) is a Great Basin bristlecone pine over 5,000 years old (germination in 3051 BC).

== Genetics ==
The genome of Picea abies was sequenced in 2013, the first gymnosperm genome to be completely sequenced. The genome contains approximately 20 billion base pairs and is about six times the size of the human genome, despite possessing a similar number of genes. A large proportion of the spruce genome consists of repetitive DNA sequences, including long terminal repeat transposable elements. Despite recent advances in massively parallel DNA sequencing, the assembly of such a large and repetitive genome is a particularly challenging task, mainly from a computational perspective.

Within populations of Picea abies there is great genetic variability, which most likely reflect populations' isolation in glacial refugia and post-glacial evolutionary history. Genetic diversity can in particular be detected when looking at how the populations respond to climatic conditions. E.g. variations in timing and length of the annual growth period as well as differences in frost-hardiness in spring and autumn. These annual growth patterns are important to recognise in order to choose the proper reforestation material of Picea abies.

== Chemistry ==
p-Hydroxybenzoic acid glucoside, picein, piceatannol and its glucoside (astringin), isorhapontin (the isorhapontigenin glucoside), catechin and ferulic acid are phenolic compounds found in mycorrhizal and non-mycorrhizal roots of Norway spruces. Other compounds found in the species include piceol and astringin. Extracts have shown inhibitory activity on porcine pancreatic lipase in vitro.

== Synonyms ==
Picea abies (L.) H.Karst is the accepted name of this species. More than 150 synonyms of Picea abies have been published.

Homotypic synonyms of Picea abies are:

- Pinus abies L.
- Abies picea Mill.
- Pinus pyramidalis Salisb.
- Pinus abies subsp. vulgaris Voss
- Abies abies (L.) Druce

Some heterotypic synonyms of Picea abies are:

- Abies alpestris Brügger
- Abies carpatica (Loudon) Ravenscr.
- Abies cinerea Borkh.
- Abies clambrasiliana Lavallée
- Abies clanbrassiliana P. Lawson
- Abies coerulescens K. Koch
- Abies conica Lavallée
- Abies elegans Sm. ex J.Knight
- Abies eremita K.Koch
- Abies erythrocarpa (Purk.) Nyman
- Abies excelsa (Lam.) Poir.
- Abies extrema Th.Fr.
- Abies finedonensis Gordon
- Abies gigantea Sm. ex Carrière
- Abies gregoryana H. Low. ex Gordon
- Abies inverta R. Sm. ex Gordon
- Abies lemoniana Booth ex Gordon
- Abies medioxima C.Lawson
- Abies minuta Poir.
- Abies montana Nyman
- Abies parvula Knight
- Abies subarctica (Schur) Nyman
- Abies viminalis Wahlenb.
- Picea alpestris (Brügger) Stein
- Picea cranstonii Beissn.
- Picea elegantissima Beissn.
- Picea excelsa (Lam.) Link
- Picea finedonensis Beissn.
- Picea gregoryana Beissn.
- Picea integrisquamis (Carrière) Chiov.
- Picea maxwellii Beissn.
- Picea montana Schur
- Picea remontii Beissn.
- Picea rubra A. Dietr.
- Picea subarctica Schur
- Picea velebitica Simonk. ex Kümmerle
- Picea viminalis (Alstr.) Beissn.
- Picea vulgaris Link
- Pinus excelsa Lam.
- Pinus sativa Lam.
- Pinus viminalis Alstr.

Almost universally known in English as Norway spruce, the names common spruce and European spruce are also recorded.

== See also ==
- Pinus resinosa Norway pine
