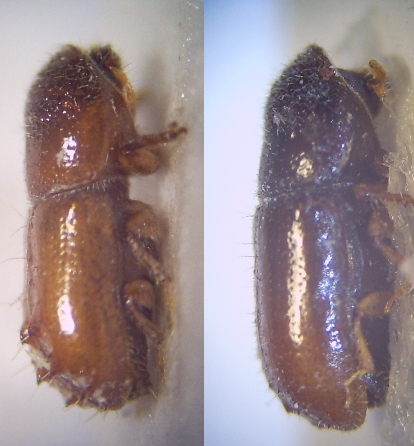
- Pityogenes chalcographus

Scientific classification
- Domain: Eukaryota
- Kingdom: Animalia
- Phylum: Arthropoda
- Class: Insecta
- Order: Coleoptera
- Suborder: Polyphaga
- Infraorder: Cucujiformia
- Family: Curculionidae
- Subfamily: Scolytinae
- Tribe: Scolytini
- Genus: Pityogenes; Bedel, 1888

= Pityogenes =

Genus of beetles

Pityogenes is a genus of typical bark beetles in the family Curculionidae. There are more than 30 described species in Pityogenes.

== Species ==
These 39 species belong to the genus Pityogenes:

- Pityogenes aizawai Kono, 1938b
- Pityogenes albanicus Apfelbeck, 1896
- Pityogenes baicalicus Eggers
- Pityogenes bialowiezensis Karpinski, 1931
- Pityogenes bidentatus Wood & Bright, 1992 (two-toothed pine beetle)
- Pityogenes bistridentatus Wood & Bright, 1992
- Pityogenes calcaratus Eichhoff, 1878
- Pityogenes carinulatus Wood & Bright, 1992
- Pityogenes carniolica Fuchs, 1911a
- Pityogenes chalcographus (Linnaeus & C., 1760)
- Pityogenes conjunctus Reitter, 1887b
- Pityogenes fossifrons Wood & Bright, 1992
- Pityogenes foveolatus Eggers, 1926b
- Pityogenes herbellae Strohmeyer & H., 1929b
- Pityogenes hopkinsi Swaine, 1915 (chestnut-brown bark beetle)
- Pityogenes irkutensis Eggers
- Pityogenes japonicus Nobuchi, 1974
- Pityogenes knechteli Swaine, 1918
- Pityogenes lecontei Swaine & J.M., 1915a
- Pityogenes lepidus Wichmann & H.E., 1914c
- Pityogenes meridianus Blackman, 1921
- Pityogenes mexicanus Wood, 1980b
- Pityogenes monacensis Fuchs, 1911a
- Pityogenes niger Sokanovskii & B.V., 1960
- Pityogenes nitidus Eggers, 1941b
- Pityogenes obtusus Eggers
- Pityogenes opacifrons Reitter, 1913a
- Pityogenes pennidens Wood & Bright, 1992
- Pityogenes perfossus Beeson, 1961
- Pityogenes pilidens Reitter, 1894a
- Pityogenes plagiatus Bright, 1976d
- Pityogenes porifrons Eggers
- Pityogenes quadridens Hartig, 1834
- Pityogenes rudnevi Sokanovskii & B.V., 1959a
- Pityogenes saalasi Eggers, 1914
- Pityogenes scitus Blandford, 1893b
- Pityogenes seirindensis Murayama, 1929c
- Pityogenes spessivtsevi Lebedev, 1926
- Pityogenes trepanatus Wood & Bright, 1992
