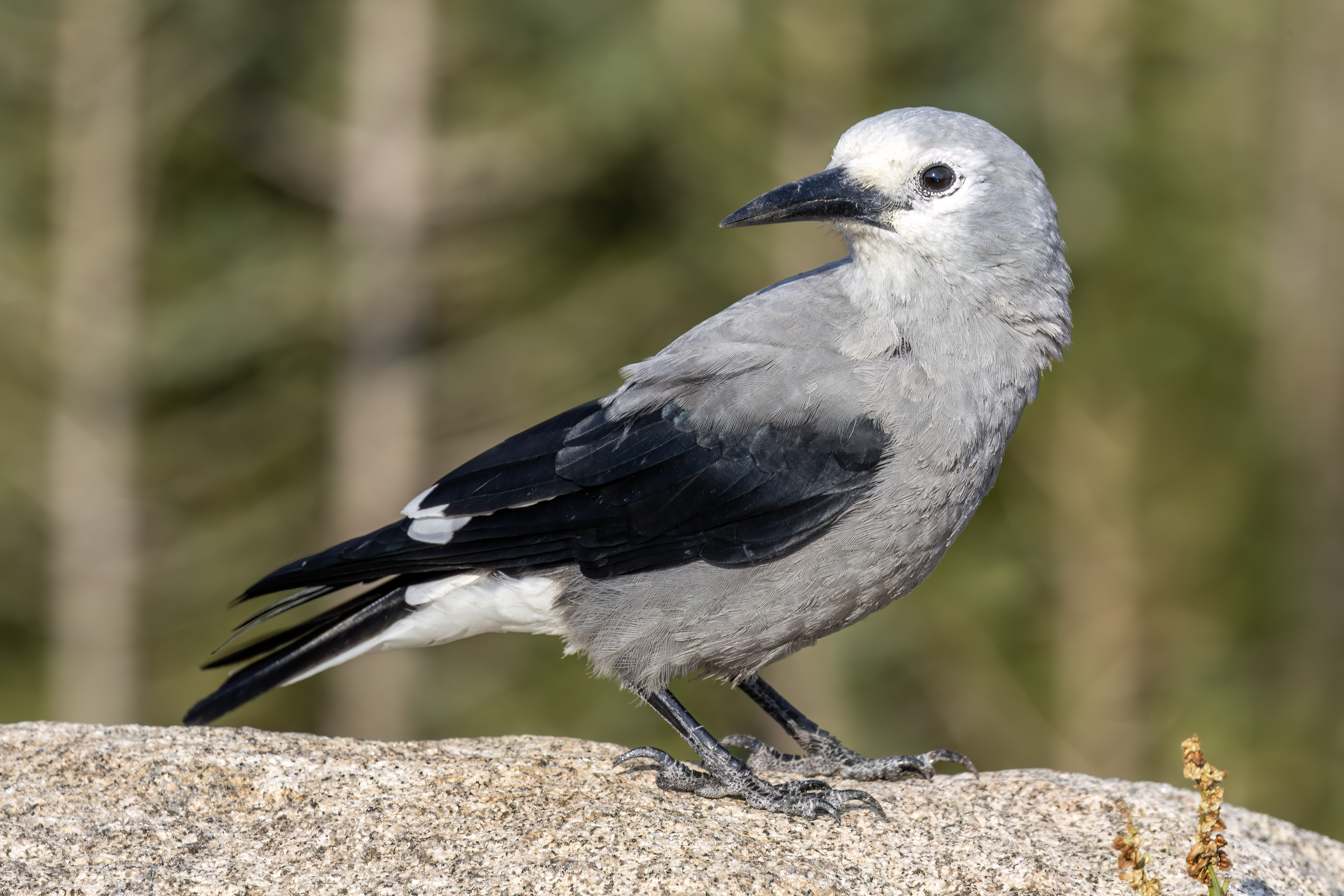

Conservation status
- Least Concern (IUCN 3.1)

Scientific classification
- Kingdom: Animalia
- Phylum: Chordata
- Class: Aves
- Order: Passeriformes
- Family: Corvidae
- Genus: Nucifraga
- Species: N. columbiana

Binomial name
- Nucifraga columbiana (Wilson, 1811)

Synonyms
- Corvus columbianus Wilson, 1811; Picicorvus columbianus Bonaparte, 1850

Audio
- Sounds

= Clark's nutcracker =

Species of bird

Clark's nutcracker (Nucifraga columbiana), also known as Clark's crow, is a passerine bird in the family Corvidae, native to the mountains of western North America. The nutcracker is an omnivore, but subsists mainly on pine nuts, burying seeds in the ground in the late summer and fall, and then retrieving them in the winter and spring by memory. The bird was described by the Lewis and Clark Expedition, with William Clark first observing it in 1805 along the banks of the Salmon River, a tributary of the Columbia River.

== Etymology and history ==
In William Clark's initial description of the bird, he mistakenly described it as a woodpecker, writing "I saw today [a] bird of the woodpecker kind, which fed on pine burrs. Its bill and tail white; the wings black; every other part of a light brown, and about the size of a robin."

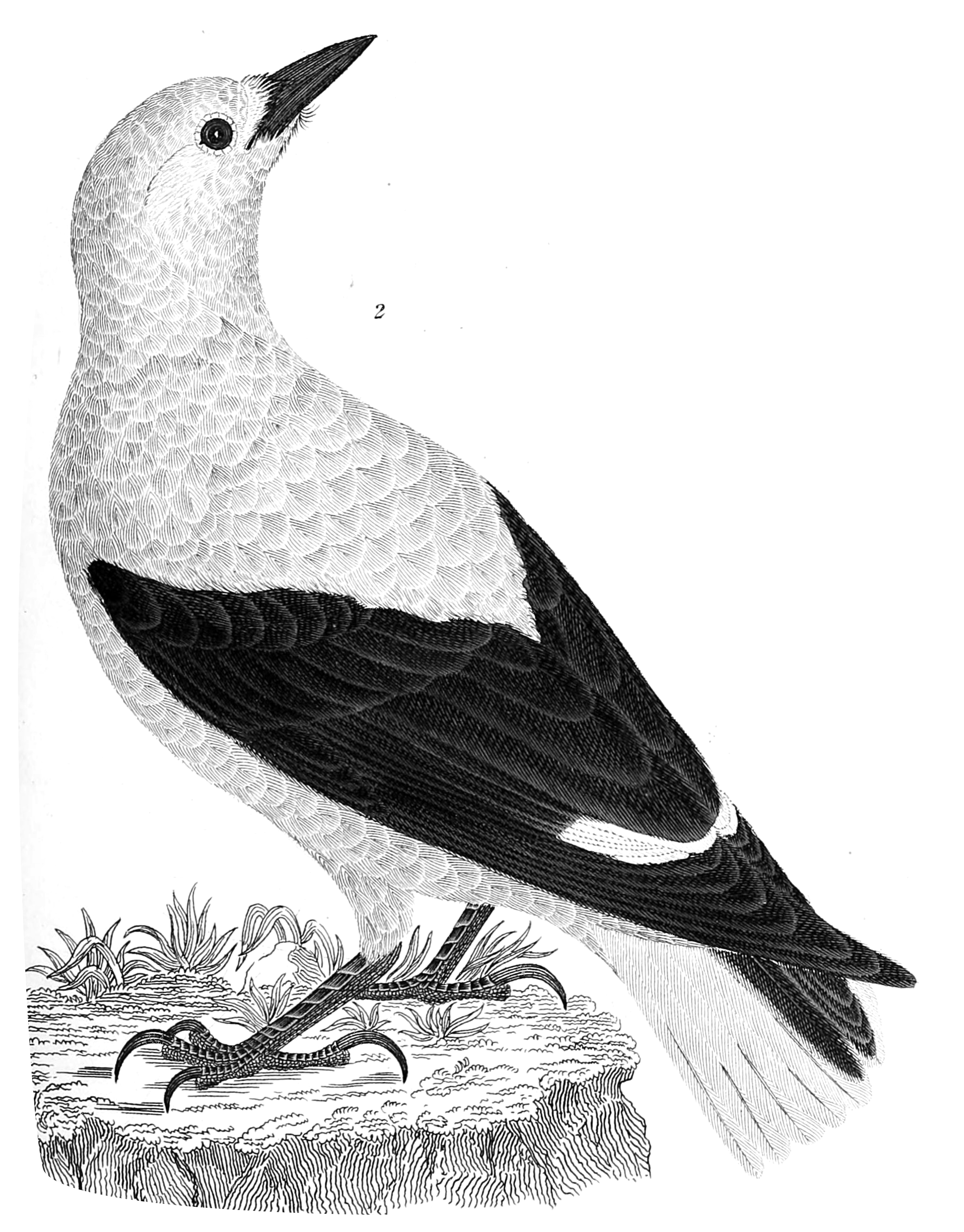
Original illustration of Clark's nutcracker by Alexander Wilson

Clark's nutcracker's scientific name literally means "nutcracker of the Columbia". In 1806, Meriwether Lewis recorded a more detailed description from specimens collected along the Clearwater River in Idaho. A skin collected by the expedition was obtained by the ornithologist Alexander Wilson, who used it to produce an engraving for his American Ornithology work.

== Taxonomy ==
Originally placed in the genus Corvus by Wilson, by 1840 Clark's nutcracker was included in Nucifraga by John James Audubon. Through the second half of the 19th century, taxonomists placed Clark's nutcracker in its own genus, Picicorvus, as suggested by Charles Lucien Bonaparte. In 1894, ornithologist Robert Ridgway suggested its return to Nucifraga, citing morphological similarities to its modern Eurasian congenerics.

== Distribution and habitat ==
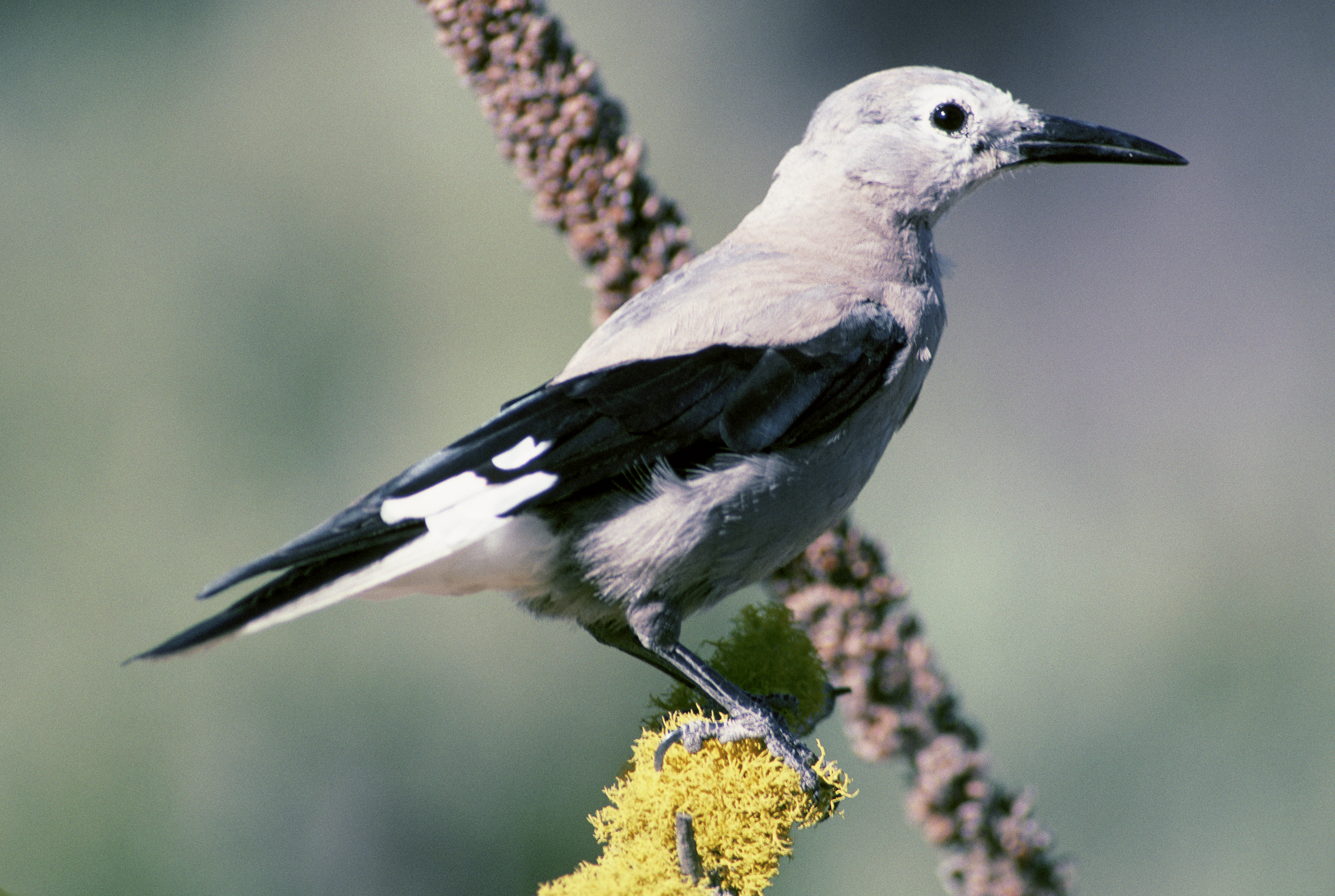
In Deschutes National Forest

This species is present in western North America from British Columbia and western Alberta in the north to Baja California and central New Mexico in the south. There is also a small isolated population on the peak of Cerro Potosí (elevation 3,700 m (12,100 ft)), in Nuevo León, northeast Mexico. It is mainly found in mountains at altitudes of 900–3,900 m (3,000–12,800 ft) in conifer forest. It is not typically migratory, but does seasonally move between higher elevations in the summer breeding season and lower elevations in the winter. Some populations of Clark's nutcracker will remain year-round at high elevations if they have sufficient food caches. In years where pine mast production is particularly poor, Clark's nutcracker may leave its normal range and travel as far north as Alaska, and east as the Great Plains. Vagrants have occurred as far east as Pennsylvania and Ontario.

== Description ==
Nucifraga columbiana is roughly the size of a jay, and slightly smaller than its Eurasian congenerics (northern, southern, and Kashmir nutcrackers). Its head, back, belly, and ventrum are covered in gray feathers, and it sports black wings with white tips on secondary feathers. Its tail feathers are easily distinguishable in flight, with central black feathers bordered by white feathers on either side. It has a long, black, pointed bill whose shape is specialized for removing the scales of pinecones.

=== Measurements ===
- Length: 27–30 cm (11–12 in)
- Weight: 106–161 g (3.7–5.7 oz)
- Wingspan: 60 cm (24 in)

== Food ==
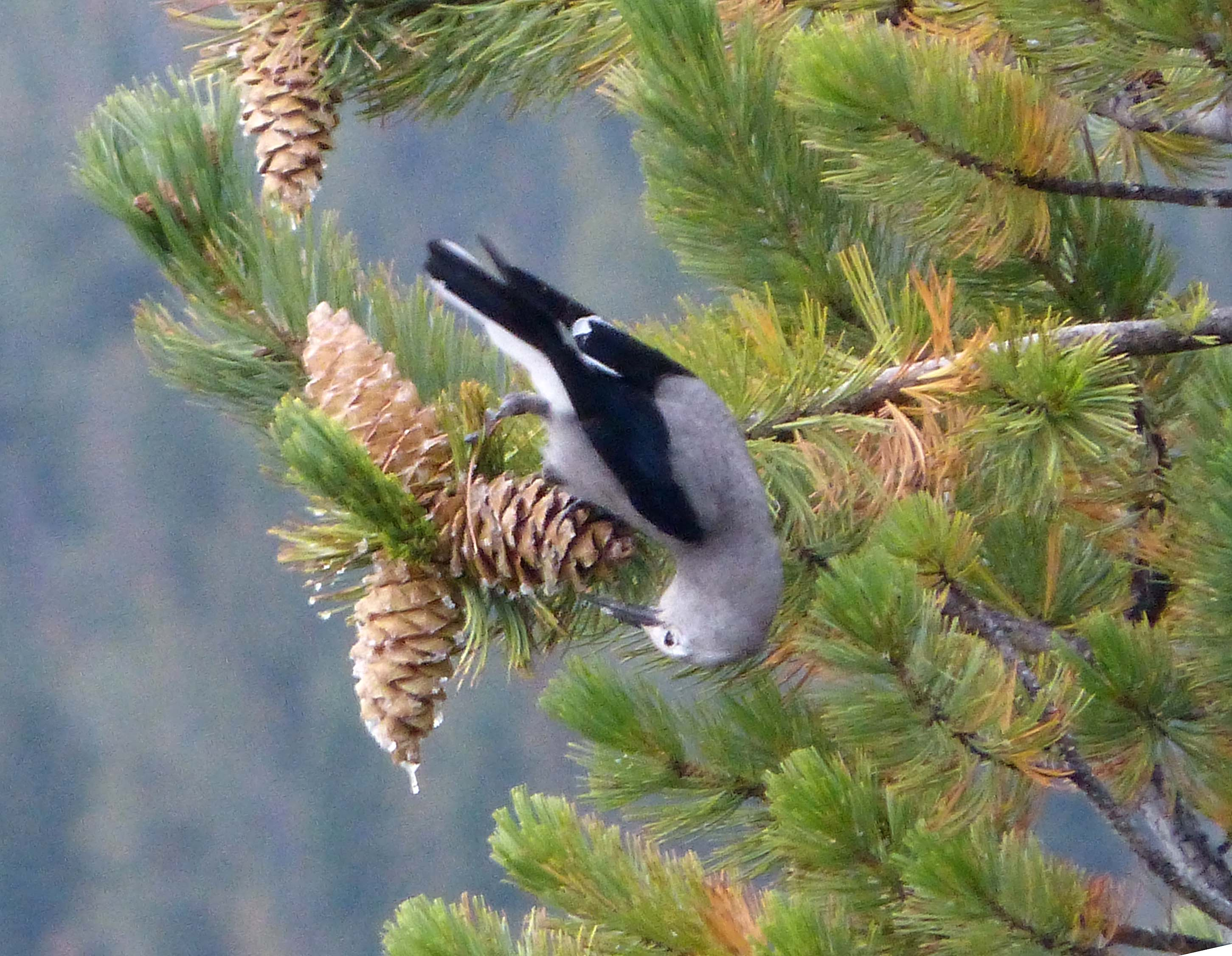
Clark's nutcracker feeding on seeds of pines

The most important food resources for this species are the seeds of pines (Pinus sp.), principally two cold-climate (high-altitude) species of white pine with large seeds: the whitebark pine (P. albicaulis) and limber pine (P. flexilis). Seeds of other high-altitude pine species are also eaten, including the foxtail pine (P. balfouriana), bristlecone pine (P. longaeva) western white pine (P. monticola), and ponderosa pine (P. ponderosa). Douglas fir (Pseudotsuga menziesii) is one of the few non-pine conifers whose seeds Clark's nutcracker regularly eats. During migrations to lower altitudes, it also extensively uses the seeds of pinyon pines. The isolated Cerro Potosí population is strongly associated with the local endemic Potosi pinyon (Pinus culminicola). All Clark's nutcrackers have a sublingual pouch capable of holding around 50–150 seeds, depending on the size of the seeds, which helps the birds more easily transport seeds between caches.

Clark's nutcrackers store seeds, usually in the ground for later consumption, in caches of 1–15 seeds (average of 3–4 seeds). They favor cache sites on steep, south-facing mountain slopes, as snow will melt here earliest in the year. Depending on the cone crop as well as the tree species, a single Clark's nutcracker can cache as many as 98,000 seeds per season. The birds regularly store more than they actually need as insurance against seed theft by other animals (squirrels, etc.), as well as low availability of alternative foods; this surplus seed is left in the cache, and may be able to germinate and grow into new trees. This storage behavior allows demonstration of the bird's long-term spatial memory; they are able to relocate caches of seeds with great accuracy up to nine months after initial storage. Clark's nutcrackers are heavily dependent on food retrieved from caches throughout the winter, and will dig up caches, even when buried under heavy snow. Short-term pictoral memory tasks reveal that while nutcrackers have particularly adept spatial memories, their visual memory is unremarkable; the cognitive ability they use to recover caches appears to be specifically evolved for this purpose.

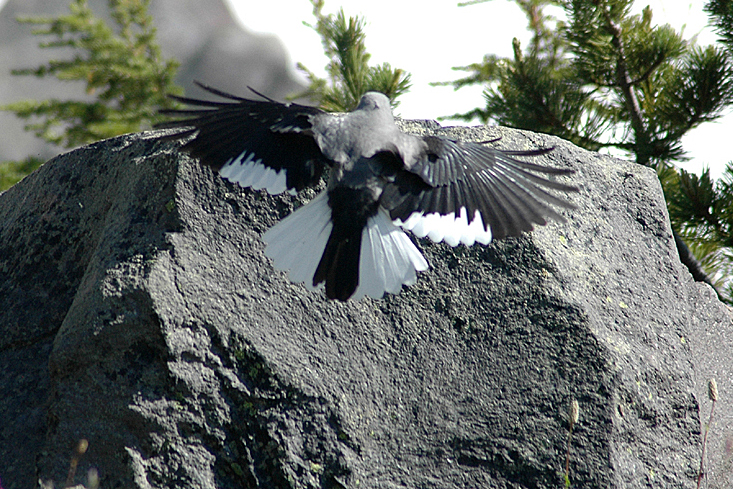
Clark's nutcracker landing, Mount Hood, Oregon

Clark's nutcrackers, like other Corvids, are opportunistic feeders whose diet also includes a wide range of insect prey, rodents, nestling birds and eggs, amphibians, and carrion. In rare cases, they may attack and eat adult birds. In backyard bird feeders, they will take peanuts and suet. Clark's nutcrackers will also eat unattended human food in developed areas, and are known to some as "camp robbers".

== Nesting ==
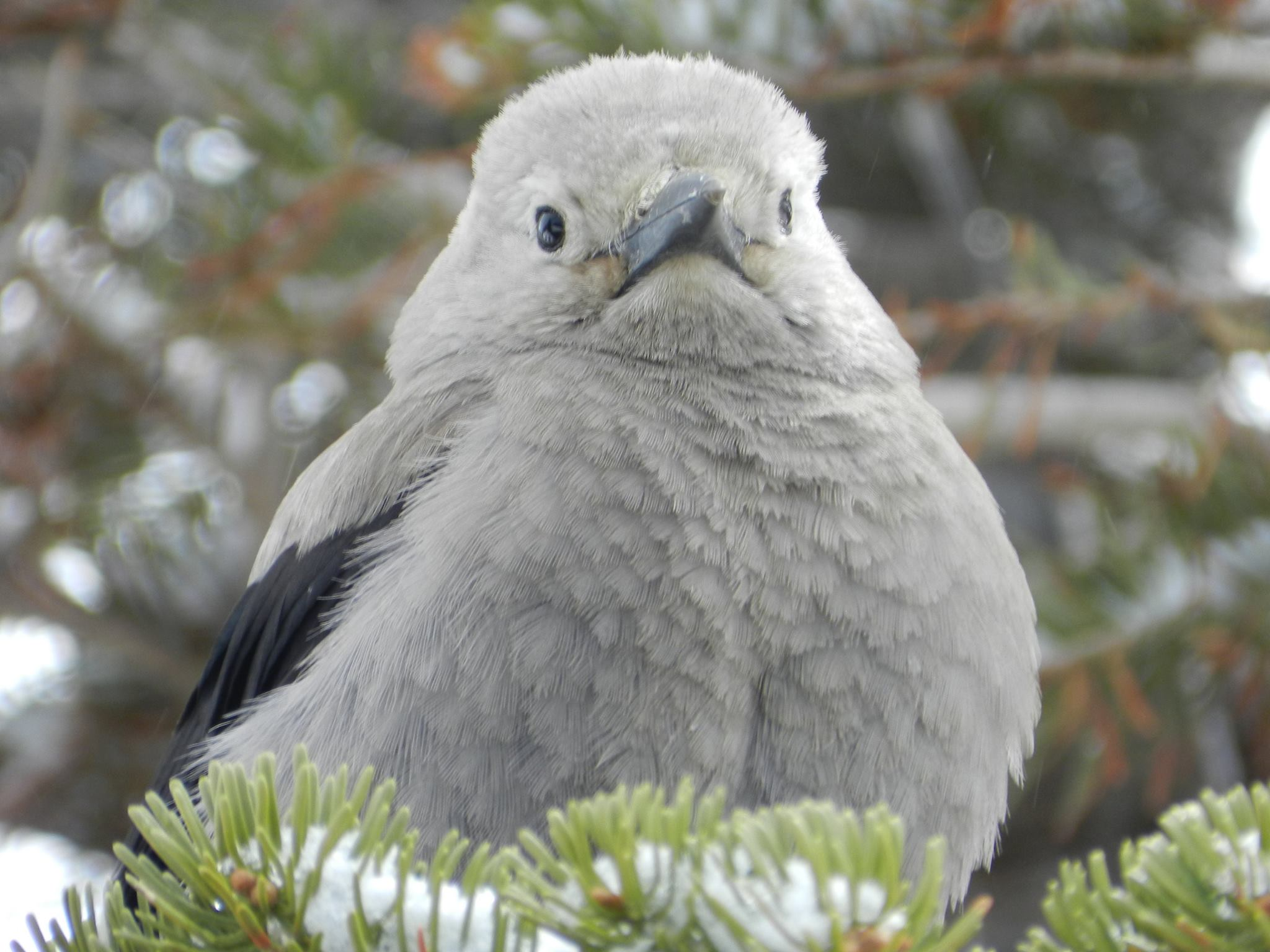
A Clark's nutcracker nestled on a branch at Crater Lake National Park in Oregon.

The species usually nests in pines or other types of conifers during early spring. Two to six eggs are laid per nest, with incubation occurring over approximately 18 days. Incubation is performed by both the male and female parents, and both the male and the female develop brood patches; however, the female parent contributes significantly more time to incubation than the male. Nestlings fledge between 3–4 weeks after hatch.

== Whitebark pine mutualism ==
Clark's nutcracker is the primary seed disperser for whitebark pine (Pinus albicaulis). Whitebark pine is in decline throughout its range, due to infection by white pine blister rust (Cronartium ribicola), widespread outbreaks of mountain pine beetle, and the long-term effects of fire suppression. Clark's nutcracker is an integral part of the whitebark pine restoration process: Clark's nutcracker must remain in whitebark pine forests and cache the seeds in excess, so that healthy trees will continue to grow. If whitebark pine declines into extinction, Clark's nutcracker will lose an important source of food and may no longer be seen in areas where the tree is the primary source of seed, such as Glacier National Park.

== Vocalization ==
Corvids, of which Clark's nutcracker is a member, do not typically have songs. However, they produce between eight and thirteen variable calls, generally phonetically described as "kraak" or "kraa". Additional clicking or crackling calls are made, likely used for pair bonding.
