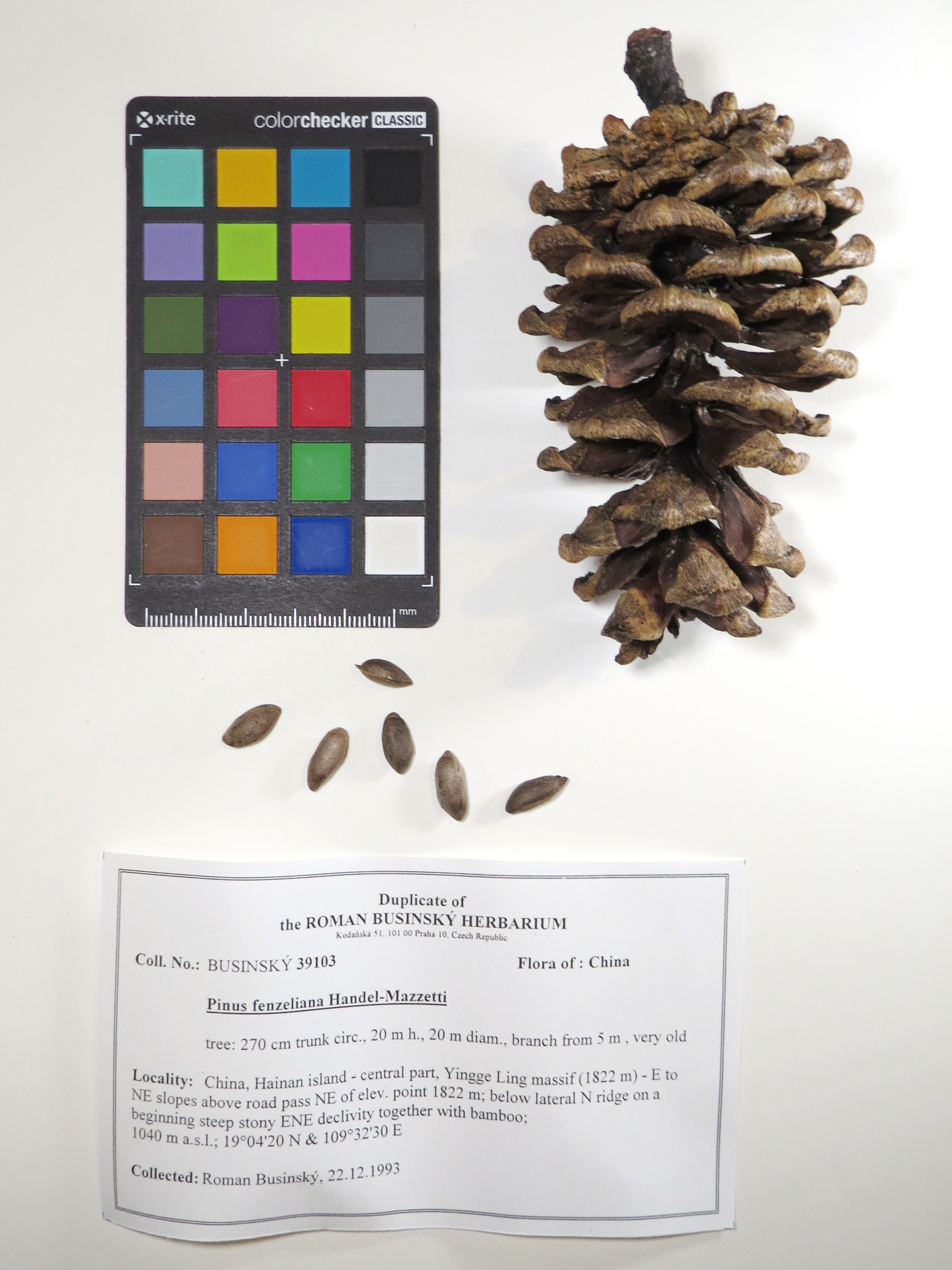

Conservation status
- Near Threatened (IUCN 3.1)

Scientific classification
- Kingdom: Plantae
- Clade: Tracheophytes
- Clade: Gymnospermae
- Division: Pinophyta
- Class: Pinopsida
- Order: Pinales
- Family: Pinaceae
- Genus: Pinus
- Subgenus: P. subg. Strobus
- Section: P. sect. Quinquefoliae
- Subsection: P. subsect. Strobus
- Species: P. fenzeliana

Binomial name
- Pinus fenzeliana Hand.-Mazz.

= Pinus fenzeliana =

Hainan white pine

Species of conifer

Pinus fenzeliana commonly known as the Hainan white pine or Fenzel's pine, is a tree endemic to the island of Hainan off southern China. This pine reaches heights of 20 m with a trunk 1 m in diameter.

== Description ==
The leaves are needle-like, in fascicles of five, and 5–13 cm long. The seed cones are 6–11 cm long, with thick, woody scales; the seeds are large, about 8–15 mm long, with a vestigial 3 mm wing, similar to the related Chinese white pine (Pinus armandii). Hainan white pine differs from that species in the shorter needles, smaller cones, and in being adapted to a subtropical rainforest habitat.

A pine from the Dabie Mountains in Anhui, eastern China, first described as a species Pinus dabeshanensis, is occasionally treated as a variety of this species, but more commonly as a variety of P. armandii, which it more closely resembles.

Reports of Pinus fenzeliana from Vietnam have not been verified; trees in this area have proved to be either Vietnamese white pine (Pinus dalatensis) or Guangdong white pine (Pinus wangii), which both differ markedly in cone and seed size and shape, though similar in foliage.
