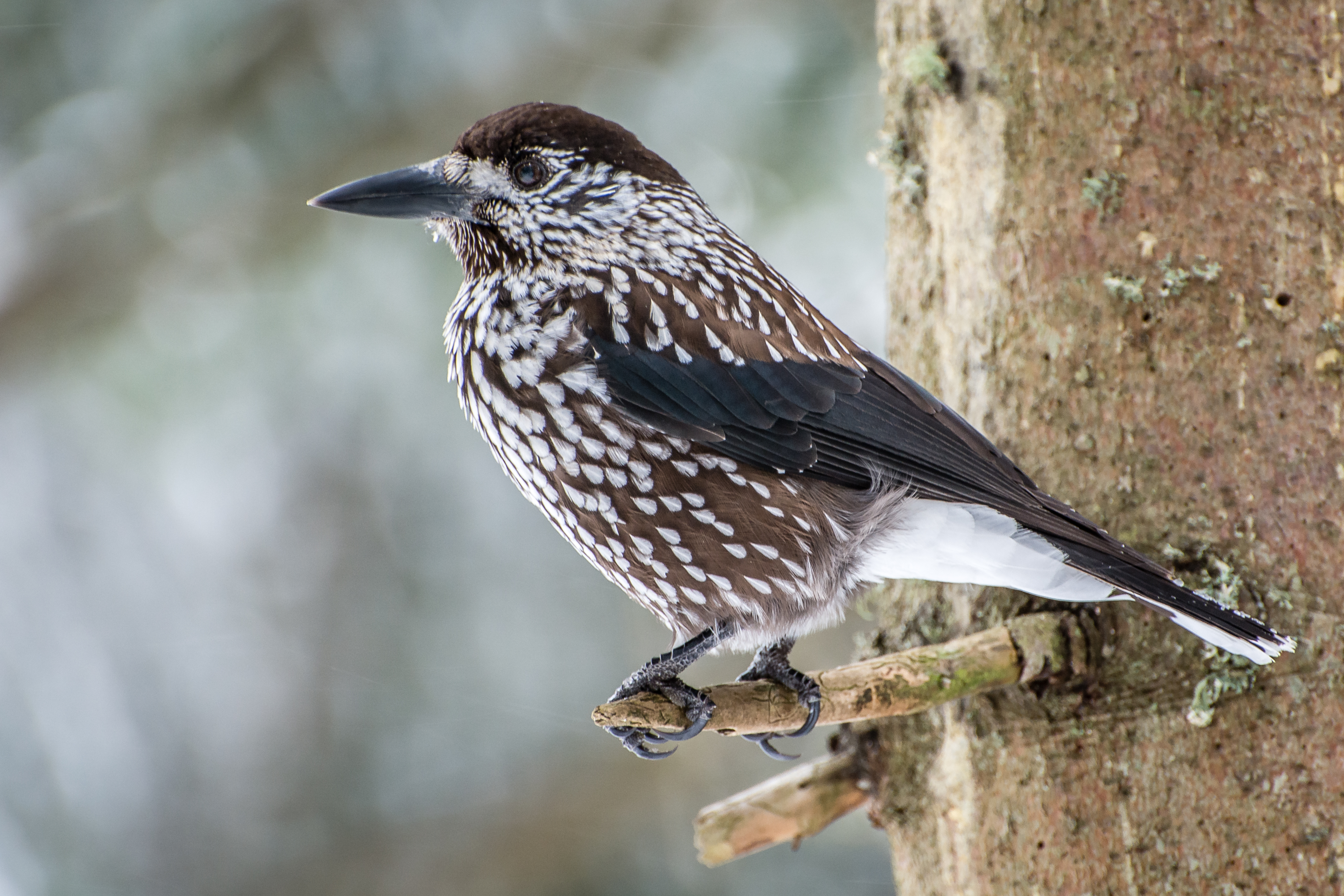
- Nucifraga caryocatactes caryocatactes near Lake Davos

Conservation status
- Least Concern (IUCN 3.1)

Scientific classification
- Kingdom: Animalia
- Phylum: Chordata
- Class: Aves
- Order: Passeriformes
- Family: Corvidae
- Genus: Nucifraga
- Species: N. caryocatactes

Binomial name
- Nucifraga caryocatactes (Linnaeus, 1758)
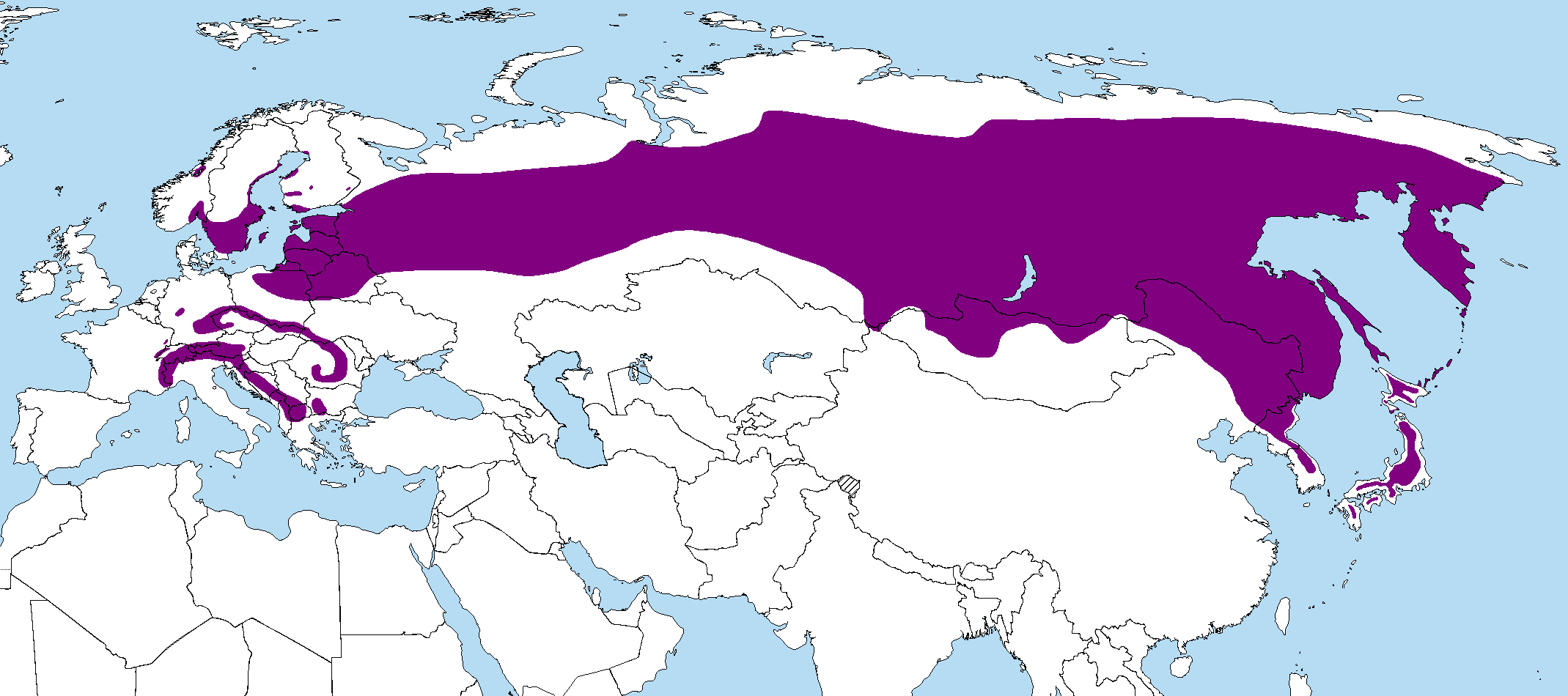

Synonyms
- Corvus caryocatactes Linnaeus, 1758

Audio
- Calls in Savoie, French Alps

= Northern nutcracker =

Species of bird

The northern nutcracker (Nucifraga caryocatactes), previously known as the spotted nutcracker and Eurasian nutcracker, is a passerine bird in the crow family Corvidae. It is slightly smaller than the Eurasian jay but has a much larger bill and a slimmer looking head without any crest. The feathering over its body is predominantly chocolate brown with distinct white spots and patches. The wings and upper tail are black with a greenish-blue gloss.

The northern nutcracker is one of four species of nutcracker currently accepted. The southern nutcracker (Nucifraga hemispila) and the Kashmir nutcracker (Nucifraga multipunctata) were formerly considered as subspecies of the northern nutcracker. The species complex was known by the English name "spotted nutcracker". The fourth and most distinct member of the genus, Clark's nutcracker (Nucifraga columbiana), occurs in western North America.

== Taxonomy ==
The northern nutcracker was one of many species originally described by Carl Linnaeus in his landmark 1758 10th edition of Systema Naturae, where it was given the binomial name Corvus caryocatactes. It was later assigned to the genus Nucifraga that was erected by Mathurin Jacques Brisson in 1760. The scientific name is a reduplication; nucifraga is a Neo-Latin translation of German Nussbrecher, "nut-breaker" based on Latin nucis "nut", and frangere "to shatter", and caryocatactes based on Greek: karuon "nut", and kataseio "to shatter". The common English name nutcracker first appears in 1693 in a translation of a German travel guide, where it is a calque on the German name Nußknacker, as the bird was not recorded in Britain until 1753. Other Germanic languages have etymologically related names: Danish: nøddekrige; Dutch: notenkraker; Norwegian: nøttekråke; Swedish: nötkråka.

=== Subspecies ===
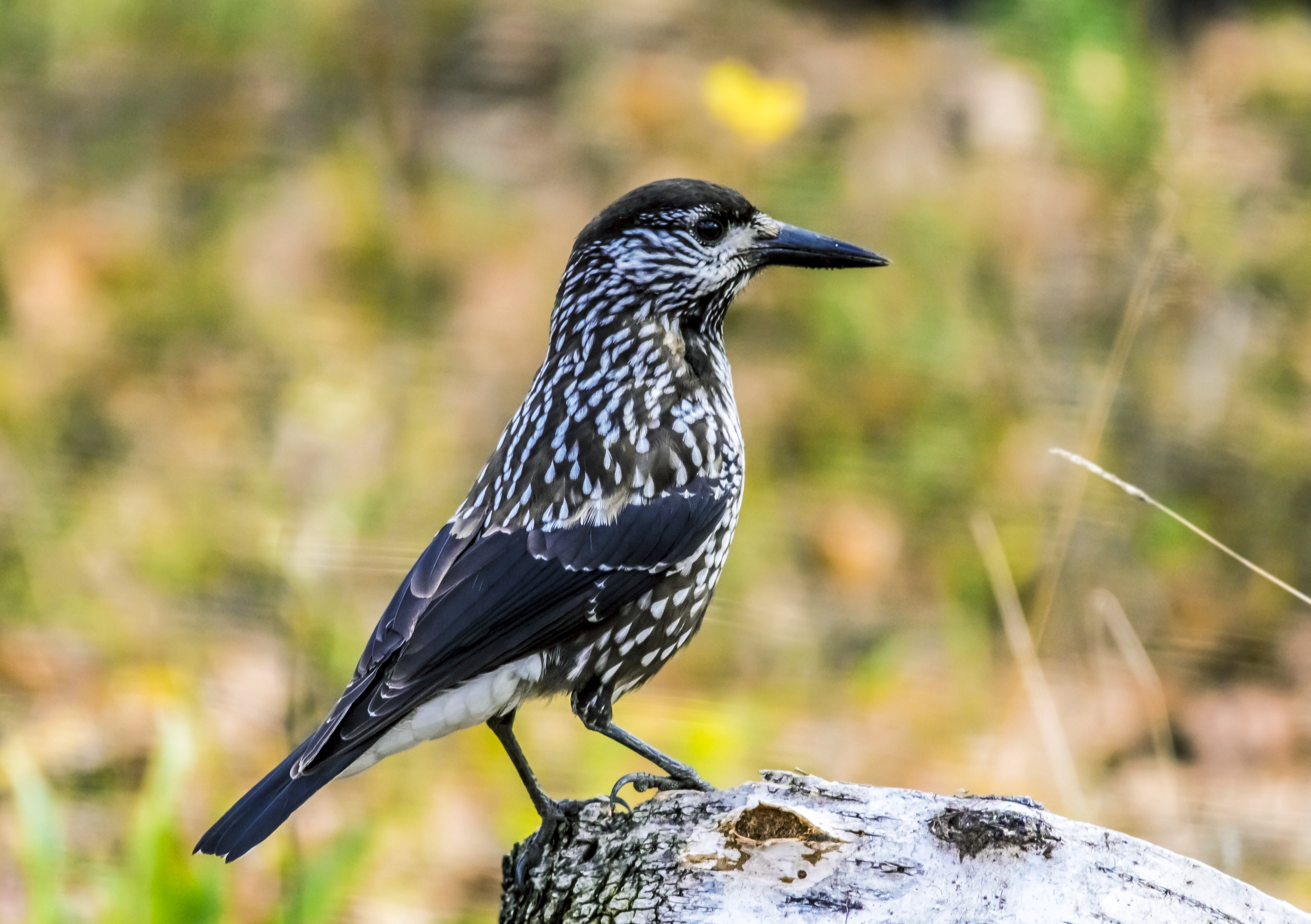
N. c. macrorhynchos in Russia

Four subspecies are accepted:

- N. c. caryocatactes (Linnaeus, 1758) – Europe
- N. c. macrorhynchos C. L. Brehm, 1823 – Ural Mts. to east Siberia and northeast China
- N. c. rothschildi E. J. O. Hartert, 1903 – Kazakhstan to northwest China
- N. c. japonica E. J. O. Hartert, 1897 – Kuril Islands and north Japan

== Description ==
Northern nutcracker ranges from 32 to 38 cm (13 to 15 in) in length (from tip of beak to tip of tail) and has a wingspan ranging from 49 to 53 cm (19 to 21 in). It is a dark brown, broad-winged, short-tailed corvid. Body plumage is mid-to-dark chocolate brown, heavily spotted with white on face, neck, mantle and underparts. It has a large white loral spot, a white eye-ring, blackish-brown cap extending onto the nape, dark blackish wings with a greenish-blue gloss, all white vent, and dark tail with white corners above and a white terminal band on the undertail. In flight, broad wings, white vent and short tail are noticeable; the flight undulating. The black bill is slender to stout and rather long, sharply pointed, and varies in size amongst races. The iris, legs and feet are black.

The voice is loud and harsh, somewhat similar to that of the Eurasian jay but slightly lower pitched and more on a single tone. It is described as kraak-kraak-kraak-kraak.

== Behaviour ==
=== Feeding ===
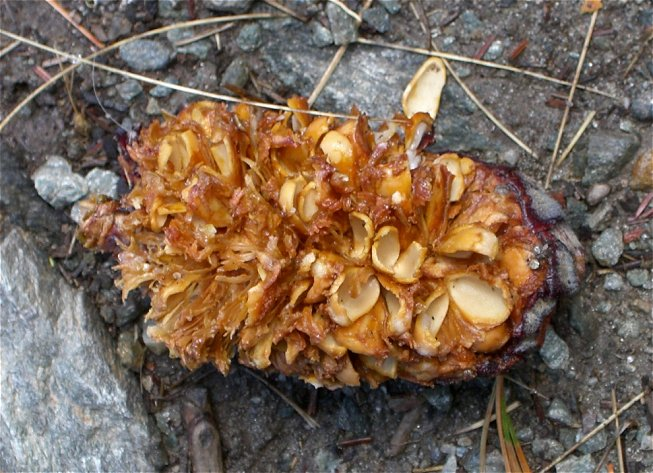
A Pinus cembra cone stripped of its scales and seeds by a foraging nutcracker

The most important food resources for this species are the seeds (pine nuts) of various pines (Pinus sp.), principally the cold-climate (far northern and high altitude) species of white pine (Pinus subgenus Strobus) with large seeds: Swiss pine (P. cembra), Korean pine (P. koraiensis), Japanese white pine (P. parviflora, Macedonian pine (P. peuce), Siberian dwarf pine (P. pumila), and Siberian pine (P. sibirica). In some regions, where none of these pines occur, the seeds of spruce (Picea sp.) and hazel nuts (Corylus sp.) form an important part of the diet too. The forms that take hazel nuts have thicker bills for cracking their hard shells, with a special ridge on the inside of the bill edge near the base. If the shell is too hard, it holds the nut between its feet and hacks at it with its bill like a chisel.

A special adaptation is found in the tongue of the nutcracker. The tip of the tongue forks with two long pointed appendages which are keratinised into nail like surfaces. This is thought to help them handle and shell conifer seeds.

Surplus seed is always stored for later use and it is this species that is responsible for the sowing of new trees of their favoured pines, including the re-establishment of the Swiss pine (Pinus cembra) over large areas in the Alps of central Europe where it had formerly been cleared by human overcutting.

Various insects are also taken, and also small birds, their eggs and nestlings, small rodents and carrion such as roadkill. It digs out bumble bee and wasp nests avidly to get at the grubs.

=== Breeding ===
Nutcracker pairs stay together for life and their territory expands between 20 and 30 hectares (49 and 74 acres). Nesting is always early in this species across its whole range, so as to make the best use of pine nuts stored the previous autumn. The nest is usually built high in a conifer (sometimes broadleaved trees are used) and usually on the sunny side. There are normally 2-4 eggs laid and incubated for 18 days. Both sexes feed the young which are usually fledged by about 23 days and stay with their parents for many months, following them to learn the food storage techniques essential for survival in their harsh environment.

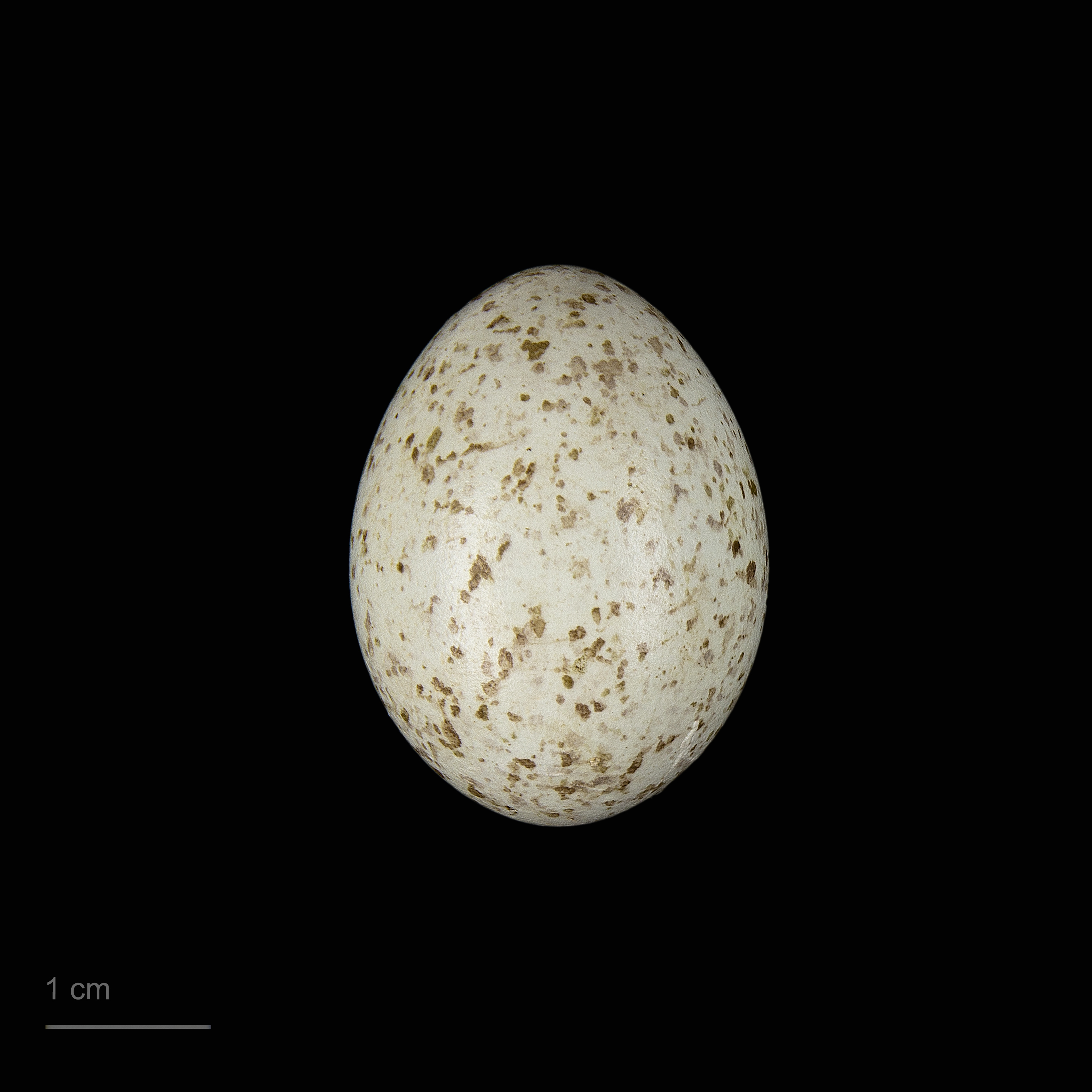
Egg of northern nutcracker

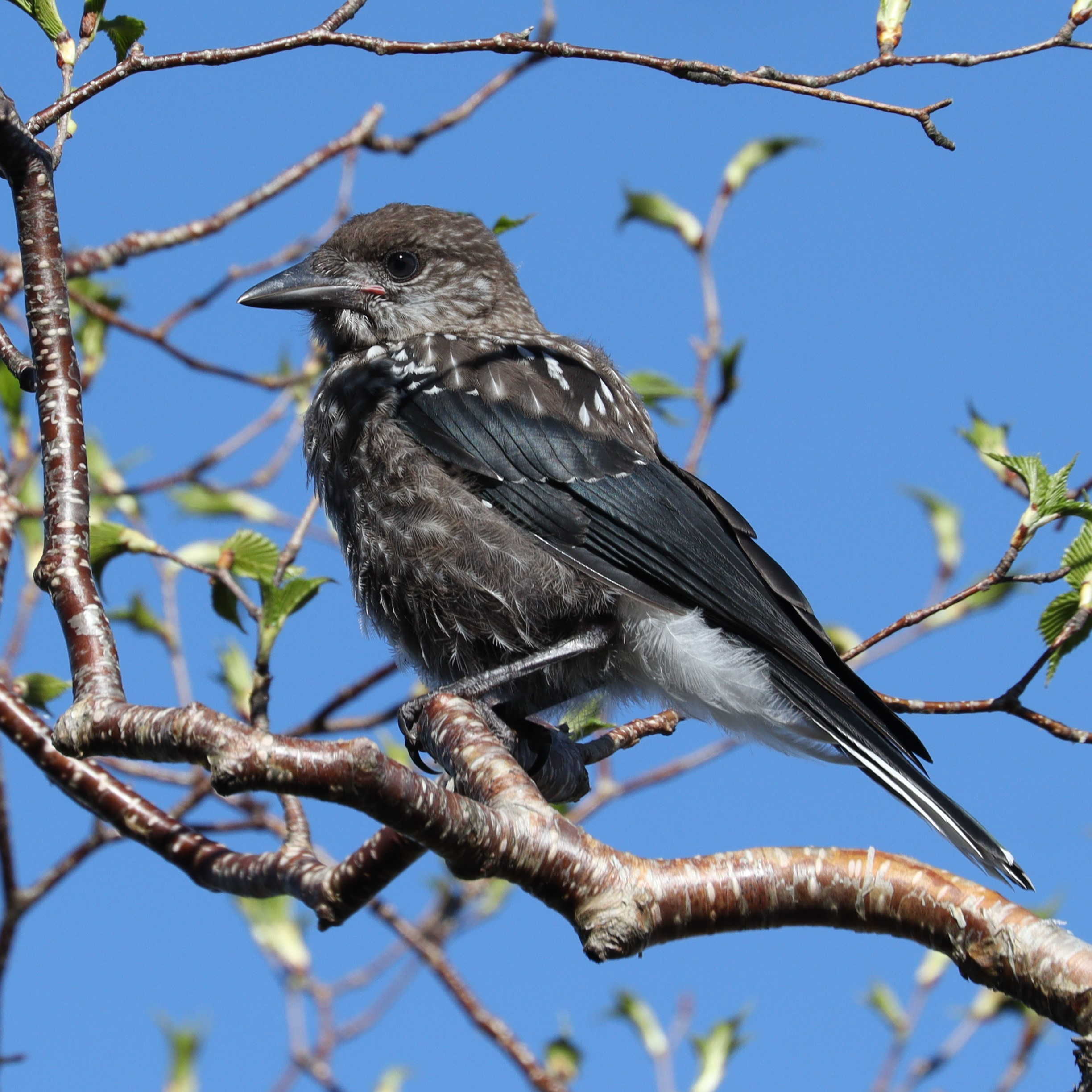
Juvenile N. c. japonica in Ōshika, Nagano Prefecture, Japan

== Distribution ==
The northern nutcracker has an extensive range forming a broad swathe east–west from Scandinavia right across northern Europe, Siberia and to eastern Asia, including Japan, inhabiting the huge taiga conifer forests in the north.

Disjunct populations occur in mountain conifer forests further south, in the mountains of central and southeast Europe in the Alps, the Carpathians and the Balkan Peninsula mountains. See subspecies list above for race distributions. Some of the populations can be separated on bill size.

This species has a large range, extending over 10,000,000 km^{2} (3,900,000 sq mi) globally. It also has a large global population, with an estimate of between 800,000 and 1,700,000 individuals in Europe.

Northern nutcrackers are not migratory, but will erupt out of range when a cone crop failure leaves them short of a food supply, the thin-billed eastern race N. c. macrorhynchos being the most likely subspecies to do this. Britain records very sporadic vagrants, but in 1968 over 300 nutcrackers visited Britain as part of a larger irruption into western Europe, probably due to a spell of early cold weather in Siberia.
