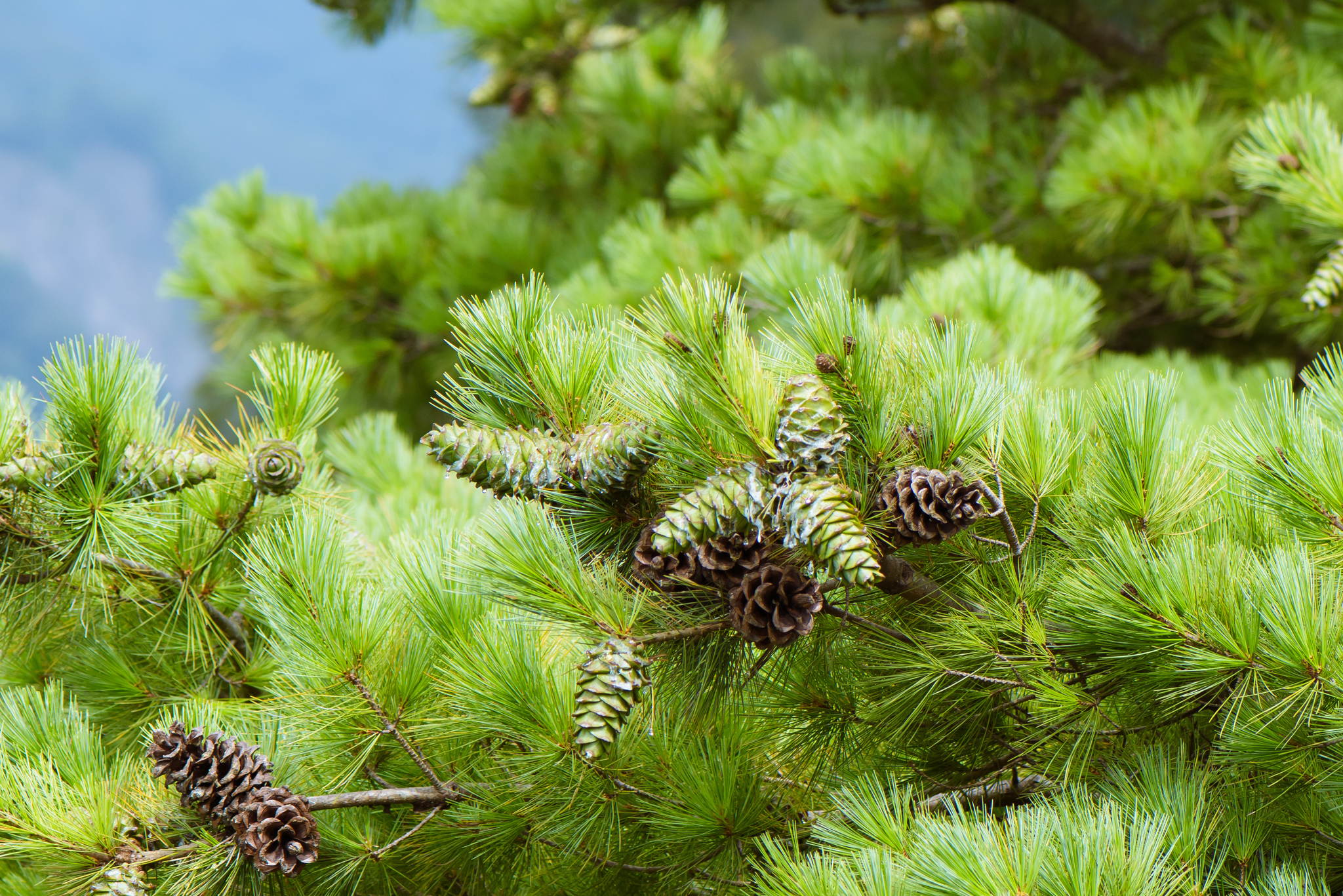
- An individual in the Aowanda Forest, Nantou County, Taiwan

Conservation status
- Endangered (IUCN 3.1)

Scientific classification
- Kingdom: Plantae
- Clade: Tracheophytes
- Clade: Gymnospermae
- Division: Pinophyta
- Class: Pinopsida
- Order: Pinales
- Family: Pinaceae
- Genus: Pinus
- Species: P. armandii
- Variety: P. a. var. mastersiana

Trinomial name
- Pinus armandii var. mastersiana Hayata, 1908

Synonyms
- • Pinus mastersiana Hayata,1908 • Pinus armandii subsp. mastersiana (Hayata) Businský, 1999

= Pinus armandii var. mastersiana =

Taiwan high mountain pine

Variety of conifer

Pinus armandii var. mastersiana (Chinese: 台湾果松 or 台灣華山松, Japanese: タカネゴヨウ), also known by the common names of the Taiwan high mountain pine, Taiwan mountain pine, or Masters' pine, is a rare variety of Pinus armandii in the family Pinaceae that is endemic to portions of northern and central Taiwan.

== Etymology ==
Pinus armandii var. mastersiana was named in honor of British botanist Maxwell T. Masters, who was a well-known conifer expert up until he went into teratology.

Two of its common names (Taiwan high mountain pine, and the Taiwan mountain pine), derive from its natural habitat; being mountainous woodlands and terrain.

== Description ==
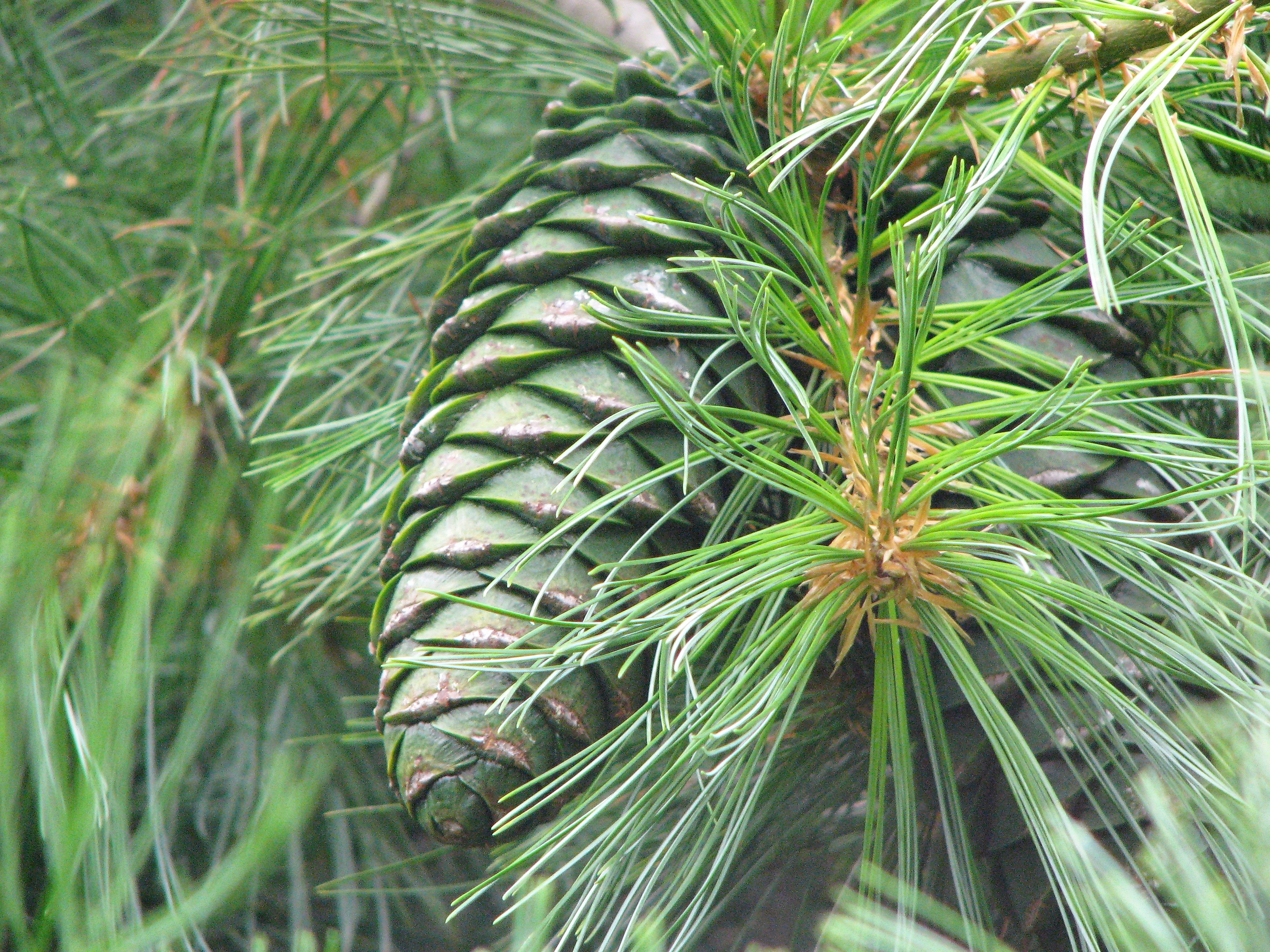
Immature cone details

Individuals on average reach a height of 20 m (66 ft) tall, and around 100 cm (3.3 ft) dbh. Branches and branchlets spread out in a wide, horizontal manner. Needles are in fascicles of 5, and are a bright green color. Cones are 10–20 cm (4–8 in) long, reddish brown to brown, and 8 cm (3.1 in) in diameter. Seeds are 8–12 mm (0.31–0.47 in) long, wingless, and of an ovoid shape.

== Distribution and habitat ==
Pinus armandii var. mastersiana is endemic to parts of northern and central Taiwan, where it grows at upward elevations of 2,300-3,000 m. Specifically, the variety is seen near the Alishan mountain range, and Mt. Yu Shan. Its habitat is made up of grassland, woodland, and rocky terrain dominated by Tsuga chinensis, Pinus taiwanensis, Acer morrisonense, Rhododendron rubropilosum, Viburnum parvifolium, and various Chamaecyparis spp.

== Conservation ==
Pinus armandii var. mastersiana is currently listed as "Endangered" by the IUCN Red List, for local logging, and wood harvesting have affected the variety's population greatly. It is in a steady, but rapid decline.

== Uses ==
It is used for high quality furniture making in a localized environment by locals. It is also used as an ornamental tree for botanical gardens and collectors.
