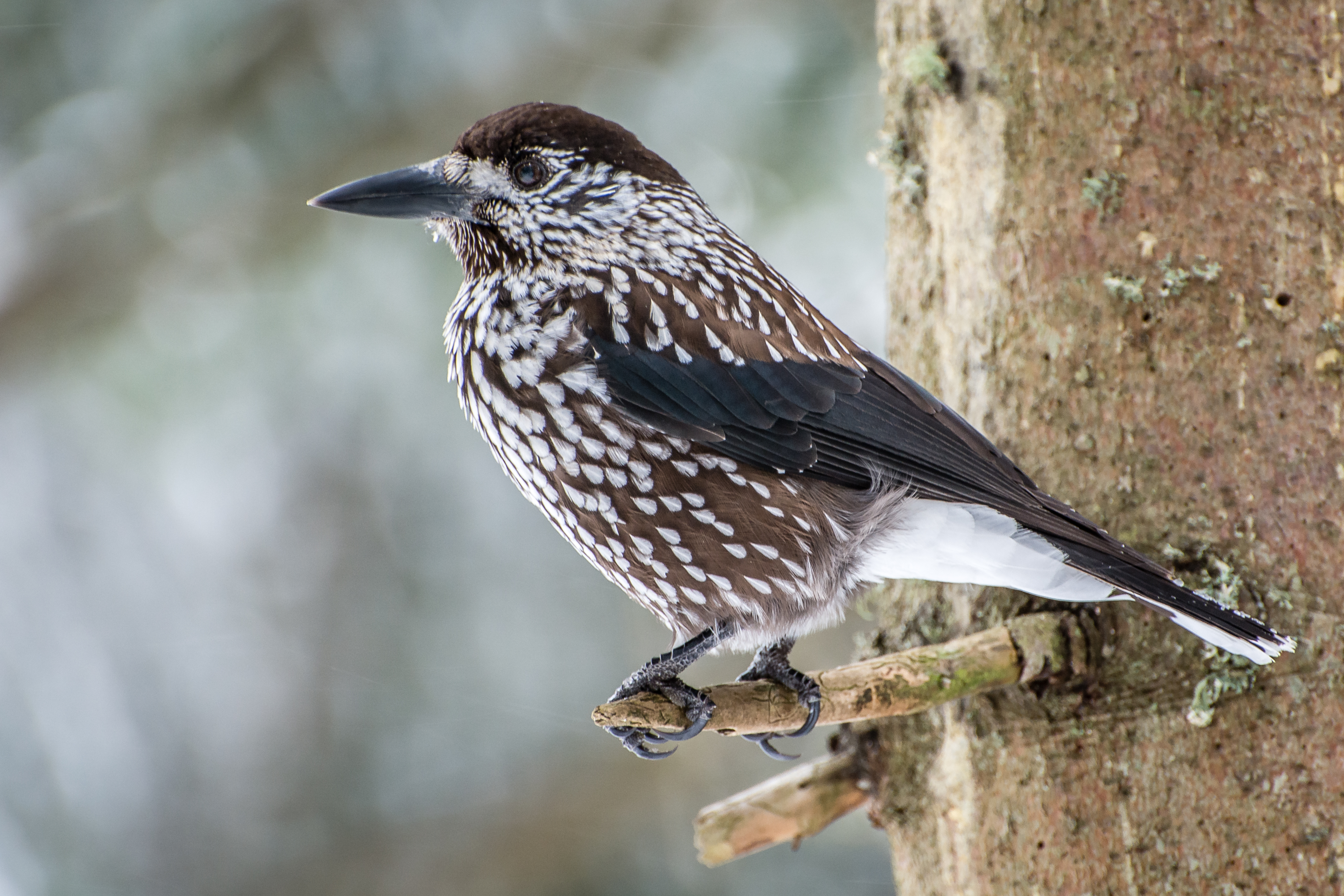
- Northern nutcracker (Nucifraga caryocatactes)

Scientific classification
- Kingdom: Animalia
- Phylum: Chordata
- Class: Aves
- Order: Passeriformes
- Family: Corvidae
- Subfamily: Corvinae
- Genus: Nucifraga; Brisson, 1760

Type species
- Corvus caryocatactes Linnaeus, 1758

Species
- Nucifraga columbiana Nucifraga caryocatactes Nucifraga hemispila Nucifraga multipunctata

= Nutcracker (bird) =

Nutcrackers

Genus of birds

The nutcrackers (Nucifraga) are a genus of four species of passerine bird, in the family Corvidae, related to the jays and crows.

The genus Nucifraga was introduced by the French zoologist Mathurin Jacques Brisson in 1760 with the northern nutcracker (Nucifraga caryocatactes) as the type species. The genus name is a Neo-Latin translation of an old German name Nussbrecher, "nut-breaker".

== Extant species ==
Following reappraisal of species limits in the genus in Asia, the genus is now treated as containing four species: This follows the split of Southern and Kashmir nutcrackers from a former broad view (e.g. Voous, 1977) of all Eurasian nutcrackers as being a single species.

Genus Nucifraga – Brisson, 1760 – four species
Common name	Scientific name and subspecies	Range	Size and ecology	IUCN status and estimated population
Clark's nutcracker	Nucifraga columbiana (Wilson, 1811)	Western North America	Size: Habitat: Diet:	LC
Northern nutcracker	Nucifraga caryocatactes (Linnaeus, 1758) Four subspecies: N. c. caryocatactes (Linnaeus, 1758); N. c. macrorhynchos C. L. Brehm, 1823; N. c. rothschildi E. J. O. Hartert, 1903; N. c. japonica E. J. O. Hartert, 1897	Central and northeastern Europe across northern Asia east to northeast Japan	Size: Habitat: Diet:	LC
Southern nutcracker	Nucifraga hemispila Vigors, 1831 Four subspecies: N. h. hemispila Vigors, 1831; N. h. macella Thayer & Bangs, 1909; N. h. interdicta Kleinschmidt & Weigold, 1922; N. h. owstoni Ingram, C, 1910	Himalayas to north China and Taiwan	Size: Habitat: Diet:	LC
Kashmir nutcracker	Nucifraga multipunctata Gould, 1849	Western Himalayas	Size: Habitat: Diet:	LC

The most vital food resources for these species are the seeds (pine nuts) of various pines (Pinus sp.), principally the cold-climate (far northern or high altitude) species of white pine (Pinus subgenus Strobus) with large seeds: P. albicaulis, P. armandii, P. cembra, P. flexilis, P. koraiensis, P. parviflora, P. peuce, P. pumila, P. sibirica and P. wallichiana, and also the pinyon and lacebark pines. In some regions, where none of these pines occur, the seeds of spruce (Picea sp.) and hazel (Corylus sp.) nuts form a vital part of the diet instead. Their bills are specialised tools for extracting seeds from pine cones.

Surplus seed is always stored for later use, and it is this genus that is responsible for the re-establishment of their favoured pines over large areas either burnt in forest fires or cleared by man. Each individual nutcracker can store as many as 98,000 pine nuts in a single season, and remembering the location of 75% to over 90% of their stash, even when buried in snow more than a metre deep. The memory is also retained for 7–8 months, enabling them to feed their young on seed stored the previous autumn. Nutcrackers will cache seeds as far as 32 kilometres (20 mi) away from parent plants, about eight times further than related dispersers like jays and crows, and are thus important in re-establishing forests and responding to climate change.

Various insects are also taken, including bee and wasp larvae, and birds' eggs and nestlings, and carrion if it is found.

Nesting is always early in this genus, so as to make the best use of pine nuts stored the previous autumn. The nest is usually built high in a conifer. There are normally 2–4 eggs laid and incubated for 18 days. Both parents feed the young, which are usually fledged by about 23 days and stay with their parents for many months, following them to learn food storage techniques.

None of the species are migratory, but they will leave their usual ranges if a cone crop failure causes a food shortage.
