= Pinus dabeshanensis =

Conservation status
- Vulnerable (IUCN 3.1)

Scientific classification
- Kingdom: Plantae
- Clade: Tracheophytes
- Clade: Gymnospermae
- Division: Pinophyta
- Class: Pinopsida
- Order: Pinales
- Family: Pinaceae
- Genus: Pinus
- Subgenus: P. subg. Strobus
- Section: P. sect. Quinquefoliae
- Subsection: P. subsect. Strobus
- Species: P. dabeshanensis

Binomial name
- Pinus dabeshanensis W.C.Cheng & Y.W.Law

Species of conifer

Pinus dabeshanensis, Dabieshan white pine, is a species of pine found only in China. Some sources consider it as a synonym of Chinese white pine (Pinus armandii), which it closely resembles.

The natural range of Pinus dabeshanensis is very restricted although it has been used locally in planting programs; the species occurs in the Dabie Mountains in Anhui and Hubei provinces at elevations between 900 and 1,400 m (3,000 and 4,600 ft).
