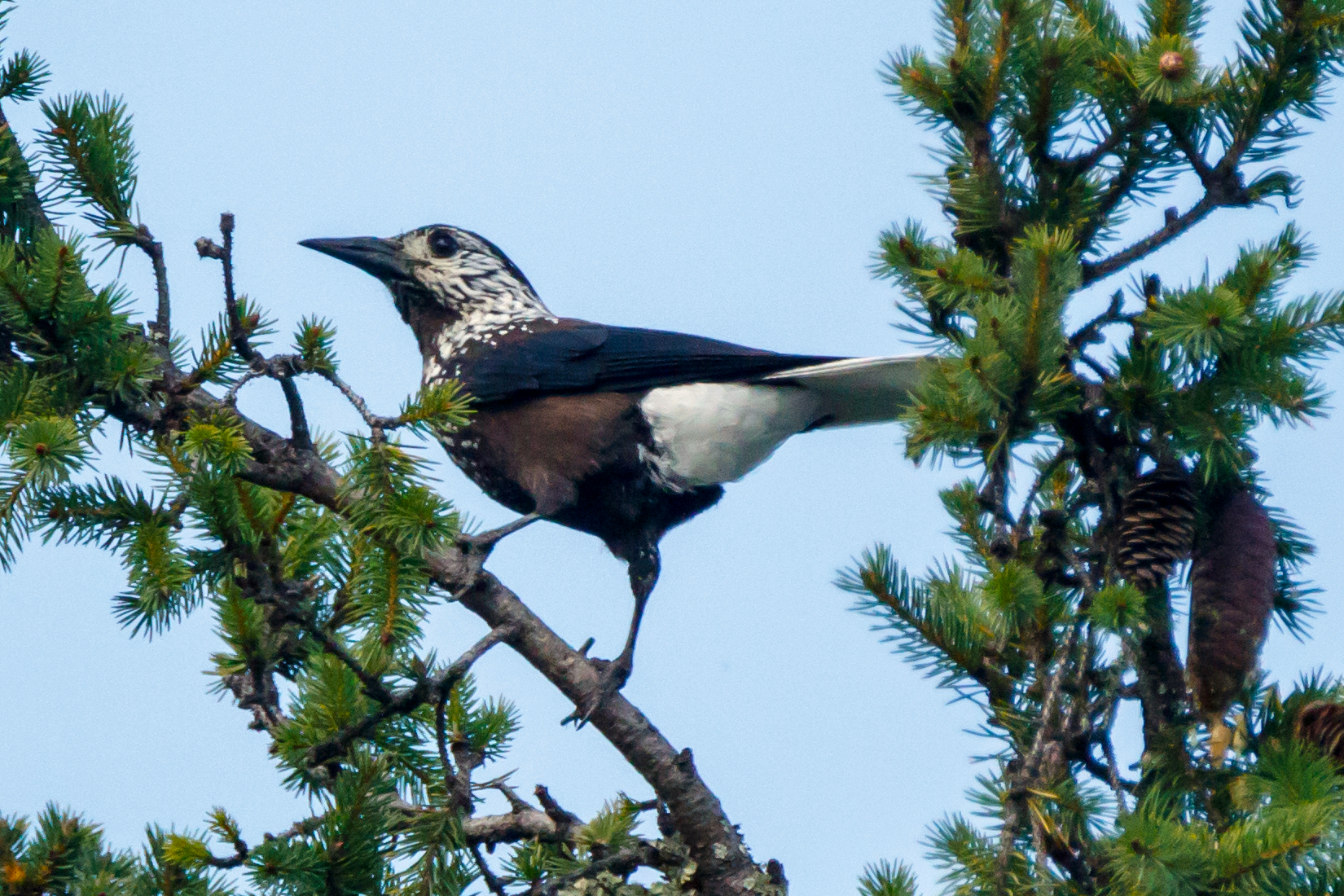
- Nucifraga hemispila hemispila in western Nepal

Conservation status
- Least Concern (IUCN 3.1)

Scientific classification
- Kingdom: Animalia
- Phylum: Chordata
- Class: Aves
- Order: Passeriformes
- Family: Corvidae
- Genus: Nucifraga
- Species: N. hemispila

Binomial name
- Nucifraga hemispila Vigors, 1831

Synonyms
- Nucifraga caryocatactes hemispila

= Southern nutcracker =

Species of bird

The southern nutcracker (Nucifraga hemispila) is a passerine bird in the crow family Corvidae. It was formerly considered to be conspecific with the northern nutcracker (Nucifraga caryocatactes) and the Kashmir nutcracker (Nucifraga multipunctata) under the English name "spotted nutcracker".

== Taxonomy ==
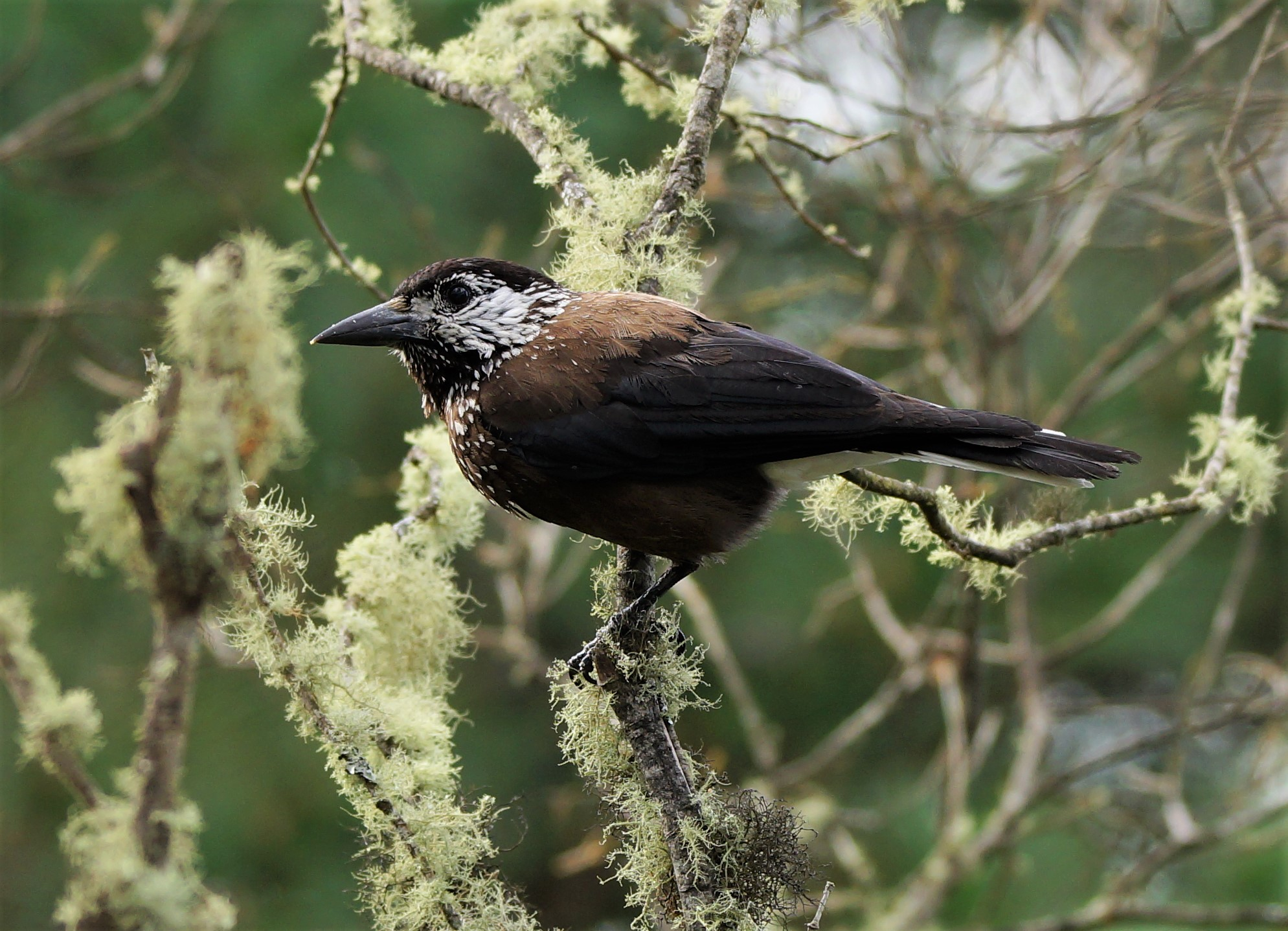
Nucifraga hemispila owstoni, Taiwan

The southern nutcracker was formally described in 1831 by the Irish zoologist Nicholas Vigors under the binomial name Nucifraga hemispila. He specified the type locality as just "the Himalayas"; however, research into Vigors' travels has been able to restrict the locality to the Shimla and Almora districts of northern India. The genus name Nucifraga is the Latin name given to the northern nutcracker by the English naturalist William Turner in 1544, as a translation of the German name Nussbrecher meaning "nut-breaker". The specific epithet hemispila combines the Ancient Greek ἡμι-/hēmi- meaning "half-" or "small" with σπιλος/spilos meaning "stain" or "spot". The southern nutcracker was formerly considered to be conspecific with the spotted nutcracker (Nucifraga caryocatactes), that now renamed in its revised narrower ciscumscription as northern nutcracker. It is here treated as a separate species based on differences in morphology and vocalisation, as well molecular genetic analysis.

Four subspecies are accepted:

- N. h. hemispila Vigors, 1831 – northwest, central Himalayas
- N. h. macella Thayer & Bangs, 1909 – east Himalayas to central and southern China and northern Myanmar
- N. h. interdicta Kleinschmidt & Weigold, 1922 – northern China
- N. h. owstoni Ingram, C, 1910 – Taiwan

== Description ==
The southern nutcracker is similar in size to the northern nutcracker, about 33 cm long. It is largely brown, with limited white spotting on the face and upper breast, plain brown lower breast and back, unmarked black wings, and white lower belly and under-tail coverts; for comparison, both the northern nutcracker and the kashmir nutcracker have extensive and larger white spots on the entire breast and back. The tail is black with white outer corners. The bill is stout and black, the legs also black.

== Ecology and behaviour ==
It occurs primarily in pine forests, with particular preference for Chinese white pine (Pinus armandii), blue pine (Pinus wallichiana), and other related white pines in Pinus subgenus Strobus, the seeds of which it caches and distributes in a manner similar to other nutcrackers; it will also use other conifers such as spruce in the event of cone crop failure in its preferred species.
