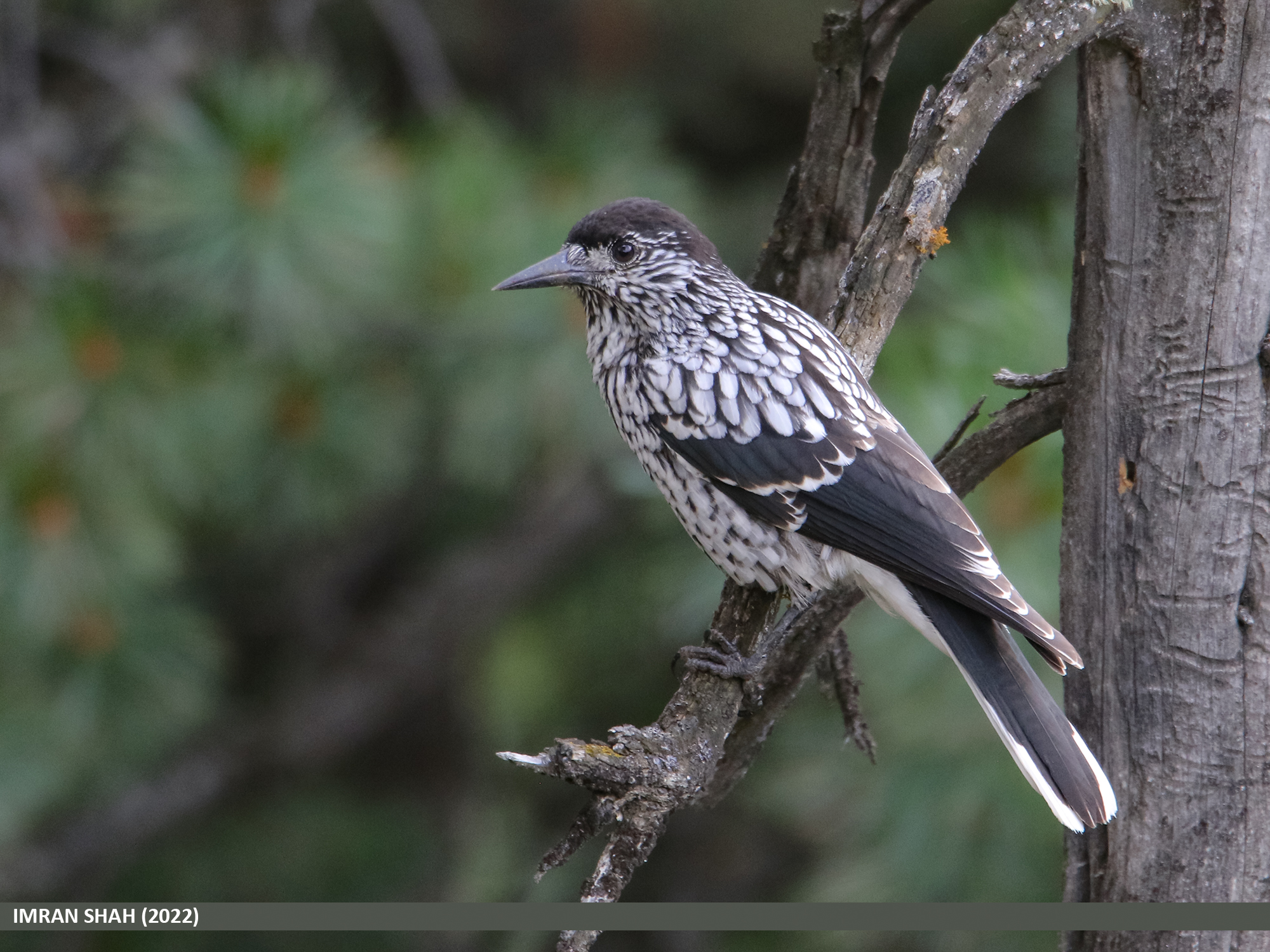

Conservation status
- Least Concern (IUCN 3.1)

Scientific classification
- Kingdom: Animalia
- Phylum: Chordata
- Class: Aves
- Order: Passeriformes
- Family: Corvidae
- Genus: Nucifraga
- Species: N. multipunctata

Binomial name
- Nucifraga multipunctata Gould, 1849

= Kashmir nutcracker =

Species of bird

The Kashmir nutcracker or large-spotted nutcracker (Nucifraga multipunctata) is a passerine bird related to the northern nutcracker and southern nutcracker. Until recently, it was considered a subspecies of the former. It is found in the western Himalayas.

== Taxonomy and systematics ==
The Kashmir nutcracker is closely related to the northern nutcracker (N. caryocatactes) and has only been split from it recently. Some authorities still treat these forms as conspecific. The two species are similar in appearance, though the Kashmir nutcracker in distinguished by a more whitish general appearance from its larger white spots, along with a contrasting blackish crown, wing, and base of tail. It also has bold white spots on the base of its tail, with a relatively slimmer tail, and longer tail.

It is monotypic.

== Description ==
It is a distinctive corvid with heavily streaked and spotted plumage. They are usually 32–35 cm (13–14 in) in length. They have a wing length of 195–212 mm (7.7–8.3 in), with a weight of 155–173 g (5.5–6.1 oz) for females and 165–177 g (5.8–6.2 oz) for males.

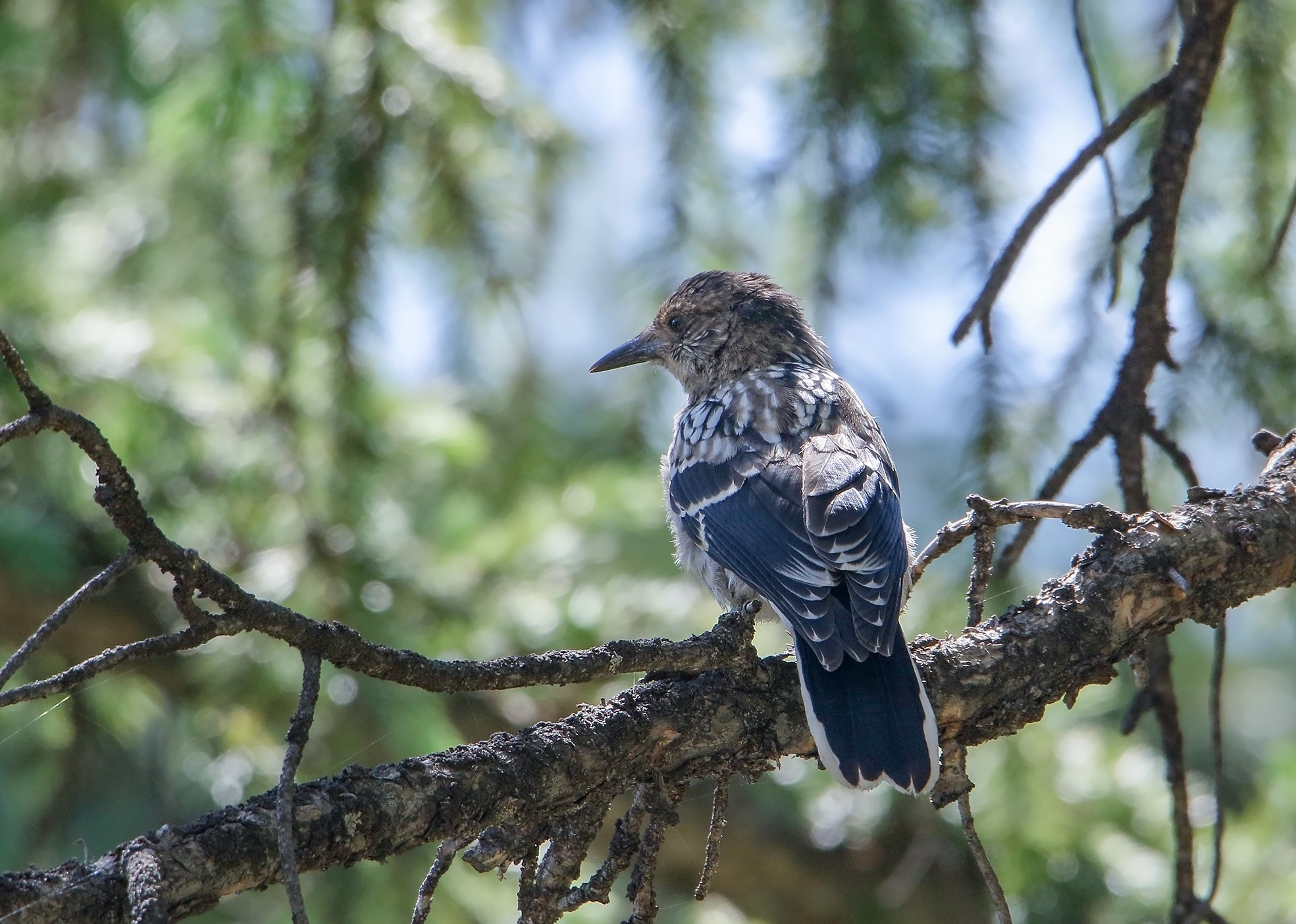
A Kashmir nutcracker in Gilgit-Baltistan, Pakistan.

It has a blackish crown and nape, with the sides of the head and the body plumage being blackish grey-brown. The body has heavy white streaking, spotting, and striping. Although the bird looks whitish from a distance, the breast and flanks show more brown than the rest of the body, also having more bold spotting. The wings are glossy black, with white tips on the coverts and secondaries. The tail is also glossy black and has white tips on all the rectrices. The vents and undertail coverts are completely white. The bill is relatively slim, conical, pointed, and black.

=== Vocalisations ===
Their vocalisations are poorly studied, but are described as being extremely similar to those of the Eurasian nutcracker. Begging juveniles make calls that have been described as "somewhat reminiscent of the squealing of little pigs". Other calls have been described as very variable, although it is not known if they are simply variations of a single call type, or are in fact individual calls.

The most common call is a loud and harsh nasal 'kraa', which is usually given doubled or tripled, and repeated in rapidly 6–7 times. It is quite distinctive and may have slower or faster variants. One possible variant is the 'reek', which is a less nasal and harsher call that is given in a different context. They also make a 'reer', which is a slightly overslurred call, more nasal than the other two, but with an uncertain function. They have a whisper song, though it is not a true song, like most corvid songs. It is described as a mixture of harsh notes which are higher in pitch than most of the typical calls produced by this species, and mixed with click-gulping nasal notes. The songs exhibit significant variation.

The birds are typically heard early in the day. The 'kraa' calls are given from conifer trees, at varying heights, while 'reek' calls have been recorded from birds perched some metres off the ground, and 'reer' call are typically observed from birds that are near or on the ground.

== Distribution and habitat ==
It is found in eastern Afghanistan, north and western Pakistan, Kashmir, and extreme northwestern India, with its range possibly extending to extreme southwestern parts of the Tibet Autonomous region in China.

It inhabits coniferous forests and mixed conifer and oak forests, especially in forests composed of blue pine (Pinus wallichiana), chilgoza pine (Pinus gerardiana), and Morinda spruce. It is found from altitudes of 1,000 to 4,000 m (3,300 to 13,100 ft), although it mainly stays with 2,000–3,000 m (6,600–9,800 ft) on alpine slopes. It may descend to lower altitudes in late summer to collect nuts for winter stores. It is also frequently attracted to human habitation.

== Behaviour and ecology ==
=== Diet ===
Its diet is similar to that of the Eurasian nutcracker. It feeds on conifer seeds, mainly from blue pine, chilgoza pine, and to a lesser extent morinda spruce and acorns from various oaks (Quercus spp.). It has also been reported taking walnuts (Juglans regia) and hazelnuts (Corylus spp.) for winter stores.

=== Reproduction ===
Breeding season is thought to be in May–July, but egg-laying is probably earlier, in February–March. Nest with live young have been observed as early as the second week of March in Himachal Pradesh. The breeding season in Afghanistan ends around late April to early May, indicating that the mays hatch around January to late February.

It is a solitary nester, and has a single brood, though it may lay replacement eggs if the first egg is lost.

Nests are typically placed close against the trunks of trees, at a height of 10–30 m (33–98 ft) in dense conifers. The nests are well-built and have a deep cup. The nests are made out of twigs, decorated with lichens, and are lined with soft roots and pine needles.

Eggs are laid in clutches of 3–4 eggs. They are 32.8 mm × 25.4 mm (1.29 in × 1.00 in) in size on average, and pale blue with dense brown markings. The parents are thought to share incubation.

== Status ==
The bird is not considered threatened. It is observed near human settlements in its range, suggesting that it may be able to adapt to humans, although more research is needed to assess how much habitat disturbance it can tolerate.
